= Tatbir =

Self-flagellation ritual practiced by some Shia Muslims

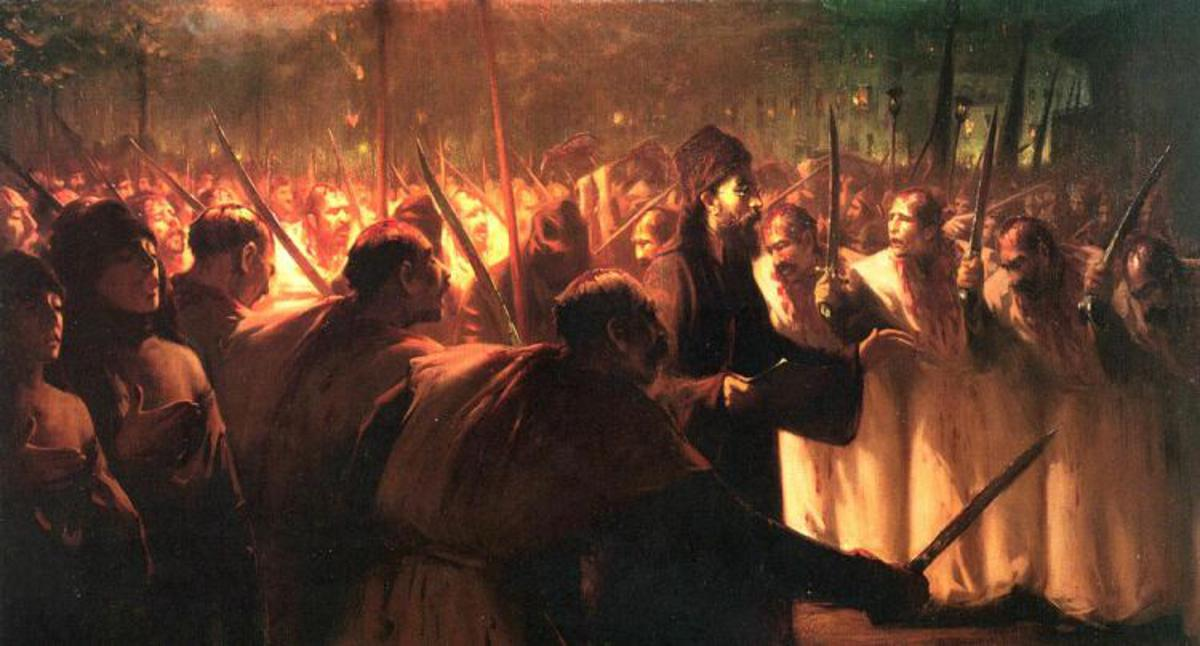
10th of Muharram, 19th-century painting by Fausto Zonaro

Tatbir (Arabic: تطبير, romanized: Taṭbīr) is a form of self-flagellation rituals practiced by some Shia Muslims in commemoration of the killing of Imam Husayn ibn Ali and his partisans in the Battle of Karbala by forces of the second Umayyad caliph Yazid I (r. 680–683).

The ritual is practiced in the Islamic month of Muharram, usually on Ashura. Tatbir involves striking oneself with chains or swords. It has been considered haram ("forbidden") by some of the Shia clergy, who cite it as self-harm.

== Origins ==
It can be firmly traced to the 19th century in Iran, where it was first introduced by Qizilbash tribes as a cultural practice – since engaging in self-flagellation was seen in Central Asia at the time as a way of mourning, which they likely inherited from the Scythians. Scythic peoples were previously recorded as having engaged in self-flagellation on the deathdate of Buddha, the Zoroastrian hero Siyavash, and the Scythian hero Targitaos. Another plausible theory pertains a Christian origin, due to the similarities in Christian Catholics who practice self-flagellation as a reenactment of the death of Christ.

The uncommonly character of this ritual was apparent in 19th-century Tehran, where Iranian cleric Fazel Darbandi became known for his "peculiarities", leading to his banishment from various shi'i cities:

He would weep violently, lacerate his face [i.e with knives], throw off his turban, and sometimes even throw himself from the minbar to the ground.

— M. A. Modarres, Rayḥānat al-adab

== Practice ==
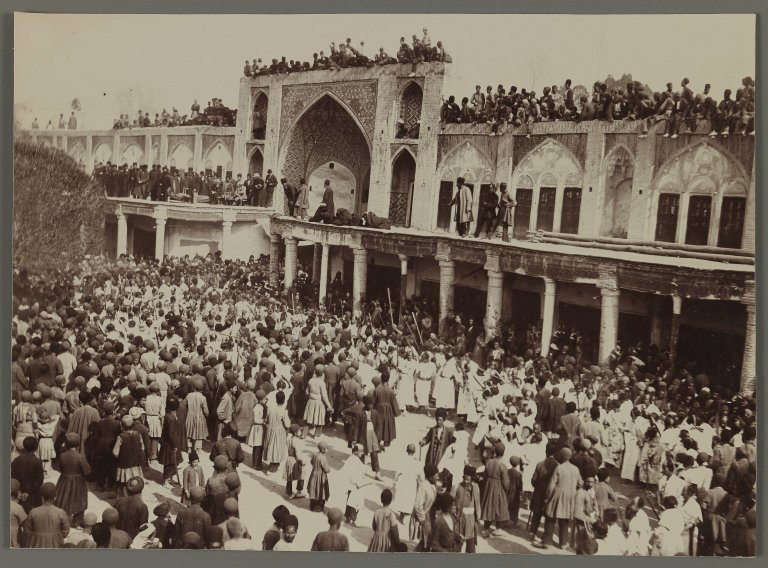
Performance of Tatbir in Iran. An image from Brooklyn Museum. The image is taken between 1876 and 1933.

Tatbir, also called Zanjeer Zani or Qama Zani, is practiced by some Shia Muslims on the day of Ashura on the 10 Muharram of the Islamic calendar and on the 40th day after Ashura, known as Arba'een (or Chehelom in Persian) by Twelver Shias around the world. Some Shia may also perform tatbir on other occasions as well.

The practice of Tatbir includes striking oneself with a talwar, a type of sword, on the head, causing blood to flow in remembrance of the pain felt by Husayn ibn Ali. Some also hit their back and/or chest with blades attached to chains.

== Fatwas ==
Tatbir are contested among Shia clerics. While some clerics allow believers to indulge in tatbir, a large portion of clerics generally deem it impermissible, because it is considered an innovation, as well as self-harm, thus being haram in Islam. The religious authorities who permit it associate all forms of self-flagellation and blood-letting as ways to relate to painful deaths during the battle of Karbala by Imam Husayn and supporters.

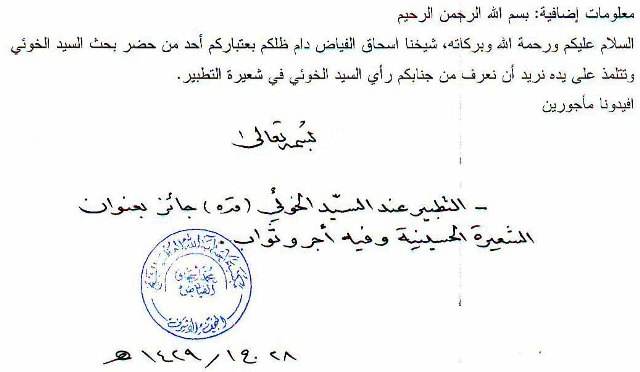
Fatwa of Abu al-Qasim al-Khoei on tatbir by Grand Ayatollah Ishaq al-Fayadh

#	Image	Marja'	Fatwa	Description
1		Ruhollah Khomeini	Permissible, but discouraged, later changed to Forbidden	"No problem in performing this act (tatbir)." "There is no obstacle if it doesn't cause harm, but it shouldn't be practised today." "If such actions bring about disrepute to the religion, then they are forbidden."
2		Abu al-Qasim al-Khoei	Permissible, later changed to impermissible, then Forbidden	"There is no problem in performing such act in itself according to the assumption in the question". "If blood matam and hitting oneself with chains, which are practiced in Muharram, cause serious harm, or harm or ridicule the religion and sect then it is impermissible." "This action has not been mentioned anywhere in the Holy Sharia. Not only that, but in any case, it causes damage, and becomes a source of mockery for the others, it is Forbidden."
3		Husayn Borujerdi	Forbidden	"My fatwa regarding these plays and performances that you conduct, in the manner I have heard, is that they are absolutely forbidden."
4		Mohammad Ali Araki	Permissible, if it does not cause harm	"If it doesn't cause any harm to the body or that there is no danger of dying from this act, then it is permissible (allowed)".
5		Ali Sistani	Not allowed	"One is not allowed to Harm the body, or the noble reputation of the Faith." "Those actions which are not understandable for the enemies of Islam and non-Shia Muslims, and cause misunderstanding and contempt for the religion must be avoided."
6		Ali Khamenei	Forbidden	Ali Khamenei, Supreme Leader of Iran has stated that Tatbir is forbidden. "Tatbir is a wrongful act ... Tatbir [Qame Zani] is also a fabricated tradition ... Do not practice it, I do not approve. If someone does anything to display their desire to practice Tatbir, I will be deeply disappointed in them."
7		Naser Makarem Shirazi	Forbidden	Muslims should avoid actions that display weakness in the Shia religion and damage the body.
8		Mohammad Fazel Lankarani	Forbidden	Tatbir shows the harsh face of mourning of Husayn ibn Ali and it harms Shiism.
9		Abdollah Javadi-Amoli	Forbidden	It is not permissible to insult Islam and the desecration of mourning. Therefore, it is better to avoid Tatbir and things like that.
10		Mohammad-Taqi Bahjat Foumani	Forbidden	It should be avoided; every act that would be an insult to the Shia.
11		Hossein Noori Hamedani	Forbidden	Should be avoided as actions that weakens the Shia religious.
12		Hossein Mazaheri Isfahani	Forbidden	When Wali e Faqih (Guardian Jurist) orders to avoid something, all people have to avoid it, even if they do not follow Guardian Jurist.
13		Kazem al-Haeri	Impermissible	Tatbir is a superstition that causes the defamation of Islam and Shia Islam in particular.
14		Mohaqiq Kabuli	Forbidden	There is no allowance to practice Tatbir or self-flagellation or something else that is considered as self-harm.
15		Mohammad Hussein Fadlallah	Forbidden	"I am among those who hold that Tatbir is forbidden."
16		Mohammad Yaqoobi	Not permissible	"It is not permissible in the Sharia to do any act that is irrational or harmful to oneself or requires an insult to the religion and the school of the Ahl al-Bayt." "As for striking the backs with sharp instruments, walking on embers, and the like, we have directed our followers and those who take our opinion to leave it."
17		Kamal al-Haydari	Forbidden	"None of the Imams have ever hit themselves with swords, nor have they ever advised anyone to do so, Tatbir is an innovation and thus Forbidden."
18		Morteza Motahhari	Impermissible	"[Tatbir] does not have a rational or religious basis. It is a clear instance of deviation [...] this is a mistake.”
19		Mohsen al-Amin	Forbidden	"[Tatbir] is from the encouragement of Shaytan.” "It is from the saddening things [...] using drums and flutes, and cutting the heads in a way that show the Shia in a barbaric way and make the others mock them."
20		Abu l-Hasan al-Isfahani	Forbidden	"The usage of swords, chains, drums, horns and the likes today, which have become common in mourning ceremonies on Ashura, is definitely Forbidden and against religious doctrine."
21		Muhammad al-Fayadh	Permissible, if it does not cause serious harm to the body	Tatbir is permissible, if it does not cause serious damage to the body.
22		Muhammad Saeed al-Hakim	Recommended, if it does not cause harm to the body.	Tatbir as one form of the mourning of Husayn ibn Ali is permissible. It is permitted under the intention of sympathy with God and trust-seeking, to promote searching for trust. "Religious rituals that Shias perform to mourn the tragedies of the Imams of the Ahlulbait (peace be upon them) and to present the oppressions that they suffered are recommended. However, it is obligatory to avoid what causes harm to the soul or the body. If it does not result in harm, it remains being recommended. One should avoid performing them in a place where the reputation of the Shias is damaged." Imams did not "shed their own blood because of their sadness and grief for what happened to Imam Hussein".
23		Hossein Vahid Khorasani	Not Forbidden	"The Ayatullah also goes over the Fatwas (verdicts) of previous scholars on the Mourning rituals and he even states that shedding blood for the sake of mourning Ahlulbayt is Halal (lawful)."
24		Bashir al-Najafi	Not Forbidden	"Tatbir is permitted until it describes sorrow for Imam Hussain".
25		Shamsodin Vaezi	Permissible	"Tatbir is permissible (allowed) and the issue is described in detail in our book Al-Husseini rituals".
26		Jawad Tabrizi	Permissible, but discouraged	"Tatbir is permissible (allowed) and it is a Mustahab act, this is due to some narrations which state that: When sayyida Zainab saw Imam Hussain's head, she smashed her head into a rock and blood flowed from her head" "The inclusion of the aforementioned (acts like tatbir) under the category of recommended grief for what occurred to the Master of Martyrs is problematic/doubtful."
27		Mohammad Jamil Hammoud al-Amili	Permissible, even if causing death	"It is permissible, and even Mustahabb, since it falls under glorification (sha‘ā’ir), so long as the person performing it does not intend to destroy his own life." "If one strikes his head or body with a blade or chain, without intending to kill himself, and dies for the Master of Martyrs and his noble family, then without doubt he is rewarded and blessed, and has entered eternal bliss."

== Criticisms ==
- There are different opinions about the practice of Tatbir. Some Shia Marja believe that it is a form of self-harm, so it must be forbidden. According to some Shia Marja, it is felt that Tatbir reflects poorly on Shia observers, so they typically advise avoiding it in a region where Sunnis also reside.
- Iraqi sociologist Ibrahim al-Haidari has called Tatbir an irrational act. He states blood donations should replace Tatbir. Iraqi cleric Hussein Al-Sadr and his followers donate blood every year during the mourning of Husayn ibn Ali.
- Hassan Nasrallah, the former leader of Hezbollah in Lebanon, had also taken steps to end Tatbir. Instead of practicing Tatbir, he had offered to donate blood on Ashura day to patients who need it.
- Mohammad Mehdi Shamseddine established a blood bank in Najaf to donate blood on Ashura day to patients who need it.

== See also ==
- Battle of Karbala
- Criticism of Twelver Shia Islam
- Mourning of Muharram
- Self-flagellation
- Shi'ite iconography
