= Shi'ite iconography =

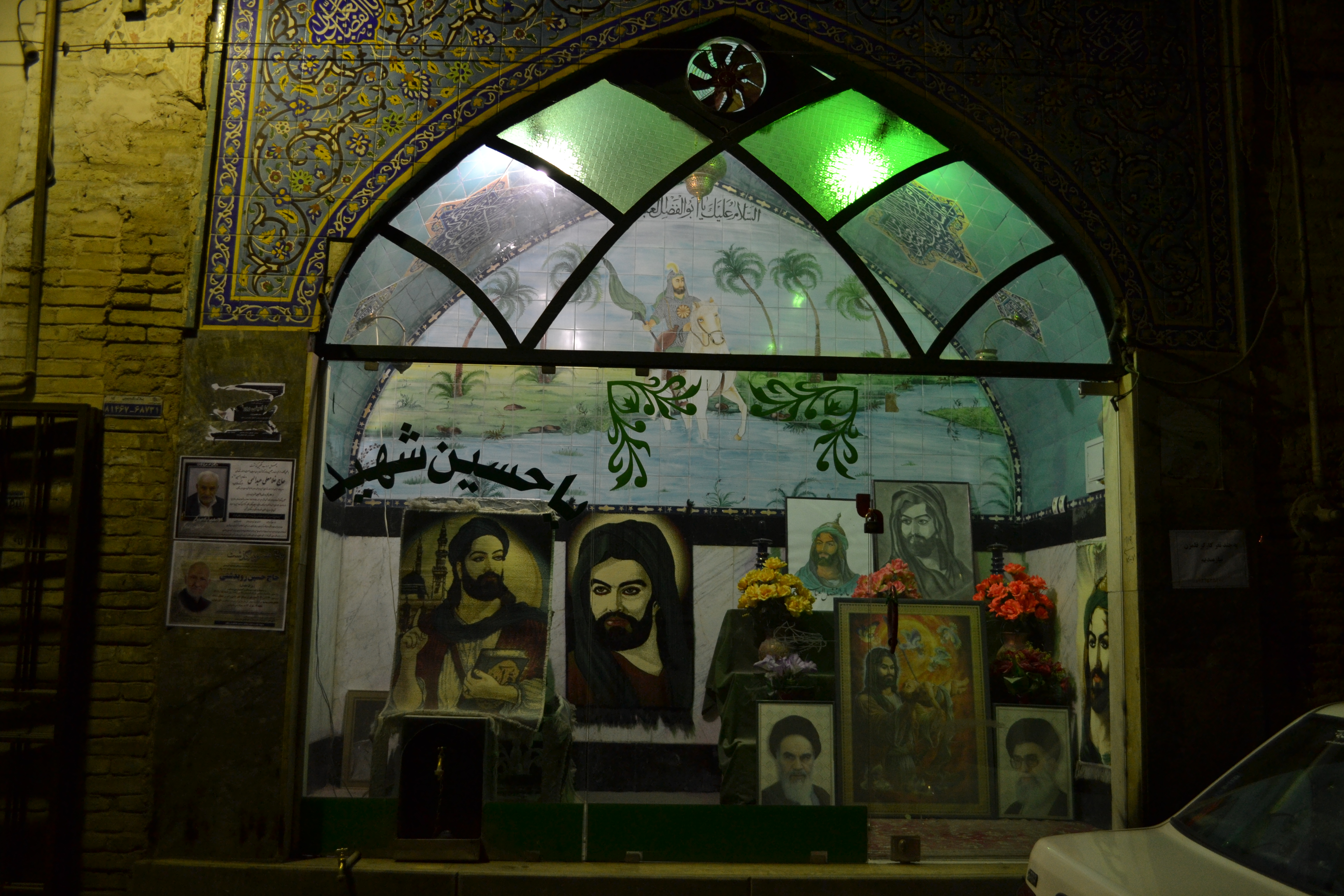
Depictions of Shi'a Imams sold at a Bazar in Isfahan, Iran

Shi'ite iconography (Arabic: صورة) encompasses any and all forms of artistic depictions by some Shia Muslims, especially but not limited to those incorporating or featuring the Twelve Imams, the Battle of Karbala, or the Event of Ghadir.

The practice is rooted in Islamic miniature, and later evolved into devotional images under the Pahlavi dynasty. Religious imagery has traditionally been considered forbidden by the majority of Shia Muslim scholars, and Aniconism in Islam has a firmly established history, though it continues to play an important role in Islamic culture to this day.

== Fatwas ==
#	Image	Marja'	Fatwa	Description
1		Ali Sistani	Permitted, with restrictions	"Depicting living creatures, such as human beings and the like, in three dimensions is Forbidden as a matter of ihtiyat. As for ordinary drawing/painting, evidently it is permissible." "Making a non-graven image is allowed. It is necessary to refrain from depicting the graven figure of a living being."
2		Ruhollah Khomeini	Forbidden	"Drawing pictures of living beings from among human beings and animals is forbidden, when they are in complete form. According to the stronger opinion, it is allowed if they are not in complete form, though it is more cautious to avoid it. There is no difference in the various forms of pictures whether they are painted, drawn, or embroidered, etc."
3		Ali Khamenei	Permissible	"There is no harm at all in the sculpture, photography and drawings of living beings, whether or not they have a soul."
4		Abu al-Qasim al-Khoei	Forbidden	"Making an image of a living being, and even its painting, is unlawful."
5		Muhammad Saeed al-Hakim	Forbidden	"In general, painting of living things is prohibited."
6		Mohammad Yaqoobi	Forbidden	"It's forbidden to make representations of persons and animals."
7		Mohammad Jamil Hammoud al-Amili	Forbidden	"It is forbidden by Sharia to make a depiction of any living being, such as a man and animal." "Drawing of the Infallibles is forbidden according to Sharia."
8		Bashir al-Najafi	Forbidden	"If it is not an image of a living being, then there is no objection to that." "[Images of the Imams] should be prevented in the best possible manner, just as it is obligatory for people to refrain from drawing these images." "The images [...] must not be attributed to the Imams, for they are purely imaginary pictures. Likewise, it is not permissible to draw an image of a being with a soul."
9		Wahid Khorasani	Forbidden	"The Imams and their great progeny, such as our master Abu Fadl al-Abbas, are too exalted to have their images depicted in a film or any other medium, and such an act is not permissible."
10		Sadiq al-Shirazi	Discouraged	"Drawing a living being, if it is corporeal and complete, is not permissible. As for other forms, it is discouraged [...]" "It is discouraged to depict a living being with pen and brush, but taking photographs and making films with a camera or similar devices is permissible." "[Images of the Imams] should be replaced with their wise words and noble sayings so that we may draw lessons and wisdom from them."
11		Mohammad Hussein Fadlallah	Discouraged	"I'd rather take an obligatory precaution by doing without it, rather than prohibiting it."
12		Naser Makarem Shirazi	Permitted, if non-religious	"If they ascribe pictures to the Holy Prophet or the Imams, certainly then it is not permitted." "Sculpture has a problem, but painting is permitted."
13		Mohammad Fazel Lankarani	Permitted, with restrictions	"If the pictures are not graven and are not insulting, there is no problem."
14		Yousef Saanei	Permissible	"Sculpture for reasonable purposes, is not prohibited; Painting or drawing is permissible if it does not include vulgar and nasty figures and does not encourage depravity and immorality." "Miniature and other paintings which do not popularize depravity and moral corruption are legal and it is legal to trade them."

== See also ==
- Criticism of Twelver Shia Islam
- Aniconism in Islam
- List of living maraji
- List of deceased maraji
- Tatbir
