= Sheikh Ibrahim =

Sheikh Ibrahim or Shaikh Ibrahim may refer to:

- Sheikh Ibrahim Shāh, Safaviyya Tariqa Shaykh during the period of 1429-1447, the father of famous Safaviyya Shaykh Junāyd and the great grand-father of Shāh Ismāʿīl of the founder of Safavid dynasty
- Shaikh Ibrahim, Iraq, town in northern Iraq
- Sheikh Ibrahim Bin Abdullah Al-Ghaith, former General President for the Saudi Committee for the Propagation of Virtue and the Prevention of Vice
- Shaikh Ibrahim al-Haidari, Iraqi historian
- Sheikh Ibrahim al-Nama'a, Iraqi imam and Islamist
- Sheikh Ibrahim Mudayris, Palestinian imam
- Sheikh Ibrahim Khaleel, Nigerian Islamic scholar
- Shaikh Ibrahim Memon Madani, Saudi Arabian imam and Islamic scholar
- Sheikh Ibrahim Sheikh Yusuf Sheikh Madar (1925–2004), Somali religious and political leader
- Sheikh Ibrahim bin Adel Hamza Al-Madani, Grand Mosque in Makkah muezzin
- Johann Ludwig Burckhardt, the name that Burckhardt travelled under in the Middle East, also the name by which he was referred to in other travel books from that era
