= Criticism of Twelver Shia Islam =

Criticism of Twelver Shia Islam dates from the initial ideological rift among early Muslims that led to the two primary denominations of Islam, the Sunnis and the Shias. The question of succession to Muhammad, the nature of the Imamate, the status of the twelfth Shia Imam, and other areas in which Twelver Shia Islam differs from Sunni Islam have been subjects of criticism by Sunni scholars, even though there is broad agreement between the two traditions regarding the centrality of the Quran, Muhammad, and many doctrinal, theological, and ritual matters.

Sunni criticism has historically focused on several key areas: the Twelver doctrine of the occultation of the twelfth Imam, the theological status and infallibility of the Imams, the practice of Taqiyya (concealment of faith under duress), the permissibility of Nikah mut'ah (temporary marriage), mourning rituals associated with Ashura and the Battle of Karbala, and alleged disrespect toward companions of Muhammad revered by Sunnis. Some of these criticisms reflect genuine theological disagreements rooted in differing interpretations of Islamic sources, while others have been identified by scholars as misrepresentations of mainstream Twelver doctrine or as polemical arguments specific to Salafi and Wahhabi theological currents rather than representative of broader Sunni scholarly opinion.

Twelver Shia Islam has its own internal tradition of reform and self-criticism. Shia commentators such as Musa al-Musawi and Ali Shariati have, in their attempts to reform the faith, criticized practices and beliefs prevalent in the Twelver Shia community. Twelver Shia theology is also discussed in this article in its own terms, including foundational doctrines such as Nur-e-Muhammad, Ismah (infallibility of the Imams), Tawassul (intercession), and the principle of Amr Bayn al-Amrayn (a theological middle ground between absolute determinism and absolute free will), which are essential context for evaluating the criticisms raised.

== Image veneration ==
Sunnis are particularly critical of the "love of visual imagery evident in Shia popular devotionalism" and regularly cite this characteristic (often referred to as 'Shi'ite iconography') as proof of Shia deviance or heresy.

Twelver Shia theologians respond to this criticism through the doctrine of Tawassul (intercession), which holds that venerating images or visiting shrines of Muhammad, the Imams, and pious figures is not worship of those figures but rather a means of drawing closer to Allah through those whom He has honoured. In Twelver theology, the distinction between ibadah (worship, which belongs to Allah alone) and tawassul (seeking nearness to Allah through intermediaries) is fundamental, and Shia scholars argue that conflating the two reflects a misunderstanding of the theology underlying Shia devotional practice. The display of images of the Imams in Shia homes and public spaces is understood within this framework as an expression of love (mahabbah) for the Ahl al-Bayt, which the Quran itself identifies as the recompense asked by Muhammad for his mission. (Note: Quran 42:23) The criticism of visual imagery as inherently idolatrous reflects a specifically Salafi and Wahhabi theological position; traditional Sunni schools of law have historically held more varied positions on the permissibility of images, and the blanket equation of Shia iconography with idol worship is not representative of all Sunni scholarly opinion.

== Occultation ==
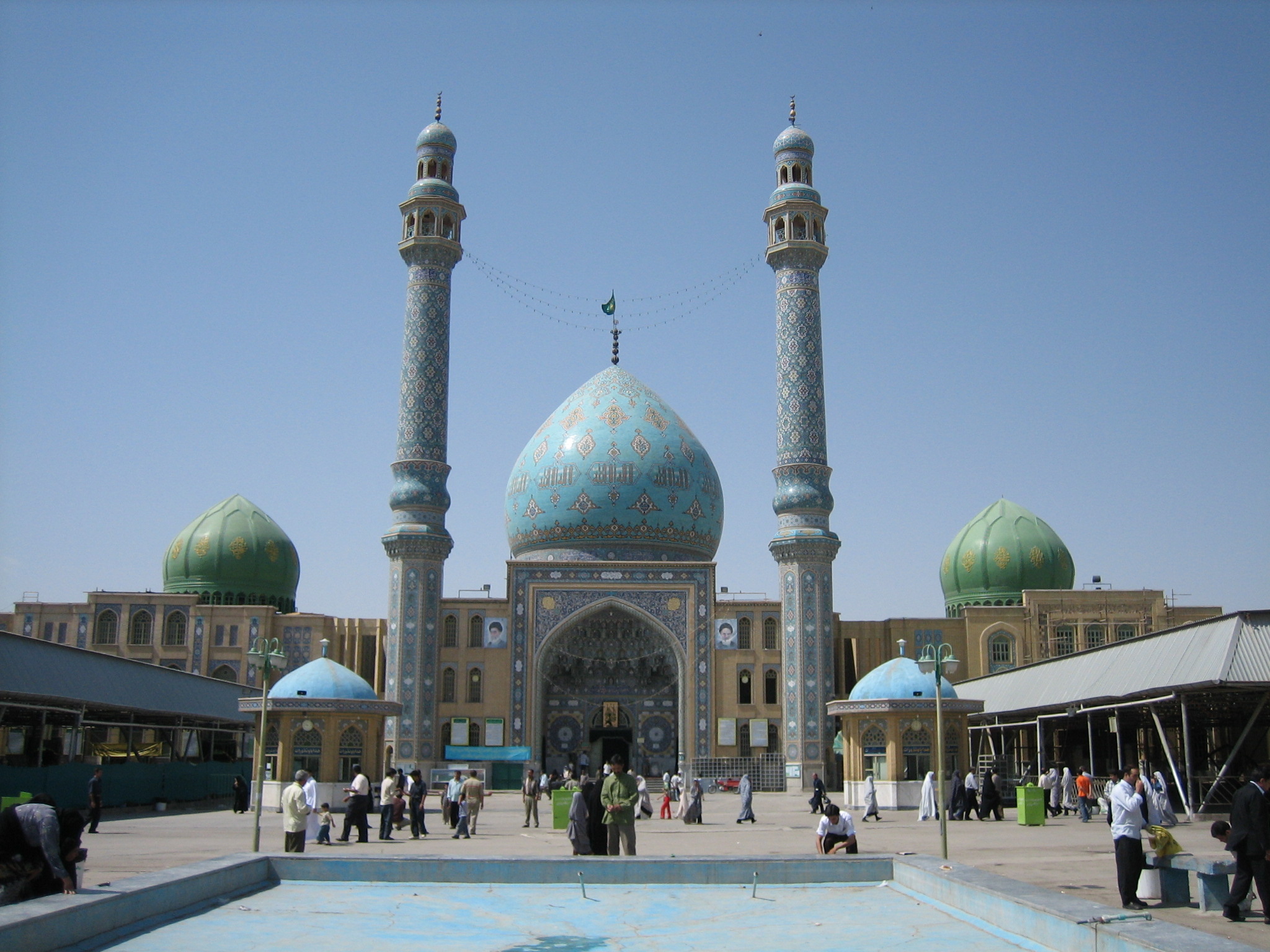
Jamkaran in Iran, supposed site of a historical appearance of Muhammad al-Mahdi

In the tradition of Twelver Shia Islam, the twelfth and final Imam, Muhammad al-Mahdi, who is also considered by Twelver Shia to be the prophesied redeemer of Islam known as the Mahdi, went into ghaybah ("occultation") in 873 CE. However, this belief has long been criticized by Sunni scholars who "often speculate that the twelfth Imam never existed, but was a myth designed to keep the Shia cause alive." According to Western scholar Robert Gleave, the doctrine of the 12th Imam's occultation emerged as the most theologically coherent explanation following the death of the 11th Imam, al-Hasan al-Askari, when alternative theories about the succession were not widely accepted. This belief subsequently became a foundational aspect of Twelver Shia orthodoxy. According to Bernard Lewis, the concept of the Imam's occultation and eventual return became a defining doctrine in Shia Islam after the suppression of various uprisings and the mysterious disappearances of their leaders. Over time, with each leader who vanished without returning, the belief in the Imam's concealment and promised return became increasingly detailed and integral to Shia thought.

In a hadith upon whose authenticity Shias and Sunnis agree, Muhammad had said, "If there were to remain in the life of the world but one day, God would prolong that day until He sends in it a man from my community and my household. His name will be the same as my name. He will fill the earth with equity and justice as it was filled with oppression and tyranny." (Note: For more hadiths see Sahih of Tirmidhi. Cairo, 1350-52. vol. IX, chapter "Ma ja a fi’l-huda": Sahih of Abu Da’ud, vol.ll, Kitab al-Mahdi: Sahih oflbn Majah, vol.ll. chapter khurui’ al-Mahdi": Yanabi’ al-mawaddah: Kitab al-bayan fi akhbar Sahib al zaman of Kanji Shaafi’i, Najaf, 1380; Nur al-absar: Mishkat almasabih of Muham. mad ibn ’Abdallan al-Khatib. Damascus, 1380; al- Sawa’iq al-muhriqah, Is’af al raghibin of Muhammad al-Sabban, Cairo. 1281: al-Fusul al-muhimmmah; Sahih of Muslim: Kitab al-ghaybah by Muhammad ibn Ibrahim al-Nu’mani, Tehran, 1318; Kamal al-din by Shaykh Saduq. Tehran, 1301; lthbat al-hudat; Bihar al-anwar, vol. LI and LII.) However, the majority of Sunnis do not consider the son of eleventh Imam as the promised Mahdi. Shias claim the only possible occasion that the son of eleventh Imam is said to have made a public appearance was at the time of his father's death to lead his funeral prayer, then as a child the boy was seen no more. His birth, Shia says, like the case of the prophet Moses, was concealed due to the difficulties of the time, and because of the belief that he was the promised Mahdi, the caliphs of the time had decided definitely to put an end to the Imamate in Shi'ism once and for all.

== Nikah mut'ah ==
Nikah mut'ah (lit. "pleasure marriage"), is a fixed-term marriage sometimes practiced in Twelver Shia Islam. The duration of this type of marriage is fixed at its inception and is then automatically dissolved upon completion of its term. For this reason, nikah mut'ah has been widely criticised as the religious cover and legalization of prostitution. Western writers like Zeyno Baran and Elena Andreeva have written that this kind of marriage is indistinguishable from prostitution. According to Shahla Haeri, before the 1979 revolution, the secular Iranian middle classes viewed temporary marriage as a form of prostitution legitimized by the religious establishment, describing it as having been given a 'religious cover.'

Mainstream Sunni jurisprudence holds that Muhammad definitively prohibited mut'ah during his lifetime, with the prohibition most commonly cited as occurring at the Battle of Khaybar or the Conquest of Mecca, and all four Sunni schools of law (Madhabs) consider it forbidden. Shias maintain that it was in fact banned by Umar ibn Khattab, the second caliph, acting without prophetic authority, and view mut'ah as a valid practice with Quranic sanction.4:24 Shia scholars consider it a safeguard against prostitution in situations where permanent marriage is not feasible, arguing that the legal structures surrounding mut'ah — including iddah, legitimacy of children, and inheritance rights — fundamentally distinguish it from prostitution.

Shia have systematically contested the criticism that it is a cover for prostitution, and argue their rationales regarding the legal uniqueness of temporary marriage, which distinguishes Mut'ah ideologically from prostitution. Children born of temporary marriages are considered legitimate, and have equal status in law with their siblings born of permanent marriages, and do inherit from both parents. The bride must not be married, she must attain the permission of her wali if she has never been married before, she must be Muslim or belong to Ahl al-Kitab (People of the Book), she should be chaste, must not be a known adulterer, and she can only independently do this if she is Islamically a non-virgin or she has no wali (Islamic legal guardian). At the end of the contract, the marriage ends and the wife must undergo iddah, a period of abstinence from marriage (and thus, sexual intercourse). The iddah is intended to give paternal certainty to any children should the wife become pregnant during the temporary marriage contract. Some Shia scholars also view Mut'ah as a means of eradicating prostitution from society.

== Taqiyya (dissimulation) ==
Taqiyya is a Shi'ite practice under which it is permissible to hide one's faith in order to preserve one's life or safety. The Shia have been criticised for this practice, an act deemed against the virtues of bravery and courage. Critics argue that the Twelvers have taken dissimulation far beyond life-threatening situations and have allowed its use in any scenario that is judged to benefit the continuation or propagation of the Twelver creed, as is emphasized by the reputed saying attributed to the 6th Imam Ja'far al-Sadiq, "[t]aqiyyah is my religion and the religion of my forefathers". Another saying frequently cited by critics, attributed to Imam al-Sadiq in Kitab al-Kafi, states that "nine tenths of faith is taqiyya." Shia hadith scholars have noted that this narration's chain of transmission (isnad) is weak and its interpretation contested even within Shia scholarly tradition; mainstream Twelver jurisprudence does not derive from it a license for unrestricted dissimulation, and leading marjas have consistently defined taqiyya's permissible scope narrowly as applying to situations of genuine danger to life, property, or communal safety. The practice is widely criticized by Sunni Muslims as indicative of the problems that they face when interacting with Shi'ites. According to Patricia Crone, Twelvers even extended the use of taqiyya "to protect their secret wisdom from exposure to the uncomprehending masses (including their own co-religionists), who might pervert it or denounce it as heretical." This view has been supported by Faysal Noor in his book Taqiyyah: The Other Face. Such a doctrine became important where Shi'a communities lived under oppression and were stigmatised under Sunni authority in areas where Sunnis were the majority. The practice of concealing one's beliefs in dangerous circumstances originates in the Qur'an, which deems blameless those who disguise their beliefs in such cases. (Note: Quran 16:106) The practice of taqiyya in difficult circumstances is considered legitimate by Muslims of various sects. Sunni and Shia commentators alike observe that verse 16:106 refers to the case of 'Ammar b. Yasir, who was forced to renounce his beliefs under physical duress and torture. This practice was emphasized in Shia Islam whereby adherents may conceal their religion when they are under threat, persecution, or compulsion. Taqiyya was developed to protect Shia who were usually in a minority and under pressure. In the Shia view, taqiyya is lawful in situations where there is overwhelming danger of loss of life or property and where no danger to religion would occur thereby. Shia commentators have argued that taqiyya has precedents from the time of Muhammad, including the story of Ammar ibn Yasir. Such commentators argue that to not avoid certain death is illogical, and that dissimulation is permissible under various circumstances, such as to preserve life, to protect the chastity of women, or avoid destitution.

== Disrespect to Abu Bakr and Umar ==
One allegation commonly leveled against the Twelvers is that they disrespect two of the Sunni Caliphs Umar and Abu Bakr, who supported Muḥammad, as per Sunni belief, during the early days of the Islamic Ummah, but whom Shi'ites believe later betrayed Muhammad after his death and his household (Ahl al-Bayt). Following the Safavid empire's conversion to Shia Islam, the first three caliphs, whom Shia tradition holds usurped Ali's rightful succession as first Caliph after Muhammad's death, were cursed during Friday sermons. The Dua Sanamain Quraish, a supplication which calls God's curse upon Abu Bakr and Umar, is sometimes cited in this context. However, this prayer is historically disputed and is not endorsed as a standard devotional practice by mainstream contemporary Shia marjas. Its attribution and authenticity have been questioned within Shia scholarly circles, and it does not occupy a place in mainstream Shia liturgy comparable to widely practiced supplications such as Ziyarat Ashura or Dua Kumayl. As Sunni scholar Shaykh Saleh Al-Fawzan summarises the views of the Rafidis as compared to the Nasibis:

The Raafidis are the opposite: they love the Prophet's family (ahl al-bayt) - or so they claim, but they hate the Saahaaba, whom they curse, denounce as kaafirs, and criticize.

During the 1960s, when an incipient ecumenical movement called for the unification of Shia and Sunni Islam, religious writers cited this "disrespect" for the Sahabah as a barrier to unification. In the 1980s and 1990s, three major religious writers in Egypt, Saudi Arabia, and Pakistan again cited this argument, noting that until all "profanity" against the Sahabah was abandoned, dialogue with Shia scholars could not begin. In 2010, Ali Khamenei issued a fatwa which bans any insult to the companions of Muhammad, as well as his wives, in an effort to reconcile legal, social, and political disagreements between Sunni and Shia. Similar fatwas were issued from Ali al-Sistani and other Shiite Marja'. However, some Shi'ite scholars in the past, such as Shaykh Tusi and Muhammad Baqir Majlisi, and some contemporary figures like Sadiq Hussaini Shirazi and Mohammad Jamil Hammoud al-Amili, have cursed and/or permitted disrespecting figures revered by Sunnis. Radical fringe figures such as Yasser Al-Habib, who was stripped of his religious credentials by mainstream Shia authorities and operates independently from London, have gone further in this direction, though their views are not representative of mainstream Twelver scholarship or the positions of recognised marjas.

== Imamate ==
Three of the Twelve Imams, held by the Twelver Shia to be God's representatives on Earth, were less than ten years old when they assumed the leadership of the Twelver Shi'ite community. The 9th Imam, Muhammad al-Jawad, was 7 1/2 years old at the time he assumed the Imamate; the 10th Imam, Ali al-Hadi, was between 6.5 and 8.5 years, and the 12th and final Imam, Muhammad al-Mahdi, was 4 1/2 years old. Pakistani Islamic scholar and polemicist Ihsan Ilahi Zahir argues against the possibility of these personalities assuming the leadership of the Imamate at such young ages. Wilferd Madelung notes, however, that in Shi'ite belief, the knowledge of an Imam comes from "inspiration, not acquisition", and thus that even a young Imam is not considered unprepared, receiving divine guidance upon the death of his predecessor.

As for the ninth Imam, the Shia could not help asking from his father, the eighth Imam whether a child at that age could take on such a responsibility if something happened to Imam Ali al-Ridha; and al-Ridha used to illustrate the story of Jesus who was even younger when he had become the prophet of his time. (Note: Quran 5:110) John the Baptist was also a child when he was given wisdom, and his reading and understanding of the scriptures surpassed even that of the greatest scholars of the time. (Note: Quran 19:12)

Shia'ites state that their account of Al-Ma'mun's first meeting with Muhammad al-Jawad demonstrates that divine wisdom is conferred upon the Twelve Imams. (Note: Once when al-Ma'mun was out hunting with his hunting birds he passed through a road where boys were playing. Among them was Muhammad al-Jawad. When al-Ma'mun's horsemen approached the boys ran away except al-Jawad who remained there. Noting this al-Ma'mun stopped his carriage and asked, "Boy, what kept you from running away with the others?" Al-Jawad replied, "The road was not so narrow that I should fear there would not be room for you to pass, and I have not been guilty of any offence that I should be afraid, and I considered that you were the sort of man who would not injure one who had done no wrong." The Caliph was very delighted, after he had gone on a short distance one of his hunting birds brought him a small fish, which he hid in his fist and returned and asked the boy, who was still standing there "What have I in my hand?" The young Imam answered that the "creator of living things has created in the sea a small fish that is fished by the falcons of the kings and caliphs to try with it the progeny of al-Mustafa." Al-Ma'mun was much pleased and asked the child about his lineage, to which Imam al-Jawad responded accordingly.) After which the Caliph called together a great gathering in which all kinds of questions were asked from the young Imam, who astonished them all with his judgment and learning, then al-Ma'mun declared formally that he gave him his daughter in marriage.

The Twelver Imamah doctrine is not shared by the majority of Sunni Muslims. The Syrian Salafi mufti Ibn Taymiyyah (d. 728 AH/1328 AD) composed a long refutation of it in his Minhaj as-Sunnah an-Nabawiyyah. Numerous Shia scholars have argued that the concept of Imamah is grounded in the Quran, citing verses such as 2:124, 5:55 and 33:33. Twelver Shi'ism has also been criticized for supposedly exaggerating the holiness and infallibility of its Imams. Central to understanding this aspect of Twelver theology is the doctrine of Nur-e-Muhammad (the Light of Muhammad), which holds that before the creation of the physical world, Allah created a primordial divine light (nur) from which Muhammad and the Imams of his household were formed. This doctrine, rooted in narrations found in al-Kafi and Bihar al-Anwar, establishes in Twelver theology that the Imams share in a pre-eternal spiritual reality that transcends ordinary human existence, while remaining categorically distinct from prophethood. It is within this doctrinal framework that statements such as that recorded by Al-Kulayni in al-Kafi — that the Imams possess knowledge of the past and future and do not die except by their own choice — are understood by Twelver theologians, not as exaggeration, but as a natural consequence of the Imams' unique ontological station.

The doctrine of Ismah (infallibility or protection from sin and error) is also central to the Twelver concept of Imamate. Twelver theologians argue that an Imam who is not protected from sin and error cannot reliably guide the community or authoritatively interpret divine law, rendering the institution of Imamate theologically meaningless without it. In Islamic Government, Khomeini writes: "Amongst the necessities in our doctrine is that our Imams have a dignity which no favored angel nor sent prophet could ever reach. As it has been narrated, the Imams were lights under the shadow of the throne before creating this world." Critics argue this reflects an excessiveness of view that elevates the Imams to a station approaching or surpassing that of Muhammad himself. Twelver scholars respond that the dignity attributed to the Imams derives entirely from Allah's designation (nass) and the Imams' own spiritual realities, and does not constitute a claim that the Imams supersede Muhammad in prophetic rank, since the Imams themselves are understood to be extensions and guardians of his message rather than independent sources of divine law. Both Shia and Sunni are in agreement over the two functions of prophethood: to reveal God's law to men, and to guide men toward God. However, while Sunnis believe that both functions came to an end with the death of Muhammad, Shi'ites believe that whereas legislation ended, the function of guiding and "explaining divine law continued through the line of Imams." In Shi'ite theology, God does not guide solely via authoritative texts (i.e. the Qur'an and Hadith) but also through specially designated individuals known as Imams, whose authority derives from divine appointment rather than communal election. This principle, Shi'ites say, is not limited to Islam; each great messenger of God had two covenants, one concerning the next prophet who would eventually come, and one regarding the immediate successor, the Imam. For example, Sam was an Imam after Noah, Ishmael was an Imam after Abraham, Aaron or Joshua after Moses, and Ali and his descendants after Muhammad. It is narrated from the sixth Imam, Ja'far al-Sadiq, "were there to remain on the earth but two men, one of them would be the proof of God".

According to Shia, the status and authority attributed to Imams would be meaningless if they were prone to the same weaknesses as ordinary people. God must designate someone possessing the attributes of Muhammad and Ismah as his successor to guide the people and interpret the Quran. Shi'ites state that the Ahl al-Bayt, described as purified of sin in the verse of purification, refers specifically to the Ahl al-Kisa, comprising only particular members of Muhammad's family. (Note: According to Madelung the majority of the Sunnite reports quoted by al-Tabari do not identify the ahl al-Kisa. Other Sunnite reports mention Fatimah, Hasan and Husayn, and some agree with the Shia tradition that the ahl al-kisa including Ali, were assembled for the event of mubahala.) Shias cite this as a Quranic argument for the infallibility of the Imams.

== Fatimah's divine inspiration ==
According to some Twelver Shia scholars, Muhammad's daughter Fatimah received divine inspiration after her father's death. In Islamic theological terminology, a strict distinction exists between Wahy (prophetic revelation, the exclusive domain of prophets carrying divine law) and Ilham (divine inspiration or angelic communication granted to non-prophets). Mainstream Twelver theology explicitly holds that Fatimah did not receive Wahy; rather, she is considered a Muhaddathah — one who speaks with angels — a category the Quran applies to figures such as the Virgin Mary (Note: Quran 3:45) and the mother of Moses. (Note: Quran 28:7) During the 75 days following her father's death, Fatimah had contact and communication with Gabriel, and her husband Ali wrote down and recorded what was conveyed to her, forming the Book of Fatimah. In Twelver theology, Fatimah occupies a unique cosmological position; she is regarded as al-Batul (the pure and severed from worldly impurity) and is considered among the Ahl al-Kisa, purified by the verse of purification. The Book of Fatimah, according to Shia tradition, did not contain legal rulings or a new scripture, but rather consisted of consolations, knowledge of future events, and the spiritual inheritance of Muhammad's household.

Sunni scholars reject the notion that Fatimah received any form of divine communication after Muhammad's death, holding that prophethood and all its associated forms concluded with Muhammad. According to the Twelver Shi'ite fifth Imam, however, this kind of inspiration is not the revelation of prophethood but rather like the inspiration (ilham) which came to Mary (mother of Jesus), (Note: Quran 3:45) the mother of Moses (Note: Quran 28:7) and to the bee. (Note: Quran 16:68)

== Khums ==
Khums is a tax amounting to one-fifth of Muslims' excess wealth from certain sources, directed toward specified causes. It is treated differently in Shi'ite and Sunni Islam. In Sunni Islam tradition, the scope of khums has historically been limited to the spoils of war, while according to Twelver religious practice, khums is an annual taxation on 20% of remaining profits after expenses. This wealth is collected and managed by Shi'ite religious leaders. However, according to the reformist scholar Musa al-Musawi, whose views have been contested by mainstream Shia authorities, the modern development of the practice of collecting khums exclusively by Shia religious leaders, especially the Sayyid clerical elite, is simply a case of the usurpation of the place of the hidden Imam Mahdi, and a means of enriching the clerical class.

Twelver theology grounds the obligation of khums in the Quran, (Note: Quran 8:41) and Shia jurists have developed an extensive jurisprudential tradition around its application and distribution. According to Shia tradition, khums is divided into two equal portions: the sahm al-Imam (share of the Imam), which during the occultation of the twelfth Imam is administered by qualified jurists on his behalf, and the sahm al-Sadat (share of the descendants of Muhammad), distributed among orphaned, poor, and needy members of Muhammad's household. Khums became a major source of income and financial independence for the clergy in Shi'ite regions, enabling the maintenance of an independent religious establishment outside of state control.

Shi'ites justify the practice of khums in part by noting that, unlike Sunni religious institutions which are frequently state-sponsored, Shia religious establishments in many countries operate without state funding and depend on khums for their independence. The Turkish Presidency of Religious Affairs, for example, trains and employs all of Turkey's Sunni imams and administers Sunni places of worship, despite the fact that Shias make up approximately 5% of Turkish citizens who participate on a non-voluntary basis in financing Sunni mosques and imams' salaries, while their own places of worship receive no state recognition or funding.

== Combining prayers ==
While Sunnis have 5 salat (prayer) sessions per day, Twelvers can opt to pray the 5 daily prayers with only 3 prayer times per day by doubling their prayers on 2 occasions—combining the 2nd prayer with the 3rd and the 4th prayer with the 5th. However, Sunnis argue this very practice defeats the purpose of having 5 distinct prayers, since God ordered 5 prayers for 5 separate times of the day rather than 5 prayers for 3 separate times of the day and that Shia have misrepresented the ambiguity of the issue in the Quran for their own convenience. Twelvers extract this ruling from the two most important sources of jurisprudence which are the Quran, which only mentions 3 times for prayer, and the Sunnah of the Messenger Muhammad who was praying this way, as it is also reported by Sunni sources as permissible distinctly during travel, thus they believe this backs their claims accepted within a Sunni point of view. It is reported from the hadith that the Messenger did this so that no one among his Ummah should be put to [unnecessary] hardship. In the Sunni tradition this usually refers to people in long journey or ill health or any other hardship rather than an arbitrary decision on the part of the worshipper regardless of hardship. Shias believe this is enough to reject any accusation of not basing their actions from Quran and Traditions.

== Rejection of predestination ==
Twelver Shia theology does not outright reject predestination. Rather, classical and contemporary Twelver theology rejects both absolute determinism (Jabriyya) and absolute free will (Qadariyya), instead adopting a theological middle ground known as Amr Bayn al-Amrayn ("a matter between two matters"), a principle traced back to Imam Ja'far al-Sadiq, the sixth Imam. Some sources have characterised this position as a rejection of predestination, though this characterisation is disputed by Twelver scholars who argue that the position affirms divine foreknowledge while rejecting the notion that human beings are compelled automatons with no moral agency.

This has led to Sunni criticism of Twelvers, along with their associated belief in Bada' (the manifestation of God's will), as being deniers of God's complete sovereignty, and as being imitators of the Mu'tazila school of Islamic theology (as per Sunni sayings). Twelver scholars have responded that while there are surface similarities between their position and that of the Mu'tazila, the doctrine of Amr Bayn al-Amrayn is theologically distinct, being rooted in the teachings of the Imams rather than rationalist Mu'tazilite philosophy. However some academics insist that Bada' is not a rejection of predestination.

Shia states that matters relating to human destiny are of two kinds: definite and indefinite. Shia argues that God has definite power over the whole of existence; however, whenever He wills, He can replace a given destiny with another, which is what is called indefinite destiny. Some of these changes of destiny are brought about by man himself, who can through his free will, his decisions, and his way of life lay the groundwork for a change in his destiny, as pointed out in the verse: Truly, God will not change the condition of a people as long as they do not change their state themselves. (Note: Quran 13:11) Both types of destinies, however, are contained within God's foreknowledge, Shia argues, so that there could be no sort of change (Bada) concerning His knowledge. God, in contrast to the belief attributed to Jews that the hand of God is tied, asserts: Nay, His hands are spread out wide.... (Note: Quran 5:64) Accordingly, as Sobhani puts it, "all groups in Islam regard 'bada' as a tenet of the faith, even if not all actually use the term."

== Corruption of the Quran ==
Twelvers are often criticised by Sunnis for believing that the Quran was altered by the Sahaba (companions of Muhammad). Groups such as the Deobandis accuse Twelvers of believing that the complete version of the original Quran is in the possession of their 12th Imam. Twelvers are also accused of believing that the present Quran is omitted of the verses which support the Imamate of Ali because Caliph Uthman removed them during his compilation of the book — noting the incompatibility of the belief that the codification and propagation of the Quran was truthfully undertaken by the Sahaba, who, in Shi'ite tradition, represent the earliest people to take the Caliphate from its rightful claimants and to have corrupted the religion of Islam. As a result, such Sunni groups reject the Shi'ite defense that they believe in the same Quran as Sunnis, accusing Shi'ites of lying in line with their practice of taqiyyah so as not to expose themselves to the certain Sunni backlash.

In reality, the Twelver consensus rejecting tahrif (corruption of the Quran) is not a modern development but is rooted in classical Shia scholarship. Classical pillars of Twelver theology including Shaykh al-Saduq (d. 991 CE), Sharif al-Murtaza (d. 1044 CE), and Shaykh al-Tusi (d. 1067 CE) explicitly documented and upheld the position that the Quran as it exists today is complete, uncorrupted, and identical to what was revealed to Muhammad. Sharif al-Murtaza in particular considered the integrity of the Quranic text to be a matter of decisive consensus (ijma) among Shia scholars, comparable in certainty to the historical transmission of other well-established facts. The mainstream Twelver position holds that while certain companions may have possessed personal annotated copies of the Quran containing commentary and contextual notes, this does not imply that the revealed text itself was altered or omitted. The contemporary Shi'ite scholar Abu al-Qasim al-Khoei states that even if the Book of Ali (a copy of the Quran written by Ali containing Ali's commentary, which is sometimes called the Book of Ali) incorporated additions that are not part of the existing Quran, this does not mean that these additions comprised parts of the Quran that were dropped due to alteration. Rather, these additions were interpretations or explanations of what God was saying, or were in the form of revelations from God explaining the intention of the verses in the Quran. These additions were not part of the Quran and not part of what the Messenger of God was commanded to convey to the Muslim community. Traces of earlier minority views on this question can be found in some books of Shi'ite ahadith such as Bihar al-Anwar, however these views have never represented the mainstream Twelver theological position and have been explicitly rejected by the majority of Shia jurists and theologians across history.

== Mourning of Muharram and Karbala ==
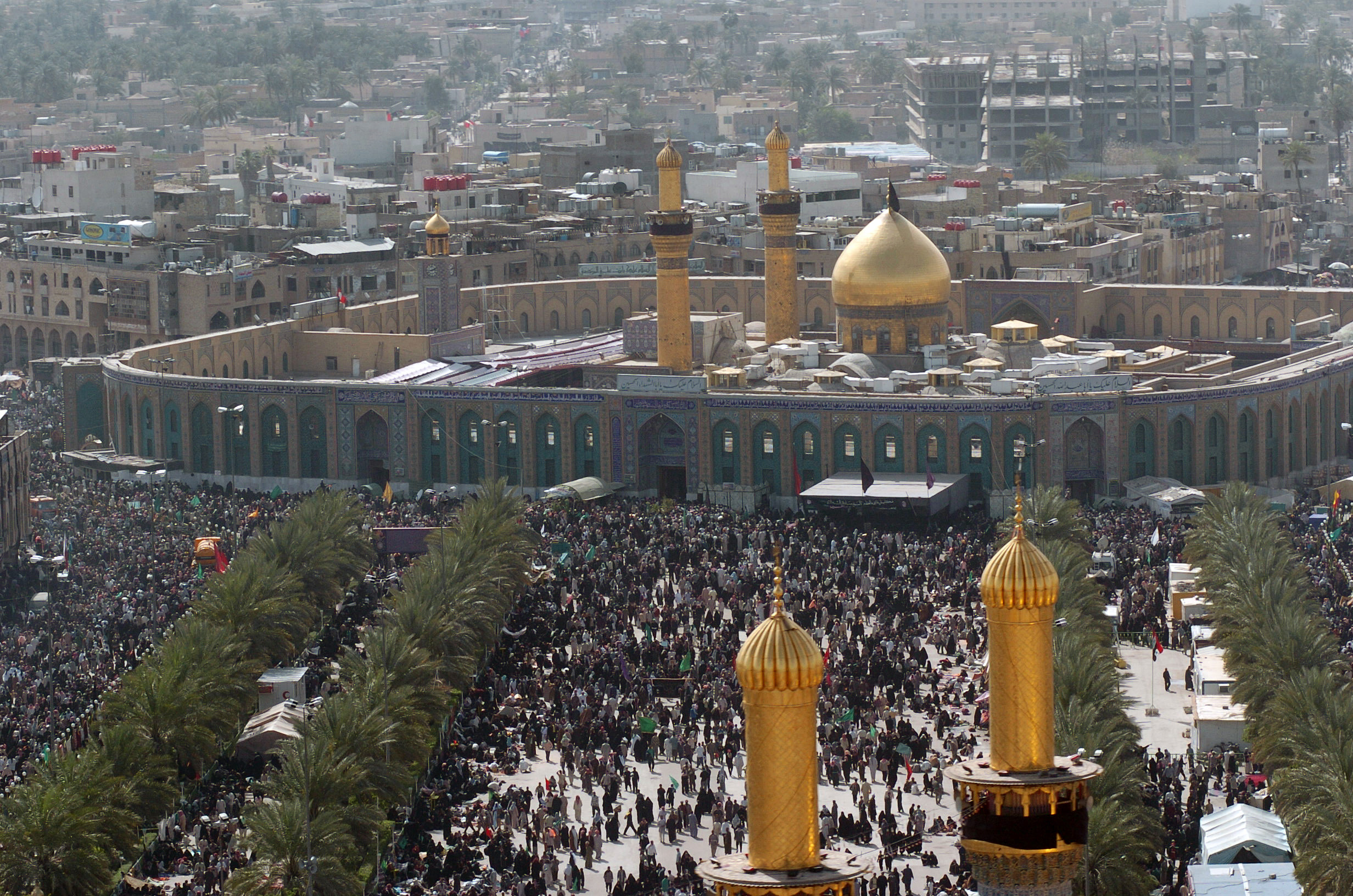
Shia pilgrims gather around the shrine of Husayn in Karbala, Iraq

Twelvers have been criticised for the practice of tatbir (a form of self-flagellation) during Ashura, the observation of the martyrdom of Husayn, traditionally accompanied by acts of ritual self-harm, which is often described as barbaric. The practice is contested among Shi'ite clerics themselves: while some traditionalist clerics permit Tatbir, the majority of contemporary senior marjas, including Ali Khamenei and Ali al-Sistani, deem it impermissible on the grounds that it constitutes self-harm and is haram in Islam, and that it damages the public image of Shia Muslims. Khamenei issued a fatwa on 14 June 1994 banning this practice, and Hezbollah in Lebanon similarly prohibits it. Central to understanding Shia mourning practices is the Twelver theological doctrine of redemptive suffering and the cosmic significance of the Battle of Karbala. In Twelver theology, the martyrdom of Husayn ibn Ali at Karbala is understood not merely as a historical tragedy but as a defining spiritual event of universal and eternal significance — a deliberate sacrifice made to preserve the integrity of Islam against tyranny, whose moral weight continues to demand active remembrance and lamentation from believers. Shia scholars argue that mourning for Husayn is not an innovation but is grounded in Quranic principles of honouring the symbols of Allah (Note: Quran 22:32) and in numerous narrations from Muhammad himself expressing grief over the fate of his grandson. Salafi Sunni scholars, such as Ibn Taymiyyah and Abd al-Aziz ibn Baz, have expressed the view that the commemoration of Ashura represents a form of Bid'ah (impermissible innovation). They argue that annual mourning ceremonies for Husayn were not established or practiced by Muhammad and therefore hold no basis in traditional Islamic practice. This bid'ah argument represents specifically the Salafi and Wahhabi theological position and is not representative of all Sunni scholarly opinion; traditional Hanafi, Maliki, and Shafi'i scholars have historically held considerably more varied and nuanced positions on the permissibility of mourning and lamentation, and many traditional Sunni scholars have themselves expressed veneration for Husayn and grief at his martyrdom. Similarly, Ibn Rajab, in his Kitab al-Lata'if, argued that neither God nor Muhammad prescribed days of mourning for the calamities or deaths of prophets, let alone for others of lesser status. Twelvers have also been accused of raising Karbala in Iraq to a level of holiness above even Mecca, Medina and Jerusalem, which is "frowned upon by Sunnis." This is exemplified by the attribution of the title Karbala-i for one who has performed pilgrimage there, its annual attraction of more pilgrims for Ashura and Arba'een than the Hajj, prostrating during salat on turbah commonly made from the clay of Karbala, and numerous ahadith attributed to the Imams which critics interpret as placing the land of Karbala above the Kaaba.

In Twelver theology, the elevated spiritual status of Karbala derives directly from the cosmic significance attributed to Husayn's martyrdom; the land is considered sanctified by the blood of the grandson of Muhammad and the third Imam, and Shia scholars argue that venerating it is an extension of venerating the Ahl al-Bayt themselves, not a displacement of Mecca or the Kaaba in terms of obligatory religious duties. The obligation of pilgrimage to Mecca remains as it is — an obligation — and in Twelver theology and ruling, an obligation will always hold more weight than a recommended act.

== Violence and persecution ==
This section concerns the actions and policies of the Islamic Republic of Iran as a modern theocratic state, and of Shia-aligned political and military actors in the broader Middle East. These geopolitical and human rights matters are distinct from the theological doctrines of Twelver Shia Islam as a religious tradition, and should not be conflated with criticism of Twelver theology itself. Iran is accused of the persecution of its Sunni minority and the historical persecution of Sunnis since at least Safavid times. This historical context is itself shaped by centuries of anti-Shia persecution; the Safavid adoption of Twelver Shia Islam as the state religion in the 16th century emerged partly as a response to sustained Sunni Ottoman and Uzbek military pressure and the suppression of Shia communities across the broader Islamic world. Despite an estimated one million Sunni Muslims living in Tehran province alone, no dedicated Sunni mosque has been permitted to be built in Tehran or other major Iranian cities such as Isfahan, Shiraz, and Mashhad; while the Iranian government has claimed the existence of Sunni prayer spaces in the capital, prominent Sunni leaders and human rights organisations maintain that these are informal prayer rooms rather than dedicated mosques. Iran is also accused of supporting the suppression of Sunnis in such countries as Lebanon, Syria and Iraq, both directly and through the militias it funds, such as Hezbollah and private militias in Iraq. Another common target of persecution by the Iranian Twelver religious establishment is the Baháʼí community, which itself originates from a movement that emerged within a Shia milieu.

Twelvers have themselves been and continue to be victims of widespread anti-Shia violence globally. As a minority denomination within Islam, Shia communities have faced systematic persecution, massacres, and sectarian violence across South Asia, the Arab world, and beyond, carried out by both state and non-state actors including ISIS and other Salafi-jihadist groups who consider Shia Muslims to be apostates.

== See also ==
- Criticism of Islam
- Criticism of religion
- Islamic schools and branches
- Akhbari-Usuli Controversies
- Shia–Sunni relations
- Sunni fatwas on Shias
- Shi'ite iconography
