= Mohammad Jamil Hammoud al-Amili =

Shia Islamic jurist

Grand Ayatollah Muḥammad Jamīl Ḥammūd al-ʿĀmilī
- محمد جميل حمود العاملي
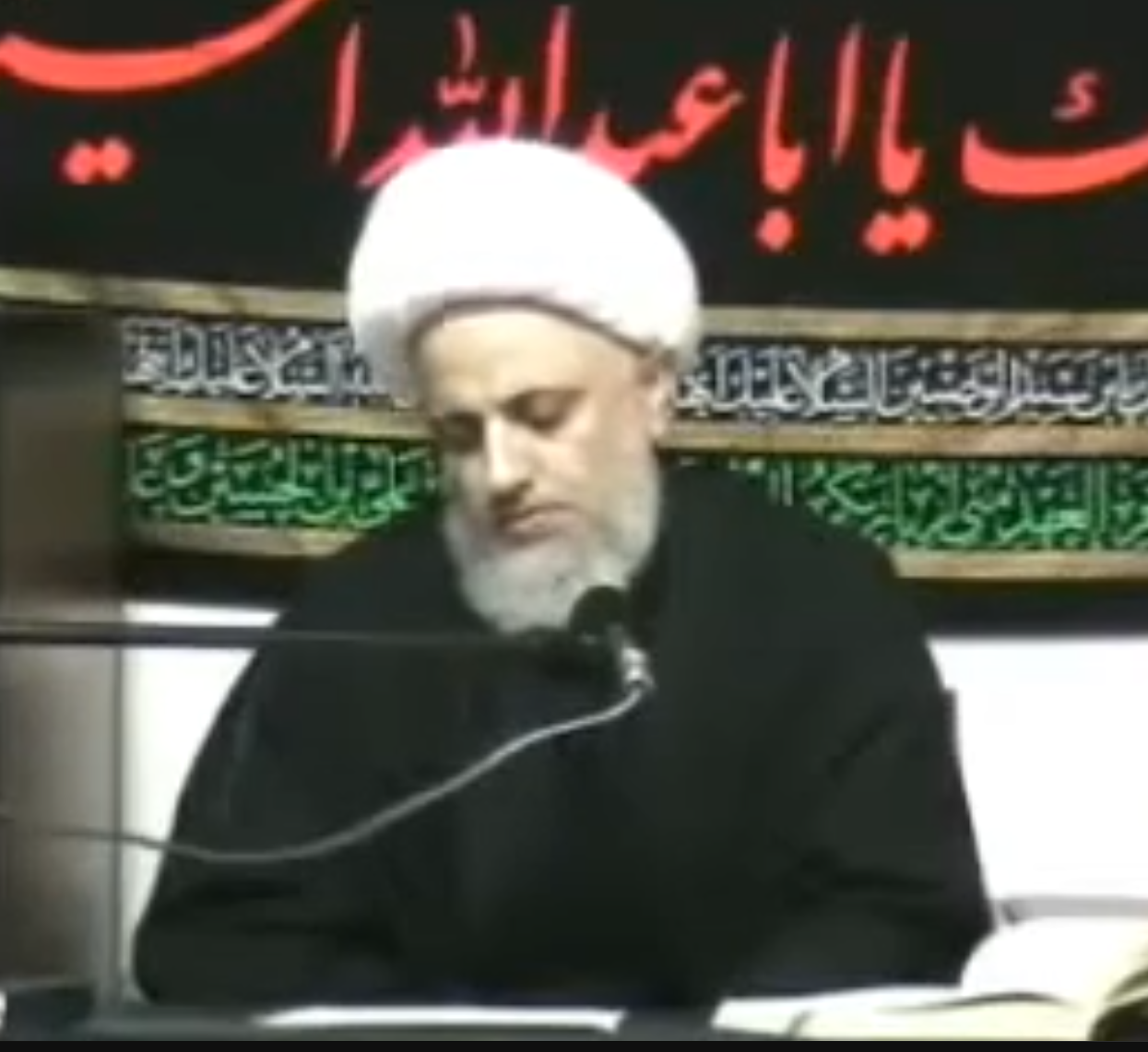
- Al-Amili during a lecture in 2013

Personal life
- Born: 1959 (age 66–67) Jabal Amil, Lebanon

Religious life
- Religion: Islam
- Denomination: Twelver Shia
- Jurisprudence: Jafari
- Creed: Usuli

Muslim leader
- Teacher: Abu al-Qasim al-Khoei; Mahmoud Hashemi Shahroudi; Hossein Mazaheri; Abdollah Javadi Amoli; Shahab ud-Din Mar'ashi Najafi
- Arabic name
- Personal (Ism): Muḥammad محمد
- Epithet (Laqab): Jamil Hammoud جميل حمود
- Toponymic (Nisba): al-Amili الحاتمي العاملي

Mohammad Jamil Hammoud al-Amili (Arabic: محمد جميل حمود العاملي; born 1959) is a Lebanese Twelver Shi'a Marja' who is known for strict Shia fundamentalism, and having Akhbari-like tendencies.

== Biography ==
=== In Lebanon ===
Born in the year 1959 in Jabal Amil, his family ended up settling in Beirut during his childhood to find work, where they had four sons and three daughters, of which al-Amili was the eldest.

His grandfather ʿAbd al-Ḥusayn traced his origins to the town of Meidoun, located in the western Beqaa Governorate, near Sohmor, from which he eventually ended up moving to Markaba, close to the Palestinian Galilee, where he married multiple women and had children, among them al-Amili's father. Amili's father died when he was still young, leaving him an orphan. When his father reached his twenties, he married a woman named Fāṭimah, the daughter of a man named Qāsim ʿAlāʾ al-Dīn, whose lineage traces back to the Āl Zuhrah family from Aleppo.

Al-Amili grew up in poverty, which forced him to work during holidays while still in elementary school, in order to earn enough money to keep attending. He went on to spend a large portion of his life both working and studying until he graduated from intermediate school in 1974.

In 1975, after the Lebanese Civil War began, he enrolled in a shi'i seminary, where he first studied under Shaykh Muḥammad Ḥasan al-Qubaysī, and later under Shaykh Ḥusayn Maʿtūq.

=== Further studies ===
After ascending to higher education, he went on to study under ʿAllāmah Muḥammad Jawād Mughniyyah, who recommended al-Amili to the Qom Seminary, though al-Qubaysī and Shaykh Maʿtūq had counseled him to go to Najaf Seminary. Since his financial situation wasn't able to support either, he was forced instead to depart for Syria, where he studied under Abu al-Qasim al-Khoei, and ʿAllāmah al-Sayyid Aḥmad al-Wāḥidī in Damascus.

After graduating from Syria, he chose to further his studies in Qom, where he studied under major scholars such as Sayyid Aḥmad al-Madadī, Shaykh Muṣṭafā al-Harandī, and Ayatollah Muhammad al-Gharawi (relative of Muhammad Hossein Gharavi), with whom he had a particularly close relationship.

He then advanced to the higher-level courses under Ayatollah Shahab ud-Din Mar'ashi Najafi, Ayatollah Mahmoud Hashemi Shahroudi, Shaykh Abdollah Javadi Amoli, Shaykh Muḥammad al-Ṣādiqī, Ayatollah Hossein Mazaheri and Sayyid ʿAbd al-Karīm al-Kashmīrī, who encouraged him to return to Lebanon, due to a perceived lack of religious authority after the passing of Mohammad Hussein Fadlallah.

== Fatwas (rulings) and statements ==
=== Fatwas ===
==== Taqlid ====
Al-Amili considers absolute Taqlid a major prohibition, to the point where he doesn't accept muqallids that agree with him on every issue. This has led many Usuli jurists to accuse him of siding with the Akhbari school. He responded by asserting himself as an Usuli, but admitting to incorporating mixed Ijtihad into his rulings.

==== Khums ====
He stated due to misuse of the khums, that it is permissible to give direct donations to needy Shias and Sayyids from the sahm al-sadat, effectively reducing the portion of the marja' to 10%, as well as emphasizing that the 20% khums tax is only to be given after covering one's own expenses first (due to misuse).

==== Tatbir ====
Like Bashir al-Najafi, Sadiq al-Shirazi and Wahid Khorasani, all of whom are close acquaintances of his, he considers tatbir permissible, and even desirable. He himself has been filmed engaging in the practice with some students of his.

==== Images ====
Al-Amili ruled that the prohibition on any form of created imagery should be an uncontroversial opinion in Jafari fiqh, he went on to claim that image-making in contemporary Shia Islam is a form of "Christian spirituality."

==== Veiling ====
He very explicitly ruled a full Burqa to be mandatory, going so far as to call the Niqab a form of "adornment," because it displays the eyes. He also cites ahadith about the refusal of Fatima to unveil her face to non-mahrams, in order to solidify his ruling.

==== Aqidah ====
Publishing fatwas on Aqidah is both a heresy and an innovation according to al-Amili, he went on to state that this was one of his primary reasons for rejecting the rulings of his predecessor, Mohammad Hussein Fadlallah.

==== Female autonomy ====
He ruled that a woman who leaves her male guardian's house without asking for his permission, and being accompanied by him, has transgressed. They are also barred from having any Social media.

==== Inheritance ====
Women inheriting property, land, housing, cars etc. was ruled to be unanimously prohibited, and only permissible for men; a woman is only permitted to inherit a share of objects under the category of "movables."

==== Polygyny and Mu'tah ====
Al-Amili holds a somewhat utilitarian view of Polygyny, having published a fatwa outlining its physical, humanitarian, societal, legislative and political positives. Mut'ah is regarded as permissble, and occasionally recommended; when asked about a man who married more than four wives, he specified that it is not permissible "in a permanent contract," implying he shares the traditionalist opinion of Kamal al-Haydari, that the amount of temporary marriages is unlimited.

==== Sayyid exogamy ====
He ruled that it is permissible for a Sayyid female to marry a non-Sayyid male, and that there are no narrations prohibiting such a marriage.

==== Wilayat al-Faqih and Hudud ====
He claims that there is no consensus, or reliable ruling on the matter of Wilayat al-faqih, though openly stating that he doesn't recognize it. He expanded on the matter in another fatwa, where he grounded his reasoning to being insufficient Hudud from the Iranian government, even though they subscribe to the view that Hudud is obligatory, which he claimed not to follow, due to arguing there being no Imam to legislate it, or at least a faqīh being limited to what the Imams previously legislated, which in his view, they don't do either.

==== Sex change ====
He published multiple fatwas in which he ruled that any form of sex change, whether hormonal, operational or otherwise, are unanimously prohibited.

==== Meeting Muhammad al-Mahdi ====
He holds that "meeting" Muhammad al-Mahdi in the present age is a real possibility according to various Twelver Shi'a narrations; he tries to reconcile other contradictory narrations by making a semantic differentiation between "seeing" the Mahdi (which is described as kufr) and "meeting" the Mahdi; he did not elaborate on the extent to which the two are different, and went on to claim to have "met" the Mahdi twice himself.

==== Homemaking ====
In multiple fatwas, he ruled it to be obligatory for a wife to engage in homemaking, and that the sin of a woman who doesn't do so falls on the husband.

==== Marriage to promiscuous women ====
Being in a permanent marriage with women known for, or suspected of promiscuous behavior until proven otherwise, was ruled unanimously prohibited by al-Amili. He also considers it to be a Naseeha for men to warn other men of the immoral behavior of a woman they're considering for marriage, rather than ruling it to be backbiting, and that being engaged in any form of civil marriage makes one an adulterer.

==== Gazing at infidel women ====
He ruled it to be permissible for Muslim men to look at dhimmi, or infidel women, without lowering their gaze, because they do not enjoy islamic rights, and don't have the same privileges.

==== Child marriage ====
He disavows the ruling that a male may consummate marriage with a girl "as young as an infant," however he stays in line with previous scholarship in advocating for marriage of girls whose bodies can "withstand sexual intercourse." He does however still consider non-penetrative acts permissible.

=== Personal Opinions ===
==== Historiography ====
He considers traditional Shia historical opinion to be that Aisha poisoned Muhammad, that Umar killed Fatima, and that Muawiya killed Aisha.

==== Philosophy ====
He considers philosophy to require rationalism as its foundation, and rejects it entirely on that basis, preferring irfan as the primary source of epistemology, though explicitly excluding that expressed in sufism as "misguided."
