= Vaezi =

Vaezi (Persian: واعظی; adjective form of واعظ (wāʿiẓ), a Persian noun of Arabic origin meaning "preacher") is a surname. Notable people with the surname include:

- Ahmad Vaezi (born 1962), Iranian philosopher, scholar, and clergyman
- Hojjatollah Vaezi (born 1977), Iranian archer
- Mehdi Vaezi (born 1975), Iranian footballer
- Shamsodin Vaezi (born 1936), Iraqi Grand Ayatollah
