= Mohammad Yaqoobi =

Iraqi Grand Ayatollah

Grand Ayatollah Muhammad al-Yaqoobi
- محمد اليعقوبي
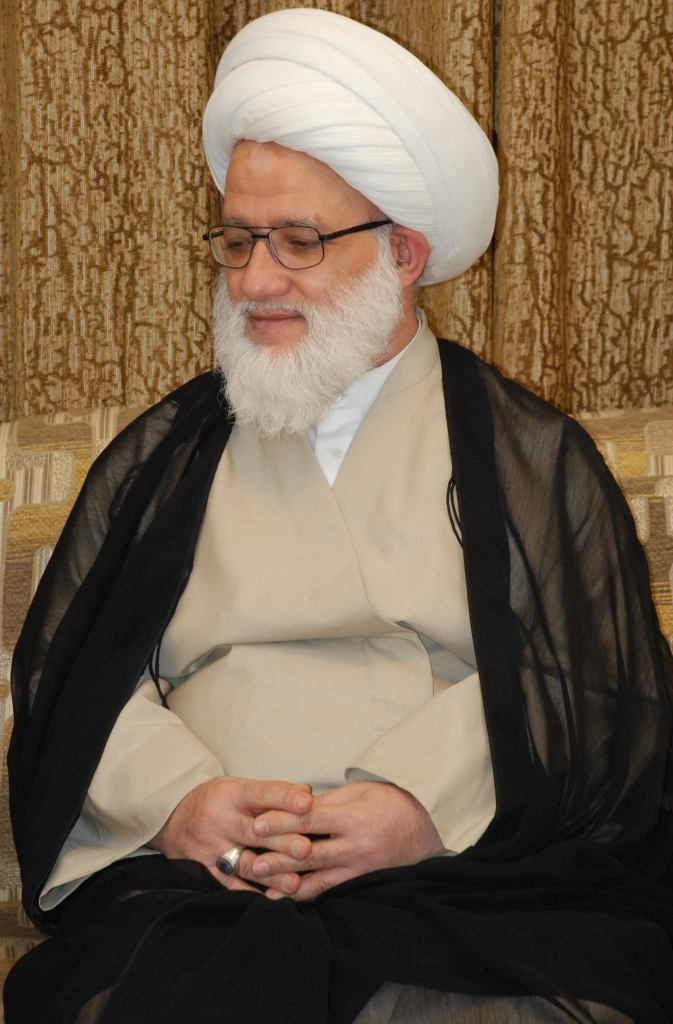
- Title: Grand Ayatollah

Personal life
- Born: September 9, 1960 (age 66) Najaf, Iraq
- Website: www.yaqoobi.com

Religious life
- Religion: Usuli Twelver Shi`a Islam
- Teachers: Abu al-Qasim al-Khoei; Muhammad Baqir al-Sadr; Mohammad Sadeqi Tehrani; Muhammad Sadiq al-Sadr

Senior posting
- Based in: Najaf, Iraq
- Post: Grand Ayatollah
- Period in office: 2003–present
- Predecessor: Muhammad Baqir al-Sadr, Mohammad Mohammad Sadeq al-Sadr

Mohammad Musa al-Yaqoobi (Arabic: محمد موسى اليعقوبي; born September 9, 1960) is a prominent Iraqi Twelver Shi'a Marja'. He is the second most widely followed Marja' in Iraq, the most widely followed being Ali al-Sistani. As well as heading the Al-Sadr Religious University in Najaf, he established one of the largest Hawzas in Iraq, and oversees many charitable organizations. He is an active figure within Iraqi politics, and is considered to be the spiritual successor of Mohammad Mohammad Sadeq al-Sadr and the school of Muhammad Baqir al-Sadr, with the former famously naming Yaqoobi his successor in an audio recording.

== Education ==
Yaqoobi graduated with a BA in civil engineering from the University of Baghdad in 1982 and joined the Hawza Najaf in 1988. In Najaf, he studied under various scholars, most notably Ayatollah Abu al-Qasim al-Khoei, under whom he was ordained with his religious turban, as well as Ayatollah Mohammad Mohammad Sadeq al-Sadr, and Mohammad Baqir al-Sadr. He maintained a close relationship with Grand Ayatollah Mohammad Mohammad Sadeq al-Sadr, who, amongst others, granted him his Ijtihad in 1998. Amongst these testimonies is the Ijtihad testimony of Mohammad Sadeqi Tehrani, the well known expert exegete of the Quran and student of Muhammad Husayn Tabatabai who in particular highlights Yaqoobi's expertise in deriving religious law from the Quran.

== Social and cultural activities ==
Before founding his first real charitable organization in 2013, Yaqoobi gave a statement in 2008 after founding the Islamic Engineers Association, where he emphasized that the goal of his institutions should be to turn their consumptive infrastructure into productive enterprises, promoting enough economic development, so that instead of merely exhausting donations, they could achieve economic self-sufficiency, he firmly restated this goal in 2018.

Among his activities, is the establishment of various institutions:

- Faydh al-Zahra, a charitable organization providing monthly welfare to struggling families, housing repairs/furnishing, marriage financing and employment assistance
- Bayt al-Sa'id, a charitable organization supporting and promoting marriage, providing marriage & family counseling, as well as financial assistance to newlyweds
- Islamic Engineers Association, an enterprise bringing qualified engineers together to establish productive businesses and participate in building Iraq's public infrastructure
- Al-Sadr Religious University, with more than 20 branches and about 2,000 students.
- Al-Zahra University, which is for women and has more than 14 branches.
- Islamic television networks, including Al-Naeem, Al-Bilad, Al-Amal, and Subul al-Salam.
- The Alawi Sayyids Association, which supports and cares for impoverished Alid Sayyids.

== Fatwas ==
=== Taqlid ===
He ruled that Taqlid (emulation) is not legally obligatory according to the Usuli creed, and that one may remain a Ghair muqallid out of Ihtiyat (precaution); splitting Taqlid (known as Tab'idh) is permissible and in certain circumstances even obligatory according to him; one does not require special authorization to follow or propagate the fatwas concerning the secondary Marja's specialty. He also permits for the secondary Marja that one follows to also be a deceased scholar, provided one receives authorization from the living Marja.

=== Tatbir ===
Yaqoobi is considered an opponent of Tatbir, Qama-Zani and similar practices, urging his followers to abandon them, he demonstrated the practice to not be reliably transmitted from the Ahl al-Bayt, and deemed it impermissible.

=== Images ===
He categorically prohibits the creation of all kinds of sculpture of living creatures, though generally permitting making various kinds of two-dimensional graphic art. Praying in spaces containing two-dimensional images of living beings however, is disliked.

=== Tattoos ===
He issued conditional prohibitions on Tattooing, due to bodily harm/health hazard and adornment.

=== Music ===
Yaqoobi is generally permissive towards the various kinds of instrumental music.

=== Veiling ===
He praise face-veiling and encourages followers to practice it whenever possible, uncovering the face and hands on its own is however considered permissible, though it conditionally may become Ihtiyat Mustahab in an environment with non-mahrams that could cause fitna; his general ruling is that veiling the face is highly recommended, but keeping the unadorned face unveiled, in an appropriate environment without fitna, is permissible on its own.

=== Khums ===
He authorizes and encourages his followers to redistribute one third of the entire Khums to needy Believers, he also permits going beyond the one third portion, but requires them to receive permission out of precaution, emphasizing that the entirety is still under the authority of the jurist.

=== Zakat ===
Yaqoobi ruled that Zakat may be given to a person beyond the recipient's ordinary expenses. Zakat can also be used to eradicate someone's debt, even if that person is capable of financial maintenance. Giving Zakat directly to the needy is permissible and encouraged, even to a single person, though distributing it via the Marja's office is preferable.

The obligatory equal recipients of Zakat are: 1) Those who cannot fully finance a full year's living expenses 2) Those suffering consequences of severe poverty such as starvation and homelessness 3) Officials that have been authorized redistribute Zakat on behalf of the spender 4) Muslims whose limited financial capabilities impair their religious commitment 5) Muslims who are enslaved or in-bond 6) Muslims who are in debt 7) Muslim projects that may benefit welfare 8) Those who went to travel and cannot finance their return home.

== Political views ==
On July 4, 2010, Mohammad Yaqoobi gave a controversial statement of condolence regarding the passing of Hezbollah-affiliated scholar Muhammad Husayn Fadlallah, the two had a historically cordial relationship, despite the denouncement of Fadlallah by various other Iraqi scholars; he also used the statement to proclaim the legitimacy of Fadlallah's religious authority indefinitely, and to praise his moral character.

Between January 2017 and May 2024, Yaqoobi frequently met with PMF deputy commander Abu Mahdi al-Muhandis; he praised the fighters and their victories, and discussed military strategy, as well as what he called their various humanitarian achievements.

On June 13, 2025, Mohammad Yaqoobi condemned the Israeli attack on Iran, calling the attacks on residential areas, nuclear facilities, and service centers in Iran “barbaric attacks.” He said that Israel was founded on oppression and aggression, and that these attacks were intended to force Muslim nations to surrender. Yaqubi also referred to the killing of Iranian commanders and nuclear scientists, saying that the fate of all humans is death, but there is a difference between someone who dies as a martyr and someone who faces humiliation and torment.

On March 1, 2026, Mohammad Yaqubi issued a message condoling the death of Ali Khamenei, referring to him as the “leader of the Islamic Revolution.” Yaqubi said that Khamenei had achieved his long-sought wish of martyrdom in the way of God.

== Works ==
Sheikh Mohammad Ya'qoubi has authored numerous works across various scholarly and religious fields, including: Fiqh al-Khilaf, Subul al-Salam, Manasik al-Hajj, al-Riyadiyyat lil-Faqih, Malamih min Tarikh, Khitaab al-Qiyadah al-Diniyyah fi al-Iraq, Thalathah Yashkun, Dawr al-A'immah fi al-Hayah al-Islamiyyah, Qanadil al-'Arifin, al-Uswah al-Hasanah, al-Ma'alim al-Mustaqbaliyyah lil-Hawzah al-'Ilmiyyah, al-Fiqh al-Ijtima'i, Nahnu wa al-Gharb, Min Wahy al-Ghadir, and Fiqh Talabat al-Jami'at.

== See also ==
- List of maraji
- Mohammad Hussein Fadlallah
