= Kamal al-Haydari =

Shia marja' from Iraq

Grand Ayatollah Sayyid Kamal al-Husayni al-Haydari
- السيد كمال الحسيني الحيدري
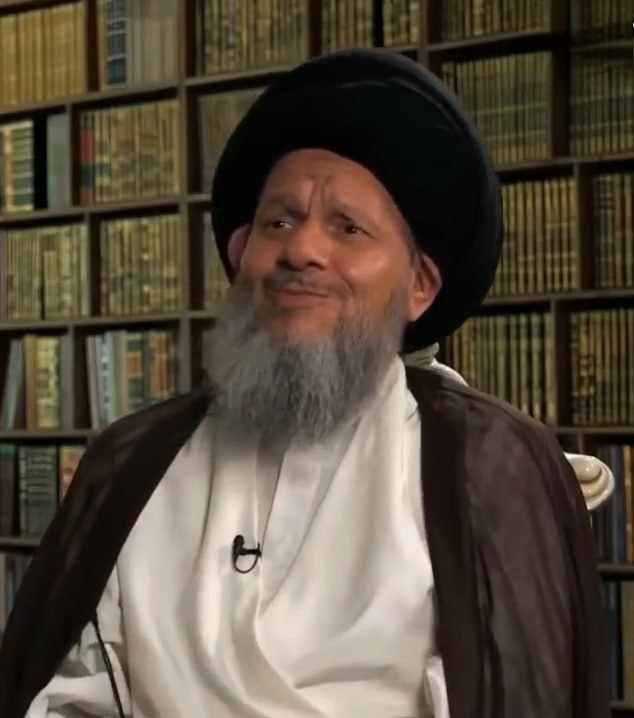
- Al-Haydari in 2018
- Title: Grand Ayatollah

Personal life
- Born: Kamal Baqir-Hasan al-Husayni al-Haydari; 1956 (age 69–70) Karbala, Kingdom of Iraq
- Notable idea(s): Naqd al-Turath, Islamic Humanism
- Website: official website

Religious life
- Religion: Islam
- Denomination: Shia
- Jurisprudence: Ja'fari (Usuli)
- Creed: Twelver

Muslim leader
- Teacher: al-Khoei; Baqir al-Sadr; Jawad Tabrizi; Abbas Quchani; Hassanzadeh; Javadi Amoli
- Based in: Qom, Iran

Grand Ayatollah Sayyid Kamal al-Husayni al-Haydari (Arabic: كمال الحسيني الحيدري; born 1956) is an Iraqi Islamic philosopher and a Shia marja'.

Al-Haydari's intellectual output can be loosely grouped with a critical school within Islamic studies sometimes known as Madrasat Naqd al-Turath (school of criticising [religious] heritage), or simply Naqd al-Turath, which is generally known for being critical of "accepted" or purportedly "orthodox" truths in Twelver Shia Islam, and calls for a renewed examination of previously thought of "unassailable" texts or opinions.

He resides in Qom, Iran. He has argued that Twelver Shi'i Usuli thought has by large evolved from a rational/theologically centered school of thought into a jurisprudentially centered school.

== Background ==
Al-Haydari was born into a renowned Karbalaei family, that goes back to their patriarch Mir Haidar al-Husayni, a descendant of the fourth Shi'ite Imam, Ali Zayn al-Abideen. His great-grandfather, Sayyid Abdullah al-Haydari (d. 1899) was a grand scholar, and is buried in the Imam Husayn shrine, along with his children. They played a large role in the expansion of the courtyard of the shrine from the south eastern side.

== Early life and education ==
Al-Haydari was born in 1956 to Baqir al-Haydari, a well-known cloth dealer in Karbala. He completed his elementary, middle and high school education in public schools. His family wanted him to pursue a career in medicine or engineering, but he chose to go down the religious academic path.

=== Education ===
He studied his primary religious studies in Karbala under scholars such as Sheikh Ali al-Eithan al-Ahsa'i, and his son Sheikh Husayn al-Eithan. He then moved to Najaf in 1974 to study at the College of Jurisprudence. He also took lessons at the religious seminary, completing his sutooh studies with Ayatollah Sayyid Muhammad-Taqi al-Hakim and Ayatollah Sayyid Abd al-Saheb al-Hakim. He then began his Bahath al-Kharij studies with Ayatollah Sayyid Abu al-Qasim al-Khoei, Ayatollah Sayyid Muhammad-Baqir al-Sadr, Ayatollah Sheikh Ali al-Gharawi, and Sayyid Nasrallah al-Mustanbit. In 1978 Al-Haydari gained his intermediate degree in Islamic sciences, with honors from the Hawza of Najaf.

He then migrated to Kuwait in 1980 due to the rising pressures from the Ba'thist authorities, and then to Damascus, where he remained for nearly four months. He then left for Iran via Turkey and settled in the city of Qom in 1983. In Qom, he resumed his studies under some of the most learned such as Ayatollah Mirza Jawad Tabrizi and Ayatollah Sheikh Wahid Khorasani. He finally received his Ijazah 6 years later, from Ayatollah Sheikh Javadi Amoli, and Ayatollah Sheikh Hassanzadeh Amoli, after which he began his research for his first Risalah, which he finally published in 2012, thereby announcing his Marjaʿiyyah.

== Religious career ==
Al-Haydari began his marja'iyah in 2012. He has been known to be relatively controversial, including his critiques of the opinions of classical scholars such al-Saduq, al-Mufid and al-Hilli, as well as rejecting the idea of unanimity when it came to doctrinal matters. However, his critique that caused the most uproar in his sphere is his contention that much of the surviving traditions in the four main books are a product of forgeries, known as Israʼiliyyat.

He gained a lot of traction on al-Kawthar TV, where he hosted a show and discussed religious matters in the Quran and Hadith. However the show was cancelled in 2013 due to controversial remarks by al-Haydari.

In 2019, al-Haydari supported the demonstrations during the October Revolution in Iraq stating:

Corruption has become a phenomenon in the public life of the country facing no religious or legal deterrence. The demonstrations that erupted and that will break out are only a natural reaction to this corruption.

== Works ==
=== Quranic Books ===
- Koran preservation from distortion
- Interpretation of the Koran
- Logic of understanding of the Koran - methodological foundations of explanation and interpretation in the light of a verse of the Kursi (3 parts)
- Pulp of interpretation of the book Koran
- Miracles between theory and practice
- Piety in the Qur'an
- Joseph the righteous
- Interpretative approach of Allamah al-Haydari
- Assets of interpretation (two parts)

=== Ideological Books ===
- Science of Imam, researches in fact and matters of the science of infallible Imams
- Landmarks of Umayyad Islam
- Tawheed (two parts)
- Tawheed lessons
- Researches in Creed (two parts)
- Formative mandate, its reality and manifestations
- Philosophy of Religion
- Firmly grounded in science
- Concept of intercession in the Qur'an
- In the shadow of faith and morals
- Understanding of religion
- Intercession
- Infallibility - analytical researches in light of the Quranic approach
- Ma'aad in Koranic vision (two parts)
- The Greatest Name, its truth and manifestations
- Hyperbole, its reality and divisions
- Bada and how it occurs in the divine science
- Fate and destiny and the problematic of human act disability
- Authority and making of situation and interpretation
- Tawheed of Sheikh Ibn Taymiyyah
- Researches on the Imamate

=== Philosophical Books ===
- The Philosophy of Mulla Sadra Shirazi: a Reading in the Focal Points of Transcendent Wisdom
- Ma'aad (the Return)
- Intellect, Intellector, and Intellected
- Philosophy (two parts)
- An Introduction to the Theory of Knowledge as discussed among Islamic Philosophers
- The Essential School of Thought concerning the Theory of Knowledge
- Explorations in Philosophical Psychology
- Commentary on the End of Wisdom (by Allameh Tabataba'i) (two parts)
- Lessons on Transcendental Wisdom (two parts)
- Commentary on Muzzaffar's Logic (five parts)
- Commentary on the Beginning of Wisdom (by Allameh Tabataba'i) (two parts)
- Divine ideals: Analytical Research concerning the Theory of Plato

=== Fiqh Books ===
- No Damage, nor reciprocating
- Fiqh approach of Allamah al-Haydari
- A necessary denier, his truth, terms and rules
- Zakat is due and the dispute of its identification
- Landmarks of Fiqh Renewal
- Book (Zakat)
- Selections from the provisions of the women
- Elected of Hajj and Umrah Rites
- Rites of Hajj
- Fataawa Fiqhiyyah - Worship (two parts)
- Fataawa Fiqhiyyah - Transactions
- Research in the jurisprudence of the sales contract
- One fifth of gains profit

=== Fundamentals of Islamic Jurisprudence Books ===
- Conjecture, a study in the authoritative and its divisions and its provisions.
- Explanation of the first episode of Sayed Mohammed Baqir al-Sadr
- Explanation of the third episode of Sayed Mohammed Baqir al-Sadr (two parts)
- Explanation of the third episode of Sayed Mohammed Baqir al-Sadr
- Explanation of the second episode for Sayed Mohammed Baqir al-Sadr (four parts)
- The Reality
- The Fixed and variable in religious knowledge
- Philosophy of Mohammed Albaaj

=== Moral books ===
- Introduction to Ethics
- Tawbah, its reality, conditions and effects
- Spiritual Education
- Innovations of Allamah Al-Haydari, in the methodology, Tawheed and Imamate
- Priorities methodology in understanding religious knowledge
- Du'aa

=== Books on Gnosis ===
- Knowledge of God (two parts)
- From Creation to the Real (min al-khalq ila al-haqq)
- Shiite Gnosis (Irfan)
- Commentary on Establishing Principles (by Ibn Turka) (two parts)
