= Ibrahim Memon Madani =

Islamic scholar

Ibrahim Memon Madani is an influential scholar who was born in Medina. He moved to England in 1980 where he completed his Hifz ul-Quran and Aalim course. He, along with his brothers and father, are widely accredited with establishing the second Islamic higher education institute in North America after Al-Rashid Islamic Institute https://alrashid.ca/. In 1987, he was appointed imam of the mosque in Waterloo, Ontario and in 1991 he moved to Buffalo, New York with his father and brothers to establish the Darul-Uloom Al-Madania. His father later established Darul-Uloom Canada in Chatham, Canada. He is regarded as one of the most influential imams with a particularly large following in North America, Europe, and South Africa.
