= Al-Sayyed Mohsen al-Amin =

Islamic scholar

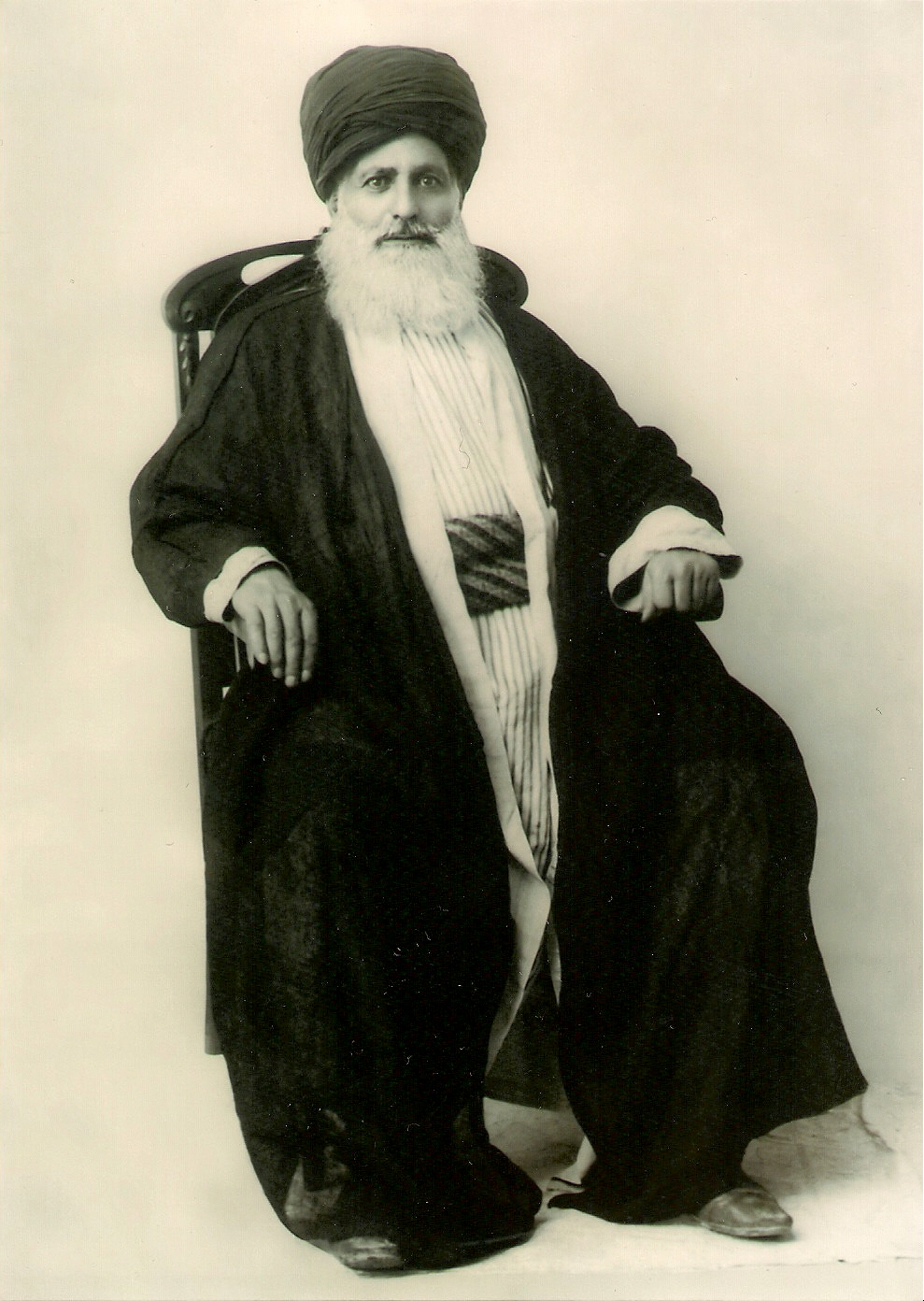
- Grand Ayatollah Al-Sayyed Mohsen al-Amin
- Born: 1867; Jabal 'Amel, Lebanon
- Died: 1952 (aged 84–85); Sayyidah Zaynab Mosque

Philosophical work
- Region: Southern lebanese Scholar
- School: Shia Twelver

Al-Sayyed Mohsen al-Amin (b.1284 A.H./1867 C.E. - d.1371 A.H. /1952 C.E.), also transliterated Muhsin al Amin, was a Shia scholar, biographer, traditionist, and jurist. He was born in Jabal Amil, Lebanon. His most important work is A'yan al-Shi'a.

== Early life and education ==
=== Family background ===
Al-Amin was born in 1867 to a well-known Sayyid family in Jabal Amil, Lebanon. His father, Abdul al-Karim al-Amili, was a scholar of his time. His father died in Iraq was buried, when he had gone to pilgrimage in Iraq. His maternal grandfather was ′Shaykh Muhammad Hussein al Amili al Musawi, was one of the scholars who went to Najaf for education and died there.

=== Education ===
Sayyed Mohsen began to study the Qur'an and elementary Arabic grammar at the age of seven under a village teacher. Four years later, he learned jurisprudence for three years under Shaykh Musa Sharara who returned to Iraq. In 1890, arrangements were made for him to study in Najaf, Iraq. Finally he was a learned Mujtahid.

=== Activity ===
He was among the first Shi’i modernists and received widespread condemnation by the Shia community of Lebanon for his endeavours in attempting to change and reform the religion, particularly when it came to issues of tatbir, which he was against.

== His children ==
- Hasan al-Amin
- Hashem Al-Amin
- Abd al-Muttalib Al-Amin
- Jafar Al-Amin
- Muhammad Baqir Al-Amin

== Published works ==
- Ayan al-Shia (Arabic: أعيان الشيعة), is one of his works. This work the biographical encyclopedia book and consists of fifty-six volumes.
- Al-husun al-mani'a fi radd ma awradahu sahib al-manar fi haqq al-shia (Arabic: الحصون المنیعة فی ردّ ما اورده صاحب المنار فی حقّ الشیعة), he explained some of the Shia views in this book.
- Risalat al-tanzih li-a'mal al-shabih (Arabic: رسالة التنزيه لاعمال الشبيه), that was al-Amin's reply to his critics-Sadiq.
- Al-Sahifa al-Sajjadiyya al-khamisa (Arabic: الصحيفة الخامسة السجادية) is the longest version of the Sahifa of al-Sajjad has been published.
- Al-Majalis al-saniyya fi manaqib wa-masa'ib al-'itra al-nabawiyya (Arabic: المجالس السنيه في مناقب و مصائب العتره النبويه)
- Iqna' al-la'im ala iqamat al-matam (Arabic: اقناع اللائم علی اقامه المآتم)
- Lawa'ij al-ashjan fi maqtal al-imam Abi Abd Allah al-Husayn (Arabic: لواعج الأشجان في مقتل الإمام إبي عبد الله الحسين ابن علي بن أبي طالب عليه السلام)
- Kashf al-Irtiyab fi Atba' Muhammad b. 'Abd al-Wahhab (Arabic: كشف الإرتياب في أتباع محمد بن عبد الوهاب)

== See also ==
- Islamic scholars
- Islamization of knowledge
- Islamic philosophy
- Ayatollah al-Shirazi
- List of maraji
- Allameh Majlesi
- Hossein Nasr
- Musa al-Sadr

== Sources ==
- Fouad Ajami. The Vanished Imam: Musa Al Sadr and the Shia of Lebanon. Ithaca: Cornell University Press, 1986.
