= Nasibi =

Term used in Islamic scholarship

Naṣibi (Arabic: ناصبي) (plural Arabic: نواصب, romanized: nawāṣib) is a term used in Islamic scholarship to describe a Muslim who is opposed Ali ibn Abi Talib and his family. The word “Nasb” in Arabic means to establish or raise something, and from this comes the word “Nasibat al-Shar” and “al-Harb” (The Settlement of Evil and War). Sunnis and Twelver Shiite writers agree that the Nawāṣib are those who believe that Ali ibn Abi Talib was immoral, but who do not believe that he was an infidel, as the Khawarij did. Some Twelver Shiites however extend the term Nawāṣib to include all their opponents, regardless of whether they believe he was immoral or an infidel.

== Sunni Views on the Nawāṣib ==
Sunnis believe that the Naṣibis are those who harm the Ahl al-Bayt by word or deed, and they were an independent sect that disappeared with time.

- The scholar Abu Ja'far al-Tahawi said: "This is a statement of the creed of the People of the Sunnah and the Community according to the school of thought of the jurists of the religion, Abu Hanifa al-Nu'man ibn Thabit al-Kufi, Abu Yusuf Ya'qub ibn Ibrahim al-Ansari, and Abu Abdullah Muhammad ibn al-Hasan al-Shaybani al-Wa'ili." Then he said: "We affirm the caliphate after the Messenger of God, peace and blessings be upon him, first for Abu Bakr al-Siddiq, in order to give him preference and precedence over the entire ummah, then for 'Umar ibn al-Khattab, then for 'Uthman ibn 'Affan, then for 'Ali ibn Abi Talib, and they are the Rightly-Guided Caliphs and the Rightly-Guided Imams."
- Sheikh Ibn 'Uthaymeen said: "The Nawāṣib are those who are hostile to the Household of the Prophet, slander them, and curse them. They are the opposite of the Sunnah."
- Ibn Taymiyyah said in explaining the creed of the People of the Sunnah and the Community: "They love the Household of the Messenger of Islam, support them, and observe the will of the Messenger of Islam regarding them... They disavow the way of the Rafidis, who hate the Companions and curse them, and the way of the Nawāṣib, who harm the Household of the Prophet in word or deed. The Sunnis and the community refrain from discussing what happened between the Companions (Al-Aqeedah Al-Wasitiyyah, Majmu’ Al-Fatawa 3/154)

The Sunnis view the Naṣibis as a group that is not based upon the truth. However, Sunnis do not consider the Naṣibis to be disbelievers. The reason for this is that Ali ibn Abi Talib was declared a disbeliever by the Kharijites, yet Ali ibn Abi Talib did not, in turn, declare the Kharijites to be disbelievers. Furthermore, it is worth mentioning that the majority of Sunni scholars hold the view that the Kharijites are not disbelievers, while others among them do consider the Kharijites to be disbelievers.

Another Sunni scholar, Abdul Rasheed Nomani authored several treatises in Urdu criticising Naṣibi perspectives in Pakistan, including Yazid ki Shakhsiyyat Ahl-i Sunnat ki Nazar me (Karachi, 1982), Shuhada-i Karbala par Iftira (Karachi, 1988), Akabir-i Sahaba par Buhtan (Karachi, 1988), Naṣibiyyat Tahqiq ke Bahis me (Karachi, 1962), Naṣibi Sazish (Karachi, 1984), and Hazrat-i Ali or Qisas-i Uthman (Karachi, 1998).

== Twelver Shi'a Views on the Nawāṣib ==
=== The meaning of Nasb (Enmity) ===
According to the Shia, Nasb is not an inherent characteristic of a specific group or religious community. Rather, it describes anyone who shows animosity towards the Prophet Muhammad, his household (Ahl al-Bayt), and their descendants from Fatima. Similarly, it manifests as animosity towards their Shia followers, where this animosity is expressed through their persecution, imprisonment, torture, and the desecration of their sacred sites, and not merely disagreement in opinion. Nasb is:

1. Enmity towards the Prophet Muhammad, or his daughter Fatima, or Ali ibn Abi Talib.
2. Enmity towards the Imams from their progeny.
3. Enmity towards their Shia followers.

=== Charging someone with Nasb ===
There are many ways in which the term fraud is used among Shiites. The most prominent opinions are:

- Opinion that the accusation of Nasb cannot be used to describe a person without clear evidence: This is the well-known view in the fatwas of Shia authorities and the famous fatwa of Sistani, which states that the accusation of Nasb cannot be used to describe a person without clear and strong evidence. A Naṣibi must openly display enmity for the label and rulings of a Naṣibi to apply to them. As for a person who shows affection outwardly but harbors animosity inwardly, the rulings of a Naṣibi do not apply to them. Rather, matters are judged by what is apparent and by clear evidence.
- Opinion that whoever gives precedence to anyone other than Ali ibn Abi Talib is a Naṣibi: "Considering that you have already come to know that a Naṣibi is none other than one who gives precedence over Ali." It is well-known that the Sunni Muslims give precedence to Abu Bakr, Umar, and Uthman over Ali ibn Abi Talib.
- Opinion that Sunni Muslims in general are Naṣibis: "Rather, their (the Imams') narrations explicitly state that a Naṣibi is what is referred to among them as a Sunni... and there is no doubt that what is meant by Naṣibis are the Sunni Muslims." Similarly, "The third [issue] is the contradiction of the aforementioned two narrations by necessity after the Naṣibi has been interpreted as absolutely anyone from the common people." The term "common people" (al-ʿĀmmah) is used by the Twelver Shia to refer to the Sunni Muslims.
- Opinion that the Zaydi Shia are Naṣibis: It is narrated from al-Ridha and al-Sadiq that "The Zaydis, the Waqifis, and the Naṣibis are of the same standing in his view." "From Umar ibn Yazid, who said: I asked him (the Imam) about giving charity to Naṣibis and Zaydis? He said: Do not give them anything in charity, and do not give them water to drink if you can avoid it. And he said: The Zaydis are the Naṣibis." "From Umar ibn Yazid, who said: I asked Abu Abdullah (the Imam) about giving charity to a Naṣibi and a Zaydi? He said: Do not give them anything in charity, and do not give them water to drink if you can avoid it. And he said regarding the Zaydis: They are the Naṣibis."

=== Figures in history that Twelver Shiites describe as Nawāṣib ===
- Abu Bakr, Umar, and Uthman: In the early period of Islamic history, the Shia considered anyone who declared enmity towards Ali, whether by action or word, to be a Naṣibi. This designation was applied to the first three caliphs, Abu Bakr al-Siddiq, Umar ibn al-Khattab, and Uthman ibn Affan, as, according to Shia narrations, they usurped Ali's right to the Imamate and usurped the right of his wife Fatima.
- The Companions, except for a few: The Shia consider many of the Prophet's companions to be Naṣibis, as, according to historical narrations, they fought Ali and displayed enmity towards him. Among the most famous of these are the leaders of the Battle of the Camel: Zubayr ibn al-Awam, Talha ibn Ubayd Allah, and Aisha bint Abi Bakr. Also included are Abu Huraira, Anas ibn Malik, and Amr ibn al-As.
- The Umayyad Caliphs: The Shia consider all the Umayyad caliphs (with the exception of Muawiya ibn Yazid and Umar ibn Abd al-Aziz) to be Naṣibis. From the Shia perspective, starting with Muawiya ibn Abi Sufyan, they displayed enmity towards Ali and his descendants by not accepting his caliphate. The Umayyad era witnessed the Battle of Siffin and the Battle of Karbala, in which Hussein ibn Ali and his sons were killed, as well as the order to curse Ali from the pulpits. Additionally, Zayd ibn Ali was killed by order of Hisham ibn Abd al-Malik, and the Shia believe that al-Walid ibn Abd al-Malik ordered the poisoning of Ali Zayn al-Abidin ibn al-Hussein.
- The Abbasid Caliphs: The situation is similar regarding the Abbasid caliphs, who initially allied with the Alids (descendants of Ali) but then monopolized power. Revolutions against Abbasid rule occurred, such as the revolt of Muhammad al-Nafs al-Zakiyya. Some Abbasid caliphs were known for their hatred of Ali and his descendants, such as al-Mutawakkil al-Abbasi. The Shia believe that Ja'far al-Sadiq died by order of Abu Ja'far al-Mansur and that Musa al-Kazim died by order of Harun al-Rashid
- Some Scholars of the People of the Sunnah and the Jama'ah: The Twelver Shia consider some Sunni scholars to be Naṣibis, such as Abu Hanifa, al-Dhahabi, al-Bukhari, Ibn Kathir, and others.
- Other Figures: According to the Shia view, Nasb is attributed to the following historical figures: Abu Bakr, Umar ibn al-Khattab, Uthman ibn Affan, Abu Huraira, Anas ibn Malik, Zubayr ibn al-Awam, Sa'd ibn Abi Waqqas, Muawiya ibn Abi Sufyan, Amr ibn al-As, Aisha bint Abi Bakr, al-Mughira ibn Shu'ba, Malik ibn Anas, Imam al-Bukhari, Ibn Taymiyyah, Ibn Kathir, Ibn Hazm, al-Dhahabi, and Harun al-Rashid.

=== The ruling on those whom the Shiites call Nawaṣib ===
Some Shiites sometimes use the term Naṣibis to describe all Sunnis, claiming that even though they do not oppose Ali and his family, they oppose his “Shiites” according to their point of view. Among the Shiite texts related to the Naṣibis and their ruling are:

- Nimatullah al-Jaza'iri said: "Rather, their narrations, peace be upon them, proclaim that the Naṣibi is what they call a Sunni." Then he said: "There is no dispute that what is meant by Naṣibis are the Sunnis." He said: "This meaning is supported by the fact that the Imams, peace be upon them, and their elite applied the term Naṣibi to Abu Hanifa and his likes, even though he was not among those who harbored enmity against the Household of the Prophet."
- Abu Ja'far al-Tusi said: "On the authority of al-Sadiq: 'Take the wealth of the Naṣibi wherever you find it and give us a fifth of it.'"
- Al-Saduq said: "On the authority of Dawud ibn Farqad, he said: I said to Abu Abdullah: What do you say about killing a Naṣibi? He said: His blood is permissible, but be careful. If you are able to overturn a wall over him or drown him in water so that he cannot testify against you, then do so. I said: What do you think about his wealth? He said: 'Take what you are able to take.'"
