= Sheikh Ibrahim al-Nama'a =

Sheikh Ibrahim al-Nama'a is an Iraqi imam in Mosul. He has been cited as an Islamist who preaches against the presence of American troops in Iraq.
