= Ibrahim al-Haidari =

Iraqi historian

Ibrahim al-Haidari (died after 1860) was an Ottoman historian and anthropologist of the mid-19th century in Ottoman Iraq. He has been cited as "one of the most perspicacious historians of the period". Based in Baghdad, he was the author of a noted regional history of Baghdad, Basra, Kuwait and Najd in 1860, in which he "sought to recreate a regional world, tying southern Iraq to Kuwait, Arabistan/Khuzistan and central Arabia.
