= Jawad Tabrizi =

Iranian Grand Ayatollah (1926–2006)

Grand Ayatollah Mirza Jawad Tabrizi
- شيخ ميرزا جواد تبريزى
- Title: Grand Ayatollah

Personal life
- Born: 1926 Tabriz, Iran
- Died: November 20, 2006 (aged 79–80)
- Resting place: Fatima Masumeh Shrine
- Children: Jafar

Religious life
- Religion: Usuli Twelver Shia Islam

Senior posting
- Based in: Qom, Iran
- Period in office: 1992–2006
- Website: Official website

Grand Ayatollah Sheikh Mirza Jawad Kubar Tabrizi (Persian: جواد كبار تبريزى; 1926 – November 20, 2006) was an Iranian Shia marja'.

Tabrizi was another prominent student of the late grand Ayatollah Sayyid Abu al-Qasim al-Khoei, and one of the leading religious authorities that came to light after the death of al-Khoei.

== Early life and education ==
Tabrizi was born in Tabriz, to Ali Kubar, a merchant, and Fatima Sultan. He claimed descent from Muhammad through his mother.

=== Education ===
He began his academic education in school, and completed his matriculation in Tabriz. However, he did ended up changing his mind, and going to the Islamic seminary. His family were not encouraging, since at that time, the government of Pahlavi dynasty was continuously pressuring the clerical class of the country. However, his family eventually accepted his fact, and Tabrizi began his Islamic education.

He travelled to Qom in 1948, and studied under the thriving seminary under the spiritual guidance of grand Ayatollah Hossein Borujerdi. He studied under Sayyid Muhammad Hujjat Kuh-Kamari for four years, and under Borujerdi for seven years. He was also eventually reaching in Qom, however he decided to move to Najaf, to pursue further education.

He entered Najaf in 1953, and attended the lectures of prominent scholars like Sayyid Muhsin al-Hakim, Sayyid Abd al-Hadi al-Shirazi and Sayyid Abu Al-Qasim al-Khoei. He became a close student of al-Khoei, and was appointed as a member in his fatwa office. He attended al-Khoei's lectures and taught intermediate and advanced courses for just under twenty years. He obtained attained the level of ijtihad and began to specialise in philosophy, Quranic exegesis and rijal. He was a contemporary of classmates, Sayyid Muhammad-Baqir al-Sadr, Sheikh Hossein Wahid Khorasani and Sayyid Ali al-Sistani.

== Return to Iran ==
In 1976, the Baathist regime increased its pressures against Iranians as well as Iraqis of Iranian descent, and began to deport them. Among the deported was Tabrizi. His compulsory exile saddened al-Khoei at the time.

Upon his return to Iran, he settled in Qom, and resumed his religious activities, teaching in its seminary. His classes were significantly influenced by those of Najaf, due to the time Tabrizi spent in Najaf.

== Religious career ==
After the death of al-Khoei in 1992, many followers returned to follow him as their marja'.

=== Napkin of grief ===
Tabrizi was an avid champion for the mourning symbols of the Ahl al-Bayt. He would be seen attending public gatherings, and weeping excessively, as to filling his napkin with tears. To highlight the importance of these mourning rituals, Tabrizi put in his will that his two napkins be buried with him in his grave, so that they may intercede for him on the day of judgement. In part of the will he wrote directed at his students, he said in regards to mourning:

"Do not provide anyone the space to cast doubt and suspicion in the minds of people with the symbols of Imam Husayn. For the preservation of the creed [Jafari madhhab] depends on the preservation of the symbols of Imam Husayn."

=== Fatimah's death ===
Tabrizi believes the attack of Fatimah's house holds a very high religious significance in the Shi'i creed. He would specifically attend mourning gatherings dedicated to Fatimah, and be seen weeping. He led a large mourning procession in Qom, on the anniversary of her death–in accordance to the third narration– annually, that saw hundreds of thousands of people participating in it, and the attendance of other grand Ayatollahs like Hossein Wahid Khorasani. When the controversial marja' Sayyid Muhammad-Husayn Fadhlallah declared his opinion that the attack of the door was a myth, and deemed most stories as fiction, Tabrizi along with Khorasani and Sayyid Muhammad-Sadiq Rohani deemed him a "deviant".

Tabrizi is dubbed nasir al-zahra (Victor of Zahra [Fatimah]) because of his no-compromise policy towards the case of the events that lead to the death of Fatimah.

=== Responses to Europe ===
Tabrizi issued a strong statement condemning the Jyllands-Posten Muhammad cartoons controversy, deeming it an infidelity, and that freedom of speech should not mean the freedom to instigate offense to other races and religions. He also condemned the Islamic scarf controversy in France, especially the suspensions and expulsions of Muslim female students from middle and high schools for wearing the scarf in class, stating that it was rich of these countries to claim to implement democracy, yet restrict personal fundamental religious practices.

== Personal life ==
Tabriza married whilst he was in Najaf and had seven children, four daughters and three sons.

== Death ==
Tabrizi died on Monday, November 20, 2006, due to illness. He was buried in the Fatima Masumeh Shrine, and al-Khorasani led his funeral prayer.

Iran's supreme leader Ali Khamenei, issued a message of condolences in which he characterized Tabrizi as one of the most prominent teachers of the Islamic seminary of Qom.

== Works ==
Tabrizi authored numerous volumes in jurisprudence and principles of jurisprudence. Some of them include:

- Irshad al-Talib Fi Sharh al-Makasib (Guiding the Student in the Explanation of al-Makasib). 7 volumes.
- Tanqeeh Mabani al-Urwa. 7 volumes.
- Kitab al-Qisas (Book of Punishable Sentence)
- Kitab al-Diyaat. (Book of Retaliatory Compensation)
- Tabaqat al-Rijal (Levels of biographical evaluation)
- al-Durus Fi 'Ilm al Usul (Lessons in Principles of Jurisprudence)
- Sirat al-Najat (Path of Salvation)
- Thulumat Fatima al-Zahra (Oppression of Fatimah)
- Fadak
- al-Sha'aer al-Husayniyyah (Symbols of Husayn)
- Ziyarat Ashura Fowq al-Shubahat (Ziyarat Ashura Above Suspicion)

== See also ==
- Hossein Wahid Khorasani
- Mohammad Sadiq Rouhani
- Abu al-Qasim al-Khoei
