= Shamsodin Vaezi =

Iraqi Twelver Shi'a Marja' (born 1936)

Grand Ayatollah Shamsodin Vaezi sabzevari
- Born: 1936; Najaf, Iraq
- Website: http://www.wadhy.com/

Grand Ayatollah Shams al-din al-Waizi al-sabzevari (Arabic: شمس الدين الواعظي السبزواري) was born in 1936 in Kazmein, Iraq, and was the son of Ayatollah Hamed Vaezi and grandson of Sheikh Abdul Qahhar Vaezi. After completing his primary education, he studied seminary sciences in Kazmein and in 1954, he went to Najaf with his brother Nur al-Din Vaezi to continue his education. He went to Heydariyya (Khan al-Nas) on behalf of Sayyid Mohsen Hakim, where he engaged in religious activities and built two Hussainiyya. Vaezi then attended a course in extracurricular jurisprudence and principles and received permission from Fazel Lankarani to conduct ijtihad and narration. He began teaching jurisprudence and principles at the Dar al-Ilm School in Najaf in 1980 and began the second course in principles in 1986. In March 1991, due to the worsening situation in Iraq, he left Iraq with his family and a group of his supporters and went to Iran and settled in Qom. During this time, he continued his research and teaching. Wa'ezi returned to Iraq after about thirteen years after the fall of the Iraqi government. He has also been active in building mosques and Hussainiyahs, helping orphans and the poor, and supporting students.

== Teachers ==
Among his teachers were Fazel Lankarani, Ahmad Amin, Sayyid Hasan al-Haydari, and his father, Hamid al-Wa'izi. After moving to Najaf in 1954, he studied under Mojtaba Lankarani, Kazem al-Tabrizi, and Muhammad al-Sabzevari. He later studied jurisprudence and Islamic law under Abu al-Qasim al-Khoei and Mirza Hasan al-Bojnurdi.

== Works ==
His works include the following books, as well as two manuscripts: Kulliyat fi al-Masail al-Falsafiyya and his notes on Al-Urwa al-Wuthqa:

- Al-Isharat fi Madarik al-Ahkam, a report of his teacher Mirza Hasan al-Bojnurdi's lessons.
- Al-Kashf al-Jali
- Bidayat al-Wusul fi Ilm al-Usul, volume 1
- Risala fi al-Khums
- Risala fi al-Riba
- Risala fi al-Taqiyya
- Al-Isharat ila Asrar al-Basmalah
- Al-Isharat ila al-Tabligh wa al-Muballigh wa al-Muballagh Lahu
- Risala fi Ahkam al-Nisa
- His notes on Minhaj al-Salihin
- Manasik al-Hajj
- Masail fi al-Khums
- Minhaj al-Salihin, his practical treatise for his followers, in two volumes on acts of worship and transactions
- Al-Masail al-Mustahdatha

== See also ==
- List of maraji
