= Mohammad Hussein Fadlallah =

Lebanese cleric (1935–2010)

Sayyed Muhammad Hussein Fadl-Allāh السيد محمد حسين فضل الله
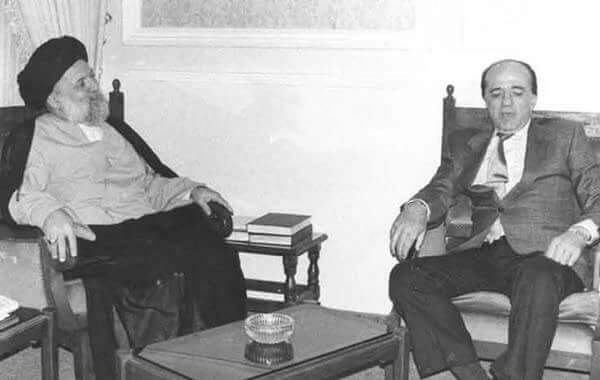
- Fadlallah (left) at a press conference
- Title: Grand Ayatollah

Personal life
- Born: 16 November 1935 Najaf, Kingdom of Iraq
- Died: 4 July 2010 (aged 74) Beirut, Lebanon
- Website: bayynat.org.lb (Arabic, French, English) bayynat.ir (Persian, Urdu)

Religious life
- Religion: Twelver Shi`a Islam

Senior posting
- Based in: Beirut, Lebanon
- Post: Grand Shia cleric
- Period in office: 1989–2010

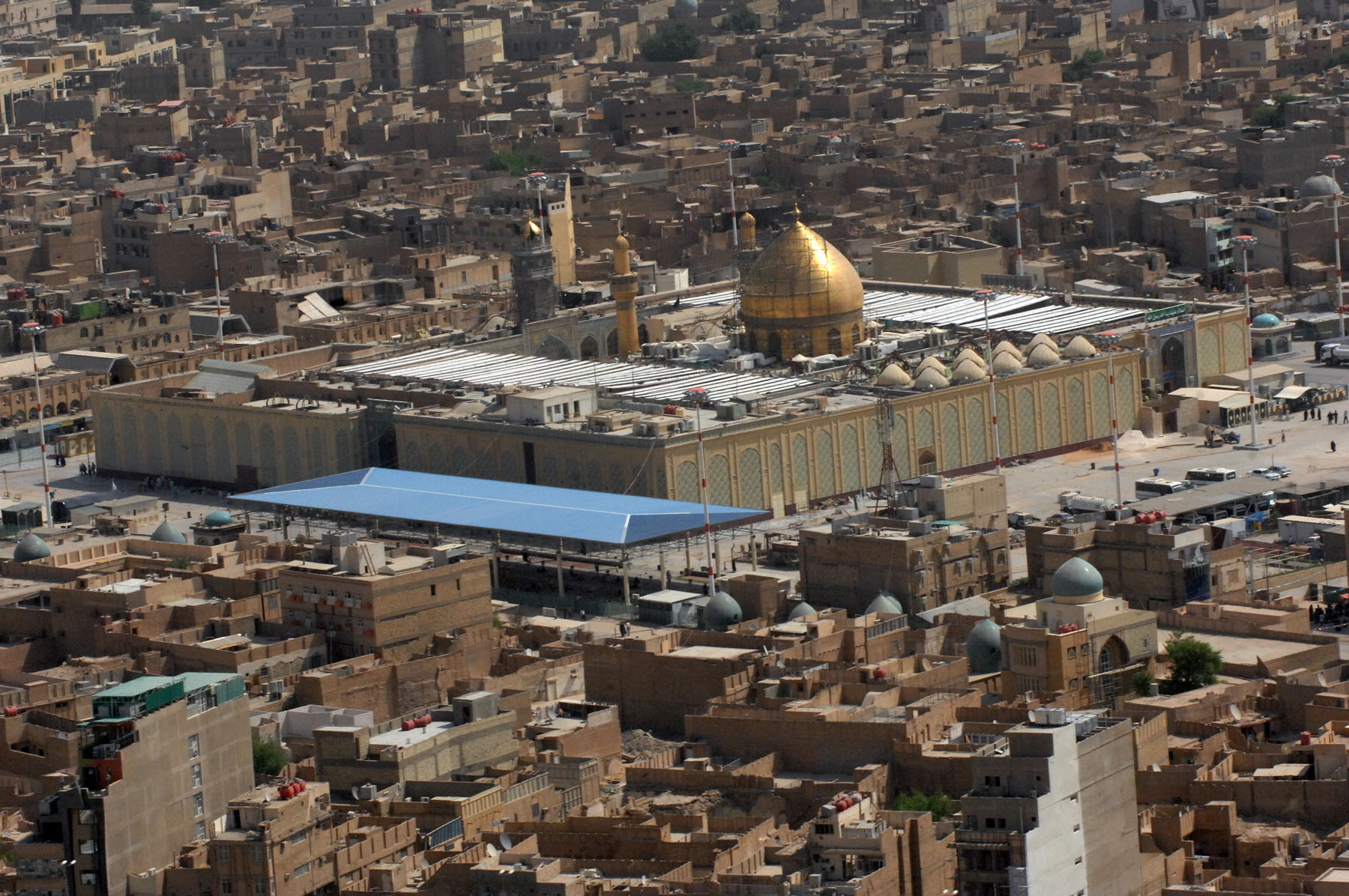
Shrine city of Najaf

Grand Ayatollah Muhammad Husayn Fadlallah (Arabic: محمد حسين فضل الله, romanized: Muḥammad Ḥusayn Fadl Allāh; 16 November 1935 – 4 July 2010) was a prominent Lebanese-Iraqi Twelver Shia cleric. Born in Najaf, Iraq, Fadlallah studied Islam in Najaf before moving to Lebanon in 1952. In the following decades, he gave many lectures, engaged in intense scholarship, wrote dozens of books, founded several Islamic religious schools, and established the Mabarrat Association. Through the aforementioned association, he established a public library, a women's cultural center, and a medical clinic.

Fadlallah was sometimes called the "spiritual mentor" of Hezbollah in the media, and Naim Qassem was a student of his, although his mentorship of Hezbollah was disputed by other sources. He was also the target of several assassination attempts, including the 1985 Beirut car bombing.

His death was followed by a huge turnout in Lebanon, visits by virtually all major political figures across the Lebanese spectrum, and statements of condolence from across the greater Middle East region; but it also led to controversy in the West and a denunciation in Israel.

== Early life ==
Fadlallah was born in the Iraqi Shia shrine city of Najaf on 16 November 1935. His parents, Abdulraouf Fadlullah and al-Hajja Raoufa Hassan Bazzi, had migrated there from the village of 'Aynata in south Lebanon in 1928 to learn theology. By the time of his birth, his father was already a Muslim scholar.

== Education ==
Fadlallah began his education starting with learning the Quran and the alphabet in seminary classes in a Quranic Kuttab School in Najaf, including basic skills of writing and reading. He later on began in an Islamic School in Najaf called Muntada al-Nashir which was recently formed at that time.

Poetry gave great inspiration to Fadlallah from magazines such as al-Katib published in Egypt and already from a teenager, he began to write poetry himself. He also showed critical views towards the occupation of Palestine in 1947 by publishing a poem for the public by the age of 12. By that time, he had begun his religious studies in a Hawza school. However, the Hawza school in Najaf focused exclusively on legal studies and his poetry was not well received. This did not stop him from continuing writing poetry and Najaf had a guiding school for poets called Muntada al-Nashir which he joined later on. He also got support from his uncle who was also a poet himself and meant that poetry was important to achieve greater understanding of Islam.

== Return to Lebanon ==
After 21 years of studying under the prominent teachers of the Najaf religious university he concluded his studies in 1966 and returned to Lebanon. He had already visited Lebanon in 1952 where he recited a poem eulogizing Muhsin al Amin at his funeral.

In 1966 Fadlallah received an invitation from a group who had established a society called "The family of Fraternity" (جمعية أسرة التآخي Jam'iyat Usrat at-Ta'akhi) to come and live with them in the area of Naba'a in Eastern Beirut. He agreed, especially as the conditions at Najaf impelled him to leave.

In Naba'a, Fadlallah began his work by organising cultural seminars and delivering religious speeches that discussed social issues as well. These social issues encompassed improving education and expertise among the population in Lebanon. Fadlallah was quoted as saying, "We have to improve our education and gain more scientific knowledge. If we do not make the best of our time now, we will not be able to build our future or develop in the future." In addition to the academic work that Fadlallah did, he also opened up schools like the Imam Ali Bin Abi Talib school in South Lebanon, Islamic centres like the large Islamic Center in Beirut, and orphanages like the Imam Al-Khoei Orphanage in Beirut.

His political activism thus mainly concerned improving education, healthcare and social services in Lebanon. During the Lebanese Civil War nevertheless, Fadlallah and his political activism was at its peak. His views then were against Western powers such as Israel and the United States, but also conservative Arab regimes, especially against the monarchy of Saudi Arabia, that allegedly tried to murder him while also killing several innocent people.

== Fadlallah and Hezbollah ==
Many scholars and media in the Western and Arab world argued that Fadlallah was part of Hizbollah as they meant that the organization was heavily inspired by his ideas and guidance when they emerged and developed as a group. However, Fadlallah was never part of a political organization or any public religious institutions as he was 'above' politics. Hizbollah has also rejected this statement, claiming that Ayatollah Khomeini was their source of spiritual and political guidance, especially with regards to their resistance against injustice and occupation from Western powers. Fadlallah even chose to separate himself from the Iranian revolution, however he had a similar anti-west stance.

Some scholars, on the other hand, argue that Fadlallah had a clear relationship with Hizbullah. His ideas were inspired by religious thought but developed as a response to social and political struggles in the society, and he believed in empowering Islamist movements. His thought and guidance were connected to religious and political activism directed at fulfilling aims of Islam, and Hizbollah was central in the political field in Lebanon. Furthermore, Hizbollah's Secretary-General, Naim Qassem, has mentioned that Hizbollah was initially composed of fractions of different Islamic movements inspired by Fadlallah and his vision for the future.

== Assassination attempts ==
As one of the alleged leaders of Hezbollah, a status both he and the group denied he was the target of several assassination attempts, including the allegedly CIA-sponsored and funded 8 March 1985 Beirut car bombing that killed 80 people.

On 8 March 1985, a car bomb equivalent to 440 lb (200 kg) of dynamite exploded 9–45 metres from his house in Beirut, Lebanon. The blast destroyed a 7-story apartment building and a cinema, killed 80 people and wounded 256. The attack was timed to go off as worshippers were leaving Friday Prayers. Most of the dead were girls and women who had been leaving the mosque, though the ferocity of the blast "burned babies in their beds," "killed a bride buying her trousseau," and "blew away three children as they walked home from the mosque." It also "devastated the main street of the densely populated" West Beirut suburb. but Fadlallah escaped injury. Journalist Robin Wright quotes articles in The Washington Post and The New York Times as saying that according to the CIA, those responsible for the bombing were "Lebanese intelligence personnel and other foreigners" who had been "undergoing CIA training" but that "this was not our [CIA] operation and it was nothing we planned or knew about." "Alarmed U.S. officials subsequently canceled the covert training operation" in Lebanon, according to Wright. According to Bob Woodward, CIA director William Casey was involved in the attack, which he suggests was carried out with funding from Saudi Arabia. "In his book Woodward portrays Casey as a wily and aggressive director who made the CIA his personal instrument of foreign policy. In early 1985 Woodward reports, Casey went "off the books" to enlist Saudi help in carrying out three covert operations. One was the attempted assassination of Sheik Fadlallah, who had been linked to the bombings in Beirut. After that plot failed, Woodward writes, the Saudis offered Fadlallah a $2 million bribe to cease his terrorist attacks. He accepted, and the attacks stopped. Woodward's account of the incident was denied last week by the Saudi press agency and by Fadlallah's office." Former Lebanese warlord and statesman late Elie Hobeika was accused as one of those likely responsible for the actual operation.

During the 2006 Lebanon War, Israeli warplanes bombed his two-story house in Beirut's southern Haret Hreik neighborhood. Fadlallah was not at home at the time of the bombing, which reduced the house to rubble.

== Views ==
Fadlallah supported the Iranian Islamic Revolution in the beginning and criticized US and Israel for their policies in the Middle East which he often mentioned in his prayer sermons. In 1995 the US branded him as a terrorist and got therefore blacklisted. His views towards the Iranian revolution and the cleric changed over the years as his ideological standpoint became more moderate compared to the clerics in Iran.

=== U.S. foreign policy ===
Due to US and their continuous support for Israel, Fadlallah called on countries in Middle East to boycott Israeli and American products and replace these products with European and Asian goods.

In November 2007, Fadlallah accused the United States of trying to sabotage the election in Lebanon: "The insanity of the U.S. president and its administration is reflected in Lebanon by their ambassador pressuring the Lebanese people and preventing them from reaching an agreement over the presidential election."

Though he welcomed the election of Barack Obama as the American president, the following year he expressed disappointment with Obama's lack of progress in the Middle East peace process saying he appeared to have no plan to bring peace to the region. Despite his criticism of U.S. foreign policy in the Middle East, he condemned the September 11 attacks in the United States as acts of terrorism.

=== Israel ===
Fadlallah made statements in favour of suicide bombings against Israeli citizens. In a 2002 interview with The Daily Telegraph, he said:

I was not the one who launched the idea of so-called suicide bombings...but I have certainly argued in favour of them. I do, though, make a distinction between them and attacks that target people in a state of peace - which was why I opposed what happened on September 11.

The situation of the Palestinians is quite different, because they are in a state of war with Israel. They are not aiming to kill civilians but, in war, civilians do get killed. Don't forget, the Palestinians are living under mountains of pressure.

They have had their land stolen, their families killed, their homes destroyed, and the Israelis are using weapons, such as the F16 aircraft, which are meant only for major wars. There is no other way for the Palestinians to push back those mountains, apart from martyrdom operations.

His support for suicide bombings against Israel were based on the grounds that the latter uses advanced weaponry; it was also claimed that he wished that the state of Israel would cease to exist due to its occupation of Palestinian lands. Following the Mercaz HaRav attack, Fadlallah called the attack "heroic." Western sources also cite his favour for suicide bombings against Israeli citizens. Fadlallah explained the religious basis for suicide attacks in an interview with Daily Star.

In September 2009, Fadlallah issued a fatwa banning normalisation of ties with Israel. He also objected to any territorial settlement, saying "the entire land of Palestine within its historical borders is one Arab-Islamic country and no one has right to spare on[e] inch of it."

Fadlallah was often criticised for his attitude towards Israel and suicide attacks or martyrdom. He stated that if you get attacked you should be allowed to defend yourself in all possible ways. If suicide attacks are the last instance of self-defence, in Fadlallah's view this is justified even though they are directed against the civilian population.

For Fadlallah, Israel is the aggressor against whom one may defend oneself in any way due to Israel's strong superiority. Fadlalla argues that the West acts similarly and that the bombing of Hiroshima and Nagasaki is an example of how desperation justifies the use of weapons that are usually not considered normal in warfare.

=== Islamic governance ===
Despite his ties with the Islamic Republic of Iran, Fadlallah distanced himself from the Ayatollah Khomeini's legacy of Veleyat-e Faqih as theocratic rule by Islamic clerics who said that "no Shia religious leader, not even Khomeini... has a monopoly on the truth." He also first endorsed Grand Ayatollah Ali al-Sistani rather than Ayatollah Ali Khamenei as the marja for Shia in matters of religion, before claiming the role for himself. In a 2009 interview, Fadlallah said that he did not believe wilayat al-faqih as a form of theocracy, has a role in modern Lebanon.

=== Fighting deviancy ===
Fadlallah took a stern stand against what he considered deviation from Islam.

Islam is a religion that challenges oppression and deviation. It did not abandon its basic spiritual and moral principle when it made legal jihad, sanctioned war, and encouraged force to confront atheism and chaos. For that reason, the legality of suppressing deviation in the world opens the door to the legality of executing the deviates, if that leads to nullifying the deviation."

=== Women ===
Fadlallah was known for his relatively liberal views on women, whom he saw as equal to men. He believed that women have just as much of a responsibility towards society as men do, and women should be role models for both men and women. Fadlallah also believed that women have the same exact ability as men to fight their inner weaknesses. He saw the hijab as something that makes a man see a woman not as a sex object, but instead as a human being. He believes, like all of his peers in the Islamic seminary that women should cover their entire body except for their face and hands, and that they should avoid wearing excessive makeup when they go out in public.

Fadlallah also issued a fatwa on the International Day for the Elimination of Violence against Women that supports the right of a woman to defend herself against any act of violence whether social or physical. The fatwa reaffirms the rights of women, both at their workplace and at home, and states that Islam forbids men from exercising any form of violence against women and forbids men from depriving women of their legal rights. In his words "physical violence in which women are beaten, proves that these men are weak, for only the weak are in need of unjust violence". He also issued fatwas forbidding female circumcision and honour killings. Regarding abortion, he was opposed to it in most cases; however, when the women is in an abnormal amount of danger by the pregnancy, he believed it was permissible.

== Controversial views regarding Islamic doctrine ==
Fadlallah held controversial views regarding Islamic doctrine, as espoused in some of his works and speeches.

He also issued many fatwas and opinions that courted controversy, for which he was condemned and not supported by other eminent Islamic scholars. This including a representative of Grand Ayatollah al-Sistani, the office of Grand Ayatollah Mirza Jawad Tabrizi, in the holy city of Qom, released a statement that "“We desire to inform Momin brothers that Grand Ayatullah Sheikh Mirza Jawad Tabrezi considered this man ‘Dhaal Modhil’ (who go astray) till the last days of his life because of this man’s deviation from beliefs of Madhhabi Haqqa,” and "any help to or cooperation with him in publishing his writings is not legal with respect to Islam". He was also condemned by Grand Ayatollahs Bashir al-Najafi, Hossein Waheed Khorasani, Mohammad al-Husayni al-Shirazi and Sadiq Hussaini Shirazi. Ishaq al-Fayadh publicly declared his views as legitimate.

== Death ==
Fadallah had suffered from severe illness weeks before his death and got eventually hospitalized due to internal bleeding that had lasted for days. He was 74 years old and died on 4 July in Beirut. After his death was announced, many people gathered to show support and sorrow at the al-Hassanayn mosque.

At his funeral, his supporters carried his body around Shia neighbourhoods in southern Beirut, then marched to the spot of his 1985 assassination attempt before returning to Imam Rida Mosque, where he was laid to rest. Thousands of mourners gathered at the mosque for prayer services before the funeral procession. Delegations included representatives from Kuwait, Bahrain, Qatar, Syria and Iran. The Spokesman of Hezbollah, Ibrahim Mousawi, also came with a statement after his death saying "We're talking about a great loss actually, not just to Hezbollah but to the Islamic Community, and to the Arab World. He has always spread the message of tolerance, of openness, of transparency and of dialogue".

The Lebanese Communication Group, Al-Manar, came with a statement sharing Fadlallah's core views and said his followers "launched a school of beliefs and thoughts, a school that would always be committed to the main causes of Islam, from Jihad to Resistance, and face all foreign threats against the region." It claimed that Fadlallah "committed to the central cause, Palestine, calling to fight occupation through all possible means. His eminence issued different 'fatwa's calling to fight Israel and boycott American goods and ban normalizing of relations, and was a 'true supporter' of Islamic unity all over his life. In his last moments before his death, Sayyed Fadlullah was still preoccupied with the cause. He was asking about the dawn prayers and telling his nurse that he wouldn't rest before Israel's vanishing."

=== Reactions ===
- Prime Minister of Lebanon Saad Hariri, called him "a voice of moderation and an advocate of unity" for the Lebanese people. Hezbollah declared three days of mourning and Secretary General Hassan Nasrallah vowed to stay faithful to the "sacred goals" he had "sacrificed his life to achieve." He added that "we have lost a compassionate father, a wise guide, a fortified shelter, and a strong support that was present at all stages."
- (Bahrain) King Hamad bin Isa Al Khalifa also sent his to Fadlallah's family expressing his sincere condolences to the family, and prayed for the Fadlallah's soul to rest in eternal peace. He also praised Fadlullah's scientific and religious contributions in the service of Islam and Muslims.
- In Iraq, Ali al-Adeeb, a senior member of the Dawa party, called his death a major loss to the Islamic world adding that: "It will be hard to replace him". In Fadlallah's birthplace, however, his death was met with a chilly reception without banners or open displays of mourning as clergy in Najaf expressed discomfort over his legacy and liberal values.
- The Supreme Leader of Iran Ali Khamenei cabled his condolences to Fadlullah's family and his supporters saying "This great intellectual and Mujahid had a huge impact and influence in the political and religious scenes in Lebanon. We won't forget his numerous favors and blessings throughout the years."
- (Kuwait) Emir Sabah Al-Ahmad Al-Jaber Al-Sabah also sent his condolences to the family of Fadlallah saying he prayed to Almighty Allah to have mercy on the soul of the deceased. He also sent a similar cable to the family of Fadlullah.
- (Palestine) President Mahmoud Abbas sent his condolences to his Lebanese counterpart. The head of Hamas' Political Bureau, Khaled Meshaal, sent a letter to Fadlallah's son lamenting the loss of his father. "The dear deceased was one of the nation's special and great figures, with his knowledge, grace, moderation, mediation, forgiveness and openness to others, in addition to his courageous stances regarding the nation's issues, especially towards the Palestinian issue and the Arab-Zionist struggle. His eminence was one of the greatest symbols and scholars defending the choice of resistance and Jihad against the occupation, in support of the Palestinian strife and our people's right to freedom, liberty and liberation." A Hamas delegation from Gaza headed by Marwan Abu Ras was also present at the funerary services.
- Emir Hamad bin Khalifa Al Thani offered condolences to the Lebanese people on behalf of Qatar, its Emir, government and people. Upon arrival in Beirut, al-Thani praised the "commendable attributes of Fadlallah and his relentless efforts in seeking rapprochement and conciliation among various Muslim sects."
- (Turkey) Prime Minister Recep Tayyip Erdogan called Hezbollah leader Hassan Nasrallah to offer his condolences and asked to relay them to Fadlallah's family and the Lebanese people. Nasrallah responded in appreciation and for Erdogan's stance on the Palestinian issue.
- (United Kingdom) The British ambassador to Lebanon, Frances Guy, also wrote: "I remember well, when I was nominated ambassador to Beirut, a Muslim acquaintance sought me out to tell me how lucky I was because I would get a chance to meet Sayyed Mohamad Hussein Fadlullah. Truly he was right...I usually avoid answering by referring to those I enjoy meeting the most and those that impress me the most."
- (Yemen) President Ali Abdullah Saleh also sent his condolences to his Lebanese counterpart.
- CNN's Lebanese senior editor of Middle East affairs Octavia Nasr was fired after a tweet saying she was "Sad to hear of the passing of Sayyed Mohammed Hussein Fadlallah...One of Hezbollah's giants I respect[ed] a lot." Hezbollah condemned her dismissal. Robert Fisk criticised CNN for the firing saying "Poor old CNN goes on getting more cowardly by the hour. That's why no one cares about it any more."

== See also ==
- Ayatollah Mohammed Baqir al-Hakim, maternal cousin of Ayatollah Mohammad Hussein Fadlallah.
- Pope Shenouda III of Alexandria

== Sources ==
Kramer, Martin (1997), "The Oracle of Hizbullah: Sayyid Muhammad Husayn Fadlallah". Full Text with footnotes published in Appleby, R. Scott, Spokesmen for the Despised: Fundamentalist Leaders in the Middle East, pp. 83–181, Chicago, University of Chicago Press (1997), ISBN 978-0-226-02125-6

Ranstorp, Magnus, Hizb'Allah in Lebanon - The Politics of the Western Hostage Crisis, Palgrave Macmillan,1997
