= Hossein Wahid Khorasani =

Iranian Grand Ayatollah (1921–2026)

Grand Ayatollah Sheikh Hossein Wahid Khorasani
- حسین وحید خراسانی
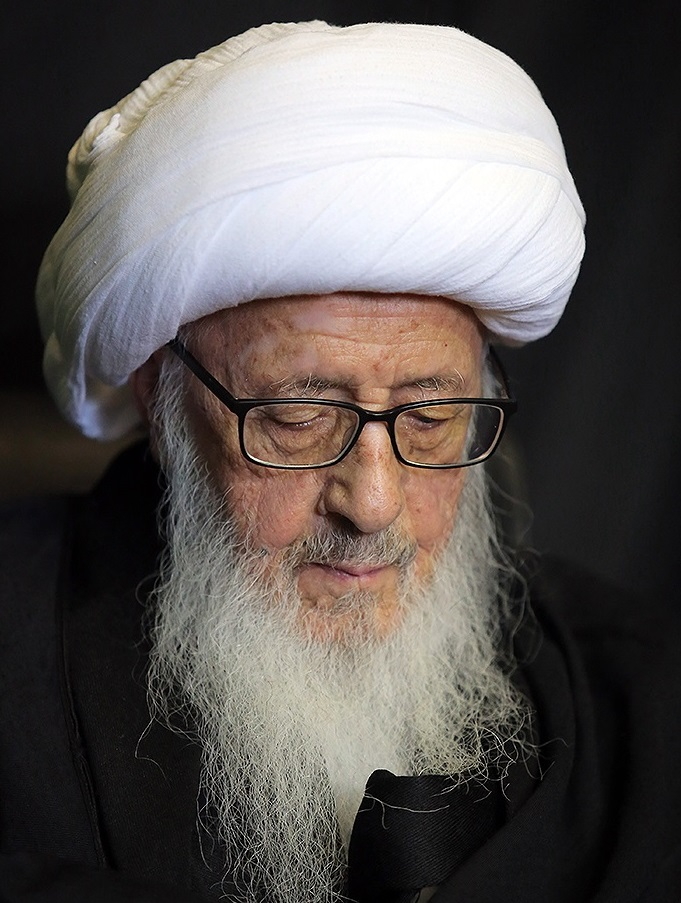
- Wahid Khorasani in 2017
- Title: Grand Ayatollah

Personal life
- Born: Mohammad-Hossein Molla-Saleh; 1 January 1921 Nishapur, Sublime State of Iran
- Died: 17 November 2026 (aged 105) Qom, Iran
- Children: 3
- Relatives: Sadeq Larijani (son-in-law)
- Website: wahidkhorasani.com

Senior posting
- Based in: Qom, Iran
- Post: Chancellor of Qom Seminary
- Period in office: 1972–2024

Religious life
- Religion: Islam
- Denomination: Shia
- Sect: Twelver
- Jurisprudence: Jafari (Usuli)

Hossein Wahid Khorasani (Persian: حسین وحید خراسانی; born Mohammad-Hossein Molla-Saleh (Persian: محمدحسین ملاصالح); 1 January 1921 – 17 November 2026) was an Iranian author and Shia marja'.

Wahid Khorasani was the head of the Qom Seminary from 1972 to 2024. Prior to his death, he was considered to be the most learned living Shia religious authority by a number of scholars.

== Early life and education ==
Mohammad-Hossein Molla-Saleh was born in Nishapur, a city 130 km west of Mashhad, on 1 January 1921. He began using the name Hossein Wahid Khorasani later in life. His father, Sheikh Esmail Khorasani, was a revered alim and orator.

He began his religious education at an early age in Mashhad, completing his muqadamat and Arabic under Sheikh Shams and al-Muhaqiq al-Mughani in the Ba'in Ya school. He then moved to the Mirza Jafar school and completed his intermediate level studies under Sheikh Husayn Birsi, Mirza Ahmed Kifaei, Abu al-Qasim al-Hakim al-Ilahi and Sheikh Husayn-Ali al-Isfahani. He also attended the classes of Mirza Mehdi al-Isfahani, Sheikh Mahdi al-Ishtiyani and Sheikh Muhammad Nahawndi. He received an ijaza from his teacher Sayyid Muhammad Hujjat Kuh-Kamari.

Wahid Khorasani moved to Najaf in 1949 and studied in the Yazdi school for ten years. He attended the classes of Sheikh Muhammad-Husayn Naini for a year; Abu al-Hasan al-Isfahani for two years; Sheikh Musa Khonsari for six years; Agha Dhiya al-Din al-Iraqi, Sayyid Jamal al-Din al-Golpayegani, Sheikh Kadhim al-Shirazi, Sayyid Abd al-Hadi al-Shirazi and Sayyid Muhsin al-Hakim. He studied under Sayyid Abu al-Qasim al-Khoei for his longest educational duartion, which was twelve years, becoming one of the distinguished students of al-Khoei.

He returned to Mashhad in 1972, and taught there for just under a year, and then travelled to Qom, to settle there.

== Fatimah's death ==
Wahid Khorasani believed the attack on Fatimah's house holds a very high religious significance in the Shi'i creed. He led a large mourning procession in Qom, on the anniversary of her death–in accordance to the third narration– annually, that sees hundreds of thousands of people participating in it.

When the reformist marja' Mohammad Hussein Fadlallah declared his opinion that the attack of the door was unreliable, and deemed most stories as weak, Khorasani along with Mirza Jawad Tabrizi and Sayyid Mohammad Sadeq Rouhani deemed him a "deviant".

== Islamic Republic ==
Wahid Khorasani's stance on Iran's government was relatively vague, and he was considered – if anything – an indirect critic. He was often quoted from his lectures as challenging the opinion of Ali Khamenei the Former Supreme Leader of Iran.

== Works ==
Wahid Khorasani authored many books some of which have been translated into Urdu, Persian, Arabic, English, and other languages.

Some of his works include:

- Khorasani, Sheikh Husain Waheed; Publication, Yasin (16 December 2014). Islamic Laws. ISBN 9781505606799.
- Principles of Faith. ISBN 9781546921721.
- Sharh al-Urwatul Wuthqa (Explanation of The Firmest Bond).
- Laws of Hajj.
- Khorasani, Grand Ayatollah Wahid (24 July 2014). On the Occasion of the Great Sorrow, the Martyrdom of Sadiqah Kubra Fatima (Sa). ISBN 9781500634032.
- Khorasani, Grand Ayatollah Waheed (5 May 2014). The Prophet's Fragrant Flower, Imam Hassan Al-Mujtaba. ISBN 9781499365252.
- Khorasani, Grand Ayatullah Waheed (3 April 2014). In Memory of the Last Ruler of God. ISBN 9781497549807.
- Rulings of Medicine.
- Ahkam-e-Shabab (Laws for Youth).
- Misbah al-Huda Wa Safinat al-Najat (Light of Guidance and Ark of Salvation). Two Volumes.

== Personal life and death ==
Wahid Khorasani was married and had two sons.

He was the father-in-law of Sadeq Larijani.

In 2023, Ali Khamenei the Supreme Leader of Iran offered his condolences to Wahid Khorasani upon the death of his wife.

Wahid Khorasani died at a hospital in Qom, in the early hours of 17 November 2026, following a two-week illness that required hospitalisation. He was 105. Khorasani was the oldest marja' and also the longest-living marja' at the time of his death.

On November 18, 2026, the funeral procession of Wahid Khorasani was held in Qom, with the presence of Sadegh Larijani, Chairman of the Expediency Discernment Council, Minister of Culture and Islamic Guidance, representing the government, clergy, people, and his students. His body was carried around the Shrine of Hazrat Masoumeh. Ayatollah Kifaei also prayed over his body. According to the announced schedule, Khorasani's body will be transferred to Mashhad to be buried next to the Imam Reza shrine after the funeral procession.
