= Al-Modarresi family =

Iraqi-Iranian Shia clerical family

House of al-Modarresi آل المدرسي Modarresis
- Founded: 1875; 151 years ago
- Founder: Muhammad-Jawad al-Modarresi
- Current head: Muhammad-Taqi al-Modarresi

The family of al-Modarresi (Arabic: آل المدرسي, romanized: ʾĀl al-Mudarrisī), also transliterated in a number of other ways, including al-Moderrissi or al-Mudarrisi are an Iraqi-Iranian Shia clerical family that settled in Najaf, then Karbala, from Mashhad, in the early 20th century. The family claims agnatic descent from Muhammad's daughter Fatimah, through her great-grandson, Zayd, carrying the honorific title of Sayyid.

The family rose to great prominence in Iraq and later Australia. Some of its members are founders of a number of Shi'ite seminaries in the Middle East and Australia.

== History ==
The al-Modarresi family is a religious intellectual family, that branched off the renowned cleric, Muhammad-Baqir Golpayegani (known as mujtahid jorfadiqani; 1815–1897). He was born in Golpayegan to Agha Mir Muhammad-Ali Golpayegani (1788–1875), a contemporary of Murtadha al-Ansari, who moved to Tehran on the orders of Shihab al-Molk, and died there, and was buried in the Golshan Hammam mosque. Golpayegani travelled to Iraq to study in the religious seminaries of Karbala, Najaf, and finally Samarra, becoming a disciple of Mirza Shirazi. After the death of the Mirza, he moved back to Iran, and became one of the most prominent scholars of Mashhad, even receiving custodianship of the Imam Reza shrine for a while, and died there and was buried in the shrine.

Golpayegani only had a son, and a daughter. His son, Muhammad-Jawad, later adopted the epithet, al-mudarris (the teacher) for being a prominent teacher at the seminary of Mashhad, and became Muhammad-Jawad al-Modarresi. He left Iran for Iraq in 1936, after the Kashf-e Hijab decree, and died there and was buried in the Wadi al-Salam cemetery, near the tombs of Prophets' Hud and Salih. Some of his children remained in Iraq, and others moved back to Iran. His son, Muhammad-Kadhim al-Modarresi settled in Karbala, and later married the daughter of the highest ranking cleric in Karbala, Mirza Mahdi al-Shirazi, which solidified his position among the senior clerics in the city.

The family has an ethnic Arab background. Their great ancestor was imamzadeh Muhammad al-Mahrooq, the great-grandson of the fourth Shia Imam, Ali ibn al-Husayn.

== Contemporary history ==
=== During the Iraqi Baathist era ===
Like other clerical families, the al-Modarresi family struggled under Baathist Iraq. In 1967, Muhammad-Taqi al-Modarresi established a religious activist group, known as the Risali Movement (Arabic: الحركة الرسالية) under the jurisprudential guidance of his maternal uncle, Muhammad al-Shirazi. Before the Iranian revolution, the group remained a secret organisation, working on raising religious awareness in the Middle Eastern region.

By 1971, after facing numerous accounts of harassment by the government, the Modarresis migrated to Kuwait. They settled there until 1979, after which they moved to Iran after the Islamic Revolution.

=== Under the Islamic republic ===
After the family moved to the newly found Islamic Republic of Iran, Muhammad-Taqi went public with his transnational risali movement. He was calling for Islamism in the region, with different aliases across various countries. In Iraq, it was established as the Islamic Action Organization; in Saudi Arabia, it was known as the Islamic Revolution of the Arabian Peninsula; in Bahrain, it was known as the Islamic Front for the Liberation of Bahrain and headed by his brother Hadi. But all these groups were identified as the risalis in the Islamic world.

The Modarresis gained a lot of influence in Iran in the early eighties, and even established a seminary in Tehran, known as the Hawza of al-Qa'im. They were involved in running a number of factions in the Islamic republic, and were close to its leadership. There has been much speculation as to whether Muhammad-Taqi was in fact the head of the Islamic Revolutionary Guard Corps, however he has publicly denied this.

However, during the second half of the 1980s, the Modarresis influence began to wane as more moderate clerics like Ali Khamenei and Akbar Hashemi Rafsanjani came to the fore. As Khamenei and Rafsanjani sought to develop better relations with Persian Gulf Arab states, the Modarresis were marginalised. In 1990, the seminary was also closed down.

=== After the fall of the Baath ===
After the US invasion of Iraq, Muhammad-Taqi returned to Iraq from Iran. On his return to Iraq on April 22, 2003, Muhammad-Taqi was arrested along with his entourage by US military personnel. He was released after being brought to an undisclosed location. The Islamic Action Organization became a political party with al-Modaressi as its leader. The party contested the Iraq 2005 general election as was part of the National Iraqi Alliance of Shia Islamist parties. In 2006, the Islamic Action Organization had one minister in government, State Minister for Civil Society Affairs, Adil al-Asadi.

Muhammad-Taqi currently resides in Iraq, and is the leading grand Ayatollah in Karbala. His only other sibling that also resides in Karbala is Abbas, and all the others remain between Qom, Mashhad, and Australia. The grandchildren of Muhammad-Kadhim al-Modarresi are spread between East and West, occupied with studying and teaching religious studies as clerics of the faith. They also run a religious satellite channel that is Ahlulbayt TV.

== Notable Members ==
=== First Generation ===
- Muhammad-Jawad al-Modarresi was the son of Muhammad-Baqir al-Golpayegani. He was an alim, and prominent teacher at the seminary of Mashhad. His popularity caused him to be known as al-mudarris (the teacher), later being his epithet.

=== Second Generation ===
- Muhammad-Ali al-Modarresi was the son of Muhammad-Jawad al-Modarresi. He was an alim, teacher, and servant at the Imam Reza shrine.
- Muhammad-Kadhim al-Modarresi (1921–1994) was the son of Muhammad-Jawad al-Modarresi. He was an alim, mystic, and prominent teacher at the seminaries of Mashhad and Karbala, teaching Islamic philosophy. He held the Quranic exegesis chair of the Karbala seminary and taught aqaed in the al-Hindiya and al-Badkubeh schools.

=== Third Generation ===
- Muhammad-Ridha al-Modarresi (1931–1980) was the son of Muhammad-Ali al-Modarresi. He was an alim, and socialite, serving as the imam of the Mihrabkhan mosque in Mashhad. He died due to a vehicle accident in Quchan.
- Muhammad-Taqi al-Modarresi (born 1945) is the son of Muhammad-Kadhim al-Modarresi. He is a marja', and the leading cleric in Karbala. He is also the founder of the Islamic Action Organization, a Shia Muslim political party in Iraq.
- Hadi al-Modarresi (born 1948) is the son of Muhammad-Kadhim al-Modarresi. He is an alim, and activist. He led the 1981 Bahraini coup, and later became a founding member of the Supreme Council for the Islamic Revolution in Iraq (SCIRI), and was among the active figures of the Iraqi opposition in exile. He was closely involved in efforts to expose and bring down the Baathist regime in Iraq.
- Abbas al-Modarresi (born 1954) is the son of Muhammad-Kadhim al-Modarresi. He is an alim, and poet. In 1984, he issued a religious studies magazine called al-Basa'er, which was considered a first of its kind in the Shia world. By 1993, he also issued the Ahlulbayt monthly magazine. He established an Islamic seminary in Karbala. After the fall of the Baathist party in 2003, he established a religious seminary in Karbala.
- Ali-Akbar al-Modarresi (born 1957) is the son of Muhammad-Kadhim al-Modarresi. Like his father, and grandfather, he focused on teaching in the religious seminaries, and is considered to be the mentor for many renowned clerical personalities such as Nimr al-Nimr, Rasheed al-Husayni, and others.
- Ali-Asghar al-Modarresi (born 1960) is the son of Muhammad-Kadhim al-Modarresi. He is an alim, and orator. He is also a religious leader in New South Wales, and the founder of the Imam Ali College of NSW.

=== Fourth Generation ===
- Mahdi al-Modarresi (born 1977) is the son of Hadi al-Modarresi. He is a scholar and orator. He has led prayers at the United States House of Representatives, and delivers lectures around the world. He is an expert in interfaith relations, he leads Interpath, a unique outreach program designed to strengthen ties between Muslims and other major faith traditions.
- Mustafa al-Modarressi is the son of Hadi al-Modarresi. he is a scholar and orator.
- Murtadha al-Modarresi is the son of Muhammad-Taqi al-Modarresi, he is a scholar, orator and teacher. He teaches at the Imam al-Muntathar Hawza, established by his father's office in Karbala.
- Muhsin al-Modarresi (born 1988) is the son of Muhammad-Taqi al-Modarresi, he is a scholar, orator and author. He has completed a master's degree in civil engineering, and is mostly involved with youth development, and assists his father in his official work.

== See also ==
- Al-Qazwini family
- Al-Shahrestani family
