= Ali al-Sabziwari =

Iraqi Ayatollah

Ayatollah Sayyid Ali al-Sabziwari
- السيد علي الموسوي السبزواري

Personal life
- Born: 1948 (age 77–78) Najaf, Iraq
- Children: Mohsen al-Sabziwari (son)
- Parent: Abd al-A'la al-Sabziwari (father)
- Relatives: Mohammed Kadhim al-Modarresi (maternal uncle)

Religious life
- Religion: Islam
- Sect: Shia; Twelver

Ayatollah Sayyid Ali al-Musawi al-Sabziwari (Arabic: علي الموسوي السبزواري; Persian: على موسوى سبزواراى; b. 1948) is an Iraqi Shia scholar, and the son of Grand Ayatollah Abd al-A'la al-Sabziwari.

Al-Sabziwari is a teacher at the al-Sabziwari Mosque in Najaf, and a representative of his late father's marja'iya.

== Early life and education ==
Al-Sabziwari was born to Sayyid Abd al-A'la al-Sabziwari, and the daughter of Sayyid Muhammad-Jawad al-Modarresi. He is the second of three sons, and comes from a respectable religious family. His family claim descent from the seventh Shia Imam, Musa ibn Jafar.

=== Education ===
He began his religious education at a young age. He completed his studies and reached the level of ijtihad in the seventies. His sotooh 'ulya (intermediary-advanced studies) classes were considered of the most importance in Najaf, in the nineties.

== Works ==
Al-Sabziwari has books in jurisprudence and principles of jurisprudence. Some of them include:

- Kayfa Naqra' al-Quran (How we read the Quran)
- Mabahith Fi al-Manthuma al-Riwa'iya al-Shi'iya (Research in the system of Shia narrations)

== See also ==
- Abd al-A'la al-Sabziwari
- Abu al-Qasim al-Khoei
- Mohammad Taqi al-Modarresi
