= Mohammad Reza Modarresi =

Shia Iranian scholar and teacher

Ayatollah Sayyid Muhammad-Reza Modarresi
- سيد محمد رضا حسيني مدرسي

Personal life
- Born: 1931 Mashhad, Iran
- Died: September 18, 1980 (aged 48–49) Quchan, Iran
- Resting place: Imam Reza Shrine
- Parent: Mohammed Ali Modarresi (father)
- Relatives: Mohammad Taqi al-Modarresi (first cousin); Abd al-A'la Sabziwari (uncle-in-law; father-in-law)

Religious life
- Religion: Islam
- Denomination: Twelver Shīʿā

Ayatollah Sayyid Muhammad-Reza Husayni Modarresi (Persian: محمد رضا حسينى مدرسى; 1931–18 September 1980) was a Shia Iranian scholar and teacher. He is the cousin of grand Ayatollah, Muhammad-Taqi al-Modarresi.

== Early life and family ==
Modarresi was born into a distinguished Shia religious family in Mashhad in 1931. His father is Ayatollah Muhammad-Ali Modarresi, the grandson of grand Ayatollah, Muhammad-Baqir Golpayegani (also known as Jorfadiqani). He claims descent from Zayd ibn Ali (died c. 740 AD), the great-great-grandson of the Islamic prophet, Muhammad.

His father was one of the servants and teachers at the holy shrine of Imam Reza. Due to the pressures of the Kashf-e-Hijab policy, the whole family migrated to Karbala and Najaf.

== Religious career ==
Modarresi pursued his preliminary religious studies in Najaf under its scholars, and continued his intermediate studies under Ayatollah Zabihullah Quchani. He attended advanced (kharij) classes with grand Ayatollahs, Abu al-Qasim al-Khoei and Abd al-A'la Sabziwari. He benefited greatly from their tutelage.

In 1968 he returned to Mashhad, where he led congregational prayers at the Mihrabkhan Mosque on Tabarsi Street, preaching to the people, offering guidance to believers, and attending to the needs of the poor and destitute.

He contributed significantly to the legal preparation and groundwork for the establishing of Ayatollah Khoei's Dar al-Ilm Islamic Seminary in Mashhad.

== Personal life ==
Modarresi was married to his cousin, the daughter of grand Ayatollah, Abd al-A'la Sabziwari.

Ayatollah Zabihullah Quchani was married to his sister.

== Death ==
On 18 September 1980, as a result of a car accident on the Shirvan-Quchan road, Modarresi passed away. He was laid to rest in the Imam Reza shrine, in Sahn-e Enqelab (the Revolution Courtyard).

== See also ==
- Mohammed Taqi al-Modarresi
- Abd al-A'la Sabziwari
- Abu al-Qasim al-Khoei
- Al-Modarresi family
