= Morvarid =

Murvarid (Persian: مروارید) may refer to:

- Operation Murvarid
- Murvarid Palace
- Murvarid, Khuzestan
- Murvarid, Kurdistan
- Murvarid, Markazi
- Morvarid, Zanjan
- Hasanali Morvarid
- Mohammed Taqi Morvarid
