= Al-Qazwini family =

Iraqi religious Shia family

House of Qazwini آل القزويني Qazwinis
- Founded: 1783; 243 years ago in Karbala
- Founder: Muhammad-Baqir al-Qazwini; Muhammad-Ali al-Qazwini
- Current head: Murtadha al-Qazwini

The family of al-Qazwini (Arabic: آل القزويني, romanized: ʾĀl al-Qazwīnī), also transliterated in a number of other ways, including al-Qazweeni or al-Qazvini are an Iraqi religious Shia family that settled in Karbala from Qazvin, in the late 18th century.

The family rose to great prominence in Iraq. Members of the family are notable for being the Ayatollahs of Karbala. Some of its members are founders of a number of Islamic centres in the United States. Additionally the family claim agnatic descent from Muhammad's daughter Fatimah, carrying the honorific title of Sayyid, and the children of the females of this family whose fathers are non Sayyids carry the title Mirza.

== History and Lineage ==
The al-Qazwini family is a religious intellectual family, that followed through for generations. Its patriarch is Sayyid Muhammad-Baqir al-Qazwini, who is known as muallim al-sultan (teacher of the sultan) because he was the teacher of Dowlatshah. He emigrated from his hometown, to Najaf in 1771, and then to Karbala, where he settled in 1783. Muhammad-Baqir was accompanied by his brother Muhammad-Ali al-Qazwini.

The lineage of the al-Qazwini family is as follows:

ʿAbd al-Karīm bin Niʿmatullāh bin Murtadha bin Radhi al-Dīn bin Aḥmed bin Muḥammad bin Ḥusayn bin ʿAbdallāh bin Muḥammad bin Aḥmed bin Musa bin Ḥusayn bin Ibrāhīm bin Ḥasan bin Muḥammad bin Mājid bin Maʿad bin Ismaʿīl bin Yaḥya bin Muḥammad bin Aḥmed al-Zāhid bin Ibrahim al-Mujāb bin Muḥammad al-ʿAābid bin Musa al-Kāthim bin Jaʿfar as-Sādiq bin Muḥammad al-Bāqir bin ʿAli al-Sajjad bin Ḥusayn al-Shahid bin ʿAli Ibna Abi Talib.

== Persecution in Iraq ==
=== Communism ===
During the days of the communist red tide, under the rule of Abd al-Karim Qasim, Sayyid Murtadha al-Qazwini supported Ayatollah Sayyid Muhsin al-Hakim's fatwa deeming communism tantamount to infidelity and atheism. He took a strong stance against Qasim, by rejecting to join the iftar he had prepared for the religious convoy in Ramadan, 1960, which lead to his imprisonment, making him the first cleric to become a political prisoner in Baghdad.

=== Baathism ===
With the advent of the despotic Baathist regime in the late 1960s and early 1970s, The al-Qazwini family and other Shia scholars and clerics increased efforts to educate the masses to combat the regime. Sayyid Mortadha al-Qazwini and his first cousin, once removed, Sayyid Mohammed Kadhim al-Qazwini were among the leading scholars in engaging in Islamic activism against the regime. After several years, the regime identified the al-Qazwini family as an ideological threat to his regime. In 1980, Ayatollah Sayyid Muhammad-Sadiq al-Qazwini, was arrested and imprisoned by Saddam Hussein because he did not support the Baathist regime. Amnesty International deemed him as the oldest political prisoner in the world at the time. Following the few weeks after the collapse of the regime in 2003, the family found documents verifying his death in Saddam's prisons.

== Notable Members ==
=== First Generation ===
- Muhammad-Baqir al-Qazwini was the son of Abd al-Karim al-Qazwini, he was an alim and teacher. He was known as muallim al-sultan (teacher of the sultan) as he taught Dowlatshah. He travelled from Qazvin to Karbala in 1783.
- Muhammad-Ali al-Qazwini was the son of Abd al-Karim al-Qazwini, he was an alim. He travelled with his brother Muhammad-Baqir to Karbala in 1783.

=== Second Generation ===
- Ibrahim al-Qazwini (1799–1848) was the son of Muhammad-Baqir al-Qazwini, he was a senior jurist, and most famous for authoring Dhawabit al-Usul, which is a book of usul courses by Sharif al-'Ulama. He also participated in the building of the wall of Samarra, as well as the gilding of the iwan of the Abbas shrine.
- Muhammad-Hashim al-Qazwini (died 1908) was the son of Muhammad-Ali al-Qazwini, he was a senior jurist and lead the prayers in the Husayn shrine. He was granted religious authority by his teachers' Murtadha al-Ansari and Muhammad Hasan al-Najafi. He is buried in the Husayn shrine.

=== Third Generation ===
- Muhammad-Tahir al-Qazwini (died 1911) was the son of Mehdi al-Qazwini, and grandson of Muhammad-Baqir. He was an alim, and was most known for authoring Hidayat al-Musnafin (Guiding the Ranks), a book on Imamate. He is buried in the Abbas shrine.
- Muhammad-Ridha al-Qazwini (died 1929) was the son of Muhammad-Hashim al-Qazwini, he was an alim and lead the prayers in the Husayn shrine after his father. He is buried in the Husayn shrine.
- Muhammad-Ibrahim al-Qazwini (died 1941) was the son of Muhammad-Hashim al-Qazwini, he was an alim and lead the prayers in the Abbas shrine. He is buried in the Husayn shrine.

=== Fourth Generation ===
- Muhammad-Mehdi al-Qazwini (died 1932) was the son of Muhammad-Tahir al-Qazwini, he was an alim and poet. He is known for authoring Huda al-Musanafin (Guidance of the Ranks), a critique on Shaykhism. He is buried in the Husayn shrine.
- Muhammad-Hassan al-Qazwini (1879–1960) was the son of Muhammad-Baqir Agha-Mir al-Qazwini and grandson of Mehdi al-Qazwini. He is most known for authoring al-Imam al-Kubra (The Grand Imamate), a book that rebuts Ibn Taymiyyah's Minhaj al-Sunnah (Syllabus of the Sunnis).
- Muhammad-Husayn al-Qazwini (died 1939) was the son of Muhammad-Tahir al-Qazwini, he was a senior grand ayatollah, and lead the prayers in the Abbas shrine. He is buried in the Abbas shrine.
- Hussain al-Qazwini (died 1947) was the son of Muhammad-Baqir al-Qazwini, and grandson of Ibrahim al-Qazwini. He was an alim, and one of the disciples of Mirza Muhammad-Taqi al-Shirazi, and supported him throughout the Iraqi revolt of 1920. He was imprisoned in Hillah with other freedom fighters. He is buried in the Husayn shrine.
- Muhammad-Kadhim al-Qazwini (1930–1994) was the son of Muhammad-Ibrahim al-Qazwini, he was an alim, poet and orator. He was most known for his Min al-Mahd Ila al-Lahd (From the Cradle to the Grave) series on the biographies of the Ahl al-Bayt. He is buried in the Husayn shrine.
- Muhammad-Sadiq al-Qazwini (1900–disappeared in 1980) was the son of Muhammad-Ridha al-Qazwini, he was an alim. He was abducted by the Baath regime in 1980, and has disappeared ever since.

=== Fifth Generation ===
- Muhammad-Salih al-Qazwini (1900–1956) was the son of Muhammad-Mehdi al-Qazwini, he was an alim and orator. He is most famous for authoring al-Mawidha al-Hasina (The Good Instruction), which is a critique of Ali al-Wardi's Wuadh al-Salatin (The Sultans Preachers'). He is buried in the Abbas shrine.
- Ibrahim Shams al-Din al-Qazwini (1900–1981) was the son of Hussain al-Qazwini, he was an alim and researcher. He is most known for authoring al-Buyutat al-Alawiya Fi Karbala (The Alid Households of Karbala).
- Hashim al-Qazwini (died 2009) was the son of Muhammad-Sadiq al-Qazwini. He was a jurist. He is buried in the Abbas shrine.
- Murtadha al-Qazwini (b. 1930) is the son of Muhammad-Sadiq al-Qazwini. He is a renowned jurist, poet and orator. He gives lectures in the Husayn shrine every Thursday night. He is the founder of the Imam al-Sadiq School for Orphans and the al-Hujja Hospital in Karbala.

=== Sixth Generation ===
- Baqir al-Qazwini (died 1974) was the son of Muhammad-Salih al-Qazwini, he was an alim, and most known for performing marriage and divorce contracts. He was a firm supporter of al-shaaer al-husayniya (the Husayni symbols). He is buried in the Abbas shrine.
- Jawad al-Qazwini (born 1953) is the son of Muhammad-Salih al-Qazwini, he is an alim and orator. He founded the Sayyida Zaynab School of Oratory in Damascus and Karbala.
- Moustafa al-Qazwini (b. 1961) is the son of Murtadha al-Qazwini, he is an alim and orator. He is the founder and director of the Islamic Educational Center of Orange County, California.
- Mohammed al-Qazwini (born 1962) is the son of Murtadha al-Qazwini, he is an alim and orator.
- Hassan al-Qazwini (b. 1964) is the son of Murtadha al-Qazwini, he is an alim and orator. He is the founder and director of the Islamic Institute of America in Dearborn Heights, Michigan.
- Hossein al-Qazwini (born 1982) is the son of Murtadha al-Qazwini, he is an alim and orator.

=== Seventh Generation ===
- Muhsin al-Qazwini (born 1952) is the son of Baqir al-Qazwini, he is a professor in Islamic studies. He is the founder of Ahl al-Bayt University in Karbala.
- Muhammad-Baqir al-Qazwini (born 1985) is the son of Hassan al-Qazwini, he is an alim and orator.
- Muhammad-Jawad al-Qazwini is the son of Ali al-Qazwini, and grandson of Murtadha. He is an alim and orator.
- Hadi al-Qazwini is the son of Moustafa al-Qazwini, he is an alim and orator.
- Ahmed al-Qazwini is the son of Hassan al-Qazwini, he is an alim and orator.

== Pictures ==
Some of the members of the al-Qazwini family:

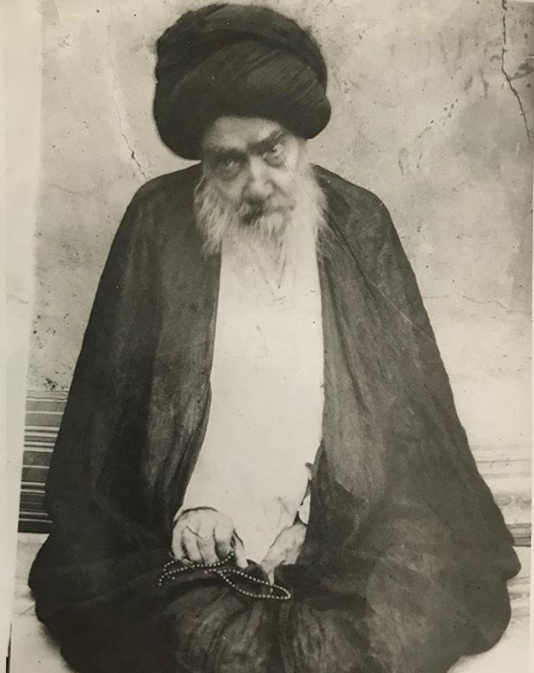
Muhammad-Hashim al-Qazwini

Muhammad-Sadiq al-Qazwini

== See also ==
- Al-Shahrestani family
- Al-Modarresi family
