= Hassan al-Qazwini =

Iraqi-American Shia Imam

Hujjat al-Islam Sayyid Hassan al-Qazwini
- السيد حسن الموسوي القزويني
- Title: Hujjat al-Islam

Personal life
- Born: 16 October 1964 (age 61) Karbala, Iraq
- Children: Mohammed Baqer; Ahmed
- Parent: Murtadha al-Qazwini (father)
- Relatives: Moustafa al-Qazwini (brother) Mahdi al-Modarresi (first cousin, once removed); Fadhil al-Milani (cousin)
- Website: Official Website

Religious life
- Religion: Islam
- Denomination: Twelver Shīʿā
- Institute: Islamic Institute of America

Muslim leader
- Based in: Dearborn Heights, Michigan
- Period in office: 2015 - 2020
- Previous post: Imam at the Islamic Center of America, 1997–2014

Sayyid Hassan al-Musawi al-Qazwini (Arabic: حسن الموسوي القزويني; born October 16, 1964) is an Iraqi-American Shia Imam.

He was the resident scholar of the Islamic Center of America for eighteen years. He then founded the Islamic Institute of America in Dearborn Heights, Michigan.

== Early life and education ==
Al-Qazwini was born in Karbala in 1964. His father is Murtadha al-Qazwini from the al-Qazwini family, and his mother is the daughter of Abd al-Amir Nasrallah, from the Nasrallah family. His family was exiled from Iraq whilst he was still young, and upon settling in Qom in 1980, he joined the seminary and began his religious education.

He completed his religious education in 1992 and managed to grasp an in-depth understanding of the fundamentals of Islamic jurisprudence and Quranic commentary. During his studies, he administered a prominent Islamic journal called an-Nibras (The eternal light).

== Immigration to the United States ==
=== Los Angeles ===
Al-Qazwini immigrated to the United States in late 1992 along with his family, six years after his father's immigration. He spent four years in Los Angeles, where he directed the Azzahra Islamic Center, which was founded by his father, and conducted several Fiqh and various other Islamic classes. He realized the importance of disseminating the message of Islam in North America in English, especially to the youth. While numerous scholars and religious leaders performed a good job reaching out to the Arabic speaking members of the community, the English-speaking generations needed someone who was capable of communicating with them, and so al-Qazwini devoted himself to learning and acquiring a fair grasp of the English language quickly.

=== Dearborn ===
In early 1993, al-Qazwini was invited by the Islamic Center of America (ICA) in Dearborn; the oldest Shia mosque in the United States, as a guest speaker for the Arabic program during Ramadan, where the local community quickly found him responsive to their spiritual and religious needs. The ICA asked him to join them the following year as their guest speaker during Ramadan and then for the first ten nights of Muharram.

In 1997, al-Qazwini established residence in Dearborn, at the behest of the Islamic Center of America. al-Qazwini conducted the Friday prayer every week, delivering the first sermon in Arabic and the second in English. He also performed an English presentation during the Sunday service, usually aimed at addressing of current issues affecting the local Muslim community as well as the global community at large.

Whilst at the ICA, al-Qazwini established the sub-committee, Young Muslim Association (YMA) in 1998. The organization was aimed at educating Muslim-American youth, fostering leadership, and creating an environment in which they can actively and effectively channel their efforts in promoting Islam. In its first five years, the YMA grew to be one of the largest Muslim youth organizations in North America.

=== Dearborn Heights ===
In 2015, al-Qazwini left the ICA and opened his own mosque, known as the Islamic Institute of America. He also established the Muslim Youth Connection (MYC) as the new youth organization.

== Public appearances ==
Since the September 11 attacks, al-Qazwini stepped up his efforts to act as an ambassador for Muslim Americans, speaking at numerous churches, colleges and universities, hoping to dispel what he sees as common misconceptions about them.

He has met with Presidents Bill Clinton and George W. Bush, as well as with then senator Barack Obama.

al-Qazwini met Pope Francis during the Abrahamic Faiths Initiative on January 14, 2020 in Vatican City. The initiative brought leaders from Christianity, Judaism and Islam to work together to promote peaceful expression of faith and the renunciation of violence.

al-Qazwini endorsed Bernie Sanders in March, 2020. He addressed a Dearborn rally in Arabic on Saturday, encouraging support for Sanders.

== Works ==
Al-Qazwini authored two books:

- Meditation on Sahihain: A Critique of Sahih Al-Bukhari and Sahih Muslim
- Prophet Mohammad: The Ethical Prospect

=== American Crescent ===
Al-Qazwini is the author of American Crescent: A Muslim Cleric on the Power of His Faith, the Struggle Against Prejudice, and the Future of Islam and America.

Rashid Khalidi of Columbia University wrote in The New York Times:

This book is many things. It is, first, a personal chronicle of Imam Hassan Qazwini's own trajectory from Karbala, Iraq, where he was born in 1964, to exile in Kuwait and Iran, to Dearborn, Mich., where he currently heads the Islamic Center of America. Second, it is an argument for Qazwini's variety of Shia Islam, rooted in Iraq and Iran and adapted for America. Finally, it is a political statement — in fact, two of them — a plea for Muslim Americans to immerse themselves in the life of the United States while simultaneously deepening their identification as Muslims, and also for a particular outcome in Iraq, where Qazwini's father, a leading ayatollah, is Imam of the mosque of Imam Hussein in Karbala.

== Personal life ==
Al-Qazwini is married to the daughter of Muhammad al-Shirazi. He has four sons, including Muhammad Baqer and Ahmed.

== See also ==
- Islam in Detroit
- History of the Middle Eastern people in Metro Detroit
- Al-Qazwini family
