= Ahlulbayt TV =

British Shia Muslim TV channel

- Country: United Kingdom
- Broadcast area: Ireland, United States, Africa, Middle East, Australia
- Headquarters: London

Programming
- Language: English

History
- Launched: 17 August 2009

Links
- Website: ahlulbayt.co.uk

Availability

Streaming media
- Live Webcast: ahlulbayt.co.uk/live

Ahlulbayt Television Network is the first exclusively English-language Shia Islamic television channel. The channel was launched with much fanfare on Sky in the UK on 17 August 2009 and two months later on the Galaxy 19 platform covering North America from its London headquarters. A few months into its operations it also expanded to Atlantic Bird 4A (Nilesat) which covers the Middle East and North Africa. The channel now broadcasts by satellite only from Astra 2G at 28.2°E

The nonprofit religious channel, whose name is Arabic for the 'Holy Household', referring to Ahl al-Bayt, the progeny of the Islamic prophet, Muhammad, is staffed by British professionals from various backgrounds. In an interview in 2004 with a Kuwaiti magazine, Sayed Mahdi al-Modarresi had announced his hopes to launch the channel to "show the true, undistorted nature of Islam and Islamic civilization to the West".

Ahlulbayt TV frequently features prominent Shia Muslims scholars and intellectuals including Sayed Fadhel Milani, Sayed Mahdi Modarresi, Sayed Mustafa Qazwini, Sayed Mohammad Rizvi, Sayed Mohammed Mousawi, Rebecca Masterton, Zahra Al Alawi, Amina Inloes, as well as others, and also broadcast live video feeds from the Holy City of Karbala.

The network's line-up includes several live call-in shows featuring guests who are invited to discuss religious and social matters. The channel, which seems to enjoy great popularity amongst Western-born Muslim youths, was also featured in Shelina Janmohamed's book Generation M: Young Muslims Changing the World. The channel preaches moderation and has several shows dedicated to women, presented by females from various backgrounds. "Reverts World" is also a weekly show dedicated to highlighting the challenges faced by converts. Its stated aim is to "serve the new generation of Muslims living in the West, addressing contemporary issues through cutting-edge programming and world-class shows"

In early 2010 the channel launched its on-screen news ticker which frequently condemned "terrorist attacks" and extremist statements. To refocus the channel towards its religious and cultural ethos, the news ticker has since been taken down.

The channel's financial backing comes from viewers' donations and frequently asks viewers to partner with it in addition to ads and sponsorships.
