= Masterton (disambiguation) =

Masterton is a large town in New Zealand.

Masterton may also refer to:

- Masterton (New Zealand electorate), an electoral district based around Masterton, New Zealand
- Masterton (soccer), a soccer club based in Masterton, New Zealand that merged with Carterton in 1996 to form Wairarapa United
- Masterton Aerodrome, an airfield in Masterton, New Zealand
- Masterton railway station, a railway station in Masterton, New Zealand
- Masterton Trophy, a National Hockey League award named after Bill Masterton

== Surname ==
- Bill Masterton (1938–1968), ice hockey player
- Danny Masterton (1954–2020), Scottish footballer
- Graham Masterton (born 1946), British horror author
- James Masterton (born 1973), music writer and columnist
- Nancy Masterton (1930–2015), American legislator
- Rebecca Masterton, British Islamic scholar
- Steven Masterton (born 1985), Scottish footballer
