= Hadi al-Modarresi =

Iraqi-Iranian Grand Ayatollah

Ayatollah Sayyid Hadi al-Modarresi
- السيد هادي الحسيني المدرسي
- Title: Ayatollah

Personal life
- Born: 1947 (age 78–79) Karbala, Iraq
- Children: Mahdi; Muhammed-Ali; Mustafa; Husayn; Muhammad-Kadhim
- Parent: Mohammed Kadhim al-Modarresi (father)
- Relatives: Mohammad Taqi al-Modarresi (brother); Ali Akbar al-Modarresi (brother); Mirza Mahdi al-Shirazi (grandfather); Muhammad al-Shirazi (maternal uncle); Abd al-A'la al-Sabziwari (uncle-in-law)
- Website: http://www.hadialmodarresi.com/

Religious life
- Religion: Islam
- Denomination: Twelver Shīʿā

Ayatollah Sayyid Hadi al-Husayni al-Modarresi (Arabic: هادي الحسيني المدرسي; Persian: هادى حسينى مدرسى; b. 1947), is an Iraqi-Iranian Shia scholar, leader and orator. He is viewed as a charismatic speaker, enamoring many Muslims, radiating a certain magnetism in his oratory. He spent much of his career in opposition to the Bathist government, and he spent many years in exile, particularly in Bahrain. Al-Modarresi returned to Iraq following the 2003 invasion of Iraq, and administers humanitarian projects in there.

== Family ==
Al-Modarresi was born into a distinguished Shia religious family in Karbala in Iraq. His father is Grand Ayatollah Sayyid Muhammad-Kadhim al-Modarresi, the grandson of grand Ayatollah Sayyid Muhammad-Baqir Golpayegani (also known as Jorfadiqani). His mother is the daughter of grand Ayatollah Sayyid Mahdi al-Shirazi. He claims descent from Zayd ibn Ali (died c. 740 AD), the great-great-grandson of the Islamic prophet, Muhammad.

== Biography ==
=== Early life ===
Al-Modarresi began his religious education in the religious seminaries of Karbala, at the age of thirteen. He actively sought his religious studies under the auspices of many high ranking scholars, such as Sheikh Hasan al-A'lami, Sheikh Muhammad al-Karbassi, Shaykh Jafar al-Rushti, Shaykh Muhamamd-Husayn al-Mazindarani and his uncles, Sayyids Muhammad, Hassan and Sadiq al-Shirazi. In the late sixties, he and his uncle, Mujtaba al-Shirazi, attended the class of Sayyid Ruhollah Khomeini, and became one of his closest students. He completed the advanced level of his religious education in his early twenties.

=== Bathist opposition ===
Al-Modarresi's advocacy of political freedom and strong stance against terrorism started from an early age when Saddam Hussein took power in Iraq. Seventeen members of his wife's family–Al-Qazwini–were executed by Saddam's regime or simply disappeared in the notorious Bathist penitentiaries. Al-Modarresi wrote the first book to openly attack the regime, published by a religious scholar. Published under a pseudonym in Beirut, the book was titled No To Rulers of Iraq and sparked a massive political crisis in Baghdad and caused the Bathist regime to issue an ultimatum for the removal of all Lebanese nationals from Iraq within 72 hours.

Al-Modarresi eluded execution by moving from house to house, often living in cellars for months and traveling in disguise. When his uncle, Hasan was imprisoned, and the pressures of the Bathists anti-Shia sentiment peaked, Al-Modarresi left Iraq in 1970, for Lebanon, and then briefly joined his brother Muhammad-Taqi, in Kuwait.

=== Bahraini leadership ===
In 1973, he emigrated to Bahrain, and exercised his religious activism there. In 1974, he was granted Bahraini citizenship. In Bahrain, al-Modarresi rose to national prominence, and was awarded with power of representation from grand religious authorities such as Muhammad al-Shirazi, Ruhollah Khomeini, Shihab al-Din al-Marashi, and Abd al-A'la al-Sabziwari, being labelled as a scholar "worthy of taking a leadership position" and urging Muslims to follow his lead.

In 1979, the Bahraini authorities placed a travel ban on al-Modarresi, after his organisation, the Islamic Front for Liberation of Bahrain (a branch of his brother's (Muhammad-Taqi) larger risali movement), was announced in the press, being dubbed as an organisation that wanted to import the Iranian revolution into Bahrain, and pointing the finger at al-Modarresi, as its leader. In August of that year, he was kidnapped by the Bahraini intelligence and locked up in a car for up to fourteen hours. However, there was an international uproar, with the interference of some of the Islamic republic's senior leaders, and Yasser Arafat personally, that pressured the Bahraini government to release him, and send him over to Iran, with an apology.

=== Exile in Iran ===
Whilst in Iran, al-Modarresi continued his activism and kept supporting the Bahraini population against the Al Khalifah regime. The IFLB came to prominence as the front organisation for the 1981 coup, which attempted to install al-Modarresi as the spiritual leader of a newly established theocratic Shia state. However the coup failed, and so al-Modarresi reorganised the structure of the Front, focusing on its information efforts in Europe.

Al-Modarresi became a founding member of the Supreme Council for the Islamic Revolution in Iraq (SCIRI), and was among the active figures of the Iraqi opposition in exile. He was closely involved in efforts to expose and bring down the regime in Baghdad. He managed to escape a number of assassination attempts abroad, including one in Brazil in 1991 as well as two more attempts in Syria, by the Bathist intelligence operatives, in 2001.

=== Return to Iraq ===
Upon returning to Iraq after the fall of Saddam's regime, he was greeted by over thirty thousand people in Baghdad, fifty thousand in Sadr City and a similar crowd in his hometown, Karbala.

Al-Modarresi established a television station upon his return to his hometown. He is also involved in several large-scale humanitarian projects in Iraq and has been involved in the building of mosques, schools, medical clinics, orphanages, and has been a staunch advocate of women's rights and consistently speaks out against the oppression of women in his lectures and books. He also facilitates marriage by providing financial help to people who wish to get married and has organized several large mass marriage ceremonies. sl-Modarresi also founded and currently heads the League of Religious Scholars which brings together many high ranking Shi’ite scholars or their representatives in Iraq.

== Personal life ==
Al-Modarresi is married to the daughter of prominent scholar, Hashim al-Qazwini (d. 2009), the elder brother of Murtadha al-Qazwini. He has five sons (Mahdi, Muhammad-Ali, Mustafa, Husayn and Muhammad-Kadhim). All of his sons are clerics.

=== COVID-19 ===
In March 2020, al-Modarresi contracted the virus, but has since recovered and reported to be in good health.

== Works ==
Al-Modarresi has authored more than 250 books. Some of his books were published under different pen names such as 'Muhammad Hadi' and 'Abdallah al-Hashimi', and 'Muhammad al-Amin Association'.

Some of al-Modarresi's books include:

- Al-Modarresi, Sayed Hadi (12 November 2015). God's Sacrifice: The Epic Saga of Hussein and His Legendary Martyrdom. ISBN 978-0994240927.
- Al-Modarresi, Sayed Hadi (22 May 2017). Heated Debate on Atheism. ISBN 978-1548180010.
- المدرسي, هادي (2002). How to Beat Failure, Advise on Success and Time Management (in Arabic). ISBN 978-9953299563.
- المدرسي, هادي (2002). Art of Success (in Arabic). ISBN 978-9953299532. (7 Volumes)
- How to Enjoy Life and Live Happily (in Arabic).
- And They Ask You About Things (in Arabic).
- Shortcuts To Glory (in Arabic).
- Supplications of the Quran (in Arabic).
- A B Islam (in Arabic).
- Supplications of the Quran (in Arabic).
- Universal Challenges, Refurbishing Civilisation (in Arabic).
- Mannerisms of the Commander of the Faithful (in Arabic). (3 Volumes)
- Ashura (in Arabic).
- The Martyr and the Revolution (in Arabic).
- The Message of a Muslim.. To Save the World (in Arabic).
- Critique on Marxism (in Arabic).
- Response to Satanic Verses Book (in Arabic).
- Friend and Friendship (in Arabic).
