= Murtadha al-Qazwini =

Iraqi Ayatollah and orator (born 1930)

Ayatollah Sayyid Murtadha al-Qazwini
- السيد مرتضى الموسوي القزويني

Personal life
- Born: 1 August 1930 (age 96) Karbala, Iraq
- Children: Ali; Mustafa; Muhammad; Hassan; Jafar; Hossein
- Parent: Muhammad-Sadiq al-Qazwini (father)
- Relatives: Mohammed Kadhim al-Qazwini (first cousin, once removed); Mohammed Baqer al-Qazwini (grandson); Fadhil al-Milani (nephew); Mahdi al-Modarresi (great nephew); Muhsin al-Qazwini (first cousin, once removed)
- Website: Official website

Religious life
- Religion: Islam
- Denomination: Twelver Shīʿā

Ayatollah Sayyid Murtadha al-Musawi al-Qazwini (Arabic: مرتضى الموسوي القزويني; born 1 August 1930) is an Iraqi senior Shia jurist, poet and orator.

Al-Qazwini is currently the Imam of the eastern wing of the Imam Husayn shrine. He lived in exile for twenty three years between Kuwait, Iran and the United States, until he returned to Iraq after the 2003 invasion.

Al-Qazwini is the founder of the Development and Relief Foundation, a charitable institution that has established schools, a seminary, a state of the art hospital, and clinic in Karbala.

Al-Qazwini is currently the chief of the al-Qazwini family.

== Early life and education ==
Al-Qazwini was born in Karbala to the prominent religious al-Qazwini family. His father was Ayatollah Sayyid Muhammad-Sadiq al-Qazwini, a mujtahid, that was the Imam at the Abbas shrine. He was abducted by the Baathist regime on April 18, 1980. He has been missing ever since. His mother was the daughter of his third cousin, once remove, Sayyid Muhammad-Mehdi al-Qazwini, a alim and poet, most known for authoring Huda al-Musanafin (Guidance of the Ranks), a critique on Shaykhism. He is the fourth of seven children.

Al-Qazwini naturally began his religious education at a young age. He carried out theological studies and academic education concurrently, and at the age of seventeen, was awarded by Salih Jabr, for being the highest achieving student in the country.

In his religious education, he studied his intermediate stages under Sheikh Jafar al-Rashti, Sheikh Muhammad al-Khatib and his third cousin, once removed Sayyid Muhammad-Hassan Agha-Mir al-Qazwini.

As for the advanced stages, he studied them under Mirza Mahdi al-Shirazi, Sheikh Yusuf al-Khurasani and Sayyid Muhammad-Hadi al-Milani.

In 1942, he studied oratory under the supervision of his maternal uncle, Sayyid Muhammad-Salih al-Qazwini, who was a renowned cleric and orator. His uncle authored al-Mawidha al-Hasina (The Good Instruction), a critique of Ali al-Wardi's Wuadh al-Salatin (The Sultans Preachers').

By the 1950s, he was giving sermons in the Husayn shrine. Consequently, he began to travel to other countries in the Persian Gulf region, to deliver religious speeches.

Al-Qazwini was really interested to study in the Al-Azhar University, and so he travelled to Cairo to and enrolled into the university. However, upon looking into the syllabus, he realised that the studies were not as advanced as he imagined them to be, and that he felt the level in Karbala was of much higher calibre, which led him to abandon his studies in Al-Azhar, and return to Karbala.

In 1953, he was granted ijaza's from Sayyid Abd al-Husayn Sharaf al-Din, Sheikh Agha Bozorg al-Tehrani and al-Milani. The following year, the Imam Sadiq primary school was established, and al-Qazwini was made headmaster. He then resigned a few years later and went on to get married, go to the Hajj and visit many other countries.

== Activism ==
=== Communist and Baathist Iraq ===
During the days of the communist red tide, under the rule of Abd al-Karim Qasim, al-Qazwini supported Ayatollah Sayyid Muhsin al-Hakim's fatwa deeming communism an infidelity and atheist. He took a strong stance against Qasim, by rejecting to join the iftar he had prepared for the religious convoy in Ramadan, 1960, which lead to his imprisonment, making him the first cleric to become a political prisoner in Baghdad.

After the Baathist regime took control in 1968, severe persecution began to gradually be administered towards the Shias, specifically the clerical class. As a result, al-Qazwini could not remain in home country for too long, and had to flee Iraq.

=== Exile ===
Al-Qazwini fled to Kuwait in October, 1971 and picked up where he left off in Iraq from delivering speeches to teaching jurisprudence classes. In 1980, he travelled to Iran after the Iranian revolution, and carried on his duties and activities, raising awareness of the teachings of the Ahl al-Bayt. In Qom, he spent a few years teaching in its seminaries, and led the Friday prayers at the Jamkaran Mosque. In Tehran, he served as a professor in Shahid Motahari University as well as a judge in the Islamic republic's judiciary system, appointed by Ruhollah Khomeini. He led the Friday prayers at the al-Qodos Mosque.

In 1985, he emigrated to the United States, and settled in Los Angeles. He gained representation of the grand maraja' of his time and began to widen the spectrum of his communication of Islam.

== Return to Iraq ==
After the 2003 Iraqi invasion, al-Qazwini immediately returned to his Iraq and settled in Karbala. al-Qazwini claimed the Shirazi wing (eastern side) of the Husayn shrine and became the Imam of the daily prayers. He also performs a sermon after the congregational prayer.

In 2004, al-Qazwini founded the Development and Relief Foundation (DRF). al-Qazwini embarked on a mission to revive Karbala. The DRF has established a school, orphanage, Islamic Seminary, hospital and clinic.

In 2008, he sponsored and lead the efforts of constructing the Imam Al-Hujjah Hospital, a first of its kind charitable hospital in the region, that is solely founded on donations of philanthropists at large. This ambitious enterprise has gained interest and recognition of several healthcare institutes in North America, among which are the Institute of International Health at Michigan State University and Hardin Memorial Hospital in Louisville.

In 2007, he was injured in an attempt to assassinate him as he was on his way home after delivering his nightly sermon at the Husayn shrine.

== Establishments ==
Al-Qazwini established a number of institutions in his lifetime. In the 1960s, he established and directed al-Kitab wal-Itra Institution for advanced religious studies in Karbala. The institution developed and trained speakers and scholars and dispatched them to all parts of Iraq.

Whilst In the United States, he founded:

- Masjid al-Zahra in Southgate, where he led prayers and offered lectures and religious programs.
- Imam Ali Islamic Center in San Diego, which was directed by his son, Muhammad.
- Islamic Educational Center of Orange Country in Orange County, which as directed by his son Mousafa.
- Assadiq Foundation, which is now known as the Islamic Cultural Center of Fresno in Fresno, which is directed by his son Ali.
- City of Knowledge School in Pomona, which is a full-time academic Islamic school.

After Al-Qazwini returned to Iraq in 2003, he founded Imam al-Sadiq School, a state-of-the-art full-time Islamic school in Karbala.

== Works ==
=== Books ===
Al-Qazwini has written numerous books including:

- al-Nubuwa wal-Anbiya' Fi Nathar Ahl al-Bayt (Prophethood and Prophets in the perspective of the Ahl al-Bayt)
- al-Mahdi al-Muntathar (The Awaited Mehdi)
- A'lam al-Shia (Notables of the Shia). Three volumes, 1) al-Alamah al-Hilli. 2) al-Tusi. 3) Baha al-Din al-Ameli.

=== Poetry ===
Al-Qazwini has written many verses of poetry, mostly in memory of the Ahl al-Bayt, either in praise or mourning. His most famous poem, about Husayn ibn Ali is as follows:

قـَدْ سَـالَ قَلْبِي فِي هَوَاكَ قَصِيدَا
فـَطَـفِقتُ أنظِمُ عَنْ عَلُاكَ عُقُودَا
وَ رَفَـعْـتُـهَا لِــتَــنَالَ نَـظْرَتِكَ الَـتِــي
تَـرَكْـتُ حَصَاهَا جَوْهَراً مَنْــضُــودَا

Translation:

My heart pours in your love; a poem,
That continued to write of your greatness for decades.
I raised it so that it is worthy of your gaze,
Leaving it, to translate into a shining gem.

== Personal life ==
Al-Qazwini is married to the daughter of Sayyid Abd al-Amir Nasrallah, from the Nasrallah family in Karbala. He has six sons, who have all pursued clerical careers.

== See also ==
- al-Qazwini Family
- Mohammed Kadhim al-Qazwini
- Mirza Mahdi al-Shirazi
