= Moustafa Al-Qazwini =

Islamic religious leader (born 1961)

Hujjatullah Sayyid Moustafa al-Qazwini
- السيد مصطفى الموسوي القزويني
- Title: Hujjatullah

Personal life
- Born: 1961 (age 64–65) Karbala, Iraq
- Children: Mehdi; Hadi
- Parent: Murtadha al-Qazwini (father)
- Relatives: Hassan al-Qazwini (brother); Mahdi al-Modarresi (first cousin, once removed); Fadhil al-Milani (first cousin & father-in-law )

Religious life
- Religion: Islam
- Denomination: Twelver Shīʿā
- Institute: Islamic Educational Center of Orange County

Muslim leader
- Based in: Orange County, California
- Period in office: 1996 - Present

Hujjat al-Islam Sayyid Dr. Moustafa al-Musawi al-Qazwini (Arabic: مصطفى الموسوي القزويني; born 1961) is an Iraqi-American Shia imam.

He is the imam at the Islamic Educational Center of Orange County in Orange Country, California. He is also on the board of directors of the Development and Relief Foundation in Iraq.

== Biography ==
=== Early life and education ===
al-Qazwini was born in Karbala in 1961. His father is Murtadha al-Qazwini from the al-Qazwini family, and his mother is the daughter of Abd al-Amir Nasrallah, from the Nasrallah family. His family was exiled from Iraq whilst he was still young, and upon settling in Qom, in 1980, he joined the seminary and began his religious education.

In 1987, he travelled to Damascus to serve as a teacher at the Islamic seminary. He then travelled to London in 1989, and contributed as associate imam and professor of Islamic studies at several Islamic centers and foundations.

=== Settling in the United States ===
In 1994, al-Qazwini travelled to the United States, where his father and brothers were. He founded the Islamic Cultural Center of San Diego, California. This center was the first Shia mosque established in San Diego County for religious and social events.

In September 1996, he founded the Islamic Educational Center of Orange County (IECOC), drawing on his experience in Islamic studies.

al-Qazwini's past associations have included:

- Chairman of the Development and World Events Committee of the Islamic Shura Council of Southern California (an umbrella organization for sixty-four mosques and Islamic centers), a board member of the council of Shia Muslim scholars of North America.
- Co-chair of the West Coast Dialogue of Muslims and Catholics
- Adviser for the United Muslim American Association.

He spends much of his time lecturing across the world and nationally at churches, universities and on panels with other parishioners.

== Controversy ==
On 23 June 2017 in a sermon delivered in Orange County, California, al-Qazwini declared that ISIS was supported by Israeli intelligence, shortly after a Wall Street Journal investigative article detailed secret Israeli aid to various Syrian rebel groups, which was confirmed by Israeli authorities, including as far back as 2014. Shortly thereafter, describing unreliable information he had received from Iraqi political and military sources, he publicly retracted the statement and apologized for hurting the sentiments of his Jewish friends and the Jewish community.

== Personal life ==
- al-Qazwini is married to the daughter of Fadhil al-Milani. He has two sons: Mahdi and Hadi.

== Bibliography ==
- Discovering Islam
- Inquiries About Shi'a Islam
- When Power and Piety Collide
