= 1822 in Iran =

- Decades
- See also: Other events of 1822; Years in Iran

The following lists events that happened during 1822 in Qajar era.

== Incumbents ==
- Monarch: Fath-Ali Shah Qajar

== Births ==
- March 5 – Ali Reza Khan Azod-ol-Molk, Iranian politician.
- ? – Hasan-Ali Khan Amir Nezam Garrusi, Iranian diplomat, politician, calligrapher and writer.
- ? – Mohammad Hasan Mamaqani, leading mujtahid of Najaf in the 19th century.
