= Hashim al-Shakhs =

Saudi faqih and writer

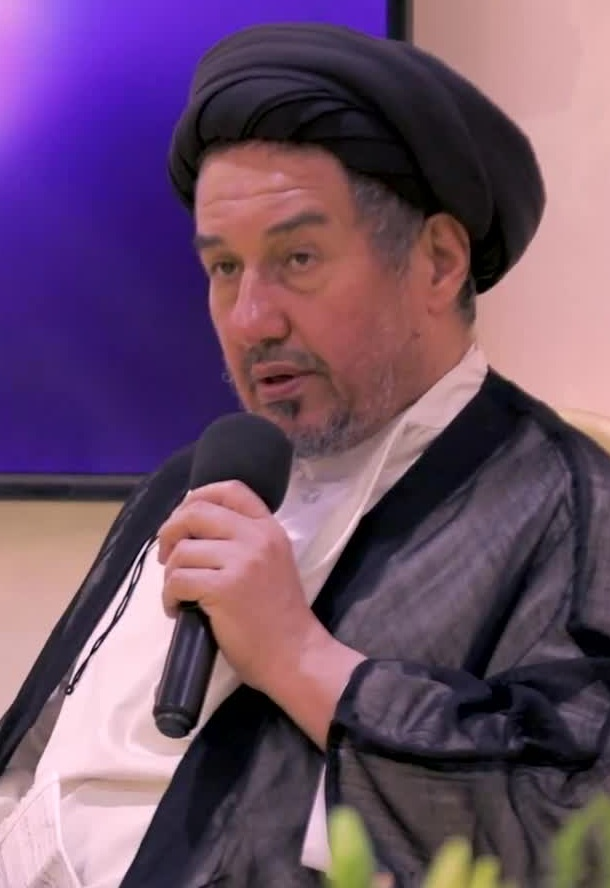
- al-Shakhs in 2019
- Born: September 12, 1957 (age 68); Al Qaraa
- Occupation: Cleric
- Organization: Ahl Al-Bayt World Assembly

Hashim bin Mohammed bin Hashim Al-Shakhs (Arabic: هاشم بن محمد بن هاشم الشخص; born September 12, 1957) is a Saudi faqih and writer. He was born in the town of al-Qaraa in Al-Ahsa Governorate to a Hashimi Musawi family. He was homeschooled by his father and then was sent to Hawza Najaf in Iraq and received religious studies by its scholars, including Baqir al-Irawani, Bashir al-Najafi, and Muhammad Baqir al-Sadr. Then he went to Qom and studied at the hands of Hussein-Ali Montazeri, Hossein Wahid Khorasani, Mohammad Fazel Lankarani and others. He works as an imam and a religious preacher for the Saudi Twelver Shias.
