= Shahrastani =

Shahrastani may refer to:

- al-Shahrastani (1086–1153), Persian historian
- Shahrastani (horse) (1983–2011), Thoroughbred racehorse

== See also ==
- Al-Shahristani family
