= Hasanali Morvarid =

Iranian Shia scholar and teacher

Ayatollah Sheikh Hasanali Morvarid
- شيخ حسنعلى مرواريد
- Title: Ayatollah

Personal life
- Born: 1911 Mashhad, Iran
- Died: October 4, 2004 (aged 92–93) Mashhad, Iran
- Resting place: Imam Reza Shrine
- Parent: Muhammad-Reza Morvarid
- Relatives: Mohammed Taqi Morvarid (first cousin, once removed); Mohammed Kadhim al-Modarresi (first cousin, once removed)

Religious life
- Religion: Islam
- Denomination: Twelver Shīʿā

Ayatollah Sheikh Hasanali Morvarid (Persian: حسنعلى مرواريد; 1911–October 5, 2004) was a senior Iranian Shia scholar and teacher.

He was a widely respected teacher at the Islamic seminary of Mashhad, and a well-known tafkiki figure of the second generation of Tafkikis.

== Early life and education ==
Morvarid was born in Mashhad to the clerical Morvarid family, his father was Sheikh Muhammad-Reza Morvarid. His mother was the daughter of Sheikh Hasanali Tehrani (d. 1907). His cousin Sheikh Muhammad-Taqi Morvarid was a member of the first assembly of experts. His great ancestor was renowned laureate and calligrapher Shihab al-Din Abdullah Morvarid (d. 1514).

=== Education ===
He joined the religious seminary of Mashhad in 1924, and studied under its renowned scholars like Sheikh Hasanali Nukhadaki and Sheikh Hashim Qazwini. He joined the classes of Mirza Mahdi al-Isfahani and continued his studies in advanced jurisprudence and principles of jurisprudence. He mastered doctrinal studies in the school of tafkik. He travelled to Qom in 1946 and continued to study under Hossein Borujerdi. Upon his return to Mashhad, he began to teach his own classes of jurisprudence, and tafkiki's interpretation of doctrinal topics.

== Religious career ==
He used to lead the congregational prayers in several mosques around Mashhad, like Madrasa Mirza Jafar, Hajj Mulla Hashem Mosque and Mulla Haidar Mosque. He also founded two Islamic seminaries in Khorasan Razavi, Mashhad. The first is the Bisat Islamic seminary in Andarzgoo street, and the second is Saadat Islamic seminary in Saheb al-Zaman street.

== Works ==
Morvarid authored Tanbihat Hawl al-Mabda' wal-Ma'ad (Remarks concerning the Beginning and Return), which is a summary of the classes he taught in Mashhad, based on the views of al-Isfahani.

== Personal life ==
Morvardi was married the daughter of Sheikh Muhammad-Taqi Bujnurdi in 1941. He had ten children, seven sons and three daughters. Most of his children and grandchildren are clerics, residing in Mashhad and teaching in its seminaries. His son Mahdi Morvarid is a teacher of bahth kharij (advanced research seminars in religious jurisprudence), and representative of grand Ayatollah Ali al-Sistani in Mashhad.

== Death ==
Morvarid died on October 5, 2004, and was buried in the Imam Reza shrine. Iran's supreme leader Ali Khamenei expressed his condolences to the Morvarid family for Hasanali's demise.

== See also ==
- Hossein Borujerdi
- Mohammed Kadhim al-Modarresi
- Ali Khamenei
