= Sajjad al-Radhawi =

Pakistani-Iraqi Shia cleric and orator

Sayyid Sajjad al-Radhawi
- السيد سجاد الرضوي

Personal life
- Born: 1919 Lucknow, British Raj
- Died: March 26, 1970 (aged 50–51) Karbala, Iraq
- Resting place: Imam Husayn Shrine
- Parent: Muhammad-Mehdi al-Radhawi (father)

Religious life
- Religion: Islam
- Jurisprudence: Twelver Shia Islam

Sayyid Sajjad al-Radhawi (Arabic: سجاد الرضوي; Urdu: سجاد رضوى; 1919 – March 26, 1970) was a Pakistani-Iraqi Shia cleric and orator.

== Biography ==
al-Radhawi was born to Sayyid Muhammad-Mehdi bin Husayn bin Ali bin Ahmed bin Jawad bin Muhammad al-Radhawi in Lucknow, and shortly after migrated to Karbala along with his family.

He began his religious education at a young age. He studied his advanced studies under Sheikh Ali Akbar al-Na'ini, Mirza Mahdi al-Shirazi, Sheikh Muhammad-Ali Sibuwayh, and others.

He loved delivering religious sermons, and ended up becoming one of Karbalas leading orators. He began travelling frequently to different Asian countries, such as Iran, Pakistan and India. He also travelled to Africa, where he gave sermons, and participated in Islamic ecumenical discussions in al-Azhar, Mogadishu, and Aden. However, he fell ill with asthma and a heart condition, that made it difficult for him to lecture and deliver sermons frequently.

== Works ==
al-Radhawi had authored a number of books including:

- Nuzhat al-Nathireen
- Al-A'maal wal-Ad'iya wal-Ziyarat
- Hayat Sayyid al-Battha' Abi Talib (Alayhi al-Salam). On the life of Abu Talib.

== Personal life and death ==
al-Radhawi eventually succumbed to his illnesses and died on Thursday, March 26, 1970, in Karbala, and was buried in the Imam Husayn shrine.

He was survived by his sons, Abbas, a cleric and orator, that passed away whilst giving a sermon on the pulpit in Kuwait, in 2008; and Husayn, who is married to the daughter of late Ayatollah, Sayyid Muhammad-Kadhim al-Modarresi. His daughter was married to the son of late scholar and orator, Sayyid Mustafa al-Faizi, from the Tumah family.

== See also ==
- Hussainiya
- Mirza Mahdi al-Shirazi
