= Ali al-Milani =

Iraqi-Iranian Shia scholar (born 1948)

Ayatollah Sayyid Ali al-Husayni al-Milani
- السيد علي الحسيني الميلاني
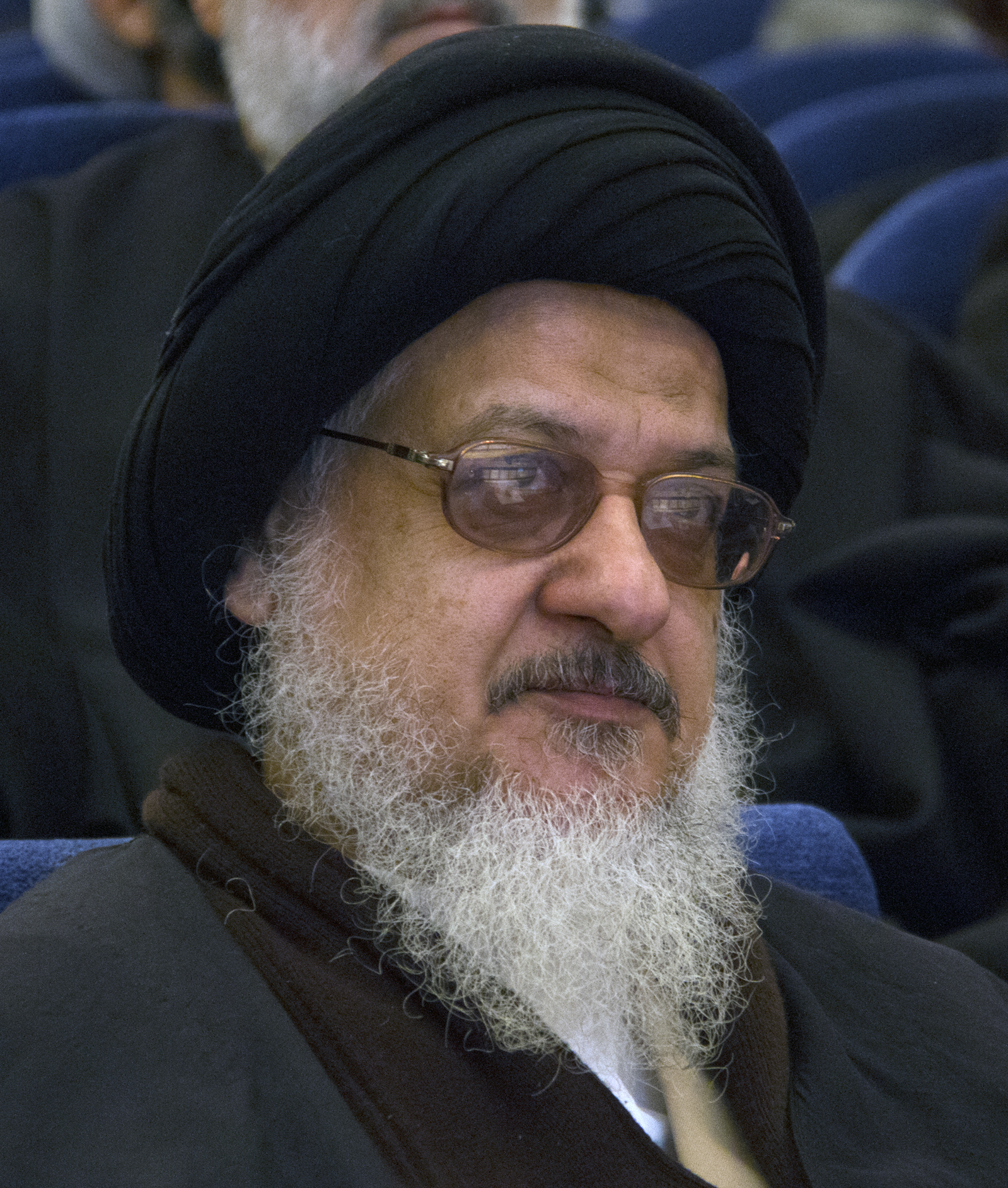

Personal life
- Born: 1948 (age 77–78) Najaf, Kingdom of Iraq
- Parent: Nur al-Din al-Milani (father)
- Relatives: Mohammad Hadi al-Milani (grandfather); Fadhil al-Milani (first cousin)
- Website: Official Website

Religious life
- Religion: Islam
- Denomination: Twelver Shīʿā

Ayatollah Sayyid Ali al-Husayni al-Milani (Arabic: علي الحسيني الميلاني; Persian: على حسينى ميلانى; b. July 1948) is an Iraqi-Iranian Shia scholar.

He is the founder of the Center for Islamic Facts in Qom. He is also the author of many books on the Islamic theology.

== Family ==
Al-Milani was born to a prominent religious family, that emigrated from Medina, and settled in Milan, Iran in the 14th century. Al-Milani's great ancestor was Ali al-Asghar, the son of the fourth Shia Imam, Ali Zayn al-Abideen.

== Early life and education ==
Al-Milani was born in Najaf in 1948. His father was Sayyid Nur al-Din al-Milani, an alem who used to occasionally lead the prayers at the Imam Husayn shrine. His grandfather was Grand Ayatollah Sayyid Mohammad Hadi Milani, a leading Shia scholar in Iraq and Iran.

Al-Milani studied in the Islamic seminary of Karbala, and Najaf. He studied under scholars like Sayyid Zain Al-Abidin al-Kashani, Sayyid Hassan al-Tabatabaei al-Qomi, Sheikh Muhammad Ali al-Ardebili, Sheikh Ali Muhammad al-Boroujerdi, Sayyid Nur al-Din Al-Milani, and Sayyid Abu Al-Qasim al-Khoei.

== Travel to Iran ==
He went to Iran on the orders of his grandfather, and he attended his research in Mashhad. He remained with his grandfather until he died in 1975. al-Milani then relocated to the city of Qom. He studied in Islamic jurisprudence and Principles of Islamic jurisprudence under scholars like Sayyid Mohammad-Reza Golpaygani, Sheikh Hossein Wahid Khorasani, Sheikh Kazem Tabrizi, Sheikh Murtadha al-Ha'eri, and Grand Ayatollah Sayyid Muhammad Rohani.

== Works ==
- The Promised Savior: An Inquiry Into The Imamate of Imam Mahdi (as) From The Viewpoint of Muslim Thinkers
- A Critical Assessment of Sahih Bukhari and Sahih Muslim
- A Critical Assessment of Umm Kulthum's Marriage to Umar
- A Distortion in Thaqalain Tradition
- Fabricated Traditions
- Ghadir as Narrated by Ahlul Bayt (a.s.)
- The Truth about the 'Companions'
- Prohibition of Two Lawful Pleasures: A Critical Assessment of Prohibition of Mut'a of Hajj and Mut'a Marriage

== See also ==
- Abbas Quchani
