= Mohammed Taqi Morvarid =

Iranian Shia cleric and politician (1921-2012)

Ayatollah Sheikh Muhammad-Taqi Morvarid
- شيخ محمد تقى مرواريد

Member of Assembly of Experts
- In office 15 December 1982 – 30 June 1990
- Constituency: Ilam province
- Majority: 367,496 (99.66%)

Personal details
- Born: 1921 Mashhad, Iran
- Died: 22 October 2012 (aged 90–91) Ilam, Iran
- Children: Muhammad-Reza Morvarid
- Title: Ayatollah

Personal life
- Education: Mashhad Seminary
- Relatives: Hasanali Morvarid (first cousin, once removed); Mohammed Kadhim al-Modarresi (cousin)

Religious life
- Religion: Islam
- Denomination: Twelver Shīʿā
- Jurisprudence: Ja'fari
- Creed: Usuli

Ayatollah Sheikh Muhammad-Taqi Morvarid (Persian: محمد تقى مرواريد; 1921 – 22 October 2012) was an Iranian Shia cleric and politician.He was a member of the first Assembly of Experts representing the Ilam province electorate. Morvarid won with 367,496 votes, a majority of 99.66%.

== Early life and education ==
Morvarid was born in Mashhad to the clerical Morvarid family, his father was Sheikh Ali Morvarid, son of Sheikh Ali-Akbar Morvarid. His mother was Halima Qodrati, daughter of Mulla Ali Qodrati. His brother, Ali-Asghar Morvarid was a prominent cleric and author. His cousin Sheikh Hasanali Morvarid was a renowned religious scholar. His great ancestor was renowned laureate and calligrapher Shihab al-Din Abdullah Morvarid (d. 1514).

=== Education ===
He carried out his primary seminary studies in Mashhad, under his grandfather Sheikh Ali-Akbar, and Sheikhs Hashim and Mujtaba Qazwini. He then travelled to Najaf and studied under Sayyid Abd al-A'la al-Sabziwari. He also travelled to Qom to continue his advanced seminary studies under Muhaqiq al-Damad, Sayyid Hossein Borujerdi, Sayyid Muhammad-Husayn Tabatabaei, Sheikh Wahid Khursani, Sheikh Husayn-Ali Montazeri, Mirza Jawad Tabrizi and Sheikh Ali Meshkini.

In November 1948, he began to deliver sermons across different cities in Iran.

== Personal life ==
Morvardi was married and had three sons. His son Muhammad-Reza Morvardi was the governor of Ilam in 2013–2017.

== See also ==
- Assembly of Experts
- Ali Meshkini
- Mohammed Kadhim al-Modarresi
