= Muhsin al-Qazwini =

Sayyid Muhsin al-Qazwini
- السيد محسن القزويني
- Born: 1952 (age 73–74); Karbala, Iraq
- Citizenship: Iraqi
- Education: Islamische Universität Imam al-Auzāʿī (MA) (PhD); University of Baghdad (BA)
- Occupation: Professor
- Notable work: The State of the Messenger (1992); Law by Imam Ali (1973); Economics in Nahj al-Balagha (1997); The Revolution of Imam Husayn (2000)
- Parent: Baqir al-Qazwini (father)
- Relatives: Murtadha al-Qazwini (first cousin, once removed)

Muhsin Baqir al-Musawi al-Qazwini (Arabic: محسن باقر الموسوي القزويني; b. 1952) is an Iraqi author, politician, essayist, college professor, and founder of the Ahl al-Bayt University in Karbala.

== Early life and education ==
al-Qazwini was born in Karbala, hailing from the prominent religious al-Qazwini family. His father, Sayyid Baqir al-Qazwini was a cleric. His mother is from the Arab Shammar tribe.

=== Education ===
He grew up in Iraq, and gained his bachelor's degree in 1974 from the Osol Aldeen College in the University of Baghdad. With rising pressures from the Baathist regime, he immigrated to Kuwait in 1975, and then to Iran in 1977. He then moved to Lebanon, and gained his masters and doctorate from the Islamic University of Imam al-Auzai in Beirut in 1992 and 1995.

=== Return to Iraq ===
al-Qazwini returned to Iraq after the 2003 invasion of Iraq. In 2004, he became a member of the Coalition Provisional Authority and in 2005, he became a member on the board of writing the constitution.

== Ahl al-Bayt University ==
al-Qazwini sought to start an Islamic university, and did so by initiating a virtual university on the internet in 2000 as the Ahl Al Bayt International University. After the 2003 invasion of Iraq, al-Qazwini moved back Karbala, and at the Ministry of Higher Education's discretion, he managed to purchase a building and establish the university on the ground. In 2007, al-Qazwini purchased a plot of land sized at 7000 m^{2}, that was 4 kilometres from the shrine of Imam Hussein, and built a second branch for the university. This moved allowed a wider expansion for the university and saw the opening of many more faculties.

== Works ==
=== Books ===
al-Qazwini has published 16 books, some of these include:

- Law by Imam Ali (1973)
- The State of the Messenger (1992)
- Economics in Nahj al-Balagha (1997)
- The Revolution of Imam Husayn (2000)

=== Papers ===
al-Qazwini has had more than 30 scientific and research papers on Islamic sciences, laws and politics published.

== See also ==
- Ahl al-Bayt University
- al-Qazwini family
- Nahj al-Balagha
