= Ali Akbar al-Modarresi =

Shia Iranian-Iraqi scholar and teacher

Ayatollah Sayyid Ali-Akbar al-Modarresi
- السيد علي أكبر الحسيني المدرسي

Personal life
- Born: September 17, 1957 (age 68) Karbala, Iraq
- Children: Muhammed-Ridha
- Parent: Mohammed Kadhim al-Modarresi (father)
- Relatives: Mirza Mahdi al-Shirazi (grandfather); Mohammad Taqi al-Modarresi (brother); Hadi al-Modarresi (brother); Muhammad al-Shirazi (maternal uncle); Baqir al-Qazwini (father-in-law); Abd al-A'la al-Sabziwari (uncle-in-law)

Religious life
- Religion: Islam
- Denomination: Twelver Shīʿā

Muslim leader
- Students: Nimr al-Nimr Mohammed Ridha al-Shirazi Rasheed al-Husayni

Ayatollah Sayyid Ali-Akbar al-Husayni al-Modarresi (Persian: على أكبر حسينى مدرسى; Arabic: علي أكبر الحسيني المدرسي; b. 17 September 1957) is a Shia Iranian-Iraqi scholar and teacher. He is the brother of grand Ayatollah Sayyid Muhammad-Taqi al-Modarresi.

Al-Modarresi is a teacher at the religious seminary of Mashhad.

== Family ==
Al-Modarresi was born into a distinguished Shia religious family in Karbala in Iraq. His father is Ayatollah Sayyid Muhammad-Kadhim al-Modarresi, the grandson of grand Ayatollah Sayyid Muhammad-Baqir Golpayegani (also known as Jorfadiqani). His mother is the daughter of grand Ayatollah Sayyid Mehdi al-Shirazi. He claims descent from Zayd ibn Ali (died c. 740 AD), the great-great-grandson of the Islamic prophet, Muhammad.

== Religious career ==
Al-Modarresi studied in the religious seminaries of Karbala, under his father, Sayyid Muhammad-Kadhim and brother Sayyid Muhammad-Taqi, as well as senior scholars such as Shaykh Muhammad-Husayn al-Mazindarani, Shaykh Jafar al-Rushti, and his maternal uncles Sayyid Muhammad al-Shirazi and Sayyid Hassan al-Shirazi. He emigrated to Kuwait with his older brothers in 1971, due to the Bathists anti-Shia sentiment. They settled there until 1979, after which they moved to Iran after the Islamic Revolution.

Al-Modarresi taught in al-Qaim seminary, which was established by his brother Muhammad-Taqi, in 1980, until it was closed down in 1990. He remained in Tehran whilst his brothers went to Syria, teaching in different religious seminaries, until he moved to Mashhad in 2014, and began teaching at its seminary, near the shrine of Imam al-Ridha.

During his time in al-Qaim, al-Modarresi taught distinguished Saudi activist Nimr al-Nimr and was considered as his mentor. He had a close relationship with him even after the closure of the seminary, until his execution in 2016. In al-Qaim, he also taught Sayyid Rasheed al-Husayni, a representative of grand Ayatollah Sayyid Ali al-Sistani, who appears on Iraqi state television and delivers the fatwas of al-Sistani.

== Personal life ==
Al-Modarresi is married to the daughter of Sayyid Baqir al-Qazwini, and has seven children.

== See also ==
- Mirza Mahdi al-Shirazi
- Mohammed Taqi al-Modarresi
- Nimr al-Nimr
