= Mohammad Hadi al-Milani =

Iraqi Grand Ayatollah (1895–1975)

Grand Ayatollah Sayyid Muhammad-Hadi al-Milani
- السيد محمد هادي الحسيني الميلاني
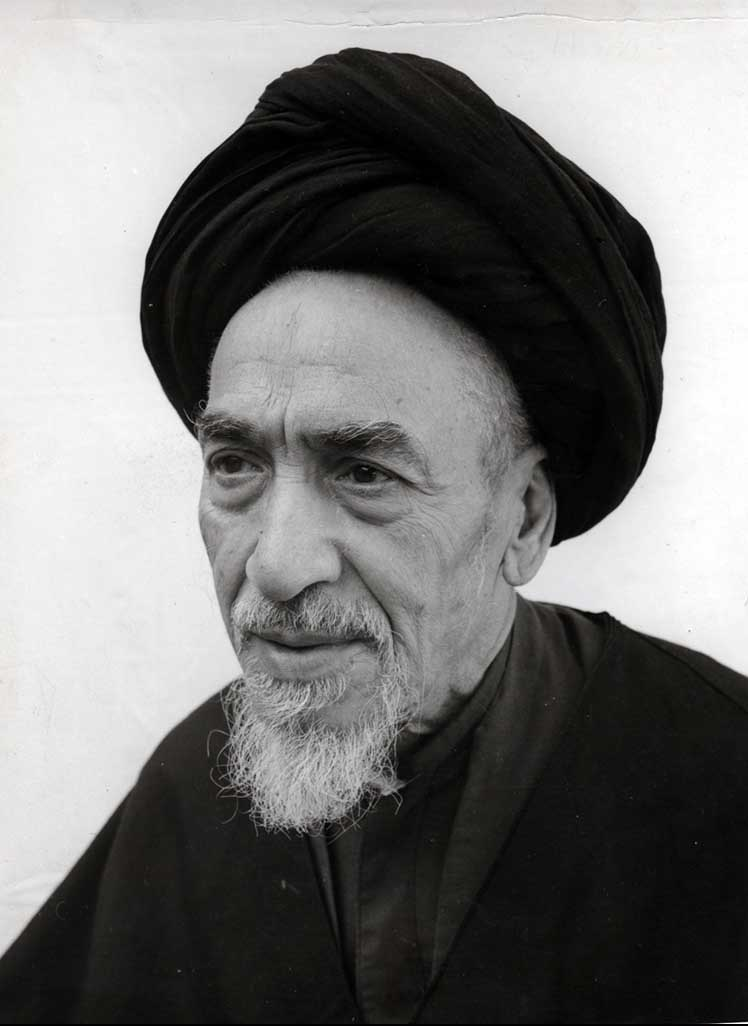
- Title: Grand Ayatollah

Personal life
- Born: 1 July 1895 Najaf, Baghdad Vilayet, Ottoman Iraq
- Died: 7 August 1975 (aged 80) Iranian Mashhad, Imperial State of Iran
- Resting place: Imam Reza Shrine
- Children: Nur al-Din; Abbas; Muhammad-Ali
- Parent(s): Jafar al-Milani (father); Bibi Khanum Mamaqani (mother)
- Relatives: Mohammad Hasan Mamaqani (grandfather); Fadhil al-Milani (grandson); Ali al-Milani (grandson)

Religious life
- Religion: Islam
- Denomination: Twelver Shīʿā

Grand Ayatollah Sayyid Mohammad Hadi Milani (Arabic: محمد هادي الحسيني الميلاني; Persian: محمد هادى حسينى ميلانى; 1 July 1895 – 7 August 1975) was an Iranian-Iraqi marja'.

Al-Milani was also active in political and social affairs. When he moved to Mashhad, the Islamic seminary of Mashhad flourished. He contributed to the establishment of many Islamic seminary schools across Iran.

After the death of Hossein Borujerdi in 1961, al-Milani was considered to be among Iran's leading grand Ayatollahs, along with Mohammad Kazem Shariatmadari and Ruhollah Khomeini. He also taught Ali Khamenei, Iran's former supreme leader.

== Lineage ==
Al-Milani was born to a prominent religious family, that emigrated from Medina, and settled in Milan, West Azerbaijan, in the 14th century. He was descended from the fourth Shia Imam, Ali ibn Husayn Zayn al-Abidin, whose grandfather Ali was Muhammad's cousin.

== Early life and education ==
=== Early life ===
Al-Milani was born to Sayyid Jafar al-Milani (d. 1907) and Bibi Khanum Mamaqani, in Najaf, Ottoman Iraq. Both of his parents were ulama. He was the eldest of three sons and three daughters. Both of his brothers, Musa al-Milani and Kadhim al-Milani were merchants. His father died when he was sixteen years old, and al-Milani was taken in by his uncle and to-be father-in-law Sheikh Abdallah Mamaqani.

=== Education ===
Al-Milani grew up in Najaf and was educated in its seminary. He studied under scholars like Mirza al-Hamadani, Sheikh Hasan Tabrizi and Sheikh Ali al-Irawani. He studied philosophy under Sheikh Husayn Badkubehi and Sheikh Muhammad-Hassan al-Gharawi. He studied akhlaq under Sayyid Ali al-Qadhi and Abd al-Ghafar al-Mazindrani. He studied debate and Quranic exegesis under Sheikh Muhammad-Jawad al-Balaghi. He studied the dissertation in advanced seminars under Sheikh Dhiya al-Din al-Iraqi.

He was invited to reside in Karbala at the invitation of Hossein Tabatabaei Qomi, and so he moved there in 1936, and remained there for just under two decades. After the death of Qomi in 1947, al-Milani, alongside Mirza Mahdi al-Shirazi and Mirza Muhammad-Hadi al-Khurasani, were considered the highest ranking jurists in Karbala.

He was granted ijaza of ruwaya (narrating) from Sayyid Hasan al-Sadr, Abd al-Husayn Sharaf al-Din, Abbas al-Qomi and Agha Buzurq al-Tehrani.

== Travel to Mashhad ==
In 1953, he travelled to Mashhad, to visit the Imam Reza shrine. He then decided to remain in Mashhad, at the request of its notable religious figures, who gathered and signed a petition for this. After moving to Mashhad, he became the head of the religious seminary and the Imam of the Goharshad mosque inside the shrine.

Al-Milani founded numerous Islamic schools, such as the Haqqani Seminary and Imam al-Sadiq Seminary. He revolutionised the structure and organisation of the seminaries and introduced new training programmes. Propagation of religious teachings were of utmost importance for al-Milani, and so he would send his students as missionaries to different areas, cities and villages across Iran.

There were approximately four hundred advanced students of the seminary who had attended his lectures.

Al-Milani sponsored Islamic institutes and organisations that did not just belong to the Shia seminaries, such as the Center for the Propagation of Islamic Truths which contributed to the propagation of modern Islamic thoughts and responses to objections, made by anti-Islamic movements, that were popular among the educated class of Mashhad at the time, from the 1940s to the 1970s.

== Political activism ==
Al-Milani was active during the Iraqi revolt against British presence, in 1920.

In Iran, he was active in the 1963 demonstrations in Qom, pioneering the clerical movement, and harshly criticised the Shah for his murderous actions.

Al-Milani supported Khomeini during the capitulation treaty in 1964, supporting the sentiment that the treaty was “a document pointing to the slavery of the Iranian nation”.

In 1967, he published a statement regarding the six-day war between the Arab nations and Israel. In this statement, he sympathised with the Muslim Arabs, and because of this, he was threatened by General Nassiri. In the same year, his passport was confiscated and he was ordered to leave Iran because he did not congratulate the Shah for his coronation, but the decision was not executed because of al-Milani's spiritual influence among people and his place among Shiite clergies and authorities.

== Personal life ==
Al-Milani was married to two women. His first marriage was to his cousin, the daughter of Sheikh Abdallah Al-Mamaqani, and from her he had two sons (Nur al-Din and Abbas) and one daughter. His wife was highly attached to Najaf, and when al-Milani moved to Mashhad, she remained.

Al-Milani's second marriage was to the daughter of Sayyid Hasan Al-Musawi Al-Jazayeri. From her he had one son.

== Works and students ==
Al-Milani has a number of publications including:

- Qadatona Kayfa Na'rifahum (Our Leaders, How We Know Them)
- Tafsir Surat al-Jum'a wa al-Taghabun (Exegesis of al-Juma and al-Taghabun Quranic Chapters)
- Mi'at Wa Ashr As'ila (A Hundred and Ten Questions)
- Hashiya Ala al-Urwat al-Withqa (A Brief Notation of the Indissoluble Link)
- Mukhtasar al-Ahkam (Religious Laws in Brief)

His most notable students were:

- Sheikh al-Wahid al-Khurasani
- Sheikh Muhammad-Ridha al-Mothafar
- Sayyid Yusuf al-Hakim
- Sayyid Ibrahim Alam al-Huda
- Sayyid Ali Khamenei

== See also ==
- Mohammad Hasan Mamaqani
- Mohammad Kazem Shariatmadari
- Ali Khamenei
