= Ahl al-Bayt University =

Private university in Karbala, Iraq

Coordinates: 32°38′28.9″N 43°59′40.5″E

- جامعة أهل البيت
- Motto: باسم أهل البيت صرحٌ شامخٌ يطوي الزَّمانا
- Motto in English: "In the name of the Ahl al-Bayt, this high structure transcends time" (Arabic)
- Type: Private research university
- Established: 2000
- Chancellor: Muhsin al-Qazwini
- Head: Abbas Husayn Jawad
- Students: 7,320 (2018/19)
- Undergraduates: 6,309 (2018/19)
- Postgraduates: 1,011 (2018/19)
- Location: Karbala, Iraq
- Website: abu.edu.iq

Ahl Al Bayt University is a private Iraqi university established in 2003 in Karbala, Iraq by Dr. Muhsin Baqir al-Qazwini.

The university was first initiated as a virtual university appearing on the internet in 2000 as the Ahl Al Bayt International University, and it taught Management, Law, Arabic Literature and Islamic law. Whilst the university was virtual, it had offices in different cities like London, Beirut, Kuwait, Damascus and Manama, for students to go and take their mid-term and final exams.

After the 2003 invasion of Iraq, the founder of the university moved back to Iraq and settled in Karbala. Over there he established the university with the Ministry of Higher Education, and it gained the agreement from the minister Dr. Abdul Razzaq al-Aswad in 2004.

The university started with three colleges: College of Law, Islamic Sciences, Arts. In 2007, Dr. al-Qazwini purchased a 7000 m² land near the old amusement park in Karbala, 4 kilometers from the shrine of Imam Hussein. This allowed a wider expansion for the university and saw the opening of more faculties.

The university seeks to raise the level of education up to that of developed countries in terms of scientific sobriety and to achieve quantum leaps in performance levels and reach international standards.

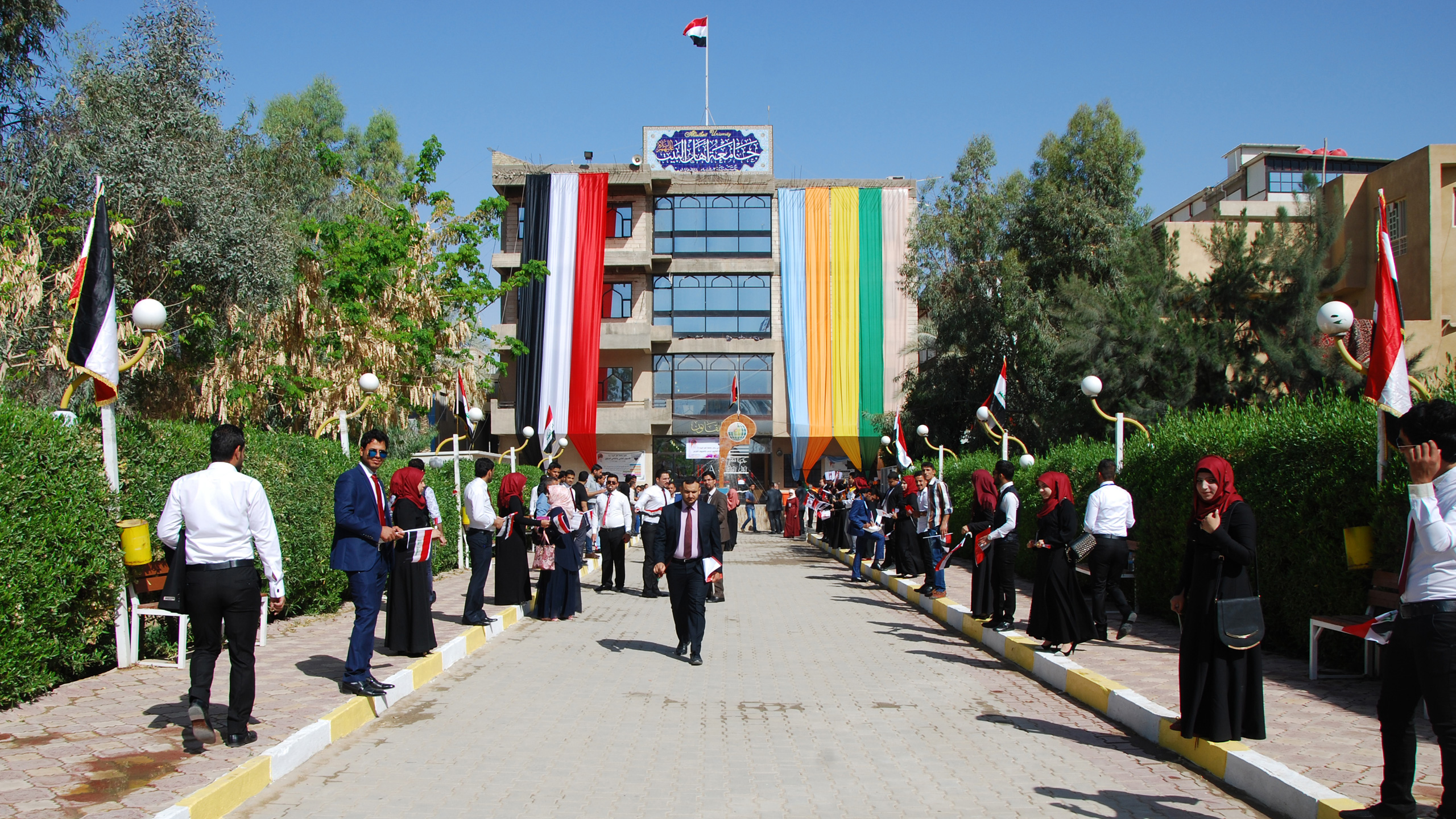
Ahl Al Bayt University, Karbala, Iraq

== Faculties ==
- Faculty of Law
- Faculty of Arts
- Faculty of Islamic Sciences
- Faculty of Pharmacy
- Faculty of Medical & Health Technologies
- Faculty of Dentistry

== See also ==
- List of universities in Iraq
