= Mohammad Hasan Mamaqani =

Grand Ayatollah Sheikh Mohammad Hasan al-Mamaqani
- الشيخ محمد حسن المامقاني

Personal life
- Born: 1822 Najaf, Iraq
- Died: March 15, 1905 (aged 82–83) Karbala, Iraq
- Resting place: Imam Husayn Shrine
- Children: Bibi Khanum
- Relatives: Mohammad Hadi al-Milani (grandson)

Religious life
- Religion: Islam
- Creed: Shi'a Twelver

Mohammad Hasan Mamaqani (Arabic: محمد حسن المامقاني; 1822–March 15, 1905) was a leading mujtahid of Najaf in the 19th century. He was born and educated in Najaf . He studied with the highest religious authority of his time, Morteza Ansari. His daughter and her son became renowned scholars in their own right, Bibi Khanum (d. 1950) and Mohammad Hadi al-Milani (d. 1975).

He is buried under the iwan of the Husayn shrine.

== See also ==
- Grand Ayatollah Mohammad Hadi Milani
- Grand Ayatollah Mohammad Kazem Shariatmadari
