= Rebecca Masterton =

British Islamic studies scholar

- Education: BA, MA, PhD
- Occupations: Islamic studies scholar, author academic
- Television: Press TV, Ahlulbayt TV, HadiTV, Sahar TV

Rebecca Masterton is a British Shia Islamic scholar, author and television presenter.

== Early life ==
Masterton was born to a Christian family. She converted to Islam in 1999 and became a Shia Muslim in 2003. She moved to London at the age of eighteen. She attended the School of Oriental and African Studies London, and received a BA in Japanese, an MA in Comparative East Asian and African Literature, and a PhD in francophone and Islamic mystical literature of West Africa.

== Career ==
Masterton's academic work focuses on West African Sufism, Shia spirituality, colonialism, and modernity. She has previously taught at Birkbeck College and the University of London.

She has appeared on Iranian Islamic media programs by Sahar TV, Press TV, HadiTV, and on the British Shia broadcaster Ahlulbayt TV.

Masterton is also a senior lecturer at The Islamic College in London.

She has also published her book of short stories Passing Through the Dream... To the Other Side.

== Works ==
=== Books ===
- Shī‘ī Spirituality for the Twenty-First Century (London: Light Reading, 2020)
- Passing Through the Dream... To the Other Side. (Light Reading, 2008) ISBN 978-0955934407

Translations

- The Moral World of the Qur’an, by M. A. Draz, translated from French
- The Inner Dimensions of Hajj, by Zohreh Borujerdi, translated from Persian

=== Articles ===
- A comparative exploration of the spiritual authority of the awliyā' in the Shi'ī and Sūfī traditions with reference to the works of the Dhahabī Order and Allamah Tabataba'i
- Walayah as a Response to the Self-Other Dichotomy in European Philosophy
- Islamic Mystical Resonances in Fulbe Literature
- Islamic Mystical Readings of Cheikh Hamidou Kane's Ambiguous Adventure
- A Critical Comparison of Cosmic Hierarchies in the Development of Christian and Islamic Mystical Theology
