= Al-Shahristani family =

House of Shahristani آل الشهرستاني Shahristanis
- Founded: 1774; 252 years ago in Karbala
- Founder: Muhammad-Mehdi al-Shahristani

The family of al-Shahristani (Arabic: آل الشهرستاني, romanized: ʾĀl al-Shahristānī), also transliterated in a number of other ways, including al-Shehristani or al-Shahrestani, are an Iraqi-Iranian clerical Shia family that settled in Karbala from the village of Shahristan, near Isfahan, in the late 18th century.

The family rose to prominence in Iraq in the late 19th century. Members of the family are notable for being Ayatollahs in Karbala. However, in more recent times, the family has become more academic, and political, with its most notable politician being Iraqi statesman, Hussain al-Shahristani.

The family claim agnatic descent from Muhammad's daughter Fatimah, carrying the honorific title of Sayyid, through the seventh Shia Imam, Imam Musa al-Kadhim, making them a Musawi family. They are not to be mistaken with the Husaynid Karbalaei family of al-Shahristani, who married into the Musawi family, intertwining the two families.

== History and lineage ==
The al-Shahristani family is an intellectual clerical family. Its patriarch is Sayyid Muhammad-Mehdi al-Shahristani, who was born in Shahristan, Isfahan in 1717. He emigrated from his hometown, to Karbala, where he settled in 1774. He studied under the allamah al-Wahid al-Behbehani, Sheikh Yusuf al-Bahrani, and Sheikh Muhammad-Mehdi al-Futuni, and was granted an ijaza from them, and became a marja'. He purchased a home north of the Imam Husayn shrine, and his home later became known as the dewan of House Shahristani. Sayyid Muhammad-Mehdi was the first from this family to migrate to Karbala, after his ancestor Sayyid Jalal al-Din Muhammad, known as amir al-nitham (transl. prince of order), had previously resided in Karbala in the 16th century, but migrated to Iran. He opened a library, that was named after him, and was known to have valuable books and manuscripts. It also had his famous works, such as al-Fathalik Fi Sharh al-Madarik, and al-Misbah. The library was however destroyed during the Wahabi sack of Karbala.

Sayyid Muhammad-Mehdi al-Shahristani died in 1801, and his son Sayyid Muhammad-Husayn al-Shahristani, known as agha buzurg (transl. great lord), who participated in the Battle of Menakhur in 1826, took the reins from his father. He died of the plague in 1831 and was buried in the southern rawaq (transl. hallway) of the Imam Husayn shrine precinct, behind the martyrs' tomb, that later became the family crypt.

The lineage of the al-Shahristani family is as follows:

Muḥammad-Mehdī bin Abu al-Qāsim bin Ruḥullāh bin Ḥasan bin Rafiʿ al-Dīn Muḥammad al-Sadr bin Jalāl al-Dīn Muḥammad (Amir al-Nitham) bin Zayn al-Dīn ʿAli bin Sadr al-Dīn Ismaʿīl bin Alaʿ al-Din al-Ḥusayn bin Muʿin al-Din bin Rukn al-Dīn al-Ḥusayn bin Ashraf bin Rukn al-Dīn Ḥasan bin Ashraf bin Nur al-Dīn Muḥammad bin Abu al-Ḥasan al-Muḥaddith bin Tahir bin Ḥusayn al-Qat'ī bin Musa Abu Sibḥa bin Ibrahīm al-Asghar bin Musa al-Kādhim bin Jaʿfar as-Sādiq bin Muḥammad al-Bāqir bin ʿAli al-Sajjad bin Ḥusayn al-Shahid bin ʿAli Ibna Abi Talib.

== Notable members ==
=== First generation ===
- Muhammad-Mehdi al-Shahristani (1717–1801) was the son of Abu al-Qasim al-Shahristani. He was a marja' and known as one of the four Mehdis (they were himself, Mehdi Bahrululoom, Mehdi al-Naraqi, and Mehdi al-Khurasani) as they were the most notable students of al-Wahid al-Behbehani.

=== Second generation ===
- Abu al-Qasim al-Shahristani was the son of Muhammad-Mehdi al-Shahristani. He was a respectable jurist, and died shortly after his father's death.
- Muhammad-Husayn al-Shahristani (died 1831) was the son of Muhammad-Mehdi al-Shahristani. He was a marja' like his father, and was dubbed Agha Buzurg, a title signifying his great intellect. He married the granddaughter of al-Wahid al-Behbehani, through his son Muhammad-Ali al-Kirmanshahi al-Behbehani.

=== Third generation ===
- Muhammad-Jafar al-Shahristani (died 1844) was the son of Muhammad-Husayn al-Shahristani. He was a notable cleric in Karbala. His works included studies in allowing the following of the dead [jurist], forbidding singing, the laws of grape juice, the occultation, the lineage of al-Wahid al-Behbehani. He was buried in the al-Shahristani crypt in the Imam Husayn shrine.
- Salih al-Shahristani (died 1891) was the son of Muhammad-Husayn al-Shahristani. He was a senior jurist, that gained the respect of the supreme Shia cleric of the time, Mirza Shirazi, who upon the death of Salih in 1891, mourned him for four consecutive days in Samarra.
- Abbas al-Shahristani (1803–1883) was the son of Muhammad-Husayn al-Shahristani. He was a jurist, and gained ijtihad from Sheikh Murtadha al-Ansari whilst studying in Najaf. He was buried in the al-Shahristani crypt in the Imam Husayn shrine.

=== Fourth generation ===
- Ibrahim al-Shahristani (1883–1957) was the son of Salih al-Shahristani. He was a cleric, and socialite in Karbala.
- Muhammad-Mehdi al-Shahristani (died 1915) was the son of Salih al-Shahristani. He was a cleric. He was buried in the family crypt in the Imam Husayn shrine.

=== Fifth generation ===
- Muhammad al-Shahristani (died 1915) was the son of Muhammad-Mehdi al-Shahristani. He was writer and poet. His works included an entire diwan in Farsi, and a study in Arabic literature. He was buried in the family's crypt in the Imam Husayn shrine.
- Salih al-Shahristani (1907–1975) was the son of Ibrahim al-Shahristani. He was an author, researcher, and diplomat. He migrated to Tehran in the 1930s, and served in the Iraqi embassy in Tehran, then later the Jordanian embassy. He died in Tehran, and his corpse was transferred to Karbala, to be buried in the family crypt.
- Hussain al-Shahristani (born 1942) is the son of Ibrahim al-Shahristani. He is a politician and nuclear scientist. He served as Iraqi minister of Energy, Foreign Affairs, and Higher Education and Scientific Research. He also served as deputy to the prime minister of Iraq, Nouri al-Maliki.

=== Sixth generation ===
- Muhammad-Ali al-Shahristani (1932–2011) was the son of Muhammad-Salih, son of Mirza Ali, son of Salih al-Shahristani. He was an industrial engineer, and the founder of the International Colleges of Islamic Science in London. He participated in many engineering projects that involved the Shia holy shrines. He was buried in the family crypt in the Imam Husayn shrine.

== See also ==
- Al-Qazwini family
- Al-Modarresi family
