= Baqir al-Irawani =

Iraqi Ayatollah

Ayatollah Sheikh Muhammad-Baqir al-Irawani
- الشيخ محمد باقر الإيرواني
- Title: Ayatollah

Personal life
- Born: 1949 (age 76–77) Najaf, Iraq
- Parent: Muhammad-Taqi al-Irawani

Religious life
- Religion: Islam
- Denomination: Twelver Shīʿā

Ayatollah Sheikh Muhammad-Baqir al-Irawani (Arabic: محمد باقر الإيرواني; born 1949) is an Iraqi Shia scholar, religious authority, and poet.

Al-Irawani is considered as one of the strong nominees for the grand religious authority in Najaf after grand Ayatollah, Sayyid Ali al-Sistani.

== Early life and religious career ==
Al-Irawani was born in Najaf in 1949 to Sheikh Muhammad-Taqi al-Irawani, a descendant of grand Ayatollah Sheikh Muhammad al-Irawani, known as al-Fadhil al-Irawani, who was a student of Sheikh Muhammad-Hasan al-Najafi, and Sheikh Murtadha al-Ansari.

He grew up in Najaf, and completed his primary, and secondary academic studies in the Publication Forum schools that was supervised by a number of scholars, including Sheikh Muhammad-Ridha al-Mothafar.

He then joined the religious seminary in Najaf, and after completing his preliminary studies, went on to study bahth kharij (advanced seminars) under the two grand Ayatollahs, Sayyid Abu al-Qasim al-Khoei, and Sayyid Muhammad-Baqir al-Sadr. He attended the principles of Islamic jurisprudence of Sayyid Ali al-Sistani, and Sayyid Muhammad-Sa'eed al-Hakim.

Al-Irawani taught in the Najaf seminary, sutooh 'ulya (advanced intermediate studies) until he emigrated from Iraq.

Towards the end of the Iran-Iraq war, al-Irawani migrated to Qom and continued to teach the sutooh 'ulya. Five years later, he taught principles and jurisprudence in advanced levels, and completed a ten-year course.

He returned to Iraq after the US invasion of Iraq, and resided in his hometown, teaching in the Imam Ali shrine, as well as other religious seminaries in Najaf.

== Works ==
Al-Irawani authored a number of books that were transcripts from different classes he attended and taught. These included:

- al-Isloob al-Thani lil Halqa al-Thalitha. Four volumes of explanatory work of Sayyid Muhammad-Baqir Sadrs principles of jurisprudence lessons.
- Durus Tamheediya fi al-Fiqh al-Istidlali. Three volumes of a course on ratiocination in a new method. Considered an alternative to al-Shahid al-Thani's al-Rawḍa al-bahīyya.
- Durus Tamheediya fi al-Qawa'id al-Rijaliya. A series of lectures on the science of narrators.

He also worked on an alternative book to Sheikh al-Ansari's Makasib, and has completed the book of purity, and prayer, and they are taught in the religious seminary's of Qom.

Al-Irawani also writes poetry, and some of his poetry includes:

- Karbala Huffat Li Karbin wa Balaa'. A poem commemorating the death anniversary of Imam Husayn.

(كربلا) حُفّت بكربٍ وبلا
نذكرُ الـسـبـطَ بها في كلِ حينْ
لـيـلـةُ الـعـاشرِ ما مِنْ ليلةٍ
مـثـلُـهـا مرّت على مرِّ السنينْ

Translation:

Karbala, riddled with trials and tribulations.
We remember the grandson [of the prophet].
The eve of the tenth, was not a single night,
Like it, it passed through all these years.

- Hellel al-Shi'ru fi al-Madeehi wa Kabbar. A poem commemorating the birth anniversary of Fatima Masumah.

هلّل الشِعرُ في المَديحِ وكبَّرْ
مَلأ الكَونُ بالثَنَاءِ المُعطَّر
طَفَحَتْ مَوجةُ الشعورِ اِنْطِلاقاً
مِن صَميمِ الوَلاءِ أصلاً ومَصْدرْ

Translation:

Poetry rejoices and sings,
Filling the universe with its fragranced songs.
The waves of emotions surface,
From the source of faith and loyalty.

- Madarisuna Bakat Limudarisiha. A chronogrammatic poem mourning the passing of Sayyid Muhammad-Kadhim al-Modarresi

مدَارِسُنا بكَت لمدرِّسيها
وتنعى بالأسى طولَ الزمانِ
...
يُجيبُك منطقُ التاريخِ (عنه
مُحمّدُ كاظمٍ هُوَ في الجِنانِ)

Translation:

Our seminaries weep for its teacher,
And will mourn him forever.
...
History's logic records (of him
Muhammad-Kadhim is in the heavens)

The verse in brackets has a numerical value of 1414 (the hijri year for 1994).

== See also ==
- Hawza Najaf
