= Mahdi al-Modarresi =

Muslim cleric born 1977

Sayyid Mahdi Modarresi
- السيد مهدي الحسيني المدرسي
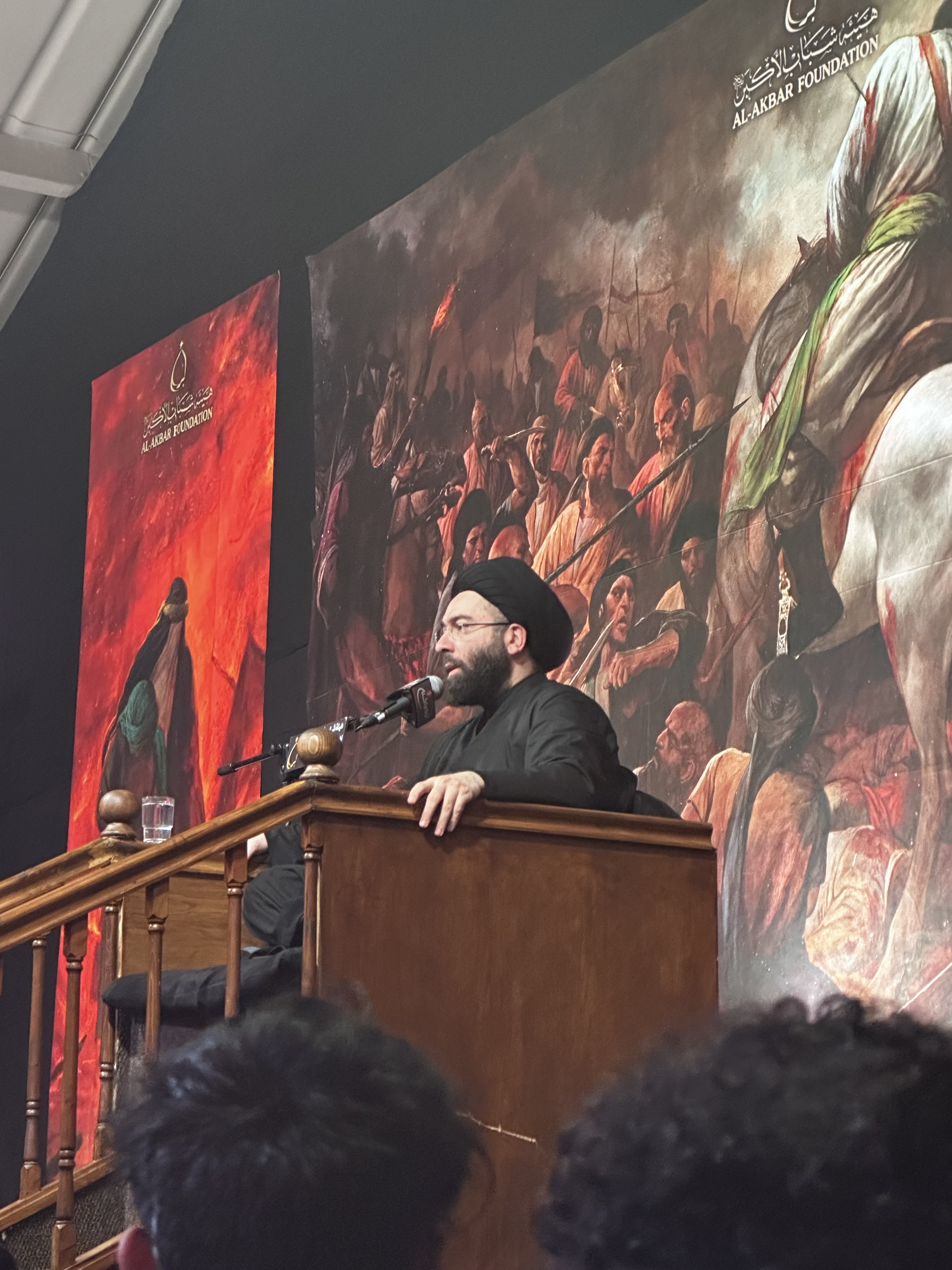
- Modarresi giving a speech in London during Muharram 2023.

Personal life
- Born: 1977 (age 48–49) Kuwait
- Parent: Hadi al-Modarresi (father)
- Relatives: Mohammad Taqi al-Modarresi (uncle); Ali Akbar al-Modarresi (uncle); Murtadha al-Qazwini (great uncle)

Religious life
- Religion: Shia
- Jurisprudence: Twelver Shia
- Website: Official website

Sayyid Muhammad-Mahdi al-Modarresi (Arabic: محمد مهدي المدرسي; born 1977) also known as Sayed Mahdi Modarresi, is an Iraqi-Australian Shia scholar, author and orator. He hails from a clerical family which includes his uncle, Grand Ayatollah, Muhammed-Taqi al-Modarresi, one of Iraq's leading faith leaders of its majority Shia population.

He has led prayers at the United States House of Representatives, and delivers lectures around the world. Modarresi leads Interpath, an outreach program to strengthen ties between Muslims and other major faith traditions.

== Early life and education ==
Modarresi was born in Kuwait in 1977. From his father's side, he is the son of Hadi al-Modarresi, and great-grandson of Mirza Mahdi al-Shirazi. From his mother's side he is the grandson of Hashim al-Qazwini, and the great-grandson of Muhammad-Sadiq al-Qazwini. He claims descent from Muhammad, through Ali Ibn al-Husayn from his father's side, and Musa al-Kadhim, from his mother's side.

Under his father's supervision, Modarresi followed a solid traditional curriculum in the hawza, studying classical works on various disciplines of Islamic jurisprudence as well as the ancillary faculties commonly taught at religious learning institutions. A graduate of the acclaimed al-Qaim Theological Research Institute at the Sayyidah Zaynab Mosque in Damascus, Modarresi reached the level of sotouh al ulya (upper foundations). His classical curriculum embodied a methodology which crystallizes the middle way of Islam; respect for the differences between jurists, and a spiritual education drawn from the Qur'an and the traditions of Muhammad and his household, the Ahlulbayt.

He also undertook his early academic education in the United States, finally studying sociology, politics, and philosophy at tertiary level in Australia.

== Activism ==
Modarresi has criticised the atrocities committed by the Bahraini government against its people (namely the Shia), especially after the uprising of 2011. He believed that the country's mass uprising, was the result of many decades of abuse. Modarresi was also agitated by the West's silence to the situation in Bahrain, and writes in one his articles:

"Whether western leaders decide to cut their losses or keep the Bahraini government on life support for the time being, by far the worst thing they can do is bury their heads in the sand and assume everything is going to be all right... Imagine the consequences if the western powers had sided with the Hosni Mubarak regime or that of Colonel Gaddafi until the very end... Had it not been for Saudi military support and the West's political backing, the truth is that this unelected Al Khalifa regime would have collapsed long ago" Modarresi has also criticised Saudi Arabia and Al Saud for its human right's violations, and even so as to compare the regime to ISIS, claiming the only real difference between ISIS and the Saudi regime is that the latter has 'made it', having secured a seat at the UN and employ an army of flamboyant diplomats and lobbyists roaming the corridors of Westminster Palace and Capitol Hill.

== Works ==
Modarresi published his first Arabic title in 1992, titled, "About the Signs of God and His Greatness". He later authored two more books in Arabic that were published in Beirut. His last Arabic book was an in-depth analytical study of the prophetic narration known as Hadith al-Thaqalayn, which looks into the practical implications of this controversial narration and provides a thorough insight of the Shia-Sunni deliberations on this text.

In the second decade of 2000, Modarresi shifted his attention to writing in English, and has authored or edited several books, including:

- Al-Modarresi, Grand Ayatollah (23 July 2015). Hajj: Rules and Rituals. CreateSpace Independent Publishing Platform. ISBN 978-1515186021.
- Modarresi, Sayed Mahdi (14 September 2015). Our Beliefs: The Fundamental Tenets of Islam. Amazon Digital Services LLC - KDP Print US. ISBN 978-0994240934.
- The Lost Testament: What Christians Don't Know About Jesus. ASIN B01K170MDQ.
- A Day Like No Other: The Saga of Hussein and History's Greatest Tragedy. ISBN 979-8852910257.
- The Maqtal of Hussein: Passion Narrative of History's Greatest Tragedy. ISBN 979-8852733078.
- Why I am a Shia. ISBN 979-8329872057.

He has also written a collection of essays regarding the contemporary challenges facing Muslim youth, with emphasis on problems which are more relevant in Western nations where they are a growing minority. Such 'taboo' subjects, such as pornography, alcohol, sex, drugs, and religious extremism are discussed.

He is also the founder of the Ahlulbayt TV a nonprofit, exclusively English-language Shia Islamic television channel, the first of its kind which was launched in 2009 with headquarters in London.

== Lectures ==
Modarressi delivers lectures worldwide on traditional as well as contemporary Islamic issues and has lectured in countless mosques, churches, universities, and seminaries across the globe. He has been interviewed by numerous news platforms and has appeared on TV and radio programs such as the BBC. An ardent advocate of interfaith dialogue, Modarresi engages in such events on a regular basis and has consistently spoken out against acts of terror. He has also been adamant on directing the world's attention to the Arbaeen pilgrimage, calling the whole world to try and understand Hussein, his message, and his sacrifice, for this would allow them to begin to understand the ancient roots of ISIS and its credo of death and destruction.
