= Mohammed Kadhim al-Modarresi =

Iranian-Iraqi Ayatollah (1911-1994)

Ayatollah Sayyid Muhammad-Kadhim al-Modarresi
- السيد محمد كاظم الحسيني المدرسي
- Title: Ayatollah

Personal life
- Born: 1911 Mashhad, Sublime State of Persia
- Died: April 5, 1994 (aged 82–83) Tehran, Iran
- Resting place: Fatima Masumeh Shrine
- Children: Muhammad-Taqi; Hadi; Hussain; Abbas; Ali-Akbar; Ali-Asghar; Muhammad-Baqir
- Parent: Muhammad-Jawad al-Modarresi
- Relatives: Mirza Mahdi al-Shirazi (father-in-law); Muhammad al-Shirazi (brother-in-law); Abd al-A'la al-Sabziwari (brother-in-law); Mohammed Kadhim al-Qazwini (brother-in-law), Mohammed Taqi Morvarid (cousin)

Religious life
- Religion: Islam
- Denomination: Twelver Shīʿā

Ayatollah Sayyid Muhammad-Kadhim al-Husayni al-Modarresi (Persian: محمد كاظم حسينى مدرسى; Arabic: محمد كاظم الحسيني المدرسي; 1911–April 5, 1994) was an Iranian-Iraqi Shia scholar and mystic. He was a prominent teacher at the seminaries of Mashhad and Karbala, teaching Islamic philosophy. He held the Quranic exegesis chair of the Karbala seminary and taught aqaed in the al-Hindiya and al-Badkubeh schools.

Al-Modarresi was constantly in pursuit of spiritual self-discipline by means of self-reflection and other ascetic, religious and ethical practices.

== Family ==
Al-Modarresi was born into a distinguished religious Shia family in Mashhad in Iran. His father was Ayatollah Sayyid Muhammad-Jawad al-Modarresi, the son of grand Ayatollah Sayyid Muhammad-Baqir Golpayegani (also known as Jorfadiqani). His mother was the daughter of Ayatollah Sheikh Ali Akbar Morvarid. He claims descent from Zayd ibn Ali (died c. 740 AD), the great-great-grandson of the Islamic prophet, Muhammad.

== Religious career ==
Al-Modarresi studied and graduated from the religious seminaries of Mashhad. One of al-Modarresi's main teachers was Mirza Mahdi al-Isfahani (d. 1945), the founding father of the tafkiki school of jurisprudence in its new manifestation. Tafkik–as described by Muhammad-Reza Hakimi–"comprises the belief that the truths about religion and the correct knowledge of it are the ones stated in the Quran and have been taught by the Prophet and afterwards by his appointed successors, who have inherited his knowledge." al-Modarresi was a firm believer that acquiring knowledge by other ways than the way shown by the Ahl al-Bayt is tantamount to denying them, i.e. disbelief.

In the 1940s, he emigrated to Najaf with his father, who later died and was buried there. After his father died he moved to Karbala, and joined the religious seminary as a teacher. As well as other sciences, he specialised in teaching the methodologies of al-Isfahani in jurisprudence.

By 1970, due to the rising pressures of the Baathist anti-Shia sentiment, al-Modarresi left for Kuwait with his family. After the Iranian revolution, al-Modarresi relocated to Qom. Over there he established a library, and one of the most interesting books in his collection was a hand-written copy of Nahj al-Balagha, written by Muhammad bin Ali al-Hamdani in October, 1179.

Some of his most notable students included:

- Sayyid Muhammad-Taqi al-Modarresi (his son)
- Sheikh Jawad al-Mothafar
- Sheikh Baqir al-Irawani (recorded al-Modarresi's death in a chronogrammatic poem.)

== Personal life ==
Al-Modarresi married the daughter of grand Ayatollah Mirza Mahdi al-Shirazi in Karbala. He had three daughters, and seven sons, whom are all clerics. They are:

- Muhammad-Taqi is a marja'. He resides in Karbala.
- Hadi is a mujtahid and Islamic intellectual. He resides in Qom.
- Hussain is a mujtahid. He resides in Qom.
- Abbas is a mujtahid and poet. He resides in Karbala.
- Ali-Akbar is an alim and educator. He resides in Mashhad.
- Ali-Asghar is an alim and orator. He resides in Sydney.
- Muhammad-Baqir is an alim and orator. He resides in Mashhad.

His sons-in-law were, Faeq Alkazemi, the son of Kuwaiti businessman Zaid Alkazemi; Sayyid Husayn al-Radhawi, the son of Sayyid Sajjad al-Radhawi; and Bahraini scholar, Sayyid Mahmud al-Musawi al-Bahrani.

== Death ==
Al-Modarresi died of heart failure in the early hours of April 5, 1994 in Tehran, whilst he was performing Fajr prayer.

The night before, his son-in-law narrated that he overheard al-Modarresi talking to himself, saying: "O' Kadhim, enough of this life, do not worry. This is the path that the others have taken. O' Kadhim this is your final night. Strengthen your faith in Allah and do not be fearful."

He was buried in the courtyard of Fatima Masumeh in Qom, in room no. 41, near the grave of Sheikh Fazlollah Nuri.

== Works ==
Al-Modarresi authored one of the leading books on the tafkiki school of jurisprudence named Buhuth Fi al-Ilm (Research in Knowledge).

== See also ==
- Mirza Mahdi al-Shirazi
- Mohammed Taqi al-Modarresi
- Hadi al-Modarresi
- Ali Akbar al-Modarresi
- Mahdi al-Modarresi
