= Ali Al-Wardi =

Iraqi sociologist

Ali Al-Wardi علي الوردي
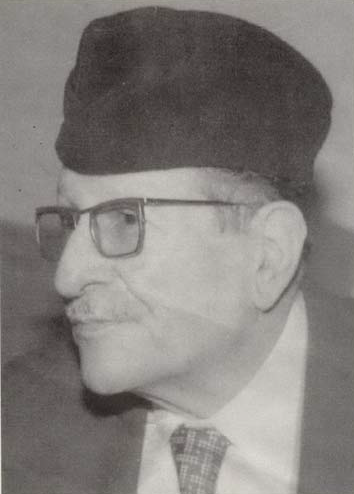
- Born: 24 October 1913; Kadhimiya, Baghdad, Ottoman Iraq
- Died: 13 July 1995 (aged 81); Adhamiyah, Baghdad, Republic of Iraq
- Education: American University of Beirut; University of Texas
- Occupations: Author and lecturer
- Children: Hassan, Jaafar, Faisal, Sina'a
- Writing career
- Language: Arabic
- Genre: Social sciences
- Subjects: History, psychology, parapsychology
- Notable works: A Study into the Nature of Iraqi Society, Preachers of the Sultans

Ali Hussain Muhsin Al-Wardi (Arabic: علي حسين محسن الوردي) was an Iraqi sociologist and public intellectual specialized in the field of social history.

== Early life and education ==
Born in Kadhimiya, Baghdad in 1913, to a religious and very traditional family. He grew up defying his family's strict non-modern-educational policy, where his father wanted him to learn a craft instead of reading books. Nevertheless, Al-Wardi grew up with a disliking for work and crafts and a strong liking for books.

He managed to finish his elementary and high school and was awarded the number one student in the Kingdom of Iraq. He later was appointed as a teacher in different elementary and high schools across Iraq, before winning a scholarship to the American University of Beirut, where he received his bachelor's degree in 1943. He was back in Iraq and was forced into marriage per his father's orders.

A few years later, he traveled to the United States to attain his master's and PhD degrees. He earned his master's degree in 1948 from The University of Texas and his PhD in 1950 from the same university. During that time he used to spend his summers in the United Kingdom learning English in available institutes.

== Career ==
He came back to Iraq to start his career in writing many of his books based on the theory of Ibn Khaldun about Al-Badwa (Nomadic society) vs Al-Hadhara (Civil society).

=== Works ===
The most important works of Ali Al-Wardi are:

1. Psychological Insights from Modern Iraqi History
2. A Study into the Nature of Iraqi Society
3. The Personality of the Iraqi Individual: A Study of Iraqi Personality in Light of New Psychological Science
4. The Sultans' Preachers (Arabic: وعَّاظ السلاطين)
5. The Mockery of the Human Mind (Arabic: مهزلة العقل البشري)
6. Ibn Khaldoon's Teachings based on his Character, Civilization and Personality
7. The Sage of the Fine Arts
8. Dreams Between Science and Belief
9. The Secrets of a Successful Personality
10. That is How they Killed the Princess (water-cress)

Ali Al-Wardi’s books are published by Al-Warrak Publishing (دار الوراق للنشر), which serves as the authorised publisher of his works.

== Legacy ==
An edition of Lamahat Ijtimaʿiyya min Tarikh al-ʿIraq al-Hadith (لمحات اجتماعية من تاريخ العراق الحديث, Social Glimpses of Iraq's Modern History) was published by Al-Warrak Publishing (دار الوراق للنشر) in 2007 as part of its editions of the works of Ali Al-Wardi.

On 31 January, 2024, the Iraqi government together with Ora Developers announced the signing of contract to construct a new residential city named "Ali Al-Wardi City". The planned new city, located approximately 25km southeast of Baghdad and spanning a total area of 61 million square meters, includes 120,000 different housing units along with green spaces, urban amenities, and smart city technology to apply cutting-edge standards in sustainability and environmental preservation. The project aims to reduce population pressure on Baghdad. At the time, it was announced as the largest project of its kind to be implemented in Iraq. On 27 January 2025, the design of the city was officially approved by the Ministry of Construction, Housing, Municipalities and Public Works. Later, the name was changed to Madinat Al Ward (literally “Rose City”). Construction began on 6 May 2025.

== See also ==
- Ibn al-Wardi
