= Fadhil al-Milani =

Iraqi-Iranian religious leader and scholar (1944–2024)

Ayatollah Sayyid Fadhil al-Milani
- السيد فاضل الحسيني الميلاني
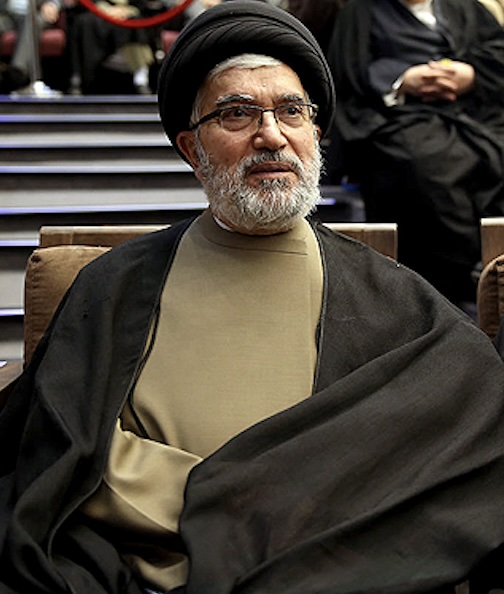
- Al-Milani in 2016
- Title: Ayatollah

Personal life
- Born: 30 May 1944 Karbala, Kingdom of Iraq
- Died: 2 September 2024 (aged 80) London, United Kingdom
- Children: Heydar; Jaafar
- Parent: Abbas al-Milani (father)
- Education: Oxford University
- Relatives: Mohammad Hadi al-Milani (grandfather); Murtadha al-Qazwini (maternal uncle); Ali al-Milani (first cousin)

Religious life
- Religion: Islam
- Denomination: Twelver Shīʿā
- Institute: Imam Khoei Islamic Centre; Khatam al-Nabiyeen

Senior posting
- Based in: London, UK
- Period in office: 1986–2024
- Website: http://www.almilani.com

Sayyid Fadhil al-Hosseini al-Milani (Arabic: السيد فاضل الحسيني الميلاني; 30 May 1944 – 2 September 2024) was an Iraqi Shia academic, author and community leader. Al-Milani was the appointed representative of the late grand Ayatollah Abul Qasim Al-Khoei in the United Kingdom since his arrival in 1986, and was accredited on behalf of grand Ayatollah Ali al-Sistani.

Al-Milani was considered one of the main leading Islamic religious authorities in the United Kingdom and Europe. He was the Dean of the International University of Islamic Studies and the head of Islamic Law and Jurisprudence at the Islamic College. He was also the resident alim of the Imam al-Khoei Foundation in London.

== Family ==
Al-Milani was born to a prominent religious family, that emigrated from Medina, and settled in Milan, West Azerbaijan in the 14th century. al-Milani's great ancestor was Ali al-Asghar, the son of the fourth Shia Imam, Ali Zayn al-Abideen.

== Early life and education ==
Al-Milani was born to Sayyid Abbas al-Milani (died 1982) and the daughter of Sayyid Muhammad-Sadiq al-Qazwini (died 1980), in Karbala. al-Milani studied in the Islamic seminary of Najaf in 1962, under Ayatollah Sayyid Abul Qasim al-Khoei for eight years. In 1968, he studied under grand Ayatollah Sayyid Muhsin al-Hakim, until al-Hakim's death in 1970. He studied in a Beirut Law school and attained a BA in 1967. He then went on to achieve an MA in Arabic Literature from the University of Baghdad.

He moved to Mashhad in 1971, and completed his advanced studies under the guidance of his grandfather, grand Ayatollah Sayyid Muhammad Hadi al-Milani. He was awarded ijtihad at the age of thirty. He remained in Mashhad for just under thirteen years, organising the seminary of Mashhad, that had 3,500 students at the time, under the supervision of his grandfather.

He briefly visited Damascus in 1983, and taught in the Zainabiya Seminary until 1986.

That same year, he immigrated to the United Kingdom, to pursue further academic studies. Whilst in London, he noticed that the West was hugely lacking in Islamic awareness, and the community was in dire need of services and religious guidance. So he wrote to al-Khoei, informing him of his observations, to which al-Khoei responded positively and informed him of his plans to establish an institution (later becoming the Imam al-Khoei Foundation). al-Milani graduated from Oxford University with a PhD in Islamic Philosophy in 1994.

== Opinions and activities ==
=== ISIS ===
Al-Milani told British Muslims not to join fight against ISIS in Iraq. He stated in a video that it was clear that Ayatollah Sistani was calling on citizens of Iraq living in that country only to fight and even then, only by joining the official security forces. This was not a call for open jihad.

However, in an act of unity with other Muslims, al-Milani met in the Palace Of Westminster with other Muslim leaders from cities across the UK, agreeing that there was nothing Islamic about the "Islamic state". They expressed grave concerns at the repeated attacks by ISIS on shrines and places of worship in Iraq, and other parts of the Muslim and non-Muslim world.

=== Interfaith ===
Al-Milani had been an active supporter of interfaith relations. As part of Al-Khoei Foundation's ongoing faith strengthening campaigning, al-Milani regularly met with Christian and Jewish leaders to discuss common issues and the importance of standing together against hate and intolerance.

On the topic of donating blood to non-Muslims (a controversial topic within the faith), al-Milani was of the view that it was a form of religious sacrifice and īthār (altruism).

== Works ==
Al-Milani authored seven books in Arabic, nine in English, and one in Persian. His work on ijtihad and jurisprudence is used in the seminaries of Mashhad and Qom.

- Frequently Asked Questions on Islam. London. 2000.
- Commentary on the Qur’anic Chapter of Night Journey. London. 2002.
- Islamic Family Law. London. 2012.
- Islamic Theology. London. 2016.
- Fatimah al-Zahra Ummu Abiha: Mother to her Father. London. 2018.

== Death ==
Al-Milani fell ill in the early summer of 2024, being diagnosed with cancer. He later succumbed to the illness, and died in his home in London on 2 September 2024, at the age of 80.

== See also ==
- Mohammad Hadi al-Milani
- Murtadha al-Qazwini
- Abu al-Qasim al-Khoei
