= Abd al-A'la al-Sabziwari =

Iranian-Iraqi Grand Ayatollah (1910-1993)

Grand Ayatollah Sayyid Abd al-A'la al-Sabziwari
- عبدالاعلی الموسوي السبزواري
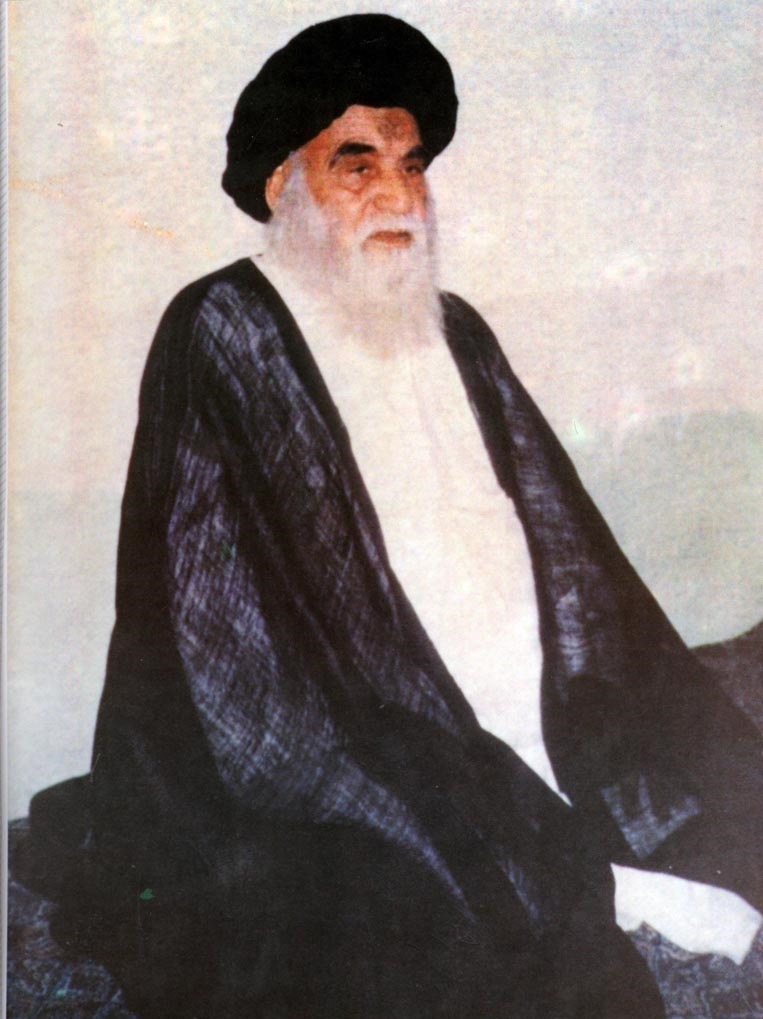
- Sabziwari in 1993

Personal life
- Born: December 21, 1910 Sabzevar, Qajar Iran
- Died: August 16, 1993 (aged 82) Najaf, Ba'athist Iraq
- Resting place: Sabziwari Mosque
- Children: Muhammad; Ali; Hussain
- Relatives: Mohammed Kadhim al-Modarresi (brother-in-law)

Religious life
- Religion: Islam
- Denomination: Twelver Shia
- Jurisprudence: Jaʽfari

Muslim leader
- Based in: Najaf, Iraq
- Period in office: 1992–1993
- Predecessor: Abu al-Qasim al-Khoei, Ruhollah Khomeini
- Successor: Ali al-Sistani, Mohammad Fazel Lankarani

Abd al-A'la al-Musawi al-Sabziwari (Arabic: عبد الأعلى الموسوي السبزواري; Persian: عبدالاعلی موسوی سبزواری) December 21, 1910 – August 16, 1993) was an Iranian-Iraqi Shia marja'. He is regarded as one of the most influential grand religious authorities and he was a contemporary and original successor of Abu al-Qasim Khoei.

He was briefly the head of the Najaf seminary after the death of Khoei in 1992. After Sabzawari's death in 1993, there was competition between Ali Sistani and a few other senior jurists, to lead the seminary. It was after the fall of the Ba'athist regime, that Sistani took exclusive control of the marja'iya.

He is dubbed a renewer in Quranic exegesis, and this is seen in his notable book Mawahib al-Rahman.

== Lineage ==
Sabziwari was born to Sayyid Ali Ridha Sabzevari, a senior alim, in Sabzevar-Iran. He has an ethnic Arab background on his father's side. Sabziwari's great ancestor was Ibrahim al-Mujab, the grandson of the seventh Shia Imam, Musa al-Kadhim. His lineage is as follows:

ʿAbd al-Aʿlā bin ʿAli Ridhā bin ʿAbid Ali bin ʿAbd al-Ghani bin Muḥammad bin Ḥusayn bin Muhammad bin ʿAli bin Masʿud bin Ibrahim bin Ḥasan bin Sharaf al-Din bin Murtadhā bin Zayn al-Abideen bin Muḥammad bin Aḥmed bin Aḥmed bin Muḥammad Shams al-Din bin Aḥmed bin Muḥammad bin Abu al-Fatḥ al-Akhras bin Abu Muḥammad bin Ibrahim bin Abu al-Fityān bin ʿAbdallāh bin al-Ḥasan Baraka bin Aḥmed Abu al-Ṭayyib bin Muḥammad al-Ḥaʾiri bin Ibrahim al-Mujāb bin Muḥammad al-ʿAābid bin Musa al-Kāthim bin Jaʿfar as-Sādiq bin Muḥammad al-Bāqir bin ʿAli al-Sajjad bin Ḥusayn al-Shahid bin ʿAli Ibna Abi Talib.

== Religious Education ==
=== 1914-1923: Sabzevar ===
Sabziwari began his primary education in Islamic studies and Arabic at a very young age in his birthplace. He studied jurisprudence and principles of jurisprudence under his father and his second cousin once removed, Sayyid Abdallah Sabzevari, also known as al-Burhan.

=== 1924-1932: Mashhad ===
In 1924, he travelled to Mashhad and studied under senior clerics such as Sheikh Hasanali Isfahani, Mirza Adib Nishaburi, Mirza Askar Shahidi, Sayyid Muhammad Lawasani Assar and Sheikh Ali Akbar Nahawandi. He remained in Mashhad for eight years.

=== 1932-1946: Najaf ===
In 1932, he decided to go to Najaf to complete his advanced education in jurisprudence, principles of jurisprudence, philosophy, exegesis and other Islamic sciences. However, he decided to walk the distance from Mashhad, and this took him just over a month. In Najaf, he attended the classes run by great religious authorities such as Sheikh Muhammad-Hussain Na'ini, Shiekh Dhiya al-Dina Iraqi, Sheikh Muhammad-Hussain al-Gharawi Isfahani and Sayyid Abu al-Hasan sfahani.

He arranged to be taught by Sheikh Muhammad-Jawad Balaghi a year before he died, and participated in his Quranic exegesis classes. This helped him with exegesis, debating and theology. He studied philosophy and gnosis under Sayyid Hussain Badkubeyi and Sayyid Ali Qadhi.

He gained the level of ijtihad at the age of 36, from prominent scholars including Sheikh Abdallah Mamaqani and Sheikh Abbas Qumi. By 1946, he was teaching an advanced level of jurisprudence and principles of jurisprudence.

== Political Stand ==
Sabziwari was an avid supporter of the people of Iraq and was the only marja' who issued a fatwa in support of the 1991 uprising, which began with the quranic verse "Permission [to fight] has been given to those who are being fought, because they were wronged. And indeed, Allah is competent to give them victory." [22:39], disregarding the inevitable consequences.

He took stands against the Ba'athist regime and rarely compromised. His house was besieged several times by regime forces, who later placed several restrictions on him.

== Family ==
Sazbiwari was married to the daughter of Ayatollah Muhammad-Jawad Modarresi, and had three sons (Muhammad, Ali and Hussain) and one daughter.

Muhammad died in a car accident, between Tehran and Qom in April, 1994, aged 48. Ali is a senior cleric that resides in Najaf, and is a teacher at the seminary of Najaf. Hussain is also a cleric who resides in Mashhad and teaches in its seminary. Sabziwari's wife is the paternal aunt of Grand Ayatollah Muhammad-Taqi Modarresi.

== Death ==
Sabziwari died in the late hours of Monday, August 16, 1993, in Najaf. According to London-based researcher, Dr. Sahib al-Hakim, Sabziwari was killed by poisoning at the hands of Ba'athist regime operatives.

Due to the Ba'athist restrictions, Sabziwari's funeral was only attended by his family, and he was buried in the mosque that he taught in, which is known today as Sabziwari Mosque, in the al-Huwaysh mahala in Najaf.

== Works ==
Sabziwari wrote on various topics, mostly involving Islamic jurisprudence and philosophy. His works include:

- Mawahib al-Rahman Fi Tafsir al-Qur'an (Talents of the Merciful in the Exegesis of the Quran): 30 volumes (only 12 volumes have yet been published). It is reported that Sabziwari, once saw Muhammad in his dream, and he gave him a Quran, and said "Here, take the talents of the merciful". In response, Sabziwari decided to use those words as part of the title of his book.
- Muhadhab al-Ahkam Fi Bayan al-Halal wa al-Haram (Rectified Laws in what is Allowed and Forbidden): 30 volumes
- Tahthib al-Usul (Rectifying the Principles of Jurisprudence): 2 volumes
- Lubab al-Ma'arif: 2 volumes
- Ifadat al-Bari Fi Naqd Ma Allafahu al-Hakim al-Sabziwari
- Rafd al-Fudul 'Aan 'Ilm al-Usul
- Minhaj al-Salihin
- Manasik al-Hajj
- Risalaye Tawdhihe Masa'el
