= Mohammad Taqi al-Modarresi =

Iraqi-Iranian Shia marja' and political theorist (born 1945)

Grand Ayatollah Sayyid Mohammad Taqi al-Modarresi
- السيد محمد تقي الحسيني المدرسي
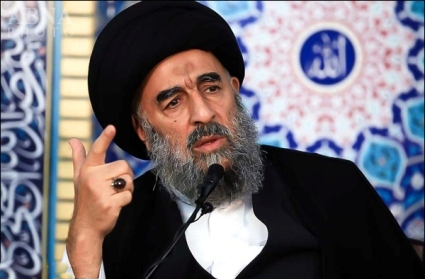

Personal life
- Born: 1 July 1945 (age 81) Karbala, Kingdom of Iraq
- Children: Salih; Muhammed-Ridha; Murtadha; Muhsin; Sajjad; Sadiq
- Parent: Mohammed Kadhim al-Modarresi (father)
- Notable work(s): From the Guidance of the Quran; Islamic Mysticism
- Relatives: Hadi al-Modarresi (brother); Ali Akbar al-Modarresi (brother); Mirza Mahdi al-Shirazi (grandfather); Muhammad al-Shirazi (maternal uncle); Abd al-A'la al-Sabziwari (uncle-in-law)
- Website: Official website

Religious life
- Religion: Islam
- Sect: Shia; Twelver

Muslim leader
- Based in: Karbala, Iraq
- Period in office: 2003–present

Grand Ayatollah Sayyid Muhammad-Taqi al-Husayni al-Modarresi (Arabic: محمد تقي الحسيني المدرسي) is an Iraqi Shia marja' and political theorist.

al-Modarresi is the author of over 400 books on theology, historiography, jurisprudence, philosophy, logic, and social science. The Anglican Centre in Rome has stated that "Grand Ayatollah al-Modarresi is probably the second most senior Shia cleric after al-Sistani.

== Early life and education ==
al-Modarresi was born into a distinguished Shia religious family in Karbala in Iraq. His father is Ayatollah Sayyid Muhammad-Kadhim al-Modarresi, the grandson of grand Ayatollah Sayyid Muhammad-Baqir Golpayegani (also known as Jorfadiqani). His mother is the daughter of grand Ayatollah Sayyid Mahdi al-Shirazi. He claims descent from Zayd ibn Ali (died c. 740 AD), the great-great-grandson of the Islamic prophet, Muhammad.

al-Modarresi began his religious education in the religious seminaries of Karbala, at the age of 8. He studied under some of Karbala's most senior scholars such as Shaykh Muhammad al-Karbassi, Shaykh Jafar al-Rushti, Shaykh Yusuf al-Khurasani and his uncle, Sayyid Muhammad al-Shirazi. Due to the rising pressures of the Bathists anti-Shia sentiment, al-Modarresi emigrated to Kuwait in 1971. He settled there until 1979, after which he moved to Iran after the Iranian Revolution.

== Activism ==
=== The Risali Movement ===
In 1967, under the jurisprudential guidance of Muhammad al-Shirazi, al-Modarresi established a religious activist group known as the Risali Movement (Arabic: الحركة الرسالية). The word risali (follower of the message) was inspired by the Quranic verse: "[Allah praises] those who convey the messages of Allah and fear Him and do not fear anyone but Allah. And sufficient is Allah as Accountant." [33:39].

Before the Iranian revolution, the group remained a secret organisation, working on raising religious awareness, however, after the 1979 Iranian revolution, it went public, calling for Islamism in the region, with different aliases across various countries. In Iraq, it was known as the Islamic Action Organisation. In Saudi Arabia, it was known as the Islamic Revolution of the Arabian Peninsula. In Bahrain, it was known as the Islamic Front for the Liberation of Bahrain and headed by his brother Hadi. But all these groups were identified as the risalis in the Islamic world.

The movement inspired some Sunni activists to support the movement in their writings, this included Dr. Ahmed al-Abyadh of the Renaissance Organisation in Tunisia and various activists from Morocco.

Many books were issued to propagate the Risali Movement, some of the ones al-Modarresi wrote included:

- Fi Suluk al-Risali (The Ways of a Risali)
- Kayfa Nunami al-Fi'at al-Risaliya (How We Develop Risali Factions)
- al-Masjid Muntalaq al-Thawra al-Risaliya (The Mosque Is The Starting Point of The Risali Revolution)
- Khalaya al-Muqawama al-Risaliya (The Cells of the Risali Resistance)
- Tajarob Risaliya (Risali Trials)
- 'An al-I'lam Wa al-Thaqafa al-Risaliya (About Risali Culture and Media)
- al-Sha'b al-Iraqi Wa Mas'uliyatahu al-Risaliya (The Iraqi Nation and its Risali Responsibilities )
- al-Mar'a Bayna Maham al Hayat Wa Mas'uliyat al-Risala (A Woman Between Her Life Tasks and Risali Responsibilities)
- Fatima al-Zahra Ra'idat al-Thawra al-Risaliya (Fatima Zahra: The Leader of The Risali Movement)

The movement had an anthem written by al-Modarresi's brother, Abbas, that was recited in their gatherings, and then recorded and published as a sound track:

لمستضعفي الأرض قلنا نعمْ
لا للــطـــــواغيت لا للـــصــنــــمْ
هــبّـوا لــنـرفـــع هــــذا الــعــلــمْ
ثــم الكـــفـــاح بــــالسـلاح والقلمْ
أنــت يـا شــعــبــي منــذ الــقــدم
كــــان شــــعــــــــارك ثــــــورة ودمْ
آن الأوان لــــــنــــــرفــــــع الألــــــم
نــــوفــــي بــعــهد الله والقـسـم

تـــعـــالوا تـــعـــالوا لـــقـــبر الشهيد
تـــعـــاهـــد بـــالوفا مـــن جـــديـــدْ
نـــعـــاهـــد أن نـــرفـــض الظالمين
ونـــشـــجـــب بـــالـــدم قـهـر الحديدْ
نـــحـــرر.. أوطاننا
ليـــحكم.. قـــرآنــنا

Translation:

To the sufferers of this earth we say: Yes!
No to tyrants! No to idols!
Hasten, let us raise this flag,
Then struggle with our weapon and pen.
My nation, you have always;
Held the symbol of revolution and blood
It is time we raise the pain
And make good of God's cause and oath.

Come, come to the grave of the martyr,
To renew your allegiance once again.
We swear to reject oppression,
And fill our metal with blood.
Liberating.. Our nations
So that to rule.. Our Quran

The Risali Movement, established by al-Modarresi in 1967, played a significant role in fostering Shia political activism across the Gulf region, including Bahrain. Initially operating as a secret organization focused on religious awareness, the movement gained prominence following the 1979 Iranian Revolution, advocating for Islamist principles and influencing various Shia opposition groups. In Bahrain, the Risali Movement manifested as the Islamic Front for the Liberation of Bahrain (IFLB), which sought to overthrow the Al Khalifa regime and establish an Islamic government. Although the IFLB faced significant opposition and was largely led by al-Modarresi's brother, Hadi al-Modarresi, the movement underscored the transnational nature of Shia political networks and contributed to heightened tensions between Bahrain and Iran.

== Return to Iraq and role ==
=== Arrest by Coalition forces ===
With the overthrow of Saddam Hussein by American-led forces in 2003, al-Modarresi along with other Iran-based clerics returned to Iraq. On his return to Iraq on 22 April 2003, al-Modarresi was arrested along with his entourage by US military personnel. He was released after being brought to an undisclosed location.

=== Iraqi politics ===
The Islamic Action Organization became an Iraqi Shia Islamist political party with al-Modaressi as its leader. The party contested the Iraq 2005 general election and was part of the National Iraqi Alliance of Shia Islamist parties including SCIRI, the Islamic Dawa Party and the Iraqi National Congress. In 2006, the Islamic Action Organization had one minister in government, State Minister for Civil Society Affairs, Adil al-Asadi.

In an interview with PBS in 2004 al-Modarresi affirmed his commitment to a democratically elected government for the new Iraq, stating that he had derived this from "the true interpretation of Islam.. which says, "Religion shall not be imposed ... Reason emerges from the unknown." He also stated that he had traveled to Europe and America, and that he believed "democracy would solve many of the problems" in the Middle East.

=== Call against ISIS ===
al-Modarresi was the first Shia religious leader (with Grand Ayatollah al-Sistani following shortly after) to issue a call to popular resistance against ISIS, after its swift capture of large swathes of land in Iraq in June 2014. In his statement, al-Modarresi warned against the destruction of churches and temples belonging to all religions.

=== COVID-19 ===
al-Modarresi made an official statement regarding the COVID-19 strain, saying that the people of Iraq should self-isolate, and utilise the month of Rajab, by performing the recommended prayers and supplications at home. He also stated that Muslim community needs to increase its faith in God, so that He may protect us from all evil. al-Modarresi also called for the Iraqi government to take up all measures to face this new viral strain, which threatens the lives of many today. He added, the Iraqi people are always willing to stand by its government and provide aid, as is seen in the Arbaeen pilgrimage.

== International stage ==
=== Bahrain 2002 ===
al-Modaressi traveled to Bahrain in 2002 on an official visit, at the invitation of the Minister of Justice and Islamic Affairs, Abdullah bin Khalid Al Khalifa.

=== Vatican 2014 ===
In December 2014, al-Modarresi was invited by the Pope to attend a summit of world religious leaders at the Vatican. This made him the first Grand Ayatollah to have met the Pope. In his speech, al-Modarresi asked world religious leaders to "engage in a symbiosis of civilizations and religions". He condemned terrorism, nuclear proliferation, modern day slavery and said:

"At its core, divine religion is one, but failure to understand religion has divided human beings and created barriers between us.. We must exert extra effort to tear down those barriers and join religions under the umbrella of a common term.. We have a calling to love one another.. to protect the environment, to stop the spread of weapons of mass destruction, and to end slavery in all its forms.".

=== Australia 2016 ===
In 2016 he went to Australia, where he met community leaders as well as the Australian Foreign Minister Julie Bishop. The two discussed Iraq, the war on terrorism, as well as how Muslims can be better integrated into the Australian community.

== Established institutions ==
- al-Qaim Seminary (Arabic: حوزة القائم) - established by al-Modarresi in 1980, in Mamazand, Tehran. The seminary was split into two buildings. The first building was previously a women's society building in the time of the Shah. The second building was one of Princess Farah's palaces. In its peak, the seminary contained students from 18 different countries. The main lessons taught included: - Jurisprudence: al-Masa'il al-Islamiyya by Muhammad al-Shirazi, Fiqh Imam al-Sadiq by Muhammad-Jawad Mughniyah, al-Lum'a al-Dimashqiyya by Shahid al-Awwal, al-Makasib by Shaykh al-Ansari, Mustamsak al-Urwa by Muhsin al-Hakim. - Foundations: Mabadi' al-Usul by al-Fadhli, Usul al-Fiqh by Shaykh al-Muthafar, al-Rasa'il by Shaykh al-Ansari, al-Kifaya by Akhund Khorasani. - Logic: Mantiq by al-Modarresi, al-Khilasa by al-Fadhli, Mantiq by Shaykh al-Muthafar. - Arabic Grammar: Al-Ajurrumiyya by Muhammad al-Adjurum, al-Minhaj by Imam al-Nawawi, al-Qawa'id by Imad Ali Juma, Qatr al-Nida by Ibn Hisham Al-Ansari, Jami' al-Durus al-Arabiyya by Mustafa al-Ghalayini, Sharh Ibn Aqeel by Abdullah al-Aqili, Mughni al-Labib by Ibn Hisham Al-Ansari. After the death of Ruhollah Khomeini, the Iranian intelligence, headed by Mohammad Reyshahri, began to get involved in the seminary and its syllabus. It began with introducing a mandatory Farsi class of 2.5 hours a day. This then was followed by the introduction of a few other lessons like al-A'immah al-Ithna Ashar by Adil al-Adib.
- Al-Jaafaria Shia Islamic Centre - established in 1991, in Kogarah, Sydney.
- al-Qaim School - established in 1995, in Sayyidah Zaynab, Damascus.
- al-Husayniya al-Zaynabiya - established in 2002, in Gonbad Sabz, Mashhad.
