= Ibn Sufi =

11th-century Shiite genealogist

Ibn Sufi Ali ibn Muhammad Alawi Umari
- Born: c. 1000 CE c. 390 AH; Basra
- Died: c. 1068 CE c. 460 AH; Mosul
- Resting place: Mosul
- Occupations: Genealogist; Literary scholar; Poet; Jurist
- Notable work: The Arabic book "Al-Majdi fi Ansabi al-Taalebiyin" (in Arabic: ألمَجدی فی أنسابِ الطّالبیّین, lit. 'Attributed to Al-Majdi in the Lineages of the Taalebis People')
- Father: Abu al-Ghana'im Muhammad, known as Ibn Mahlabiyah

Ali ibn Muhammad al-Umari al-Alawi, known as Ibn Sufi (born c. 1000 CE—c. 390 AH in Basra, died c. 1068 CE—c. 460 AH in Mosul), was a prominent Shiite genealogist and the author of the famous Arabic historical genealogy book "Al-Majdi fi Ansabi al-Taalebiyin" (in Arabic: ألمَجدی فی أنسابِ الطّالبیّین, lit. 'Attributed to Al-Majdi in the Lineages of the Taalebis People').

== Life and lineage ==
He was known as Najm al-Din Abu al-Hasan Ali ibn Abu al-Ghanaim al-Umari al-Alawi. Ibn Sufi was born and raised in Basra, and is known as "Umari" and also "Alawi" due to his ancestry to his grandfather, "Umar al-Atraf", the son of the first Shia Imam, "Ali", known as "Ibn Taghlibiyah".

Ibn Sufi's father, "Abu al-Ghana'im Muhammad", known as "Ibn Mahlabiyah", was considered as an authority on the genealogy science. In fact, genealogy had a long history in Ibn Sufi's family, and even his sixth grandfather, "Muhammad Sufi", to whom Ibn Sufi is attributed and who was killed by order of Harun al-Rashid (the fifth Abbasid caliph of the Abbasid Empire), was also a genealogist.

It seems that Ibn Sufi spent most, if not all, of his time in Baghdad between 1016 CE to 1029 CE (407 AH to 420 AH). Ibn Sufi migrated from Basra to Mosul in 1032 CE (423 AH), where he married and settled down.

Ibn Sufi, in his account of the lineage of Zayd ibn Ali, referred to Twelver school of thought as his own sect. According to Ibn al-Tiqtaqa (a prominent historian) in his book "Al-Asili", Ibn Sufi died in Mosul.

== Educations ==
As Ibn Sufi himself says, from childhood he studied various sciences, especially genealogy, and benefited from the presence of great masters. Ibn Tawus (a Shiite jurist, theologian, historian and astrologer) considered Ibn Sufi as the foremost genealogist of his time, and according to Ibn Inabah (a Shiite historian and genealogist), Ibn Sufi's statement in the field of genealogy was a proof. Ibn Sufi traveled to many lands and cities to gain experience and knowledge in sciences specially in genealogy, such as Ramla, Nusaybin, Levant, Mayafarfin, Egypt, Oman, Kufa, and Ukbara. Ibn Sufi has also been introduced by some historians as a writer, poet, and jurist.

== His masters ==
In various historical Shia books, the names of 20 of Ibn Sufi's masters are mentioned. Ibn Sufi mentioned the names of some of his masters in his book "Al-Majdi fi Ansabi al-Taalebiyin" (in Arabic: ألمَجدی فی أنسابِ الطّالبیّین, lit. 'Attributed to Al-Majdi in the Lineages of the Taalebis People') too. Among Ibn Sufi's masters, the following prominent individuals can be mentioned:

- Abu al-Hasan Muhammad, known as Ubayduli
- Abu al-Ghana'im Muhammad, Ibn Sufi's father
- Abu Abdullah Hussein ibn Muhammad ibn Tabataba'i Alawi
- Abu Ali ibn Shihab al-Ukbari
- Abu Abdullah Hamawiyah
- Abu Ali Qattan Muqri
- Ibn Katilah al-Hussaini

and

- Ibn Khuda' al-Misri

Ibn Sufi was a contemporary of Sharif al-Murtaza (one of the greatest Shia scholars of his time), and Ibn Sufi met with him in Baghdad in 1034 CE (425 AH). According to Sayyid Ali Khan Madani (a Shiite scholar), Ibn Sufi studied a while under the supervision of Sharif al-Murtaza and narrated hadiths from him and his brother Al-Sharif al-Radi, but Ibn Sufi himself does not mention this.

== His works ==
The writings of Ibn Sufi are more famous in the field of Islamic genealogy. The following can be mentioned among others:

- Al-Majdi fi Ansabi al-Taalebiyin, in Arabic: ألمَجدی فی أنسابِ الطّالبیّین, lit. 'Attributed to Al-Majdi in the Lineages of the Taalebis People'
  This is his most important book, written in the study of the lineage of the family of the prophet of Islam Muhammad, and the Shiite Imams. Ibn Sufi traveled to Egypt in 1051 CE (443 AH), where he presented some of his works to "Majd al-Dawlah Abul-Hassan Ahmad" (president of the House of Wisdom of the time), during the Fatimid Empire. "Abu Talib Muhammad", the son of "Majd al-Dawlah Abul-Hassan Ahmad", asked Ibn Sufi to write a brief book on genealogy. Ibn Sufi also attributed the book to him in recognition of the kindness of "Majd al-Dawlah" and called it "Al-Majdi" in the first phrase of the book name which means "Attributed to Al-Majdi". "Ibn Tabataba" (one of the Imams of Zaydism), a contemporary of Ibn Sufi, was the first person which mention the book "Al-Majdi fi Ansabi al-Taalebiyin", indicating that the book enjoyed fame and prestige during the author's lifetime. The book "Al-Majdi fi Ansabi al-Taalebiyin" is written on the lineage of the Prophet Muhammad and the Shiite Imams up to lineage of Muhammad al-Jawad (a descendant of the Islamic prophet Muhammad and the ninth of the Twelve Imams) and their children and grandchildren, and Ibn Sufi has also included the schools of thought of genealogists and their differences of opinion in this work. This book is one of the ancient and authoritative works of genealogy, and some, including Ali ibn Tawus al-Hilli (a Shiite jurist, theologian, historian and astrologer), have written commentaries on it. The book "Al-Majdi fi Ansabi al-Taalebiyin" was edited and republished in Qom in 1989 CE (1409 AH), by Ahmad Mahdavi Damghani (an Iranian scholar and university professor).
- Al-Rasa'el, in Arabic: الرسائل, lit. 'The Messages'
  In the science of genealogy.
- Al-Shaafi, in Arabic: الشافی, lit. 'The Healer'
  In the science of genealogy. According to Ibn al-Tiqtaqa, this book is in two parts, the first of which is dedicated to the genealogy of the Abbasid dynasty and the second to the genealogy of the children of the first Shia Imam, Ali. This book has not been obtained yet;
- Al-Oyoun, in Arabic: العیون, lit. 'The Eyes'
  In the science of genealogy.
- Al-Mabsut, in Arabic: المبسوط, lit. 'The Extended'
  In the science of genealogy. According to Ibn al-Tiqtaqa, "Al-Mabsut" was a large book in several volumes. He saw this book in Ibn Sufi's own handwriting and quoted from it.
- Al-Mosha'jjar, in Arabic: المشجر, lit. 'The Family Connection Trees'
  In the science of genealogy.

== See also ==
- Ibn Inabah
- Ibn Adlan
- Ibn Ishaq
- Abbas Quchani
- Ahmad Khonsari
- Imamzadeh Ali ibn Jafar
- Mirza Javad Agha Tehrani
- Mohammad Ali Naseri
- Mohammad Ali Shah Abadi
- Mohammad Javad Ansari Hamedani
- Seyed Abolhassan Shams Abadi
- Salawat
- Umdat al-Talib
- Islamic honorifics
- Revelation
- Mohammad Behbahani
- Agha Hossein Khansari
- Ahmad ibn Isa ibn Zayd
- Ahmad ibn Ishaq Ash'ari Qomi
- Aqa Najafi Quchani
- Atlas of Shia
- Du'a al-Sabah
- Ehya night
- Baha ad-Din ibn Shaddad
