= Mohammad Javad Ansari Hamedani =

Iranian religious scholar 1902–1960

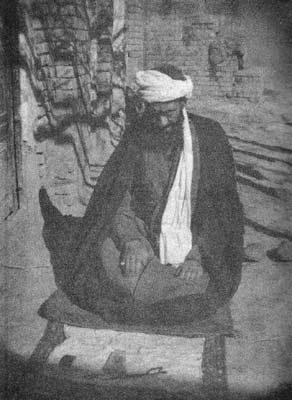

Personal life
- Born: 1902 Hamadan, Sublime State of Iran
- Died: 29 April 1960 (aged 57–58) Hamadan, Imperial State of Iran
- Resting place: Golzar Shohada of Qom, Qom
- Parent: Mullah Fath Ali Hamedani (father)
- Education: Ijtihad
- Occupation: Fiqh; Islamic Principle; Mysticism

Religious life
- Religion: Islam
- Sect: Shia; Twelver

Muslim leader
- Teacher: Abdolkarim Haeri Yazdi; Mirza Ali Khalkhali; Seyed Ali Arab; Seyyed Ali Shahidi
- Disciples: Abdol Hossein Dastgheib; Mohammad Hossein Hosseini Tehrani; Hasan Ali Nejabat Shirazi; Ali Mohammad Dastgheib Shirazi; Mohammad Ismaeel Doulabi; Karim Mahmoud Haqiqi

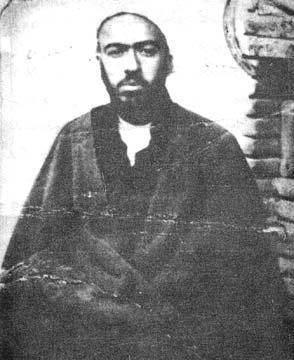
Mohammad Javad Ansari Hamedani in his youth

Mohammad Javad Ansari Hamedani (1902 – 29 April 1960) was a contemporary Iranian Shiite Faqih and mystic. He was the son of Mullah Fath Ali Hamedani and was born in Hamadan and grew up in an Islamic religious Shia family.

== Educations ==
At the age of seven, he started learning seminary lessons such as Morphology and Syntax with his father. From the age of twelve, which coincided with the death of his father, he studied Islamic jurisprudence and principles and some philosophical books under revision of Hamadan scholars such as Mirza Ali Khalkhali, Seyed Arab, Ali Shahidi, Mohammad Ismaeel Emadol Eslam. He studied in the fields of Unani medicine, courses of Abu Bakr al-Razi, and the science of self-knowledge and ethics under revision of Mirza Hossein Kosar Hamedani, the brother of Reza Vaez, a famous preacher. Ansari Hamedani reached the level of ijtihad at the age of 24, which was approved by scholars of Qom such as Abdolkarim Haeri Yazdi, Abu l-Hasan al-Isfahani, Mohammad Taqi Khansari and Qomi Borujerdi.

== Tendency to Mysticism ==
At first, he had no inclination towards mysticism, one day during his studentship in Hamadan, he heard that a mystic had come to Hamadan dressed as a scholar and some people had gathered around him. In order to guide this man, Mohammad Javad Ansari Hamedani entered the meeting and gave a speech for about 2 hours that "there is no other way but the Sharia path, and if there is, it is pure deviation." At the end of his words, that mystic man looked at him and said to him: "Soon you yourself will set fire to the hearts of the burned ones of the world!" After this event, a transformation takes place inside Ansari Hamedani and in order to find a master and a mentor and a guide on the path of divine love, he generally turns away from people, he often goes to the desert to pray and supplicate in the cold and heat weather, or he goes to pilgrimage of the shrine of Fatima bint Musa in Qom, which finally After repeated appeals, a hope arise for him by appeal to the Prophet of Islam and he reached such a level in spiritual side that Seyed Ali Ghazi said about him: "He did not have a teacher in his way and he received monotheism directly from God."

His tense mystical moods caused him to be excommunicated by some illiterate peoples, Abdolkarim Haeri Yazdi (his teacher) advised him to hide his moods. This period, which begins when he is about 28 years old, continues with restlessness and inflammation until he is about 40 years old, until he reaches peace.

== His Masters ==
He was trained under the supervision of elders such as:

=== Islamic Jurisprudence and Principles ===
- Mirza Ali Khalkhali
- Seyed Ali Arab
- Seyyed Ali Shahidi
- Mohammad Ismaeel Emadol Eslam
- Mohammad Kazem Shirazi

=== Other Fields ===
- Fath Ali Ansari Hamedani (Morphology and syntax - his father)
- Mirza Hossein Kosar Hamedani (Medicine, self-knowledge and ethics)
- Abdolkarim Haeri Yazdi

== His Disciples ==
Many people were influenced by him. including:

- Hasan Ali Nejabat Shirazi
- Abdol Hossein Dastgheib
- Karim Mahmoud Haqiqi
- Seyed Mohammad Mahdi Dastgheib (Brother of Abdul Hossein Dastgheib and guardian of Shah Cheragh)
- Ali Mohammad Dastgheib Shirazi (Nephew of Abdul Hossein Dastgheib)
- Seyed Mohammad Hossein Hosseini Tehrani
- Ismaeel Doulabi
- Haj Hadi Abhari
- Seyed Hossein Yaqoubi Qaeni
- Seyed Abdullah Fatemi Shirazi
- Seyed Jalal Tanavosh (his son-in-law)
- Afrasiabi (his son-in-law)
- Haj Mohammad Hassan Sherkat
- Haj Mohsen Sherkat
- Mohammad Ibrahim Islamieh (his son-in-law)
- Mohammad Jaberi Arabloo
- Gholamhossein Sabzevari
- Gholamhossein Homayoni
- Mohammad Hassan Bayati
- Seyed Ahmad Hosseinian
- Esmaeel Takhtesangi (Mahdavinia)
- Seyed Ahmad Hosseini Hamedani

== See also ==
- Abbas Quchani
- Ahmad Khonsari
- Mohammad Ali Naseri
- Mohammad Behbahani
- Muhammad Husayn Tabataba'i
- Mohammad Ali Shah Abadi
- Mirza Javad Agha Tehrani
- Seyed Abolhassan Shams Abadi
