= Al-Majdi fi Ansab al-Talibiyyin =

Arabic genealogy book

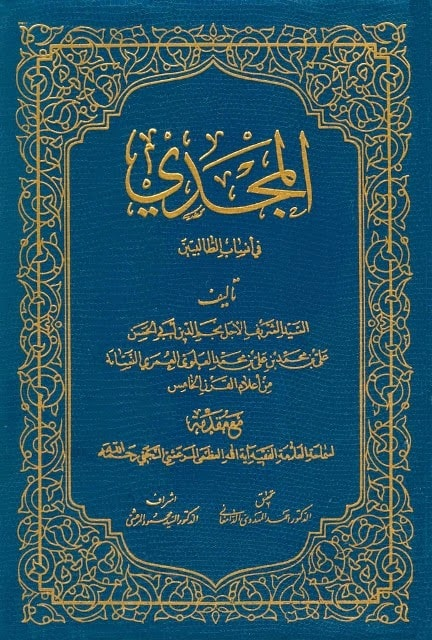
- Author: Ali ibn Muhammad Alawi Umari, known as Ibn Sufi
- Original title: ألمَجدی فی أنسابِ الطّالبیّین
- Language: The original manuscript is written in Arabic.; The 1989 modern printed style is in Arabic too, but it has many commentaries in Persian language.
- Series: 1 Volume.
- Subject: The genealogy of the Prophet of Islam, Muhammad and the Shia Imams, specially the first Shia Imam, Ali.
- Genre: Islamic genealogy
- Publisher: Revived and republished by Ayatollah Marashi Najafi Library
- Publication date: The original handwriting edition belonged to the fifth century AH—11th century AD/CE; 1989 AD/CE (republished in new modern printed style in Iran)
- Media type: Original edition was on handwriting ancient paper
- Pages: 493 pages in academic revived printed version

Al-Majdi fi Ansab al-Talibiyyin (Arabic: ألمَجدی فی أنسابِ الطّالبیّین, lit. 'Attributed to Majdi in the Lineages of the Talibis Peoples') is an Arabic book written by Ali ibn Muhammad Alawi Umari known as Ibn Sufi on the subject of genealogy dating back to the fifth century AH—11th century AD/CE. In this work, the author discusses the genealogy of the descendants of the Alawis and the Talebis, especially the genealogy of the first Shiite Imam, Ali and his descendants. Almost a thousand years have passed since the life of this handwritten manuscript book.

== Author ==
"Ali ibn Muhammad Alawi Umari" with the full name of "Najmuddin Abul-Hasan Ali ibn Abul-Ghanaim Alawi Umari" known as "Ibn Sufi" (born c. 1000 AD/CE—c. 390 AH in Basra, died c. 1068 AD/CE—c. 460 AH in Mosul) was a prominent Shiite genealogist. The famous Arabic historical genealogy book "Al-Majdi fi Ansabi al-Taalebiyin" (in Arabic: ألمَجدی فی أنسابِ الطّالبیّین, lit. 'Attributed to Majdi in the Lineages of the Talibis People') was his most important work in his entire lifetime.

Ibn Sufi was born and raised in Basra, and is known as "Umari" and also "Alawi" due to his ancestry to his grandfather, "Umar al-Atraf", the son of the first Shia Imam, "Ali", known as "Ibn Taghlibiyah". Ibn Sufi's father, "Abu al-Ghana'im Muhammad", known as "Ibn Mahlabiyah", was considered as an authority on the genealogy science. In fact, genealogy had a long history in Ibn Sufi's family, and even his sixth grandfather, "Muhammad Sufi", to whom Ibn Sufi is attributed and who was killed by order of Harun al-Rashid (the fifth Abbasid caliph of the Abbasid Empire), was also a genealogist. It seems that Ibn Sufi spent most, if not all, of his time in Baghdad between 1016 AD/CE to 1029 AD/CE (407 AH to 420 AH). Ibn Sufi migrated from Basra to Mosul in 1032 AD/CE (423 AH), where he married and settled down. Ibn Sufi, in his account of the lineage of Zayd ibn Ali, referred to Twelver school of thought as his own sect. According to Ibn al-Tiqtaqa (a prominent historian) in his book "Al-Asili", Ibn Sufi died in Mosul.

As Ibn Sufi himself says, from childhood he studied various sciences, especially genealogy, and benefited from the presence of great masters. Ibn Tawus (a Shiite jurist, theologian, historian and astrologer) considered Ibn Sufi as the foremost genealogist of his time, and according to Ibn Inabah (a Shiite historian and genealogist), Ibn Sufi's statement in the field of genealogy was a proof. Ibn Sufi traveled to many lands and cities to gain experience and knowledge in sciences specially in genealogy, such as Ramla, Nusaybin, Levant, Mayafarfin, Egypt, Oman, Kufa, and Ukbara. Ibn Sufi has also been introduced by some historians as a writer, poet, and jurist.

== Subject ==
The book "Al-Majdi fi Ansab al-Talibiyyin" includes the genealogy of the Islamic Prophet Muhammad and his family, especially the twelve Shiite Imams. The subject of this book is the genealogy of Sadat. Authentic Shia hadiths have been used to prove the ratios mentioned in the book.

The book "Al-Majdi fi Ansab al-Talibiyyin" is an important work on the subject of Islamic genealogy dating back to the fifth century AH—11th century AD/CE, in which the author discusses the genealogies of the descendants of the Alawites and Talebites, especially the genealogy of the first Shia Imam, Ali, and his descendants.

== Content ==
The author first briefly discusses the lineage of the Islamic prophet Muhammad and then discusses the lineage of Abu Talib ibn Abd al-Muttalib's family. The three main parts of the book include the genealogy of the three sons of Abu Talib ibn Abd al-Muttalib, namely Ali, Jafar, and Aqil, and the description of the genealogy of the family of Ali, the first Shiite Imam, occupies a larger part.

At the beginning of the description of Ali's lineage, the author also mentions his daughters and then introduces the lineage of Ali's first son and the second Imam of the Shiites, Hassan ibn Ali, then introduces the lineage of Ali's second son and the third Imam of the Shiites, Hussein ibn Ali, then introduces the lineage of Ali's third son Muhammad ibn al-Hanafiyya, then introduces the lineage of Ali's another son Abbas ibn Ali (Abu al-Fadl), and then introduces the lineage of Ali's another son Umar al-Atraf, who is the grandfather of the author of the book. Also, in the genealogy section of the descendants of Ali's second son, Hussein ibn Ali, the genealogies of the descendants of other Shiite Imams are briefly mentioned. In describing the lineage of each Shiite Imam, the author also provides a brief description of him, with a little more explanation about the twelfth Shiite Imam, Muhammad al-Mahdi.

This book contains the genealogy of the Alawites and Talebites who migrated to lands outside the Hijaz and Iraq, some of whom gained fame and status.

The book begins with brief information about the genealogy of the Messenger of God, Islamic Prophet Muhammad. At the beginning of the book, it is mentioned that the Islamic Prophet Muhammad, was born in the year known as the Year of the Elephant (approximately equating to 570 CE) in Mecca in pre-Islamic Arabian, and his father, Abdullah ibn Abd al-Muttalib, died before his birth, and he lost his mother at the age of six, and at the age of twenty, he participated in the Battle of Fijar, and at the age of twenty-five, he married Khadija bint Khuwaylid, and at the age of sixty-three, he died of poisoning, and his tomb is in Medina.

The last section of the book is about the genealogy of the descendants of Aqil ibn Abi Talib (an elder brother of Ali). This section mentions that Aqil ibn Abi Talib's nickname is "Abu Yazid" and that he had 18 sons. The final article in the book is about the genealogy of Aqil ibn Abi Talib's grandson, "Ja'far ibn Abdullah ibn Aqil", who died in Harran in 946 CE—334 AH, and the final matter in the book is about his children who lived in Aleppo, Beirut, and Egypt.

== Reception ==
The book "Al-Majdi fi Ansab al-Talibiyyin" enjoyed considerable fame and prestige during the lifetime of its author and was popular in the East and West of the Islamic world. This work is a classic and educational text in Islamic genealogy, and Islamic genealogists consider it obligatory for elders to read it. In many Islamic genealogy books dating back to the fifth and sixth century AH—11th and 12th century AD/CE, the book "Al-Majdi fi Ansab al-Talibiyyin" is cited and quoted. This shows that the author of the book, Ibn Sufi, was trusted by other genealogists of the time.

== Name ==
The book "Al-Majdi fi Ansab al-Talibiyyin" is Ibn Sufi's most important book, written in the study of the lineage of the family of the prophet of Islam Muhammad, and the Shiite Imams. Ibn Sufi traveled to Egypt in 1051 AD/CE (443 AH), where he presented some of his works to "Majd al-Dawlah Abul-Hassan Ahmad" (president of the House of Wisdom of the time), during the Fatimid Empire. "Abu Talib Muhammad", the son of "Majd al-Dawlah Abul-Hassan Ahmad", asked Ibn Sufi to write a brief book on genealogy. Ibn Sufi also attributed the book to him in recognition of the kindness of "Majd al-Dawlah" and called it "Al-Majdi" in the first phrase of the book name which means "Attributed to Majdi" or "Dedicated to Majdi". So, the book name «ألمَجدی فی أنسابِ الطّالبیّین» literally means "Dedicated to Majdi in the Lineages of the Talibis Peoples". "Talibis Peoples" was a family tree in an Arab clan within the Quraysh tribe to which the Islamic prophet Muhammad Ibn Abdullah belonged. In fact, "Talibis Peoples" refers to Abi Talib's lineages and descendants.

This book is known among Islamic genealogists as the abbreviated name of "Al-Majdi".

== Sources ==
In old Arabic manuscripts, after each matter, it was stated who and from what source the matter was quoted or narrated. This action was called "Quoting" or "Narrating" (in Arabic: نَقل، رِوایَت). "Narrating" also means word-of-mouth transmission. In ancient Arab times, the credibility of a manuscript depended on the quotes and narrations it used. If the narrator was known in society as a truthful and trustworthy person, then his statement would be considered as a valid proof. Therefore, the manuscripts that referred to reliable people and materials enjoyed a special reputation.

The book "Al-Majdi fi Ansab al-Talibiyyin" has many citations from reliable and trustworthy persons and matters in the field of genealogy. So, the book "Al-Majdi fi Ansab al-Talibiyyin" was famous in Islamic world among genealogists because of its reliable narrations and it's trustworthy author. Ibn Sufi, the author of the book "Al-Majdi fi Ansab al-Talibiyyin", used the narrations he gave through his father, "Ibn Mahlabiyah", and through "Ubaydoli" (a reliable prominent genealogist). In the book "Al-Majdi fi Ansab al-Talibiyyin", the author has narrated from the books, manuscripts, and commentaries belonging to the following individuals too:

1. Muhammad ibn al-Qasim al-Nassaabah
2. Sharif Dandani Al-Nassaabah
3. Abu al-Faraj al-Isfahani, the prominent author of the books Maqātil aṭ-Ṭālibīyīn and Kitāb al-Aġānī
4. Abu Abdullah Safawani
5. Abul Hassan Ishnaani
6. Usman ibn Mintaab
7. Ibn Khuda'
8. Shabel ibn Makin
9. Ali ibn al-Hussain ibn Tarif
10. Abu Udai al-Dhara'
11. Ibn Abi Jazi al-Basari
12. Yahya ibn al-Hassan al-Nassabah
13. Samaki
14. Abu Bakr Muhammad ibn Abdat al-Abqasi al-Tarsusi
15. Sahl ibn Abdullah ibn Dawud al-Muhri Al-Bukhari
16. Ibn Dinar
17. Ibn Ma'iyah
18. Ahmad ibn Ali ibn Ibrahim ibn Muhammad ibn al-Hassan ibn Muhammad al-Jawani

== Manuscripts ==
The book "Al-Majdi fi Ansab al-Talibiyyin" was originally a manuscripts on the ancient handwriting paper. In fact, there have been several manuscripts of it. Some of the book's manuscripts have become defective and worn out over time, or have been burned in the fanatic conflicts. The surviving manuscripts which remains in the world include:

1. The copy in the "Central Library of Astan Quds Razavi", in the city of Mashhad, Iran, which revived in 1952.
2. Defective copy in the library of "Seyyed Ahmad Rozati Isfahani" in the city of Isfahan, Iran.
3. A complete academic modern style version which revived and republished by Mahmoud Mar'ashi Najafi, which is available in the Iran book markets.
4. The last new edition in the "Ayatollah Marashi Najafi Library" in the city of Qom, Iran.
5. A defective copy which is in the "New York Public Library", USA, registered there under number 51936.

=== 1989 edition ===
In 1989 AD/CE (1409 AH), all the available original Arabic manuscripts of the book "Al-Majdi fi Ansab al-Talibiyyin" were collected and revived in the city of Qom (the headquarters city of the Islamic scholars in Iran), and a modern-style academic version was republished with an introduction, commentaries, footnotes, and an afterword which is written by various experts. In this version, the main genealogy matters comes in Arabic language same as the original manuscripts sources, but it is a multi-language version which has many parts such as introduction, commentaries and afterword which comes in Persian language.

In the famous version of this book which is available in the Iranian book markets, the introduction was written by Mahmoud Mar'ashi Najafi (an Iranian librarian, Bibliographer and manuscript expert), in which he describes the biography of the author, Ibn Sufi. The researches and guiding commentaries was done by Ahmad Mahdavi Damghani (an Iranian scholar and university professor), and most of the useful footnotes were mentioned by him. There is also a detailed introduction at the beginning of the book and comments and explanations at the end of the book, written by Ahmad Mahdavi Damghani too. The researcher in the field of ancient texts and the person who had an effective role in the revival of Shiite works "Abdulaziz Mohaqqiq Tabatabaei", wrote a separate book in the commentaries of the book "Al-Majdi fi Ansab al-Talibiyyin" too.

== See also ==
- Umdat al-Talib
- Ibn Sufi
- Ibn Inabah
- Salawat
- Islamic honorifics
- Revelation
- Atlas of Shia
- Du'a al-Sabah
