= Karbala'i Kazem Karimi Saruqi =

Karbala'i Kazem
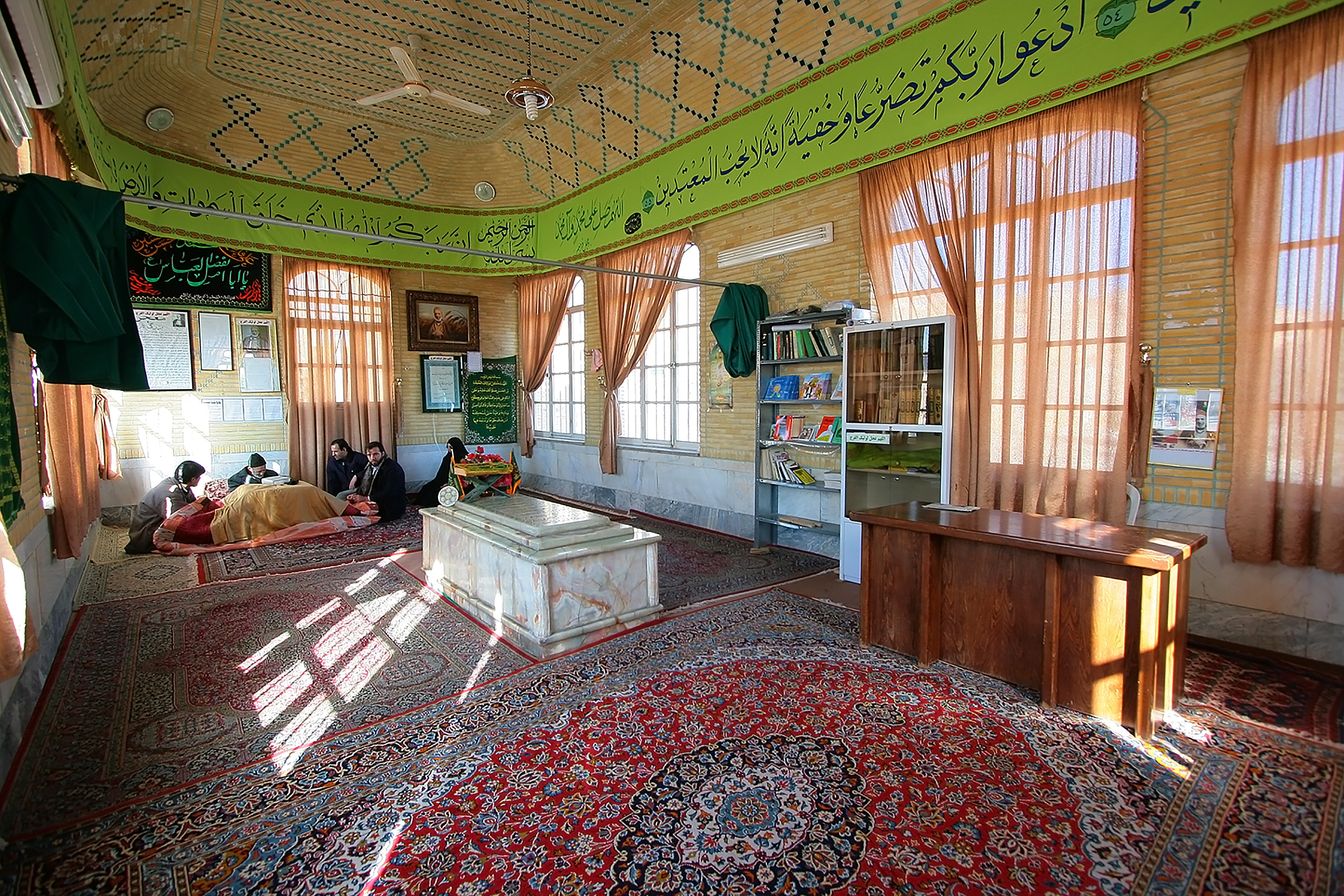
- Born: Arak, Iran
- Died: 1960; Arak, Iran, Iran

Karbala'i Kazem Karimi Saruqi (Persian:کربلایی کاظم ساروقی) (born:1262 SH, Saruq, Markazi Arak, Iran - died 1339 SH, Qom) was an illiterate person and a farmer who, according to a story which was confirmed by some clerics, suddenly became a hafiz of the whole Quran without any official training. He claimed to have received the memorization of the entire book of the Quran in an instant and miraculous manner. His claim was confirmed by many scholars, government officials and academics through tests. According to him, he happened to receive the memorization of the entire Quran all at once at the Saruq Imāmzādeh Haftādodowtan (Imǎmzǎdeh Haftǎdodowtan) which is a local holy shrine or sacred mausoleum. His tomb is located in new cemetery of Qom.

== Meeting with religious scholars ==
Karbalai Kazem had traveled to various cities dealing with various scholars and numerous tests taken from him and this caused several people to confirm him. Including:Seyyed Hossein Borujerdi, Ahmad Khonsari, Sadr al-Din al-Sadr, Mohammad Hadi Milani, Seyed Abdol hoseyn Dastgheyb, Muhammad Husayn Tabataba'i, Naser Makarem Shirazi, Ja'far Sobhani, Ayatollah Haeri Shirazi, Abolghasem Khazali, and others.

Manuscripts from Sayyid Mar'ashi Najafi, Abdullah Musawi Shirazi, Syed Ahmad Zanjani, Naser Makarem Shirazi, in recognition of Karbala'i Kazem and referring to his extraordinary properties there. As well as Seyed Abdol hoseyn Dastgheyb cited in the book of Amazing Stories. What has happened to Karbalai Kazem is proof of non-distortion of the Quran. For example, Mohi al din-Haeri Shirazi by resorting to something that happened to Karbalai Kazem against all claims in book of Mirza Husain Noori Tabarsi to governor Arak, Iran writes : « The manner of checking passages of the falsification done by Karbalayi Kazem can't be done ».

== Properties attributed to him ==
Features that have been identified through various tests are as follow:

- The recitation of the Quran by reading the Ayah number and location
- Reading the Quran verses in reverse order
- Quran in Arabic and Persian language books have been diagnosed with uniform handwriting
- Open the Quran and indicate the location of each print with Quranic verses almost without turning
- Search phrases and words in the Qur'an and the number and location of each repeat
- Expressed a number of letters Surah and information about repeating and ...
- Information on the mysteries of the Quran

== Memorials, Celebrations and Cherish ==
In 1386 SH an international congress for celebration and cherish of him was held. Many scholars and personalities from the Muslim world attended, including: boss of Islamic Council parleman, minister of culture and Islamic guidance and governor of Markazi Province

A stamp commemorating him was unveiled at the congress.

In Ordibehesht 1390SH, the commemoration was held at the shrine of Fātimah bint Mūsā in Qom.
