= Dastgheib =

Dastgheib is a surname. Notable people with the surname include:

- Abdol Hossein Dastgheib (1913–1981), Iranian imam
- Abdolali Dastgheib (born 1931), Iranian literary critic, writer, translator and author
