= Mohammad Ali Naseri =

Iranian religious scholar (1930–2022)

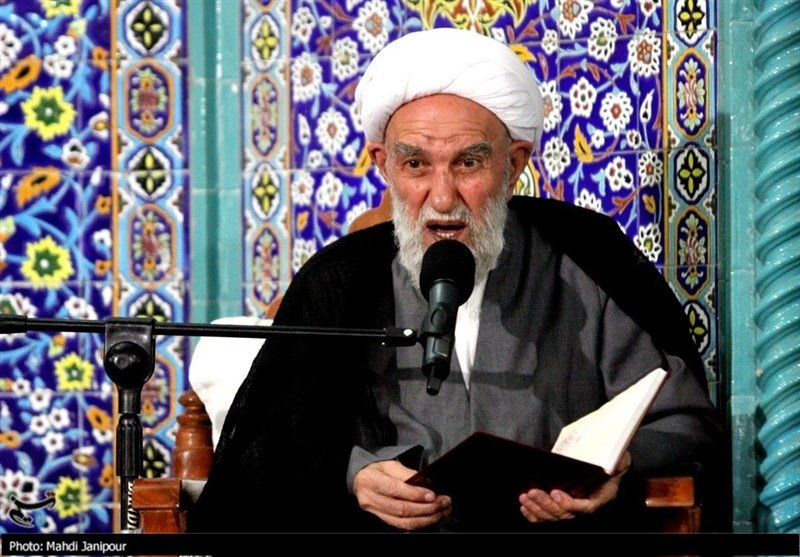

Personal life
- Born: Mohammad Ali Naseri Dowlatabadi; November 25, 1930 Dowlatabad, Borkhar County
- Died: August 26, 2022 (aged 91) Isfahan
- Parent: Mohammad Bagher (father)
- Education: Ayatollah

Religious life
- Religion: Islam
- Sect: Shia; Twelver

Muslim leader
- Teacher: Abu al-Qasim al-Khoei, Mirza Hashem Amoli, Sheikh Abbas Quchani

Mohammad Ali Naseri Dowlatabadi (November 25, 1930, in Dowlatabad – August 26, 2022, in Isfahan), was an Iranian mujtahid, a promoter of Mahdism, and one of the moral scholars of Isfahan seminary. He acquired knowledge from people such as Mohammad Kufi, Seyyed Mohammad Keshmiri, Hashem Haddad, Seyed Jamaluddin Golpayegani, Muhammad Husayn Tabataba'i, Mohammad Ismaeel Doulabi and Modarres Afghani, and especially in practical mysticism, he was a special student and guardian of Sheikh Abbas Quchani.

On 14 February 2012, Sean Stone, an American actor and filmmaker who traveled to Iran, converted to Islam at Mohammad Ali Naseri's house.

== Death ==
He died on 26 August 2022 at the age of 92 after enduring a period of illness. Following his death in Isfahan, three days of public mourning were announced. He was laid to rest in the Golestan Shohada cemetery in Isfahan.

== See also ==
- Abbas Quchani
- Hassan Bagheri
- Mojtaba Khamenei
- Ali Qoddusi
- Fathi Razem
- Mohammad Javad Ansari Hamedani
- Mohammad Ali Shah Abadi
- Mirza Javad Agha Tehrani
- Seyed Abolhassan Shams Abadi
- Ali ibn Muhammad Alawi Umari
- Salawat
- Umdat al-Talib
- Islamic honorifics
- Revelation
- Mohammad Behbahani
- Agha Hossein Khansari
- Ahmad ibn Isa ibn Zayd
- Ahmad ibn Ishaq Ash'ari Qomi
- Aqa Najafi Quchani
- Atlas of Shia
- Du'a al-Sabah
- Ehya night
- Baha ad-Din ibn Shaddad
