= Abbas Quchani =

Iranian religious scholar

Ayatollah Abbas Quchani
- عباس قوچانی
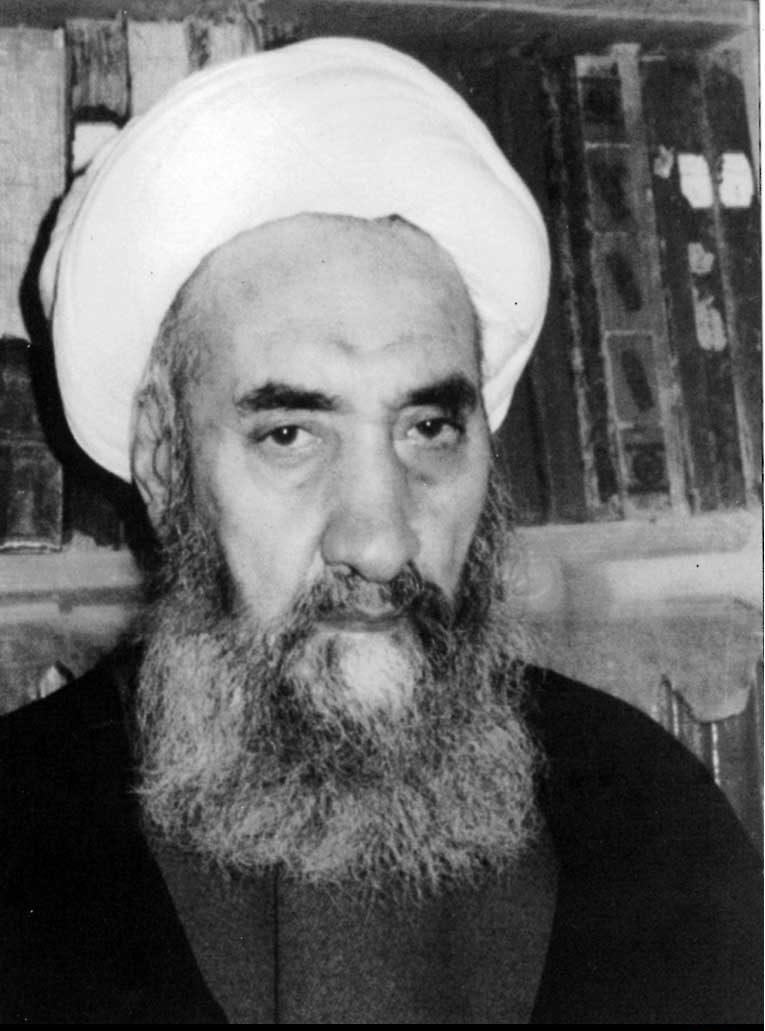

Personal life
- Born: Abbas Hatef Quchani; 1913 Quchan, Qajar Iran
- Died: March 21, 1990 (aged 76–77) Najaf, Ba'athist Iraq
- Resting place: Wadi-us-Salaam
- Children: 4
- Known for: Mystic Guardian of Seyyed Ali Qazi

Religious life
- Religion: Islam
- Sect: Shia
- Creed: Twelver

Muslim leader
- Teacher: Seyyed Ali Qazi
- Students: Mohammad ali Naseri DolatAbadi(محمد علی ناصری دولت آبادی)

Abbas Hatef Quchani (1913, - March 21, 1990) was an Iranian mujtahed, jurist and one of the contemporary Shia mystics. He was a disciple and mystic guardian (lit. 'Someone who inherits the spiritual knowledge of a master after his death') of Seyyed Ali Qazi.

== Biography ==
Abbas Quchani (born in 1292 SH, 1333 AH, 1913 AD/CE, Gozalabad village of Quchan County, Razavi Khorasan province), completed his religious elementary education in Quchan and Mashhad and then he studied higher education in jurisprudence in Najaf under the supervision of Muhammad Hossein Gharavi, Abu al-Qasim al-Khoei and Agha Bozorg Shahidi (Sage and jurist who died 1355 AH, 1936 AD/CE) Quchani was one of the companions of Ayatollah Khoei and was under the consultation of him. Quchani was allowed to ijtihad by the authorities of Najaf, including Abd al-Hadi al-Shirazi, Jamaluddin Golpayegani, Khoei and Muhsin al-Hakim, and Seyyed Ali Qazi also approved his ijtihad. In Najaf, he was engaged in teaching jurisprudence, Islamic principles and philosophy (such as famous Islamic book Manzoomeh Sabzevari). He taught several courses on the book Asfar. He had such a strong memory that memorized some complex jurisprudential or philosophical texts. Due to his insistence on staying in Najaf, he spent the last three years of his life alone and died on Wednesday, March 21, 1990 (23 Sha'ban 1410 AH) and was buried in Wadi-us-Salaam, Najaf. He was survived by 2 sons and 2 daughters.

== Spiritual conduct ==
Quchani was interested in spiritual matters from the beginning of his education. When he was in Mashhad, he practically conducted without a teacher and endured religious austerities. Among them, he fasted for three whole years, after which he experienced spiritual feelings and tenderness of the soul, special dreams and a feeling of physical lightness. Due to these changes in himself, he became physically ill and realized that he should conduct under the guidance of a master. In his search for a master, he was guided to Hassan Ali Nokhodaki Isfahani and Quchani was influenced by his moods and actions. In Najaf, under the guidance of Mohammad-Taqi Bahjat Foumani, Quchani found his master, Seyyed Ali Qazi, and was his assistant for 14 years. After six years of being in the Qazi's presence, he felt that the master was watching him with spiritual mastery and was aware of his condition, so he took care of himself more. Quchani was so much a companion and fellow traveller of his master, Qazi, that others trainees would ask him the meaning of some of the master's courses, and he also had a special position and dignity with the master. His master, Qazi, would express some of his special situations to Quchani, and ultimately, his works, letters and mystical will inherited by Quchani after his death.

== Works ==
Due to the will of his master Qazi, Quchani did not write any works of his own. But he corrected the famous Islamic jurisprudence book Javaher al-Kalam during ten years of research. Quchani compiled a complete book from lectures and courses of master Khoei too.

== Disciples ==
Mohammad Hossein Hosseini Tehrani conducted under the courses of Quchani by the order of Muhammad Husayn Tabataba'i. Also, Abdul Qaem Shushtari, Seyyed Hassan Qazi (son of the great Qazi), Mohammad Saleh Kameili Khorasani, Seyed Abdul Karim Keshmiri, Mohammad Ali Naseri Dowlatabadi, Hassan Safi Esfahani, Mohammad Taqi Araki, Seyed Ali Milani, Mohaghegh Bonyani, and Nazaar Bahrani were among the disciples of Quchani.

🟢 Abbas Quchani had about two or three more main students due to anonymity, one of them was his own son, the other was Mr. Safi, and the last one who was the most talented was Mohammad Ali Naseri Daulatabadi, who finally succeeded Erfani Quchani.

== See also ==
- Mohammad Ali Naseri
- Mohammad Behbahani
- Muhammad Husayn Tabataba'i
- Aqa Najafi Quchani
- Mohammad Javad Ansari Hamedani
- Mohammad Ali Shah Abadi
- Mirza Javad Agha Tehrani
- Seyed Abolhassan Shams Abadi
- Ibn Inabah
- Ali ibn Muhammad Alawi Umari
