= Al-Muzaffar =

Al-Muzaffar (Arabic: المظفر, lit. 'the victorious') may refer to:

- Mu'nis al-Muzaffar (845/6–933), a eunuch and the leading Abbasid general of the early 10th century
- Abd al-Malik al-Muzaffar (975–1008), prime minister (hajib) of the Caliphate of Córdoba from 1004 to his death
- Habbus al-Muzaffar, ruler of the taifa of Granada (1019–1038)
- Al-Muzaffar I Umar (died 1191), Ayyubid Emir of Hama (1179–1191), viceroy of Egypt (1181–1185) and general under Saladin
- al-Muzaffar Ghazi (died 1247), Ayyubid ruler of Mayyafariqin (1220–1247)
- Mozaffar ad-Din Shah Qajar (1853–1907), fifth Qajar shah of Persia (1896–1907)
- Muhammad Rida al-Muzaffar (1904–1964), Shia Marja'

== See also ==
- Muzaffarids
