= Mohammad Sadeqi Tehrani =

Grand Ayatollah Mohammad Sadeqi Tehrani
- Born: 21 March 1926; Tehran, Imperial State of Iran
- Died: 21 March 2011 (aged 85); Qom, Iran
- Website: forghan.ir

Grand Ayatollah Mohammad Sadeqi Tehrani (Persian: محمد صادقی تهرانی; 1926 – 21 March 2011) was an Iranian Twelver Shi'a Marja. He has studied in seminaries of Qom, Iran under Grand Ayatollah Ruhollah Khomeini and Muhammad Husayn Tabataba'i. He died on 21 March 2011, at the age of 85.

== Biography ==
Ayatollah Mohammad Sadiqi Tehrani, the writer of Tafsir Al-Furqan, was born in Tehran in 1926.

His father was one of the most famous orators of Iran. He used to speak vociferously against Reza Shah Pahlavi, the first Pahlavi monarch of Iran, during whose regime he was challenged and attacks were attempted on him.

Ayatollah Sadiqi entered the Islamic Seminaries at the age of 14 and since that time he began to take active part in amalgamation of cultural and political activities.

He attended the lectures of Ayatollah Sheikh Mohammad Ali Shah Abadi in Tehran for a year. During the same period, he also took active part in attainment of knowledge from great masters of the time like Mirza Mahdi and Mirza Ahmad Ashtiani, and acquired deep knowledge of Quranic interpretation by attending lectures of Ayatollah Shah Abadi and confirmed it with Ayatollah Allama Tabataba'i, the writer of Tafseerul - Mizan, in Qom.

He learnt Islamic Jurisprudence from a number of jurists, the greatest among whom was Ayatollah Borujirdi. He was able to attain the stage of professorship (ijtihad) at the age of twenty.

Thereafter Ayatollah Sadiqi attended lectures of Ayatollah Khomeini in philosophy and ethics and returned to Tehran after ten years of education and teaching.

There he seconded Ayatollah Kashani in the Iranian Revolution. During all this period, he was also busy in teaching Islamic studies when he obtained doctorate in Islamic Studies and master's degree in four other subjects, law being one of them. He attended lectures in Jurisprudence and Mysticism delivered by Ayatollah Sheikh Mohammad Taqi Amoli as well as philosophical lectures of Ayatollah Rafi'e Qazvini.

After ten years of political struggle and teaching Quran interpretation in Tehran, he was invited by the eminent scholars of Qom to attend an important meeting which was going to be held in commemoration of the first anniversary of Ayatollah Borujirdi's death. He attended that meeting and delivered an emotional speech in which he addressed and blamed the Shah, and disclosed his oppressive policies. This speech which was about one year before 51st Khordad uprising, has accelerated Ayatollah Khomaini's struggle against the regime.

Following that, he was prosecuted by the (SAVAK) and was sentenced to death penalty for four times by an absence ballot. This situation forced him to a clandestine emigration to Mecca in 1961 where he succeeded to increase his struggle against the regime.

Thereafter he lectured against the Mohammad Reza Pahlavi during Hajj performance and was consequently imprisoned at Mecca owing to joint conspiracy of shah and the Saudi regime but after the protest of 04 prominent scholars of Iran and Iraq was released.

After his release he migrated to Najaf in order to coach people in educative and Quranic revolution. He could not stay more than ten years in Najaf where his activities for bringing about political Quranic revolution accelerated and finally was forced to leave for Lebanon where he stayed for five years and then proceeded to Mecca again and during two years' stay he continued to impart knowledge of Quranic interpretation and jurisprudence.

He was the second Shi'a scholar to impart knowledge in the "Masjidul - Haram" after Ayatollah Bahrul - Uloom. He occupied an eminent pulpit behind the "Maqam-e Ibrahim" where more than six hundred students from various Islamic countries attended his lectures. Although the education imparted by him did not last long, nevertheless he arranged peaceful debates with the Scholars of Mecca and Madina and convinced all of them by his strong Quranic arguments.

Finally, he was arrested again and exiled from Mecca owing to his educative and political activities and returned to Beirut.

After his three months' stay in Beirut and 71 years of exile from Iran he returned to uphold the revolution and aid Ayatollah Khomeini in establishment of the Islamic Republic. A few months after the Iranian Revolution, he arrived back in Qom for teaching Quran and Jurisprudence. His lectures were wholly based on the Quran, uninfluenced by view points of any scholar except in the case there is no contradiction with the Quran.

He has about 110 works on various subjects. His main Quranic work is an exegesis titled Tafsir Alforqan (in three volumes). Ayatollah Allama Tabataba'i.e., the most famous exegete of Quran wrote a commendation for it saying: "This exegesis is our glory and honour."

He also published critique books on the Bible such as Aqaidona (our beliefs), Al - Moqarinat, and Rasool - ul - Islam.

He was an authority in all fields of Islamic studies such as Exegesis, Jurisprudence, and Philosophy.

He issued 45 verdicts which are in contrast with popular opinions of Shi'as and Sunnis, (Most of his unique verdicts are collected in a book titled Tabsiratul - Fuqaha).

He finished teaching two terms of Jurisprudence with the centrality of Quran for the first time in Islamic Jurisprudence that its second term has lasted six years and the third term with the title of "A Comparative Study of Religions and Sects in the light of Quran & Sunna".

Also, a full course of Quranic jurisprudence in all subjects of Islamic jurisprudence has been recorded.

He made vigorous criticisms of the prevailing philosophy in the Islamic seminaries and beliefs that the main foundations of philosophy are inconsistent with the Quran and Sunna. Moreover, he challenged Western and Eastern philosophers in a book titled Talks between Monotheists and Materialists.

== See also ==
- List of maraji
- List of ayatollahs
