= Muhammad Hossein Gharavi =

Iraqi-Iranian faqih and poet (1879–1942)

Ayatollah Mohammad Hossein Gharavi Esfahani
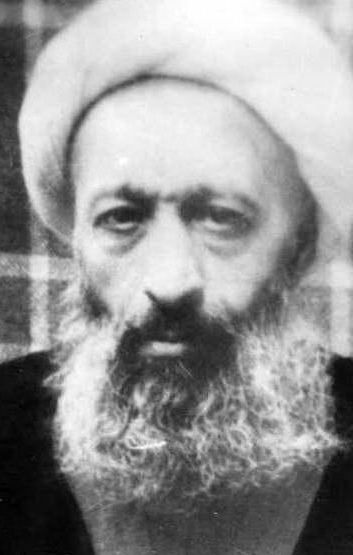

Personal life
- Born: 1879 Kadhimiya, Iraq
- Died: 1942 (aged 62–63) Najaf, Iraq
- Resting place: Imam Ali Shrine, Najaf
- Main interest(s): Islamic philosophy, jurisprudence, Usul al-Fiqh

Religious life
- Religion: Islam
- Jurisprudence: Twelver Shia Islam

Mohammad Hossein Gharavi Esfahani (Arabic: محمد حسين الغروي الأصفهاني) (1879-1942) was an Iranian Shia Scholar, philosopher, jurist and poet.

== Early life and family ==
He was born on 2 Muharram 1296 AH (1879) in Kazemeyn, Iraq. He was the son of Mohammad Hassan who was originally from Nakhjavan, Iran. His father was powerful and wealthy so he used that power to educate himself very well. After the Treaty of Turkmenchay, his father moved to Tabriz. then Isfahan and kazemeyn.

== Education ==
He gained his basic education from Hassan Tuyserkani and, aged twenty, migrated to Najaf to acquire knowledge.

== Teachers ==
His teachers included Akhound Khorasani, Mohqiq, Muhammad esfahani, Mohammad Bagher Estahbanati, Ahmad Shirazi, Muhammad Tabatabaei Fasharaki, and Aqa Reza Hamadani.

== Students ==
His students included: Mohammad Ali Araki (his son-in-law), Mohammad Ali Ordubadi, Nasrollah Eshkavari, Abdul Hosein Amini, anvari Hamadani, Mohammad Taqhi Bahjat, Yousef Biyari, Sadr Al din JAzaeri, Muhammad Rida al-Muzaffar, Hadi Milani, Hossein hamadani Najafi, Abu al-Qasim al-Khoei, Mohammad Hossein Tabatabaei, Mortaza Modrresi Chahardehi, sayyed hadi Khosrow Shahi, Abd al-A'la al-Sabziwari.

== Works ==
His books include:

- Discussions of Usul
- Treatise on the fast
- Anwar al Quddusiyyah
- The Prize of man of wisdom (Tohfat Al Hakim)
- Notes on Makaseb
- The end of understanding in principles (Nahayah Al-Derayah)

== Death ==
He died in 1942 and was buried in a room nex to Imam Ali's Shrine in Najaf City. al-Allama al-Hilli and Mostafa Khomeini are both buried in that place too.

== See also ==
- Abbas Quchani
- Contemporary Islamic philosophy
- Fiqh
- Islamic philosophy
- List of Islamic studies scholars
