= Hasan Ali Nejabat Shirazi =

Ayatollah Hajj Sheykh Hasan Ali Nejabat Shirazi
- حسنعلی نجابت شیرازی
- Title: Ayatollah

Personal life
- Born: Shiraz, Iran; 1917 Shiraz, Iran
- Died: 28 April 1989 (aged 71–72) Shiraz, Iran
- Resting place: Shah Cheragh
- Main interest: Mysticism
- Education: Najaf Hawza

Religious life
- Religion: Islam
- Denomination: Twelver Shia Islam

Muslim leader
- Disciple of: Ayatollah Sayyid Mirza Ali Tabatabaei, Sheykh Muhammad Javad Ansari, Sheykh Muhammad Ali Boroujerd, Sayyed Abul Hasan Esfahani, Sayyed Abdul hadi Shirazi, Sayyed Abul Qasem Khoei

Ayatollah Hajj Sheykh Hasan Ali Nejabat Shirazi (1917-1989) was an Iranian mystic, author of several published theological works, and political activist.

== Early life and education ==
He was born in 1917 at Shiraz, Iran. He passed preliminary and advanced courses in Shiraz and Najaf under supervision of masters.

He was trained under the supervision of grand Masters, including Ayatollah Sayyid Mirza Ali Tabatabaei, Sheykh Muhammad Javad Ansari, Sheykh Muhammad Ali Boroujerd, Sayyed Abul Hasan Esfahani, Sayyed Abdul hadi Shirazi, and Sayyed Abul Qasem Khoei.

== Political and scientific activity ==
He established the religious school followed by the name of his son, ‘’Shahid Mohammad Hossein Nejabat’’. He also had a political activist role during the Islamic revolution of Iran along with Ayatollah Sayyed Hosein Dastgheib against the Pahlavi Regime.

== Selected works ==
His published and unpublished works include:

- Basair or The Holy Quran And Ahle Bayt
- The word of purity (Kalemah Al Tayyebah)
- Divine unity
- The word of love
- Explanation of Rajab Dua
- Explanation of shaban month pilgrimage
- Absolute governing of Jursit (Velayate Motlaqeh Faqih)

== Death ==
He died in 1989, on the night of martyrdom of Imam Ali Al-Naghi in Shiraz..

== See also ==
- List of ayatollahs
