= Mirza Javad Agha Tehrani =

Iranian religious scholar

- میرزا جوادآقا تهرانی
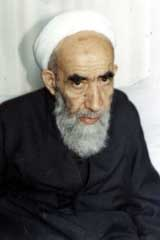

Personal life
- Born: 1904 Tehran, Iran
- Died: October 24, 1989 (aged 84–85) Mashhad, Iran
- Resting place: Behesht-e Reza, Mashhad
- Education: Qom Seminary, Hawza Najaf, Mashhad Seminary

Religious life
- Religion: Islam
- Sect: Shia; Twelver

Muslim leader
- Teacher: Morteza Taleqani; Muhammad Taqi Amoli; Hashem Qazvini; Mirza Mahdi Qaravi Esfahani
- Disciples: Ali Khamenei; Mostafa Ashrafi Shahroudi; Salehi Mazandarani; Ali Asghar Masoumi; Mahdi Ebadi; Mohammad Valeh; Moslem Haeri; Abdoljavad Qaravian; Mahdi Morvarid; Ali Akbar Elahi Khorasani

Mirza Javad Agha Tehrani (1904, Tehran – 1989, Mashhad) was one of the Shia mystics and jurists from Iran. In 1979, he was one of the representatives of the Assembly for the Final Review of the Constitution from Razavi Khorasan province. He is considered a spiritual person in spite of his critical opinion of conventional mysticism and was known as a teacher of ethics. He had a good relationship with Ruhollah Khomeini.

== Antithesis with the conventional mysticism ==
He, like other scholars of the Tafkik Sect, was a critic of conventional Islamic mysticism and even though he was aligned with the revolution from a political point of view, he was against mysticism and Sufism from an intellectual and ideological point of view, and for this reason he was disagreed with Ruhollah Khomeini in some cases. For example, he was sent a message to Khomeini about a request to shut down the mystical interpretation of Al-Fatiha Surah of him that was being broadcast on TV those years. Ruhollah Khomeini accepted the request and shut down the interpretation despite the fact that it had many audiences.

== Educations ==
Mirza Javad Agha Tehrani, after passing the preliminary and part of the level courses in the seminary of Qom, left for Najaf. During his two-year stay in Najaf, he benefited from the presence of scholars such as Morteza Taleghani. Also, in Tehran, he learned the Sharh-e Manzoumeh (a famous book on the Islamic wisdom) under revision of Muhammad Taqi Amoli. After returning to Iran, he went to Mashhad and after completing the level courses of the seminary under revision of Hashem Qazvini, in order to continue his studies abroad of jurisprudence and principles and to familiarize himself with Muhammad Hussain Naini's opinions, he attended the abroad courses of Mirza Mahdi Esfahani (he was a classmate of Hasanali Morvarid). Mirza Javad Agha was greatly influenced by the master in terms of his scientific approach and spiritual behavior. To the extent that, according to Professor Mohammad Reza Hakimi, he became one of the pillars of the Tafkik Sect. Ali Khamenei writes in this regard:

"Most of his education was done in Mashhad and in the course of the late Haj Mirza Mahdi Esfahani (died in 1365 AH) and in addition to jurisprudence in theological and anti-philosophical topics, he also attended the said course and accepted master's thoughts."

After completing scholaric degrees, Mirza Javad Agha Tehrani started teaching abroad of jurisprudence and Quran interpretation at Mirza Jafar School in Mashhad. Mirza Javad Agha lived a very simple life and always wore a small turban and said: "This is enough for my spiritual appearance, and if it was not against custom, I would not wear it."

== Going to the front ==
Despite his old age and in the last years of his life with the same bowed waist, he went to the Iran-Iraq war fronts three times and joined the warriors. Khamenei writes in this regard:

"During the years of imposed war, he repeatedly wore combat uniforms and despite his old age, he became a fugleman and a brave among warrior youths in the field of battle."

== Taking care of the deprived ==
Also, he did not neglect to take care of the needy and the first charity treatment center was established in Mashhad with his guidance and assistance. Also, Iran's first charitable loan fund was launched in Mashhad in 1963 with his efforts. Khamenei said in this regard:

"That noble and pious scholar was truly one of the great and prominent people who spent his life in the service of God and serving the people and fighting for the cause of religion, and he walked the path of gaining God's pleasure with his speech, pen and step. For many years, he enriched Mashhad Seminary with Fiqh, Tafsir, and creed lessons, and blessed many students and scholars."

== Demise ==
Mirza Javad Agha died due to liver disease in the dawn of Tuesday, October 24, 1989, and according to his will, he was buried in Behesht-e Reza cemetery, in Mashhad, with a tombstone without a name or marker.

== His disciples ==
The following people can be mentioned among his disciples:

- Ali Khamenei
- Mostafa Ashrafi Shahroudi
- Salehi Mazandarani
- Ali Asghar Masoumi
- Mahdi Ebadi
- Mohammad Valeh
- Moslem Haeri
- Abdoljavad Qaravian
- Mahdi Morvarid
- Ali Akbar Elahi Khorasani

== His works ==
Among his famous works are:

- Bahaee Che Miguyad? (in Persian: بهایی چه می‌گوید؟, lit. 'What does Baha'i say?', In rejection of the Baháʼí Faith)
- Aref va Sufi Che Miguyand? (in Persian: عارف و صوفی چه می‌گویند؟, lit. 'What do mystics and Sufis say?', In stating the principles of Sufism and conventional mysticism and rejecting it)
- Mizan Al-Mataleb (in Persian: میزان المطالب, lit. 'The balance of demands', In expressing Shia beliefs and also criticizing some philosophers' opinions)
- Falsafeye Bashari va Eslami (in Persian: فلسفه بشری و اسلامی, lit. 'Human and Islamic philosophy', In criticism of materialism and communism)
- Bahsi Piramoone Eslam (in Persian: بحثی پیرامون اسلام, lit. 'A discussion about Islam', In the criticism of Ahmad Kasravi)
- Ayeene Zendegi va Dars'hayee az Akhlaghe Eslami (in Persian: آیین زندگی و درس‌هایی از اخلاق اسلامی, lit. 'Ritual of life and lessons from Islamic ethics', About human life and Islam's contribution to it)

== See also ==
- Mohammad Javad Ansari Hamedani
- Abbas Quchani
- Mohammad Ali Shah Abadi
- Ahmad Khonsari
- Mohammad Ali Naseri
- Mohammad Behbahani
- Muhammad Husayn Tabataba'i
- Mirza Jawad Agha Maleki Tabrizi
- Seyed Abolhassan Shams Abadi
- Ali ibn Muhammad Alawi Umari
