= Mohammad Ali Shah Abadi =

Iranian religious scholar 1872–1949

- محمدعلی شاه‌آبادی
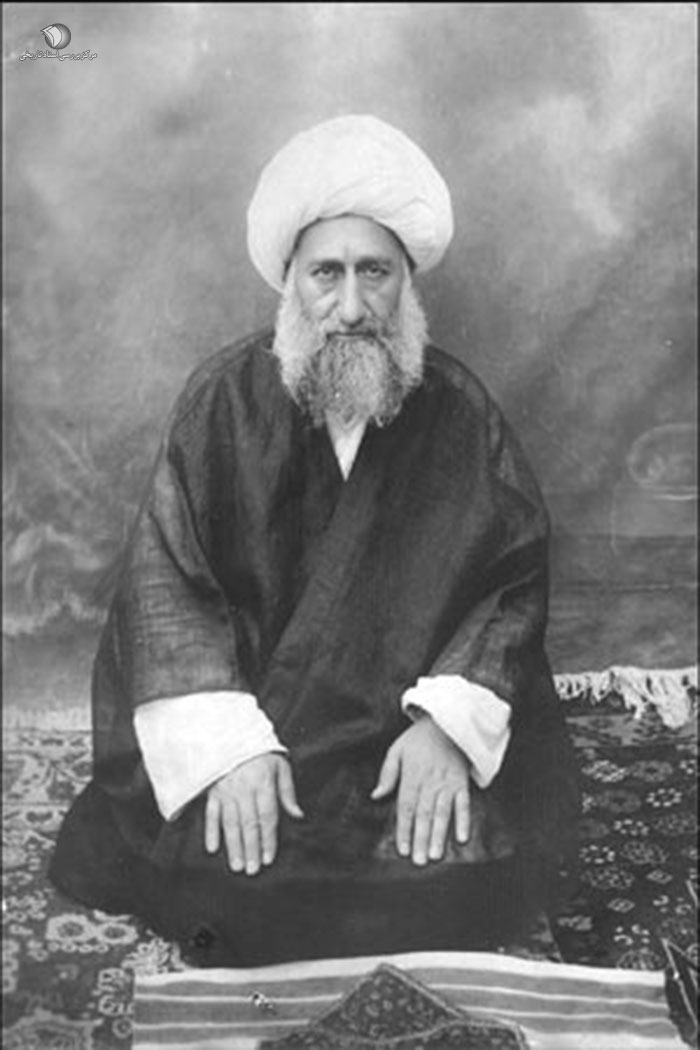

Personal life
- Born: 1872 Isfahan, Sublime State of Iran
- Died: 24 November 1949 (aged 76–77) Tehran, Imperial State of Iran
- Resting place: Abd al-Azim al-Hasani shrine, Ray, Iran
- Children: Nasrallah Shah-Abadi son
- Parent: Mohammad Javad Hossein Abadi Esfahani (father)
- Education: Ayatollah, Ijtihad

Religious life
- Religion: Islam
- Sect: Shia; Twelver

Muslim leader
- Teacher: Mirza Hashem Ashkoori; Muhammad Kazim Khurasani; Mirza Taqi al-Shirazi
- Disciples: Shahab ud-Din Mar'ashi Najafi; Mirza Hashem Amoli; Mohammad Sadeqi Tehrani; Mohammad Reza Tabasi; Mohammad Saqafi Tehrani; Noureddin Esheni Qudejani; Ruhollah Khomeini

Mohammad Ali Bid Abadi Esfahani known as Shah Abadi (1872 in Isfahan – 24 November 1949 in Tehran) was an Iranian mystic and a Shiite mujtahid. He was also famous as Fitra philosopher. He was the son of Mohammad Javad Hossein Abadi Esfahani, (known as Bid Abadi), and Javad, Mohammad, Mahdi, Hossein, Hassan, Abdullah, Abbas, Ruhollah, Nasrollah and Nourullah are his children.

== Educations ==
Mohammad Ali Bid Abadi Esfahani (Shah Abadi) was born in 1872 in Hossein Abad neighborhood of Isfahan. He went to Najaf after his preliminary and level education and learning theoretical mysticism and philosophy under revision of Mirza Hashem Ashkoori. Shah Abadi was disciple of Muhammad Kazim Khurasani and Mirza Taqi al-Shirazi for seven years, and he received permission for ijtihad from these two and three other authorities.

He lived in Tehran from 1912 to 1928 and during this time he was engaged in teaching and leading the congregational prayer. Also, during this period, he had a close relationship with Hassan Modarres. In the last months of his stay in Tehran, he besieged the shrine of Abd al-Azim al-Hasani in protest against Reza Shah's actions, and after that, at the request of Abdolkarim Haeri Yazdi, he left for Qom, where he taught Islamic jurisprudence, principles, and mysticism. Among his most prominent students at this time were Ruhollah Khomeini and Mohammad Kazem Shariatmadari, who studied the texts of theoretical mysticism with him for seven years. In 1935, he went to Tehran again, where he taught and offered congregational prayers.

His efforts in Tehran laid the groundwork for other activities and movements that were continued by religious intellectuals after the Anglo-Soviet invasion of Iran in September 1941. In addition to Islamic jurisprudence and principles, he was also proficient in mathematics and occult sciences and, as the saying goes, the French language.

== His disciples ==
Mohammad Ali Shah Abadi had many disciples, most of whom became famous scholar. including:

- Ruhollah Khomeini
- Shahab ud-Din Mar'ashi Najafi
- Mirza Hashem Amoli
- Mohammad Kazem Shariatmadari
- Mohammad Sadeqi Tehrani
- Abolghasem Gorji
- Abdul Karim Haghshenas
- Abdoldjavad Falaturi
- Musa Mazandarani
- Noureddin Esheni Qudejani
- Mohammad Reza Tabasi
- Mohammad Saqafi Tehrani
- Hassan Ghahremani
- Sayyid Ali Beheshti
- Ruhollah Kamalvand Khorram Abadi
- Khalil Kamarah'i
- Hassan Ahmadi Olunabadi
- Mohammad Ali Rezayi Manesh
- Heydar Aqa Moejeze
- Molla Ali Hamedani
- Seyed Reza Bahaadini

== His works ==
The books he wrote during his life are:

- Shazarat Al-Ma'aref (in Arabic lit. 'The Fragments of Knowledge')
- Rashahat Al-Bihar (in Arabic lit. 'Reflections of The Sea')
- Meftah Al-Sa'adah fi Ahkam Al-Ebadat (in Arabic lit. 'The Key to Happiness in the Rules of Worship')
- Hashieh Nejat Ol-Ebad (in Arabic lit. 'Notes on the Salvation of Servants')
- Manazel Ol-Salekin (in Arabic lit. 'The Steps Ahead of Seekers')
- Hashieh Kefayat Al-Osoule Akhunde Khorasani (in Arabic lit. 'Notes on the Sufficiency of the Assets by Akhund Khorasani')
- Hashieh Fosoul Al-Osoul (in Arabic lit. 'Notes on the Principles Chapters')
- Resalat Al-Aql va Al-Jahl (in Arabic lit. 'Message of the Reason and the Ignorance')
- Tafsiri Moshtamel bar Towhid, Akhlaq va Seiro Soluk (in Persian lit. 'A Commentary Including Monotheism, Ethics and Seeking Behavior')
- Chehar Resaleh Darbareye Nabovvat Ammeh va Khasseh (in Persian lit. 'Four Treatises on General and Special Prophecy')

== Demise ==
Mohammad Ali Bid Abadi Esfahani (Shah Abadi) died on Thursday 24 November 1949 at the age of 77. He was buried in Abd al-Azim al-Hasani's shrine located in Shahr-e Ray.

== See also ==
- Mohammad Javad Ansari Hamedani
- Abbas Quchani
- Ahmad Khonsari
- Mohammad Ali Naseri
- Mohammad Behbahani
- Muhammad Husayn Tabataba'i
- Mirza Javad Agha Tehrani
- Seyed Abolhassan Shams Abadi
