= Muhammad Rida al-Muzaffar =

Philosopher

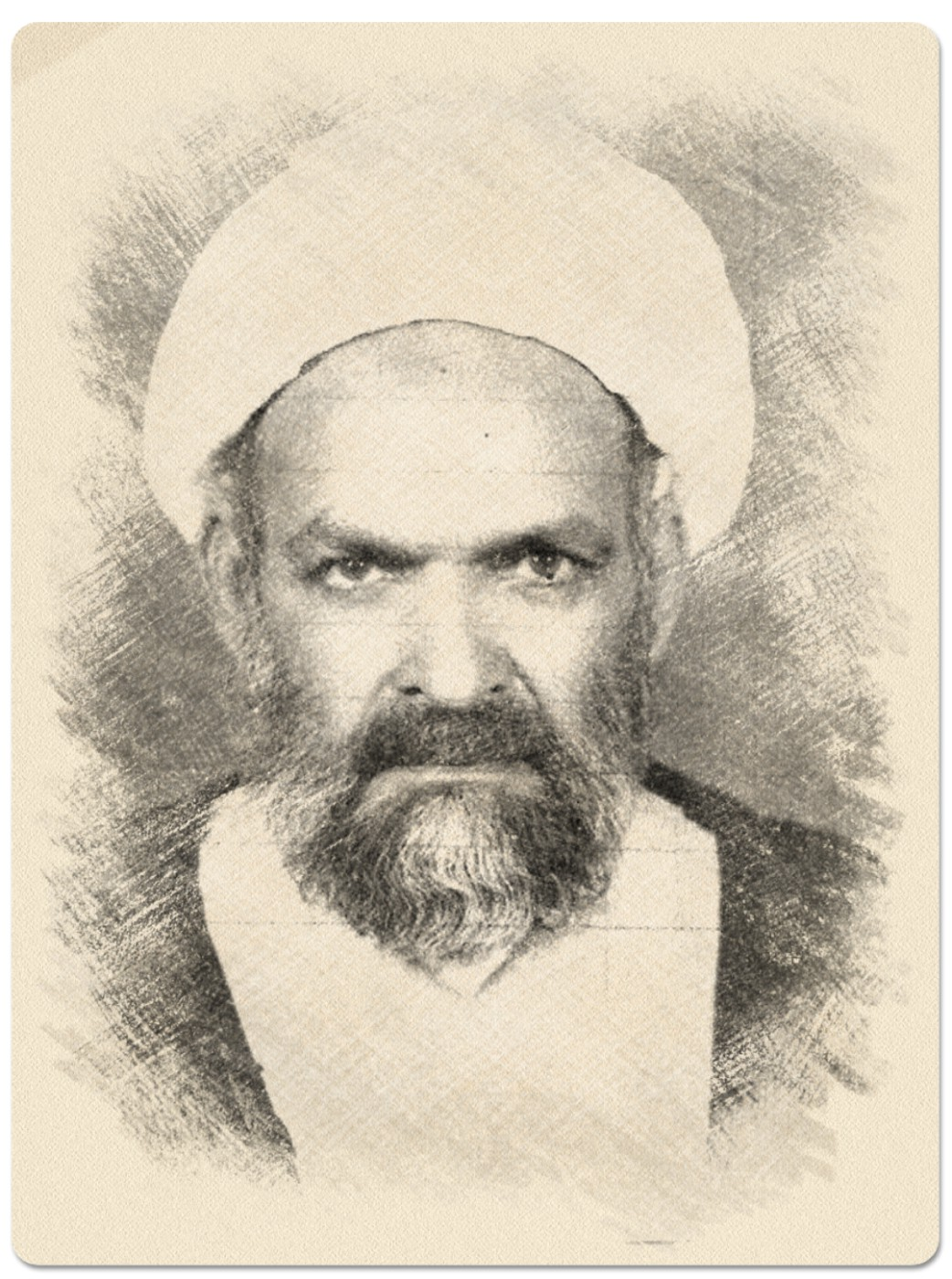
- Born: محمد رضا المظفر; 1904; Najaf, Iraq
- Died: 1964 (aged 60); Najaf, Iraq

Philosophical work
- Main interests: Fiqh, Usul al-Fiqh, Theology, Logic, Islamic philosophy

Muhammad Rida al-Muzaffar (Arabic: محمد رضا المظفر) (1904 - 1964) was a Shia Marja', philosopher and jurist. His book in Islamic sciences is Usul al-Fiqh or the principles of jurisprudence written according to the thought school of Agha Shaykh Muhammad Hosein Isfahani, one of the Shia Marja's.

== Introduction ==
His family by the name of Muzaffar counted as one of eminent families in Najaf. His family includes many scholars and men of religious learning. Most of them are known as Muzaffar in that city since the twelfth century of the Hijrah. Some of his relatives are inhabitants of Basra in Iraq and reside in al-Jaza’ir. His father, named Muhammad ibn Abdullah, a jurist and Mujtahid was a Marja' taqlid. His father was also born and educated in Najaf. He spent his youth in study, his only other activity being prayer and teaching until he had distinguished himself as a jurist. He wrote a very comprehensive commentary on the book of Shara’i al-Islam which he called Tawhid al-Kalam. One of his achievements was establishment of "Montada Al Nashar" or publication of Montada to develop and publicize the most important Islamic books. He also founded the faculty of jurisprudence (fiqh) in Najaf University which includes courses such as comparative fiqh, Shia jurisprudence etc. Eminent scholars like Muhammad Taqi Jafari sought an association with al-Muzaffar.

=== Early life ===
Muhammad Rida al-Muzaffar was born on the fifth of Sha'ban, 1322 AH (1904 AD). Since his father died before him, his brother Abdun-Nabi became responsible for raising him. Muhammad Rida grew up in the scholarly environment of Najaf. Like many ulama, he participated in a variety of courses and scholarly circles, leading to the completion of his advanced education in religious seminaries. His early teachers were his brothers Abdun-Nabi and Muhammad Hasan.

== Scholarly opinions ==
He has many opinions in different domains of Islamic learning like usul al fiqh, logic and fiqh.

=== Usul al-fiqh ===
One of his teachings in the domain of usul is to present new divisions on the subjects of Usul. According to the school of thought of his master, Muhammad Husein Isfahani, Muzaffar believes in new orderness on the subjects. For instance, before him, the subject of Ishtighagh (derivatives) has to discuss in the partition of alfaz not introductions. As a result, he divided subjects into four categories: alfaz, rational discussion (mabahith aqliyyah), hujjat, usul Amaliyyah (practical principles).

== Works ==
- Usul Al-Fiqh
- Al-Mantiq
- Kefayat Al-Osul
- History of Islam
- Philosophy of Avicenna
- Saghifeh
- Philosophy of Imam Ali
- Shaykh Tousi, the establisher of Najaf seminary
- Aqa’ed al-Imamiah’
