= Alfaz (principles of Islamic jurisprudence) =

Principles of Islamic jurisprudence

Alfaz (Arabic: ألفاظ) in the principles of Islamic jurisprudence is a preliminary subject concerned with analysis of words and concepts in religious judgments and sharia. These issues often deal with subjects in the fields of philosophy of language and semantics. The subject is one of the oldest in the Principles of Islamic jurisprudence.

== History ==
The study of alfaz was primarily concerned with the Quran at first and gradually came to be applied to the Sunnah.

Al-Shafi'i was one of the first in thoroughly discussing alfaz. According to Ahmad Pakatchi, Al-Shafi'i in Al-Risala discussed alfaz by taking note of different types of the general ('amm) and the specific (khass), that is, what was universal or particular in the Quran. Also in third century, Ibn Ravandi had written the general and particular essay in which he deal with Alfaz.among the Zaheriah, Davood also refers to need to Alfaz subject. There was many essays among Zaheriah deal with Alfaz such as the book of Al khosus va Omum(the particular and universal) by Abu Ishaq Marvzi. Also there are many essays concerned with Alfaz among Shia like the book of Hisham ibn Hakam which didn’t survive. besides Shaykh Mofid wrote a comprehensive essay on Lafaz. Ibn Zohreh Halabi meanwhile begins the Alfaz with concerning with explaining subjects such as Amr and Nahy, particular and universal.

== Description ==
In Fact Alfaz operate as a theory of designation and denoting. In other words, Alfaz considered as theory of denoting and how we could understand and found the meaning of words particularly religious texts. Alfaz primarily concerned with vocabs and its classification. These concerns are semiotical and samantical issues. For example, Āmidī’s discussed of Alfaz in respect to semantical concepts such as those vowel sounds which have meaning and those which haven't. often discussions of Principles of Islamic jurisprudence divided into four parts which the first one is concerned with linguistic subjects such as designation, use, absoluteness. etc. it seems that Alfaz in principles deals with a common sensical nature. Also there is a relation between Alfaz and hermeneutics.

== Contemporary comments ==
One of the inventions in Alfaz was by Muhammad Baqir al-Sadr. He referred to the precedent of shia Osulis in discussion of Alfaz and the process of its analysis and subjects copula and designations of forms of Alfazs or verbals. Ruhollah Khomeini, according to definition of principles presented by him, believed that most of subjects in Alfaz such as identification of meaning of sentences and conception is out of science of principles.

== See also ==
- Principles of Islamic jurisprudence
- shia islam
