= Ahmad Khonsari =

Iranian Grand Ayatollah (1887–1985)

Grand Ayatollah Seyyed Ahmad Khonsari
- احمد خوانساری
- Ahmad Khonsari (c. 1970s – c. 1980s)

Personal life
- Born: 1887
- Died: 1985 (aged 97–98) Tehran, Iran
- Resting place: Fatima Masumeh Shrine
- Education: Fiqh, Principles of Islamic jurisprudence, Hadith studies, Biographical evaluation

Religious life
- Religion: Shia Islam
- Sect: Twelver
- Profession: Faqīh, Marja'

Senior posting
- Students: Ayatollah Khomeini

Ahmad Khonsari, also Aḥmad Khvānsārī, or Khvunsārī (Persian: احمد خوانساری, 1887–1985) was an Iranian Grand Ayatollah and attained marja status after the death of marja Boroujerdi in 1961. In contrast to the other maraji of his time, who lived in the holy cities of Qom or Najaf, he was based in Tehran, where he ran his own hawza. Khonsari was one of the teachers of Ayatollah Khomeini.

Grand Ayatollah Khonsari came to Qom in 1923 and became one of the leaders of the hawza after the death of Abdul-Karim Ha'eri Yazdi. Together with Mohammad Kazem Shariatmadari and a number of other Iranian Grand Ayatollahs, he was a staunch opponent of the Shah's White Revolution in 1963. But he felt Khomeini's direct challenge of the Shah, claiming to speak for the entirety of Iranian religious leadership, went too far. Khonsari openly criticized Khomeini's behaviour.

Khonsari was a quietist, who believed the clergy should not exercise political power. As such, he opposed Ayatollah Khomeini’s interpretation of the concept of velayat-e faqih.

== Political views ==
Before the Iranian Revolution, Ahmad Khansari was active in opposing the Pahlavi government and supporting the Islamic Revolution. He participated in the Tehran Bazaar protests along with other scholars, during which the protesters were attacked by security forces. He also issued several statements about the revolution, including one after Khomeini's exile to Türkiye. Khansari issued several statements at critical moments; even after the revolution, he continued to share his recommendations and views with the officials of the Islamic Republic.

== Characteristics ==
Ahmad Khansari needed surgery due to gastric ulcer disease, on the other hand, he was old and physically weak, and the surgery had to be performed under anesthesia. Before the surgery, Khansari did not allow the doctors to anesthetize him, because he believed that his consciousness would be endangered. He wanted to perform the surgery while reciting the Quran. Therefore, he said to his treating doctors: "Whenever I am busy reciting Al-An'am Surah, you should perform the surgery, I am paying attention to the Quran, and in this case, no problem will arise." His love for the Quran was so strong that he did not feel any pain by reciting Al-An'am Surah during the surgery and the surgery was completed successfully without the need for anesthesia.

== Works ==
His written works include:

- Jāmiʿ al-Madārik fī al-Fiqh.
- Al-ʿAqāʾid al-Ḥaqqa.
- Ḥāshiya ʿalā al-ʿUrwa al-Wuthqā.
- Manāsik al-Ḥajj.
- Risāla ʿAmaliyya.

== Death ==
Ayatollah Khansari passed away due to illness at the age of 96, in the early hours of Saturday, the , 27 Rabiʿ al-Thani 1405 AH (29 Dey 1363 SH). People in Tehran gathered around his house to mourn his passing. Then his body was transferred to the city of Qom for burial. After the funeral ceremony, in the presence of religious authorities, scholars, and students of the seminary, Ayatollah Golpayegani led funeral prayer over his body, and he was buried in the shrine of Hazrat Fatima Masoumeh in Qom.

== See also ==
- Mohammad Javad Ansari Hamedani
- Mohammad Ali Shah Abadi
- Mirza Javad Agha Tehrani
- Seyed Abolhassan Shams Abadi
- Ibn Inabah
- Ali ibn Muhammad Alawi Umari
