= Seyed Abolhassan Shams Abadi =

Iranian religious scholar (1907–1976)

- سید ابوالحسن شمس‌آبادی
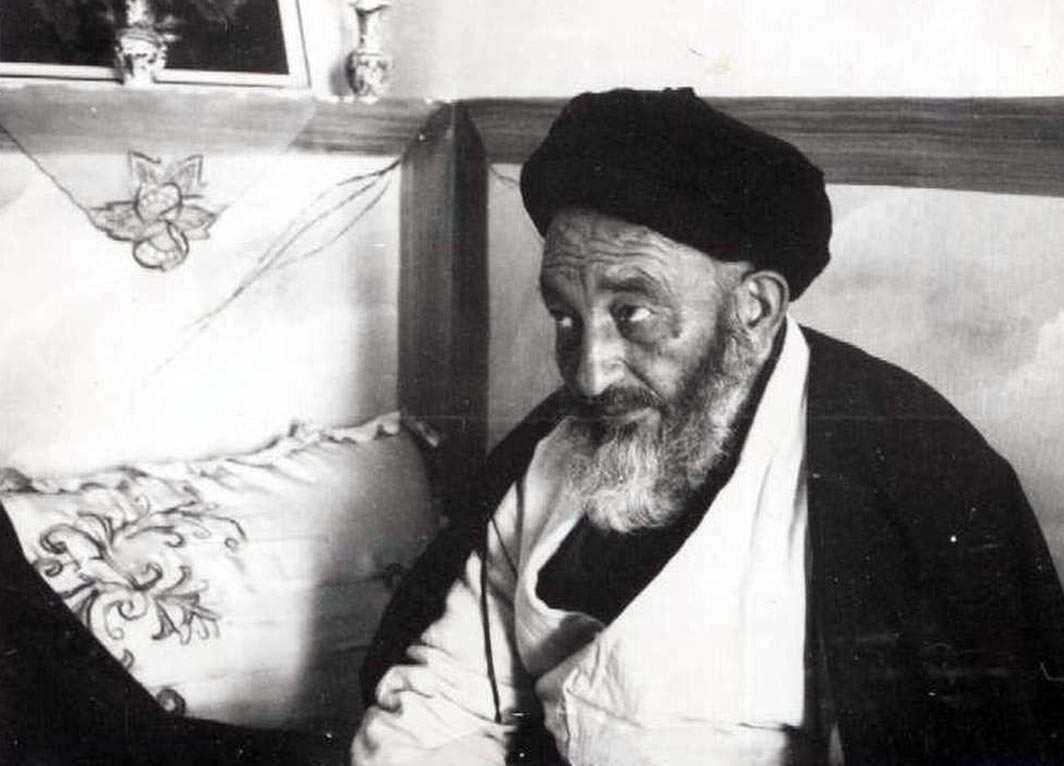

Personal life
- Born: Seyed Abolhassan Ale Rasoul; 1907 Isfahan, Sublime State of Iran
- Died: 7 April 1976 (aged 68–69) Isfahan, Imperial State of Iran
- Resting place: Takht-e Foulad cemetery
- Parent: Mirza Mohammad Ebrahim Mousavi Shams Abadi Mazandarani (father)
- Education: Ayatollah, Ijtihad
- Known for: Imam Zaman Helping Association; Aba Basir School for the Blind

Religious life
- Religion: Islam
- Sect: Shia; Twelver

Seyed Abolhassan Ale Rasoul known as Shams Abadi Mazandarani (1907 – 7 April 1976) was an Iranian cleric and lawyer.

== Life ==
Seyed Abolhassan Shams Abadi was the son of Mohammad Ebrahim Mousavi Shams Abadi Mazandarani, one of the clerics of Isfahan, and a lawyer of Abu al-Qasim al-Khoei. His grandfather, Seyed Mohammad Larijani, the son of Seyed Abdollah Mazandarani, had forty children, all of whom were nobles and owners of Larijan farms, and had left Amol for Isfahan. Seyed Abolhassan Shams Abadi was the son-in-law of Ali Meshkat Sedei, master of Ruhollah Khomeini. Seyed Abolhassan Shams Abadi was one of the mujtahids of Isfahan, who performed congregational prayers in the Sarpol Mosque of Khozan neighborhood in the Khomeyni Shahr city.

== Social and cultural activities ==
After returning from Najaf, Shams Abadi participated in activities such as helping orphans and the poor, and in the establishment and expansion of charitable institutions, such as the Imam Zaman Helping Association, the establishment of Esfahani Pilgrimage Building in Mashhad and Karbala, and the Aba Basir School for the Blind.

== Clergies conflict ==
The conflict between religious groups in Isfahan had very long roots, but at the same time with the politicization of the society and seminaries, this conflict became more visible. One of the important issues of the Isfahan clergy society in contemporary history was the conflict between the scholars who were in two factions; Some were supporters of Rahim Arbab and others were supporters of Morteza Shams Ardakani, Mohammad Ali Movahed Abtahi and Shams Abadi. This contradiction became more visible especially after the 1953 Iranian coup d'état.

The scholars of Isfahan seminary were more inclined to Najaf seminary and under the influence of Abu al-Qasim al-Khoei, they interfered less in political issues. But the scholars of Najafabad seminary were inclined towards Qom seminary and were influenced by the thoughts of Ruhollah Khomeini and Hussein-Ali Montazeri. Some of the elders of Isfahan, such as Shams Abadi, Hossein Khademi, Ali Qadiri Kafrani, Abdol Javad Sedehi, Fayazi and Abbas Ali Adib, believed that Khoei's opinions had priority over Khomeini's opinions and ordered to imitate him.

== Kidnapping and killing him ==
Shams Abadi was abducted and killed by a group attributed to Mehdi Hashemi on his way to the mosque to perform congregational prayers at dawn on 7 April 1976, one day after he returning from Hajj pilgrimage. His body was later discovered near Isfahan in the city of Dorcheh Piaz. A mosque named after him was built in the place where his body was found. He was buried in Takht-e Foulad cemetery in Isfahan.

== See also ==
- Mirza Javad Agha Tehrani
- Mohammad Javad Ansari Hamedani
- Abbas Quchani
- Mohammad Ali Shah Abadi
- Ahmad Khonsari
- Mohammad Ali Naseri
