= Vasileios Syros =

Greek-Finnish historian

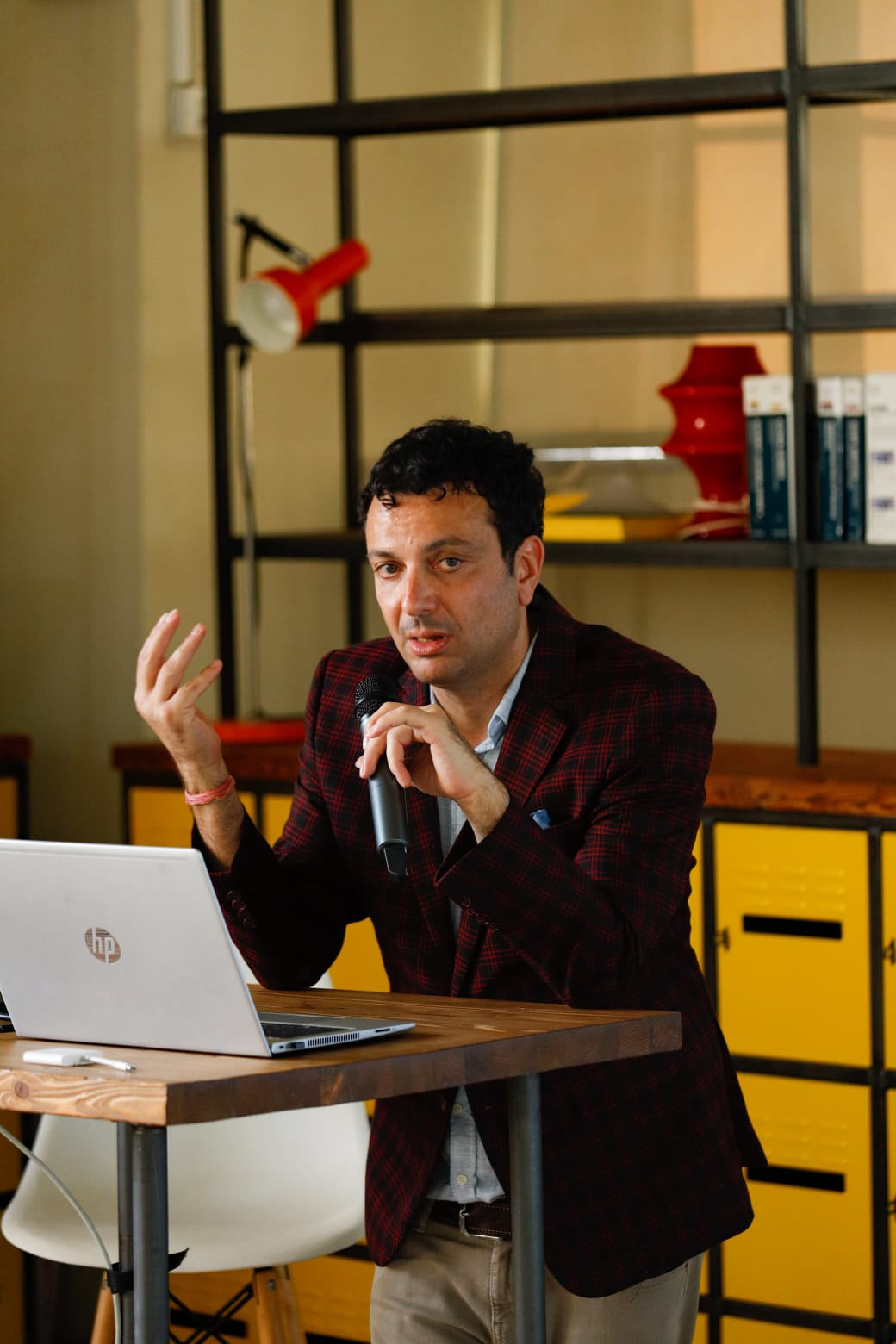
- Education: Heidelberg University

Vasileios Syros (Greek: Βασίλειος Σύρος) is a Greek-Finnish historian of political thought, holder of the Chair of Excellence in Indo-Hellenic Strategic Thought & Statecraft at the Centre for Military History and Conflict Studies at the United Service Institution of India (USI), India's oldest and foremost tri-service think tank (est. 1870) for research into national security and military affairs. He is also Director of the Early Modern Greek Culture Program at The Medici Archive Project in Florence, Italy, Senior Research Fellow at the Institute for European Global Studies at the University of Basel, and Life Member of Clare Hall at the University of Cambridge. His main research and teaching interests lie in the comparative examination of the medieval and early modern Christian, Islamic, and Jewish political traditions. A second cluster of his research looks at intercultural contacts between pre-modern Europe and non-Western societies and polities, especially the Byzantine, Mughal, and Ottoman Empires. Syros also works on the comparative study of diverse models of leadership and cultural diplomacy.

== Career ==
Vasileios Syros obtained his doctorate in medieval and modern history from Heidelberg University. He also studied Jewish intellectual history at the Hochschule für Jüdische Studien Heidelberg and did post-doctoral work on Arabic philosophy at LMU Munich and at the Université Paris 1 Panthéon–Sorbonne as well as on Mughal history at the Jawaharlal Nehru Institute of Advanced Study at Jawaharlal Nehru University (New Delhi, India).

Syros was a junior fellow at the Academy of Finland (2006–2008) and senior fellow at the Finnish Centre of Excellence in Political Thought and Conceptual Change (2006–2011). From 2008 to 2011 he taught as visiting assistant professor of social thought at The John U. Nef Committee on Social Thought, and in 2010, he was appointed Martin Marty Center Senior Fellow at The Martin Marty Center for the Advanced Study of Religion at the Divinity School at the University of Chicago. From 2012 to 2017, he was Academy of Finland Senior Research Fellow. In the Spring of 1993, Syros was a Fellow at the Swedish Collegium for Advanced Study in Uppsala, Sweden. From 2014 to 2018, he directed the research program "Political Power in the Early Modern European and Islamic Worlds" and previously served as principal investigator for the project "Giovanni Botero and the Comparative Study of Early Modern Forms of Government" (2012–2017) under the auspices of the Academy of Finland as well as for the collaborative network "Eurasian Empires, Public Space/Sphere, and Collective Identities at the Threshold of Modernity" under the aegis of the Joint Committee for Nordic Research Councils in the Humanities and Social Sciences (NOS–HS) (2014–2015).

He has taught at Stanford University, McGill University, The University of Chicago, the École Pratique des Hautes Études (Paris), and the University of Navarra (Spain). He was a Lady Davis Visiting professor at The Hebrew University of Jerusalem, a Royal Netherlands Academy of Arts and Sciences Visiting professor at Radboud University Nijmegen, and a Descartes Senior Fellow at Utrecht University. He was Full Professor and Holder of the Greek Chair (under the auspices of the Greek Government) at Jawaharlal Nehru University. He has also taught comparative political theory and cross-cultural leadership at Beijing University and Nankai University (China), Sungkyunkwan University (South Korea), Waseda University (Japan), and Al-Farabi Kazakh National University (Kazakhstan). Syros frequently consults with NATO, OSCE, and government agencies about cultural property protection and crisis management.

Syros is the editor of the book series Edinburgh Studies in Comparative Political Theory and Intellectual History (Edinburgh University Press) and Medieval and Early Modern Europe and the World (Brepols). He serves on the editorial boards of various book series and journals, including Republics of Letters (Stanford University), Comparative Political Theory, and Conatus–Journal of Philosophy.

== Published works ==
- Marsilius of Padua at the Intersection of Ancient and Medieval Traditions of Political Thought (University of Toronto Press, 2012)
- Die Rezeption der aristotelischen politischen Philosophie bei Marsilius von Padua (Brill, 2007)
- Well Begun is Only Half Done: Tracing Aristotle's Political Ideas in Medieval Arabic, Syriac, Byzantine, and Jewish Sources (ACMRS, 2011)
- The Body Politic from Medieval Lombardy to the Dutch Republic. Special issue of Early Science and Medicine 25, no. 1 (2020)
- Η αρχή δεν είναι το ήμισυ του παντός: Ο αριστοτελικός πολιτικός στοχασμός στις μεσαιωνικές αραβικές, συριακές, βυζαντινές και εβραϊκές παραδόσεις, ed. Georgios Steiris; Greek translation by Nikos Tagkoulis and Ioanna Tripoula; foreword by Antony Black (Athens: Institut du Livre A. Kardamitsa, 2020)
- Μεσαιωνική ισλαμική πολιτική σκέψη και σύγχρονη ηγεσία [Medieval Islamic Political Thought and Modern Leadership]. Foreword by Cary J. Nederman. Greek translation by Nikos Tagkoulis (Athens: Papazissis Publishers, 2020)
- Puncte de convergenţă între gândirea politică bizantină şi cea a Evului Mediu Occidental: Eustathios al Thessalonicului despre zorii vieţii sociale şi ai dezvoltării civilizaţiei – Σημεῖα σύγκλισης μὲ τὸν πολιτικὸ στοχασμὸ τοῦ Δυτικοῦ Μεσαίωνα: Ὁ Εὐστάθιος Θεσσαλονίκης γιὰ τὶς ἀπαρχὲς τοῦ κοινωνικοῦ βίου καὶ τὴν ἐξέλιξη τοῦ πολιτισμοῦ, bilingual Greek-Romanian edition, trans. Edith-Adriana Uncu (Bucharest: Editura Omonia, 2021)
- Gândirea politică islamică medievală în dialog cu tradiţia umanistă a Renaşterii italiene [Medieval Islamic Political Thought in Dialogue with the Humanist Tradition of the Italian Renaissance], foreword by Cary J. Nederman. Romanian trans. by Antoaneta Ancuţa Braşoveanu (= Ananta. Studii transdisciplinare) (Iași: Editura Junimea, 2021)
- پزیشکی گالێنی و سەقامگیری کۆمەڵایەتی لە سەرەتای فلۆرێنسی مۆدێرن و ئیمپراتۆرییەتە ئیسلامییەکان [Galenic Medicine and Social Stability in Early Modern Florence and the Islamic Empires], Kurdish trans. by Mahmood Dashti; forewords by Prof. Kosar Mohammad Ali, President of the University of Sulaimani, and Dr. Stavros Kyrimis, Consul General of Greece in Erbil (Sulaymaniyah: Karo Press, 2023)
- Византия между западните градове и източните империи [Byzantium between Western Cities and Eastern Empires], Bulgarian translation by Slava Yanakieva; foreword by H.E. Dimitrios Chronopoulos, Ambassador of Greece to Bulgaria; introduction by Prof. Georgi Kapriev (Sofia: “St. Kliment Ohridski” University Press, 2023)
