= Ibn al-Tiqtaqa =

Iraqi historian (1262–1309)

- ابن الطقطقي
- Born: 1262 CE; Baghdad, Iraq
- Died: 1309 CE
- Occupations: Historian, Naqib of Alids

Academic work
- Era: Medieval Islamic period
- Main interests: Islamic history, Political philosophy
- Notable works: Al-Fakhri

Ṣafī al-Dīn Muḥammad ibn ʿAlī ibn al-Ṭabāṭabā (Arabic: محمد بن علي بن طباطبا العلوي; 1262–1309), also known as Ibn al-Tiqtaqa, was a historian and naqib of Alids in Ḥilla.

He was a direct descendant of Ḥasan ibn Ali ibn Abi Ṭalib. According to E.G. Browne's English version of Mīrzā Muhammad b. ‛Abudi’l-Wahhāb-i—Qazwīni's edition of ‛Alā-ad-Dīn ‛Ata Malik-i-Juwaynī's Ta’rīhh-i-Jahān Gushā (London 1912, Luzac, p.ix), Ibn al-Tiqtaqā's name was Safiyu’d-Din Muhammad ibn ‛Ali ibn Muhammad ibn Tabātabā.

Around 1302 he wrote a popular compendium of Islamic history called al-Fakhri.

According to the political scientist Vasileios Syros, the philosophy of ibn al-Ṭabāṭabā can be compared to that of Niccolò Machiavelli.
