= Mohammad Reza Tabasi =

Iranian scholar

- Born: 1899; Mashhad, Iran
- Died: 18 January 1985 (aged 85–86); Qom, Iran

Academic work
- Discipline: Shia scholar

Mohammad Reza Tabasi (Persian: محمد رضا طبسی) was a Shia Scientist in the fourteenth century AH. He is the son of Mohammad Reza Najafi child of Abbas ibn Ali. He was born in the month of Sha'ban AH 1317 (1989) in Mashhad.

== Education ==
Mohammad Reza Tabasi completed his studies in Mashhad, Qom and Najaf. He was awarded the degree of Ijtihad. His teachers/professors included Muhammad al-Baqir, Mirza Jawad Agha Maleki Tabrizi, Nasrallah Shah-Abadi and Abdul-Karim Ha'eri Yazdi, Abu al-Hasan Isfahani, Muhammad Hosein NĀʾĪNĪ and Sheikh Ziauddin Iraqi."

== Students ==
Some of his prominent students were Morteza Haeri Yazdi (son of Sheikh Abdul-Karim Ha'eri Yazdi), Ali Naghi Monzavi, Muhammad Sodooqi, Ali Davani, and others.

== Death ==
Mohammad Reza Tabasi died at the age of 88 on 28 January 1984, the night of 25 Rabi' al-Awwal 1405 AH. He was buried in Qom."
