= Seyyed Ali Shahidi =

Seyyed Ali Shahidi سيدعلي شهيدي
- Village
- Location within Iran
- Coordinates: 28°23′18″N 56°52′56″E
- Country: Iran
- Province: Kerman
- County: Arzuiyeh
- Bakhsh: Soghan
- Rural District: Soghan

Population (2006)
  - Total: 171
- Time zone: UTC+3:30 (IRST)
  - Summer (DST): UTC+4:30 (IRDT)

Seyyed Ali Shahidi (Persian: سيدعلي شهيدي, also Romanized as Seyyed ʿAlī Shahīdī; also known as Seyyedallī) is a village in Soghan Rural District, Soghan District, Arzuiyeh County, Kerman Province, Iran. At the 2006 census, its population was 171, in 32 families.
