= Ahmad Mahdavi Damghani =

Iranian Islamic scholar (1926–2022)

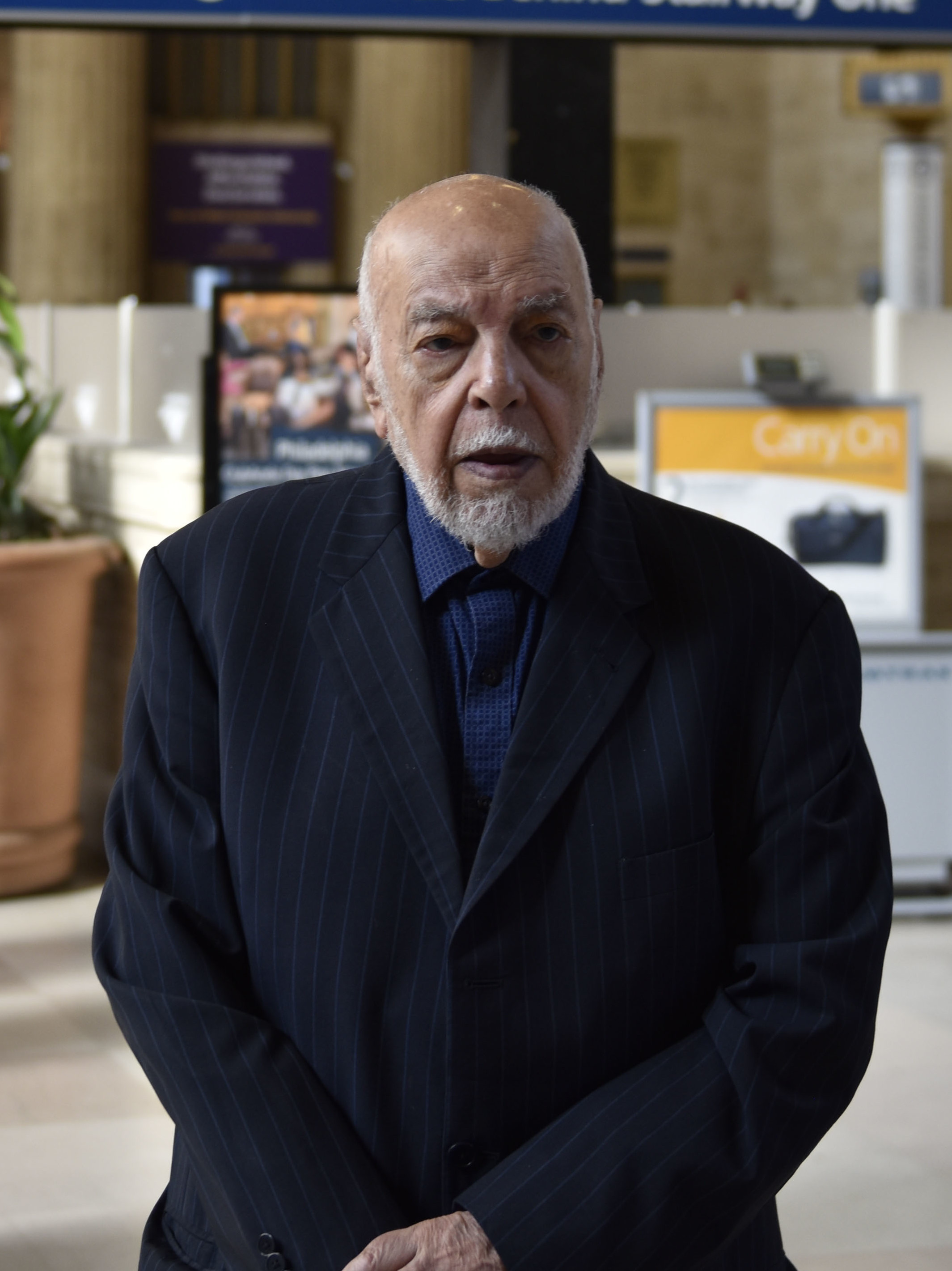
Mahdavi Damghani in 2017

Ahmad Mahdavi Damghani (Persian: احمد مهدوی دامغانی; 5 September 1926 – 17 June 2022) was an Iranian scholar and university professor.

== Biography ==
Born in Mashhad, Iran, on 5 September 1926, he held a Ph.D. in Persian Literature and a Ph.D. in Islamic Theology from Tehran University, where he was a professor at the School of Literature and at the School of Theology between 1962 and 1985. Beginning in 1987, he taught Islamic sciences, Islamic literature, advanced Arabic and Persian Sufi texts, and Islamic philosophy at Harvard University and the University of Pennsylvania. Mahdavi Damghani also taught at the Autonomous University of Madrid for three years.

== Selected works ==
He is the author of over 300 articles in scholarly journals and of several books including:

- Kashf al-Haqa'iq (Unveiling the Truths)
- Al-Majdi (On the Genealogy of the Prophet Muhammad's Family)
- Nasmat al Sahar - A History of Arab Shi`a Poets, Three volumes
- The Sources of Arabic Poems in the Kalilah wa Dimna
- The Garden of Light: An Anthology of Sana`i's Hadiqah
- Kashf al-Haqa'iq 2 (Return of the Kashf)
- The sources of Arabic Poems in “Marzban-Nameh”, 1970s
- “Haasele Owqat” (A collection of assays and articles -1007 pages), 2002–2003
- Tarjumaye Ashaar Arabiye “Saadi” beh Farsi (Translation of “Saadi’s” Arabic poems into Persian), 2004
- Tchahr Maqaleh dar bareh “Amir-al-mumenin Ali Aleyh-al-salam” (Four articles regarding “Amir-al-mumenin Ali Aleyh-al-salam”), 2004–2005
- Maqalati “Dar Hadithe Digaran” (Articles in memory of his professors, friends, and others), 2005
- Taswib Aghlate Tchapi Tafsir, “Kashf-al-asrar” (Correction of erratum in the printed book of “Tafsir Kashf-al-asrar”), 2007
- Dar babe “Khizr” (Regarding “Khizr“), 2007
- “The Noble Princess Shahrbanu” The mother of the Imam Ali b. al-Husain al-Sajjad” Mirror of heritage (Ayene-ye Miras), 2009
- “In the Memory of Companions and Rain Drops“, (Yadeh Yaran va Qatreh hayeh Baran) A collection of his various articles, 2011
- Yad-E-Azizan Dar Bargri-Zan (21 Articles Ettelaat Presse), 2015
- Divan Khazen (Distinguished poet 4th century Hegir Miras-E-Maktoub), 2015
- Essays in Islamic Philology, History and Philosophy, 2016
