= Muhammad Husayn Tabataba'i =

Iranian scholar, theorist, philosopher (1903–1981)

ʿAllāmeh Muhammad Husayn Tabataba'i
- سید محمدحسین طباطبائی
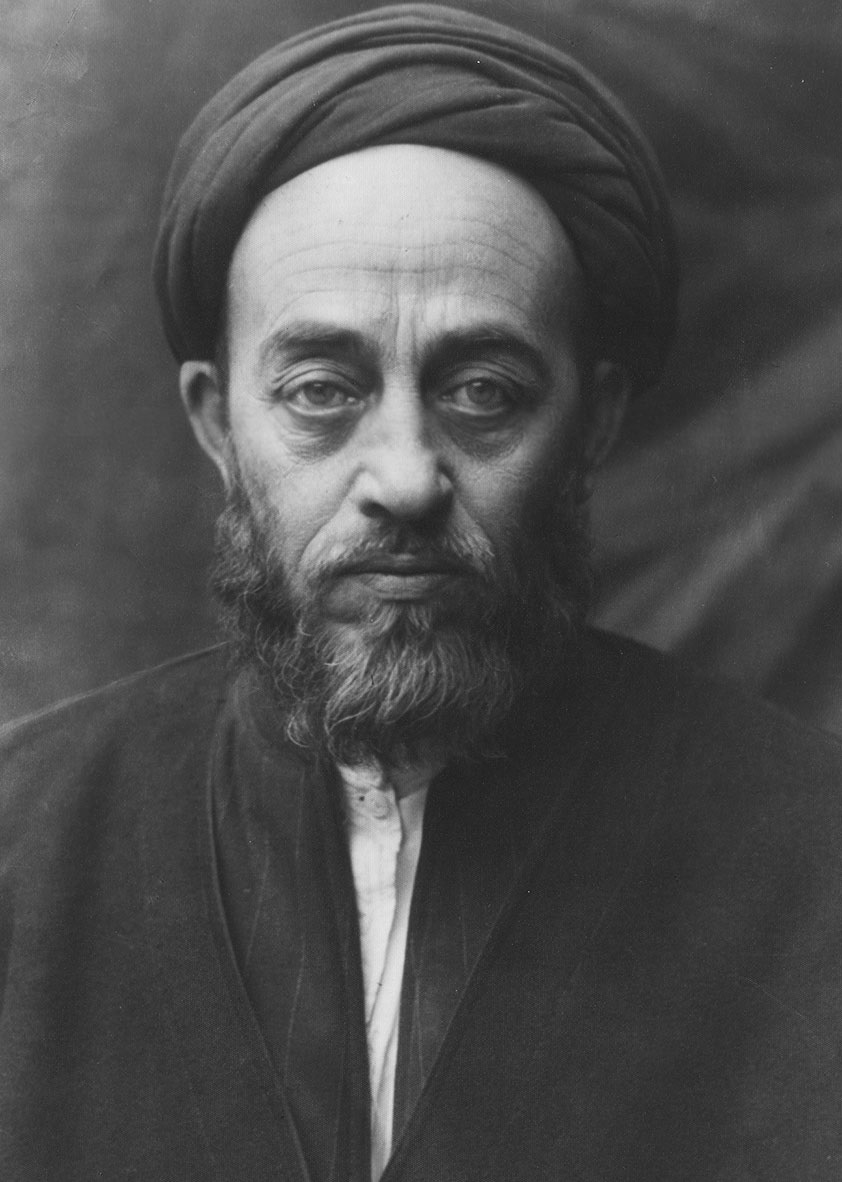
- Tabataba'i in 1946

Personal life
- Born: 16 March 1903 Shādābād, near Tabriz, Qajar Iran (present-day Iran)
- Died: 15 November 1981 (aged 78) Qom, Iran
- Resting place: Fatima Masumeh Shrine, Qom
- Flourished: 20th century
- Home town: Tabriz, Iran
- Spouse: Qamar al-Sādāt Mahdavī Tabataba'i (1923–1964), Mansoureh Ruzbeh (1966–1981)
- Children: Sayyid Abd al-Baqi Tabataba'i, Najmeh al-Sadat
- Parent(s): Sayyid Muhammad Tabataba'i, Rababeh Yahyavi
- Region: Iranian philosophy
- Main interest(s): Epistemology, Hadith studies, Islamic metaphysics, Islamic mysticism, Ontology, Quranic exegesis
- Education: Talibiyya School; Shiite seminary of Najaf
- Known for: Tafsir al-Mizan; interpreting the Qur'an through the Qur'an; contributions to Islamic philosophy

Religious life
- Religion: Islam
- Denomination: Shia Islam
- Institute: Qom Hawza
- Philosophy: Islamic philosophy, Islamic mysticism
- School: Usuli
- Lineage: Tabataba'i Sayyid family
- Sect: Twelver
- Jurisprudence: Ja'fari
- Profession: Islamic scholar, Islamic jurist, Qur'anic exegete, Philosopher, Theologian, mystic, Poet

Muslim leader
- Teacher: Sayyid Ali Qadi Tabataba'i, Sayyid Hasan Badkubai, Mirza Muhammad Husain Na'ini, Sheykh Muhammad Hossein Qaravi Esfahani, Sayyid Abu'l-Qasim Khwansari, Abu al-Hasan Isfahani
- Based in: Qom, Iran
- Post: Teacher of philosophy and Qur'anic exegesis at the Qom Hawza
- Influenced by: Avicenna, Mulla Sadra, Ibn Arabi, Mulla Hadi Sabzavari, Sayyid Ali Qadi Tabataba'i, Sayyid Hasan Badkubai
- Influenced: Morteza Motahhari, Hassan Hassanzadeh Amoli, Musa al-Sadr, Hussein-Ali Montazeri, Seyyed Hossein Nasr, Ja'far Sobhani, Mohammad Ezodin Hosseini Zanjani

Muhammad Husayn Tabataba'i (Persian: سید محمدحسین طباطبائی, romanized: Muḥammad Ḥusayn Ṭabāṭabāʾī; 16 March 1903 – 15 November 1981) was an Iranian scholar, theorist, philosopher and one of the most prominent thinkers of modern Shia Islam. He is perhaps best known for his Tafsir al-Mizan, a twenty-seven-volume work of tafsir (Quranic exegesis), which he produced between 1954 and 1972. He is commonly known as Allameh Tabataba'i, and the Allameh Tabataba'i University in Tehran is named after him.

== Biography ==
He received his earlier education in his native Tabriz, mastering the elements of Arabic and the religious sciences, and at about the age of twenty set out for the Shiite seminary of Najaf to continue more advanced studies. He studied under masters such as Ali Tabatabaei (in gnosis), Mirza Muhammad Husain Na'ini, Sheykh Muhammad Hossein Qaravi Esfahani (in Fiqh and Jurisprudence), Sayyid Abu'l-Qasim Khwansari (in Mathematics), as well as studying the standard texts of Avicenna's Shifa, the Asfar of Sadr al-Din Shirazi, and the Tamhid al-qawa'id of Ibn Turkah.

=== Childhood and Adolescence ===
Sayyid Muḥammad-Ḥusayn Qāḍī Tabataba'i Tabrīzī was born in 1902 (1281 AH) in the village of Shādābād Mashāyikh, near Tabriz. He lost his mother at the age of five and his father at the age of nine. Following the will of his father, the guardian sent him and his only brother, Muḥammad-Ḥasan Ilāhī Tabataba'i, to a traditional religious school. Between 1911 and 1917 (1290–1296 AH), he studied the Qur’an and classical Persian literature. Then, from 1918 to 1925 (1297–1304 AH), he pursued Islamic sciences, completing what he described as "...the core curriculum, except for philosophy and mysticism."

He wrote the following about his early studies:

“At the beginning of my studies, while engaged in ṣarf and naḥw [Arabic grammar], I had little interest in continuing my education. Consequently, I did not comprehend what I was reading, and this continued for four years. Then, all of a sudden, divine attention overtook me and changed me. I felt a kind of passion and restlessness for attaining perfection. From that day until the end of my studies, which lasted about seventeen years, I never once felt tired or discouraged from learning and contemplation. I forgot the ugliness and beauty of the world, and considered sweet and bitter events as equal. I completely cut off socializing with non-scholars. I sufficed with the bare minimum in food, sleep, and other necessities of life, devoting the rest of my time to study. Often, especially in spring and summer, I would study through the night until sunrise. I always prepared the next day’s lesson the night before, and if I encountered difficulties, I would resolve them no matter what. By the time I attended class, I already understood what the teacher was going to say. I never took a question or misunderstanding to my teacher.”

—

For six years (1911–1917), after learning the Qur’an—which was the primary focus of early education at the time—Tabataba'i studied texts such as Golestān and Būstān by Saadī Shirazi. Along with his literary studies, he studied calligraphy under the supervision of Mīrzā ʿAlī Naqī Khaṭṭāṭ. He later enrolled at the Ṭālibiyya School in Tabriz to pursue more advanced studies. There, he studied Arabic grammar, and transmitted sciences, jurisprudence, and legal theory from 1918 to 1925 (1297–1304 AH).

=== Studies in Najaf ===
After completing his studies at the Ṭālibiyya School, Tabataba'i went to Najaf with his brother and spent ten years studying Islamic sciences there. He studied mathematics under Sayyid Abū al-Qāsim Mūsavī Khwānsārī, the grandson of Sayyid Abū al-Qāsim Khwānsārī (Mīrkabīr). He also studied jurisprudence and legal theory under scholars such as Muḥammad-Ḥusayn Nāʾīnī and Muḥammad-Ḥusayn Gharawī Iṣfahānī, devoting ten years in total to these subjects.

His teacher in philosophy was the sage Sayyid Ḥusayn Bādkūbāʾī, with whom he and his brother Muḥammad-Ḥasan Ilāhī Tabataba'i studied extensively in Najaf. He also learned metaphysics, Qur’anic exegesis (interpreting the Qur’an through the Qur’an itself), philosophy, ethics, and *fiqh al-ḥadīth* under Sayyid ʿAlī Qāḍī Tabataba'i, under whose supervision he progressed in mystical knowledge. According to Maḥmūd Amjad, “ʿAllāma’s state would change upon hearing the name of Sayyid ʿAlī Qāḍī.”

=== Return to Tabriz ===
Due to financial hardship during his time in Najaf and the discontinuation of income from their agricultural land in Tabriz, Tabataba'i was forced to return to Iran. He spent ten years in the village of Shādābād near Tabriz engaged in farming and agriculture. His son, Sayyid ʿAbd al-Bāqī Tabataba'i, stated: “During the ten years after ʿAllāma’s return from Najaf to the village of Shādābād, due to his continuous efforts, the qanats were cleaned, the ruined orchards were revived and replanted, several new gardens were established, and even a summer house was built for the family’s seasonal residence.”

=== Life in Qom ===
After residing in Tabriz for some time, Tabataba'i decided to move to Qom, a decision he finalized in 1946 (1325 AH). According to his son, they initially stayed at a relative’s house, later renting a home with a small two-part room totaling about 20 square meters.

When he first arrived in Qom, he was known as “Qāḍī,” but due to his lineage from the Tabataba'i sayyids, he preferred to be called by that name. He wore simple clothes: a small turban, a cotton robe of blue fabric, his cloak unbuttoned, without socks, and overall with fewer garments than customary. He lived in modest housing and had few acquaintances in Qom, including Sayyid Muḥammad Ḥujjat Kuh-Kamari.

Among his achievements in Qom was his designing of the Ḥujjatiyya School. Initially, this school had limited capacity, so Sayyid Muḥammad Ḥujjat Kuh-Kamari purchased several thousand square meters of adjacent land. Architects and designers from cities such as Tehran submitted plans, but none was satisfactory. Eventually, Tabataba'i submitted his own design, which was approved, and the new building was constructed based on his plan.

== Works ==
In Najaf, Tabataba'i developed his major contributions in the fields of Tafsir (interpretation), philosophy, and history of the Shi'a faith. In philosophy the most important of his works is Usul-i falsafeh va ravesh-e-realism (The Principles of Philosophy and the Method of Realism), which has been published in five volumes with explanatory notes and the commentary of Morteza Motahhari. If Ayatollah Haeri is considered the reviver of Qom's hawza in an organizational sense, Tabataba'i's contributions to the field of tafsir, philosophy and mysticism represent the intellectual revitalization of the hawza with lasting implications for the curriculum.

=== List of publications ===
- A Shi'ite Anthology, translated into English by William Chittick
- Tafsir al-Mizan
- Shi'a Islam (Persian: Shi’ah dar Islam)
- The Principles of Philosophy and the Method of Realism (Persian: اصول فلسفه و روش رئالیسم Usul-i falsafeh va ravesh-i ri'alism) in five volumes, with the commentary of Murtada Mutahhari.
- Glosses al-kifayah (Persian: Hashiyahi kifayah). Glosses upon the new edition of the Asfar of Sadr al-Din Shirazi Mulla Sadra appearing under the direction of 'Allameh Tabataba'i of which seven volumes have appeared.
- Dialogues with Professor Corbin (Persian: Mushabat ba Ustad Kurban) Two volumes based on conversations carried out between 'Allameh Tabataba'i and Henry Corbin of which the first volume was printed as the yearbook of Maktab-i tashayyu’, 1339 (A.H. Solar)
- Risalah dar hukumat-i islami, (Treatise on Islamic Government).
- Hashiyah-i kifayah (Glosses upon al-Kifayah).
- Risalah dar quwwah wafi'(Treatise on Potentiality and Actuality).
- Risalah dar ithbat-i dha~t (Treatise on the Proof of the Divine Essence).
- Risalah dar sifat (Treatise on the Divine Attributes).
- Risalah dar ata (Treatise on the Divine Acts).
- Risalah dar wasa'il (Treatise on Means).
- Risalah dar insan qabl al-dunya (Treatise on Man before the World)
- Risalah dar insan fi al-dunya (Treatise on Man in the World).
- Risalah dar insan ba'd al-dunya (Treatise on Man after the World).
- Risalah dar nubuwwat (Treatise on Prophecy).
- Risalah dar wilayat (Treatise on Initiation).
- Risalah dar mushtaqqat (Treatise on Derivatives).
- Risalah dar burhan (Treatise on Demonstration).
- Risalah dar mughalatah (Treatise on Sophism).
- Risalah dar tahlil (Treatise on Analysis).
- Risalah dar tarkib (Treatise on Synthesis).
- Risalah dar i’tibarat (Treatise on Contingents).
- Risalah dar nubuwwat wa manamat (Treatise on Prophecy and Dreams)
- Manza’mah dar rasm-i- khatt-i-nasta’liq (Poem on the Method of Writing the Nasta’liq Style of Calligraphy).
- Ali wa al-falsafat al-ilahiya (Ali and Metaphysics)
- Qur'an dar Islam (The Qur'an in Islam).

Tabataba'i has two primary works that have received more attention than his other writings.

The first is Tafsir al-Mīzān, a 20-volume Quranic exegesis written in Arabic over the course of 20 years. This tafsir uses the method of “interpreting the Qur’an through the Qur’an,” and in addition to interpretation and linguistic analysis, it contains separate discussions—depending on the topic of the verses—on narrative, historical, theological, philosophical, and social matters. The work has been published in two formats: initially in 40 volumes, and later condensed into 20 volumes. It was translated into Persian by Sayyid Muhammad Bāqir Musavī Hamadānī.

His other major work is *The Principles of Philosophy and the Method of Realism*. This book consists of 14 philosophical essays, written during the 1940s and 1950s, and explained by Murtazā Mutahharī with a focus on comparative philosophy. It is one of the first and most important books that examined philosophical topics in light of both Islamic philosophical wisdom and modern Western philosophy.

Mehdi Khalaji writes:

“The most prominent representative of Islamic philosophy at the time, Muhammad Husayn Tabataba’i, held study sessions in his home in Qom that critiqued the philosophical foundations of communism. However, his and his students’ understanding of communism was limited to pamphlets and Persian magazines of the Tudeh Party. The result of these sessions was a book titled *The Principles of Philosophy and the Method of Realism*, which was published in 1953 (1332 AH) with footnotes by Murtazā Mutahharī. This book critiqued the philosophical ideas of communism based on the writings of Taqī Arānī, the ideological founder of the Tudeh Party.”

Among his important intellectual gatherings were his discussions with Henry Corbin, attended by Hossein Nasr and many others, as well as sessions held in Tehran with figures such as Dariush Shayegan.

Tabataba’i himself said the following about these dialogues:

According to Corbin, Orientalists have until now derived their understanding of Islam from Sunni sources, and as a result, the true nature of Shi‘i Islam has not been properly introduced to the Western world. Contrary to past Orientalist beliefs, I maintain that Shi‘ism is an authentic and enduring religion, with the characteristics of a true faith, and it is different from what has been presented to the West. Through scholarly research, I have come to believe that the true spiritual essence of Islam must be understood through the lens of Shi‘ism—which takes a realistic approach to this religion. That is why I have made efforts to introduce Shi‘ism to the Western world in the manner it truly deserves. I am deeply interested in establishing direct contact with the scholars and leading figures of this tradition, to become familiar with their ways of thinking, and to seek their help in examining the foundations of Shi‘ism so that I may gain a clearer understanding of my goal.

== Poetry ==
Although primarily recognized for his philosophical and exegetical contributions, Tabataba'i also composed poetry in both Persian and Arabic. His poetry addresses themes such as divine love, metaphysical reflection, and spiritual inquiry.

One collection of his Persian poetry is titled Kish-e Mehr (The Creed of Love), which includes over 200 ghazals composed in a style that combines classical Persian lyric forms with themes drawn from Islamic spirituality and Shiʿi metaphysics. The poems reference concepts commonly found in Islamic mysticism (ʿirfān).

In fear that they might be exploited and "...misused by the wicked offsprings of worldliness, unjust rulers, and irreligious governments," otherwise fearing his religious works would be dismissed by the Iranian clergy due to his status as a poet, Tabataba'i burned and destroyed many of his poems.

== Family ==
Tabataba'i was of the lineage of the Tabataba'i Sayyids of Azerbaijan, and he was related to Sayyid ‘Ali Qāḍī and Sayyid Muhammad ‘Ali Qāḍī Tabataba’i. Tabataba’i’s first wife, Qamar al-Sādāt Mahdavī Tabataba’i, was a relative of his who died in 1964 (1343 AH), and two years later he married his second wife, Mansoureh Ruzbeh, the sister of Reza Ruzbeh. She was a descendant of Abd al-Wahhab Tabrizi, whose lineage is said to trace back to Hasan al-Muthanna, the son of the second Shi‘i Imam, Hasan ibn Ali.

== Henry Corbin ==
An event pertinent to the intellectual life of Tabataba'i during his time in Qom was the arrival of Henry Corbin from France to Iran and his meetings with Tabataba'i in Qom and Tehran. These meetings, which led to the formation of a significant philosophical circle of that era, were initiated by Henry Corbin. Many later contemporary Iranian philosophers, alongside Corbin, studied philosophy and engaged in extensive philosophical discussions with Tabataba'i. Corbin, a Heideggerian philosopher, had come to Iran in search of answers to his unanswered questions, hoping to find them in the presence of Tabataba'i, who was seen as an interpreter of Shia philosophy. Corbin himself acknowledged that Tabataba'i provided him with precise and convincing answers.

When Corbin came to Iran, he established relationships with many Iranian scholars. However, Corbin was especially interested in connecting with scholars who were engaged with literature, art, and philosophy of Iran, rather than those considered “intellectuals,” who were often individuals that had studied in the West. During this same period, Corbin, along with Tabataba'i, formed a philosophical circle in Tehran. The meetings were held at the home of Ahmad Dhū al-Majd Tabataba'i, a lawyer with specific interest in divine philosophy.

Both Corbin and Tabataba'i emphasized the role of taʾwīl (esoteric interpretation) in gaining knowledge. Tabataba'i believed that true spirituality was impossible without taʾwīl; this shared perspective created a common horizon between the two philosophers, allowing for meaningful dialogue. The sessions, attended by various recognized Iranian professors of philosophy and theology, continued for years in northern Tehran, involving extensive discussions on Shia philosophy.

Corbin's connection with scholars like Tabataba'i and Sayyid Jalāl al-Dīn Āshtiyānī was one of the most significant events in his life, as he believed they were the continuers of the same divine wisdom whose 'light' had never gone out in Iran since ancient times. According to Corbin, Iranian thought serves as the guardian and preserver of a heritage that transcends a limited national outlook, resembling a spiritual world in which guests and pilgrims from other places are welcomed and hosted. Corbin deeply believed that Iranian-Islamic philosophy was an indestructible wisdom, and he often spoke of the “indestructible potential of the Iranian spirit.”

== Views ==
=== Position on the 1979 Iranian Revolution ===
Tabataba'i did not participate in the Iranian revolution. He and Ruhollah Khomeini were among the clerics who, alongside teaching jurisprudence, were also committed to philosophy, unlike the common approach in the seminary. However, it is said that Tabataba'i’s classes were more vibrant than Khomeini’s. Even before the revolution, Tabataba'i and Khomeini did not have a warm relationship. Tabataba'i was Khomeini’s tenant, and his rent had been delayed for several months. But Mortazā Pasandideh, Khomeini’s brother, refused to grant an extension, and Tabataba'i was forced to vacate the house.

Najmeh Sādāt Tabataba'i, Tabataba'i’s daughter and the wife of Ali Qodusi, confirmed the essence of this incident but provided a different version. She stated: “They spread a lot of misinformation about the relationship between the Imam and ‘Allāma Tabataba'i…” and said: “The Imam Khomeini sent a message saying that if you want to stay, I will pay the rent from the Imam’s share (khums), but my father, since he didn’t use the Imam’s share, said: ‘We will not live in a house paid for by the Imam’s share,’ and therefore they left.”

Mohsen Kadivar, a religious scholar, stated that after Qodusi's assassination, some went to express condolences to Tabataba'i, and he said: “This revolution had one true martyr who was martyred in utter injustice—and that was Islam.” Or, in another version: “The first martyr of the revolution was Islam.” According to Kadivar, this sentence by Tabataba'i was a concise and precise statement.

Mohammad-Hossein Qodusi, Tabataba'i’s grandson, denied this narrative, writing that his grandfather “had a clear and distinct political stance” in opposition to Khomeini. In Khomeini’s view, the transformation and reform of society was based on political and governmental change, though Tabataba'i viewed social reform as being centered on cultural, social, and human transformation.

Najmeh Sādāt Tabataba'i, the wife of Ali Qodusi, stated that during the two months that Tabataba'i lived after her husband’s death, he was hospitalized for a heart problem, and due to his poor condition, they could not inform him of his son-in-law’s passing.

=== Views on Western Societies ===
Tabataba'i did not hold an optimistic view of the West. He repeatedly portrayed Western civilization as a symbol of corruption and moral decay in his opinions. In Tafsīr al-Mīzān, when discussing law, he criticizes Western legal systems by saying, “Modern civilization enacts and implements its laws based on the whims of the majority.” Tabataba'i asserted that the laws of Western nations are not based on moral principles, and thus lead to societal corruption and the breakdown of law and order (ibid., p. 173).

Ahmad Ahmadi stated that Tabataba'i’s view of the West changed after his medical trip to London. Ahmadi says:

“… Upon arrival, the police treated Mr. Ṭabāṭabā’ī with great respect. Right there, I told him: Ḥajji Āghā, you’ve been very critical of Europe in your writings. If you had visited earlier and seen the order and discipline here, would you have criticized it so harshly? He replied: No. Do you understand? He said: No; meaning there was a sense of fairness in this noble man, and whatever he found to be right, he accepted, and whatever he found to be wrong, he rejected.”

Tabataba'i was not fond of the customs and ethics of European nations. However, his medical trip altered his opinions.

== Pupils ==
Some of his pupils include:

- Morteza Motahhari
- Hassan Hassanzadeh Amoli
- Musa al-Sadr
- Hussein-Ali Montazeri
- Seyyed Hossein Nasr
- Ja'far Sobhani
- Sayyid Muhammad Muhsin Husayni Tihrani
- Mohammad Ezodin Hosseini Zanjani

== See also ==
- Islamic scholars
- Islamization of knowledge
- Islamic philosophy
- Ayatollah al-Shirazi
- List of maraji
- Allameh Majlesi
- Hossein Nasr
- Tafsir al-Mizan
- Mohammad Ali Naseri
- Abbas Quchani
- Mohammad Javad Ansari Hamedani
- Mohammad Ali Shah Abadi
- Mirza Javad Agha Tehrani
