= Abdol Hossein Dastgheib =

Iranian Twelver Shia Ayatollah (1913–1981)

Grand Ayatollah Abdol Hossein Dastgheib
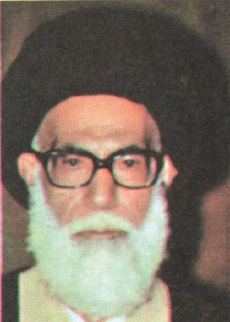
- Title: Grand Ayatollah

Personal life
- Born: December 8, 1913 Shiraz, Iran
- Died: December 11, 1981 (aged 68) Shiraz, Iran
- Cause of death: Bombing
- Resting place: Imam Ali Mosque
- Parent: Seyed Mohammad Taqi (father)

Religious life
- Religion: Usuli Twelver Shia Islam

Senior posting
- Based in: Shiraz, Iran
- Post: Grand Ayatollah

Abdol Hossein Dastgheib (Persian: سید عبدالحسین دستغیب) (8 December 1913 – 11 December 1981). He was appointed Imam of Friday Prayer and one of the representatives of the Supreme Leader in Shiraz. He was a Mujtahid, expert in Arabic language, theology, revealed texts, and the principles of jurisprudence (Usul al-fiqh).

== Biography ==
Dastgheib's father Seyed Mohammad Taqi, who taught elementary education, died when he was 11 or 12 years old. He continued his education after the death his father in Shiraz, then continued his education in Najaf. After returning to Iran, he commenced serious political activities.

== Political activities ==
=== Before Iranian Revolution ===
He participated in a political struggle during Pahlavi dynasty. He was imprisoned for criticizing government policies and forced by the regime to leave Iran, returning in 1962. He supported Ruhollah Khomeini and continued to perform political activities against the regime. On June 5, 1963, he was arrested and exiled to Tehran, and in 1964, he was again arrested and sent into exile. He was the leader of people of Shiraz in the struggle against the Pahlavi. In 1977, the regime placed him under house arrest but had to retreat for people's reaction. After people were massacred during public demonstrations in Shiraz against shah's regime, he was arrested.

=== After Iranian Revolution ===
He was appointed Imam of Friday Prayer and representative of the Supreme Leader in Shiraz, and was a Mujtahidd who was expert in the Arabic language, theology, revealed texts, and the principles of jurisprudence (Usul al-fiqh). He was a representative of the people of Fars in the Assembly of Experts.

== Mentors ==
- Abu l-Hasan al-Isfahani
- Agha Zia Addin Araghi
- Ali Tabatabaei
- Mohammad Kazem Shirazi (from a mentor of ethics and mysticism)
- Mohammad Jawad Ansari Hamedani
- Seyed Mirza Estahbahanati

== Books ==
He authored the following books.

1. Everlasting heaven
2. Certain role
3. Faith
4. Resurrection
5. Sermon of shabarieh
6. Hosseini uprising
7. Great sins
8. Humble prayers
9. Great Fatemeh Zahra and Zeinab
10. Ascension to heaven
11. Prophecy
12. Heart of Quran
13. Introduction from the Quran
14. Another world
15. Islamic behavior
16. questions
17. Secrecy of the Quran
18. Office of Imam (Imamate)
19. Truth from Quran
20. Eternity
21. Friday sermons
22. Pure heart
23. Manners from the Quran
24. Unitarianism
25. Fantastic stories
26. Sayed-Ol-Shohada

== Death ==
On 11 December 1981, Dastgheib and seven companions were killed in a bomb explosion as they were travelling to the mosque to lead Friday prayer.

== Gallery ==
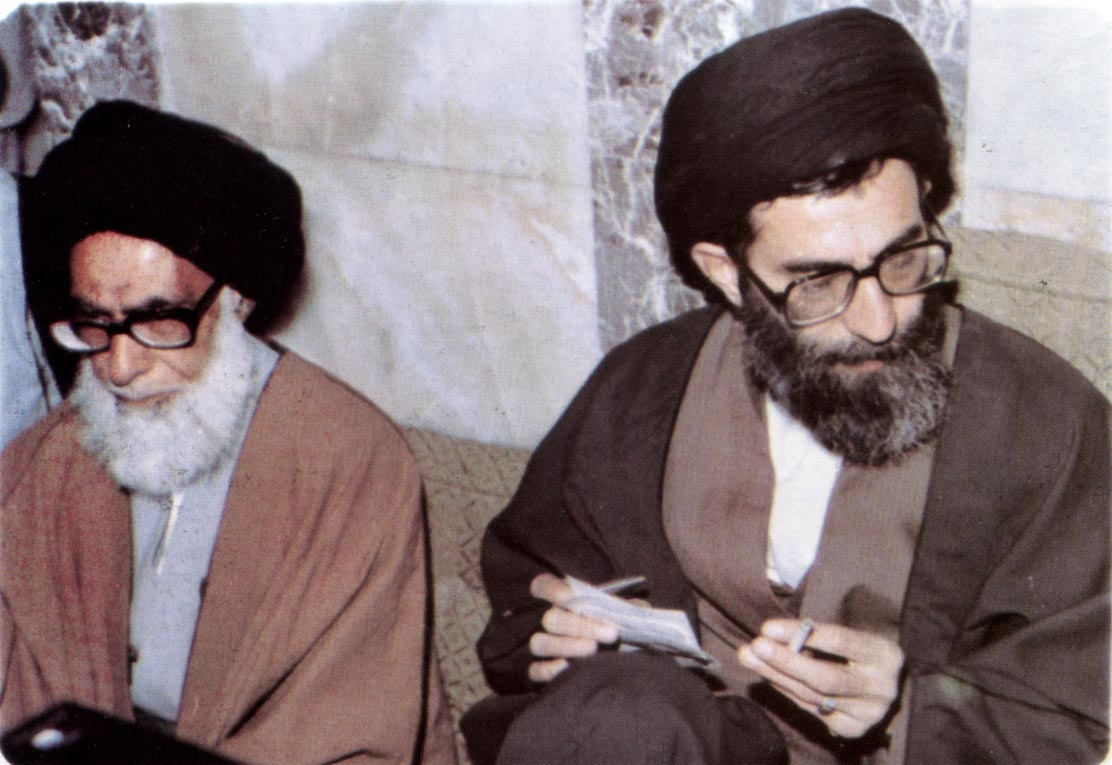
Abdol Hossein Dastgheib (left) and President Ali Khamenei (right)

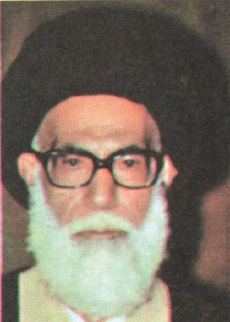
Member of Assembly of Experts for Constitution 1979

== See also ==
- The Five Martyrs
- Shahid Awwal
- Shahid Thani
- Shahid Salis
- Shahid Rabay
- Shahid Khamis
- Muhammad al-Tijani
