= Mohammad Behbahani =

Iranian Shia cleric and politician (1874–1963)

Mir Seyyed Mohammad Behbahani
- میر سید محمد بهبهانی
- Born: 1874; Tehran, Qajar Iran
- Died: 11 November 1963 (aged 89); Tehran, Pahlavi Iran
- Resting place: Najaf
- Other name: Ayatollah Mir Seyyed Mohammad Behbahani
- Occupations: cleric and mujtahid
- Notable work: playing roles in the Constitutional Revolution and later in the overthrow of Mohammad Mosaddegh's government.
- Father: Seyyed Abdollah Behbahani

Mohammad Behbahani (Persian: محمد بهبهانی; 1874 — 11 November 1963) was a prominent religious authority in Tehran during the contemporary era, playing roles in the Constitutional Revolution and later in the overthrow of Mohammad Mosaddegh's government.

== Family and education ==
Seyyed Mohammad was the son of Seyyed Abdollah Behbahani, who was counted among the Shia scholars of Tehran and leaders of the constitutional movement. His grandfather, Seyyed Ismail Behbahani, was also a scholar comparable to Mulla Ali Kani and Seyyed Sadegh Sangalaji. Seyyed Abdullah Baladi Busheri, from the close relatives of Mir Seyyed Mohammad Behbahani, was also renowned. He pursued his religious education in Tehran and Najaf under the tutelage of Akhund Khorasani and Seyyed Mohammad Kazem Tabatabai Yazdi, reaching the rank of Ijtihad. During the Constitutional era, he was introduced to the parliament by Akhund Khorasani as the top scholar.

== During the Qajar Era ==
He was elected as a representative in the second term of the National Consultative Assembly but did not attend the sessions, and eventually, his resignation was read in the parliament on 19 September 1910.

== During the Pahlavi Era ==
Mir Seyyed Mohammad Behbahani was associated with the Pahlavi court and opposed Mohammad Mossadegh during the nationalization of Iran's oil. He played a significant role in gathering supporters of the Shah during the coup on 19 August 1953. Dr. Mossadegh referred to him and others as the "scholars of coup." Behbahani, upon understanding the rise of Ayatollah Khomeini in the 63 Movement, became a supporter of this movement in a short period. The Shah vehemently warned him that if he supported the Khomeini movement, he (Shah) would make him (Behbahani) shave his beard dry and without soap. Behbahani replied to the Shah, saying: "Since 19 August (due to efforts to return you and people's welcoming you), so many people have spat on my face that it is impossible to shave my beard dry!"

Mir Seyyed Mohammad Behbahani's life and actions reflect the complex political landscape of Iran during his time, where religious figures often played significant roles in both supporting and opposing various regimes and movements.

== Dollar-e Behbahani ==
The term "Dollar-e Behbahani" (Behbahani Dollars) was first mentioned by a former CIA officer named Richard Cottam in his book. Cottam, a professor of international relations at the University of Pittsburgh and author of "Nationalism in Iran," became a liaison between the United States and associates of Ayatollah Khomeini during the 1979 Revolution and even visited Khomeini in Neauphle-le-Château. Several years after leaving the CIA and starting his academic career, he briefly noted in his book that during the coup, "Behbahani Dollars" were distributed among clerics and southern Tehran factions.

According to declassified U.S. government documents that were released from the National Archives in 2017 under the title "Review of Recent Crisis," the U.S. Embassy in Tehran was a source of at least some of the "Behbahani Dollars." The document stated: "Based on credible reports, the U.S. Embassy secretly paid substantial sums of money to certain influential individuals, including Ayatollah Behbahani, a prominent cleric."

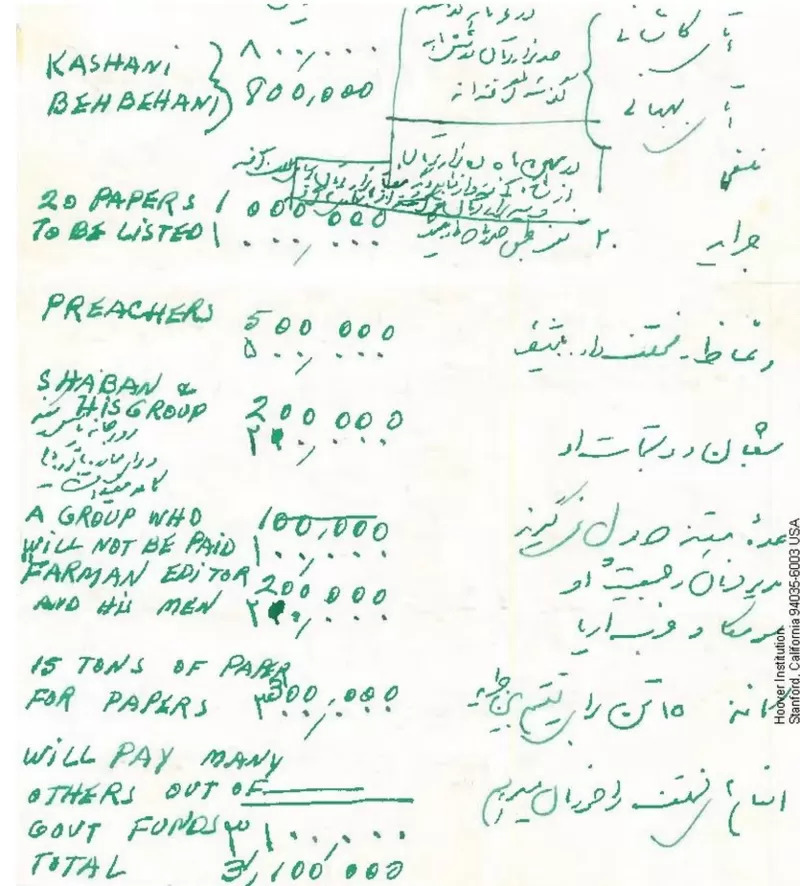
A bilingual note by Ardeshir Zahedi, apparently detailing the financial rights and wages of the 1953 Iranian coup d'état, mentions that payments to Mohammad Behbahani continued after the overthrow of Mossadegh. A CIA report, citing sources close to General Fazlollah Zahedi, the new Prime Minister, stated that Zahedi gave Behbahani ten thousand tomans (about a thousand dollars) on the 26th of September and five thousand tomans (about five hundred dollars) a week later "to maintain Behbahani's goodwill and support him."

According to the document "Review of Recent Crisis," dated September 2, 1953, Mohammad Behbahani was also one of the key figures in the final stages of the overthrow of Mossadegh on the morning of 19 August (1953). This document appears to be a British government report on some events of the coup, which they sent to their American counterparts. The U.S. State Department published a censored and incomplete version of the document in 1989. The censored sections, first reported by BBC Persian, are highly significant as they relate to the role of the U.S. ambassador in the coup and the controversial issue of "Behbahani Dollars."

The document also states that Behbahani was one of the few people aware of the coup plan on the morning of 19 August, demonstrating the complete trust of U.S. and British intelligence agencies in Mohammad Behbahani. Such trust was unlikely to have existed regarding Abolqasem Kashani, who was strongly opposed to Britain. This is perhaps why some experts believe that the United States adopted a policy of engaging with Kashani to weaken Mohammad Mossadegh, but did not involve him in the details of the coup.

These documents also indicate that only a few individuals were aware of the coup plan: some military unit commanders, the head of the police force, and "Behbahani, who was responsible for organizing the demonstrations." The documents also narrate that after Mossadegh's overthrow, payments to Mohammad Behbahani continued. A CIA report, citing sources close to General Fazlollah Zahedi, the new Prime Minister, stated that Zahedi gave Behbahani ten thousand tomans (about a thousand dollars) on the 26th of September and five thousand tomans (about five hundred dollars) a week later "to maintain Behbahani's goodwill and support him."

== Death ==
Mir Seyyed Mohammad died on 11 November 1963 at the age of eighty-nine and was buried in Najaf.

== See also ==
- Mohammad Ali Shah Abadi
- Mirza Javad Agha Tehrani
