= Hussein al-Shirazi =

Iraqi-Iranian Ayatollah

Ayatollah Sayyid Hussein al-Shirazi
- سید حسین الحسیني الشیرازي

Personal life
- Born: 1970 (age 55–56) Karbala, Iraq
- Parent: Sadiq al-Shirazi (father)
- Education: Qom Hawza
- Relatives: Mirza Shirazi (great-great grandfather); Mirza Mahdi al-Shirazi (grandfather); Mohammad al-Shirazi (uncle); Hassan al-Shirazi (uncle); Mujtaba al-Shirazi (uncle); Mohammed Ridha al-Shirazi (cousin); Murtadha al-Shirazi (cousin)

Religious life
- Religion: Islam
- Denomination: Twelver Shia

Ayatollah Sayyid Hussein al-Husayni al-Shirazi (Arabic: حسين الحسيني الشيرازي; Persian: حسين حسينى شيرازى; ) is an Iraqi Twelver Shia cleric. He is a son of Grand Ayatollah Sadiq al-Shirazi. He is currently the head of his father's office and is residing in Qom, Iran.

== Early life and education ==
Hussein al-Shirazi was born in Karbala, to Sadiq al-Shirazi, a Shia marja', and Siddiqa Thabit, the daughter of Muhammad Thabit, a cleric and orator. A year after his birth, his family were exiled from Iraq, and settled in Kuwait. Ten years later, they migrated to Iran, and settled in Qom.

Al-Shirazi began his religious education at an early stage, and studied under his uncle, Grand Ayatollah Sayyid Muhammad al-Shirazi, and his father. He also studied under Grand Ayatollah Sayyid Muhammad-Sadiq al-Rohani.

== Clashes with Iran ==
=== Arrest and subsequent protests ===
Hussein al-Shirazi was forcefully arrested by police in Qom on 6 March 2018. The reasons for his arrest was because he was critical of Velayat Faqih and Iranian Supreme Leader, Ali Khamenei in a lecture he gave in Qom. In his lecture, he compared Khamenei to the Pharaoh of Egypt.

His arrest sparked outrage from the followers of his father, and as a result of this it led to protests in London, Kuwait and Iraq. In London, protestors–linked to the controversial cleric, Yasser al-Habib–managed to climb onto the balcony of the Iranian Embassy, waving their flags and chanting anti-Khamenei and Islamic Republic slogans. The protestors who climbed the balcony and replaced the flag of Iran with the blue flag of al-Habib's organisation (Servants of Imam Mahdi), were arrested. Nobody was hurt during the protests in the embassy.

=== Protests aftermath ===
Iranian Ambassador to United Kingdom, Hamid Baeidinejad tweeted that the assailants belonged to the "Shirazi Cult", and that the staff in the embassy were well and not harmed.

The current Prosecutor-General of Iran, Mohammad Jafar Montazeri warned that the country's Judicial system will take "any legal action against the supports of al-Shirazi's father, and during an Iranian State TV (IRIB) interview claimed that the Shirazi sect is causing fitna amongst Muslim Sects."

=== Release ===
After 13 days of being arrested, Hussein al-Shirazi was released from prison, on bail.
