= Muhammad Taqi Amoli =

Shiite jurist, philosopher and mystic (1887–1971)

Ayatollah Sheikh Muhammad Taqi Amoli
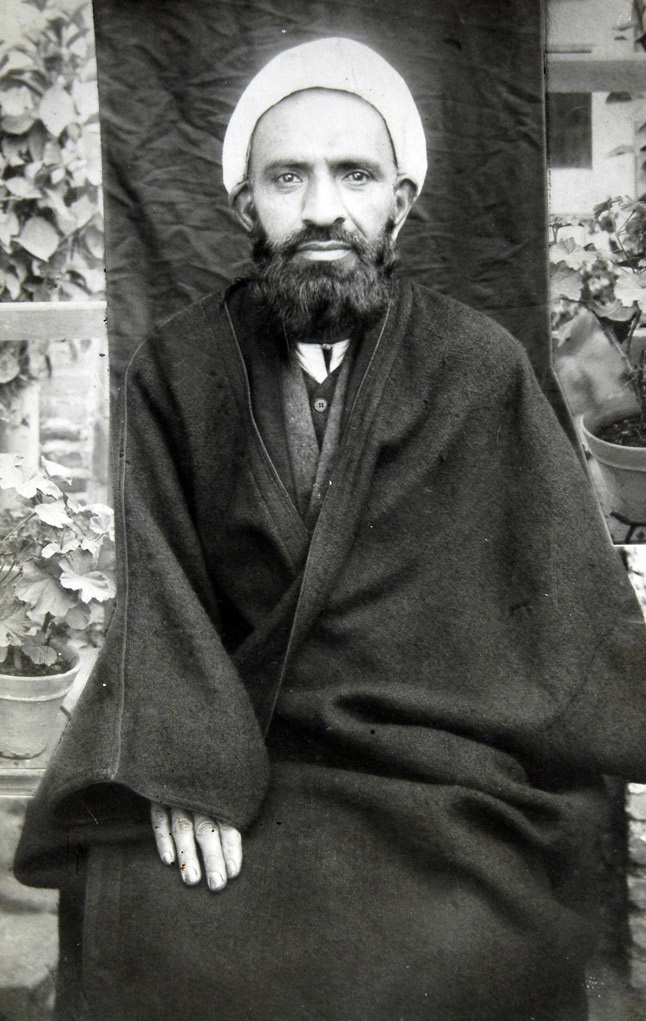
- Muhammad Taqi Amoli, late 1920s

Personal life
- Born: 1887 Tehran, Sublime State of Iran
- Died: 1971 (aged 83–84) Tehran, Imperial State of Iran
- Resting place: Imam Reza Shrine
- Region: Tehran, Majd al-Dowleh mosque
- Main interest(s): Islamic philosophy, jurisprudence
- Notable work: Commentary on Poems of Hikmat part of Manẓuma of Hadi Sabzavari

Religious life
- Religion: Islam

Muslim leader
- Disciple of: Mulla Muhammad Amoli, Sheikh Abdu Nabi Nouri, Mirza Hassan kermanshahi, Mirza Naini, Agha Zia ol Din Araghi, Abu l-Hasan al-Isfahani and Grand Ayatollah Aqa Sayyed Ali Qazi Tabatabei
- Influenced: Mahmoud Taleghani, Mohammad Sadeqi Tehrani, Hassan Hassanzadeh Amoli, Razi Shirazi, Abdollah Javadi-Amoli, Mehdi Mohaghegh, Reza Esfahani, Abdoldjavad Falaturi, Mohammed Emami-Kashani

Mohammad Taqi Amoli (Persian: محمدتقی آملی; 1887–1971) was an Iranian Shia jurist, philosopher and mystic.

== Early life ==
Ayatollah Sheikh Mohammad Taqi Amoli was born in 1887 in Tehran. His father was Mulla Muhammad Amoli. They were the relatives of Hakim Mirza Abul-Hasan Jelveh. Muhammad Taqi Amoli was really one of the contemporary great scholars. He also has been a prominent student of Allameh Ali Tabatabaei who was known as Qazi. He taught and led the mosque of Majd ed-Dowleh.

== Teachers ==
- Ali Tabatabaei
- Agha Zia ol Din Araghi
- Muhammad Hussain Naini
- Abu l-Hasan al-Isfahani
- Abdolhosein Hezarjaribi
- Reza Nouri Mazandarani
- Ali Nouri
- Mirza Hassan kermanshahi
- Abdul Nabi Nouri
- Mohammad Hadi Taleghani

=== Students ===
- Abdollah Javadi Amoli
- Mahmoud Taleghani
- Hassan Hassanzadeh Amoli
- Razi Shirazi
- Mehdi Mohaghegh
- Mohammad Sadeqi Tehrani
- Mohammed Emami-Kashani
- Abdoldjavad Falaturi
- Sayyed Hassan Saadat Mostafavi
- Yahya Abedi
- Mustafa Masjed Jameie
- Mohammad Taqi Shariatmadari
- Reza Isfahani

== Works ==
Many books in different subjects such as philosophy, jurisprudence and theology were written by Ayatollah Sheikh Muhammad Taqi. Some of them are as below:

- Notes on Faraed of Sheikh Ansary, explaining the poems of Hikmate Sabzevari, explaining the phrase of "there is no God but Allah"
- Notes on Sharhe Matale in Logic
- Notes On Sharhe Shamsiah, A Treaty on Praying and Islamic Judgments
- Notes On Asfar (Al-Hikma al-muta‘aliya fi-l-asfar al-‘aqliyya al-arba‘a by Mulla Sadra)
- Notes On Admonitions and The valuable collection of Mesbah Al Hedayah in 12 vol as a commentary on Orvatol Vosqa.

== Death ==
He died in 1971 in Tehran and was buried at Imam Reza Shrine in the garden of Ridvan Sabzevar (son of Mirza Musa Mirza Hossein Sabzevari).

== bibliography ==
- Islamic Great encyclopedia, vol.2.pub:the center of Islamic great Encyclopedia, 1367 solar.
