= Bagher Shirazi =

Iranian professor and architect

Sayyid Bagher Shirazi
- سيد باقر آیت‌الله‌زاده شيرازي
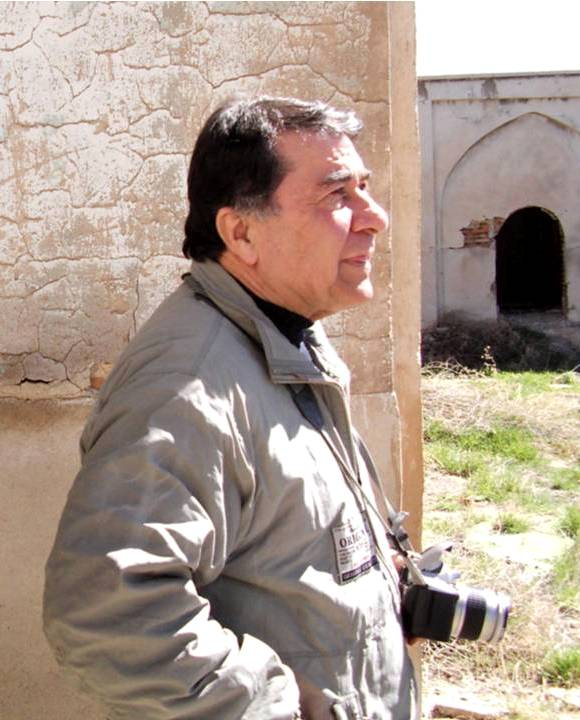
- Born: 23 August 1936; Najaf, Iraq
- Died: 19 August 2007 (aged 70); Tehran, Iran
- Citizenship: Iranian
- Education: University of Rome (PhD); University of Tehran (BA, MA, PhD)
- Father: Muhammad-Husayn al-Shirazi
- Relatives: Razi Shirazi (brother); Mirza Shirazi (great grandfather); Mirza Mahdi al-Shirazi (second cousin, once removed); Mohammad al-Shirazi (second cousin)
- Website: Official website

Bagher Ayatollahzadeh Shirazi (Persian: باقر آیت‌الله‌زاده شيرازى; born Baqir al-Husayni al-Shirazi (Arabic: باقر الحسيني الشيرازي); 23 August 1936 – 19 August 2007), was an Iranian professor and architect.

Shirazi was the deputy coordinator at the Iranian Cultural Heritage Organization (ICHO), coordinating and supervising all ICHO activities at a national and international level, establishing executive centers of the organization across all provinces of Iran. He then became the head of the organization, and remained until 2000.

== Early life and education ==
Shirazi was born in Najaf, Iraq. He hailed from the prominent religious al-Shirazi family. His father was Sayyid Muhammad-Husayn al-Shirazi (d. 1955), the son of grand Ayatollah Mirza Ali Agha al-Shirazi (d. 1936). His mother was the daughter of Sheikh Muhammad-Kadhim al-Shirazi (d. 1948). His eldest brother Razi is a religious jurist. One of his brothers, Mostafa is a doctor in agricultural studies and resides in Oregon.

=== Education ===
Shirazi travelled to Iran often at a young age until he settled in 1955, after his father died. He studied at the University of Tehran, earning a bachelor's degree and masters in Architecture. He then went to the University of Rome, and completed his PhD in the Study and Restoration of Historic Monuments.

== Works ==
=== Books ===
- Isfahan in the history.
- Islamic Architecture.
- Iranian Architecture and Urbanism. 5 volumes.

=== Papers ===
Shirazi has produced more than 65 scientific and research papers on architecture, conservation and related topics that have been published in journals and proceedings.

== Awards ==
- Agha Khan Foundation Award for Architecture for the restoration of the historic monuments in Isfahan, 1980.
- Honored as a Selected Feature of Iranian Architecture and Culture by the Iran Academy of Art, 2001.
- Honored as a Devoted Feature of cultural heritage by Iranian Cultural Heritage Organization, 2003.

== See also ==
- Iranian architecture
- History of Isfahan
- Mirza Shirazi
