= Murtadha al-Shirazi =

Author (born 1964)

Ayatollah Sayyid Murtadha al-Shirazi
- مرتضى الحسيني الشيرازي

Personal life
- Born: 1964 (age 61–62) Karbala, Iraq
- Children: Mustafa; Muhammad-Jawad (deceased); Mehdi
- Parent: Muhammad al-Shirazi (father)
- Relatives: Mirza Shirazi (great-great grandfather); Mirza Mahdi al-Shirazi (grandfather); Sadiq al-Shirazi (uncle); Mohammad Taqi al-Modarresi (cousin)

Religious life
- Religion: Islam
- Denomination: Twelver Shīʿā

Muslim leader
- Based in: Najaf, Iraq

Ayatollah Sayyid Murtadha al-Hussaini al-Shirazi (Note: Arabic: مرتضى الحسيني الشيرازي, romanized: Murtaḍā al-Ḥusaynī ash-Shīrāzī; Persian: مرتضی حسینی شیرازی) (born 1964) is a Shia mujtahid and author. He is the second son of late Grand Ayatollah Sayyid Mohammad al-Shirazi. He teaches a number of higher level classes in Islamic law, legal theory and Quranic exegesis at the religious seminary of Najaf, Iraq.

== Biography ==
Al-Shirazi was born in Karbala, Iraq in 1964. His family had produced scholars and marjas, including Mirza Hassan Shirazi, leader of the constitutional, also known as the Tobacco Movement in Iran, Grand Ayatollah Muhammad Taqi Shirazi, leader of the 1920 revolution in Iraq, which liberated Iraq from colonial powers, and his father Grand Ayatollah Mohammad al-Shirazi.

In 1995, Shirazi was imprisoned for 18 months after which he "reportedly escaped to Syria and has requested political asylum."

He has written a number of books in Arabic with some of his works translated into English.

== List of his books ==
1. Economic Success: Practical Strategies for Producing Wealth and Combating Poverty in the System of Imam Ali
2. A Commentary of the Quranic Verse of the Divine Authority of Imam Ali: and his infallible progeny

== See also ==
- Sadiq Hussaini Shirazi
