= Mujtaba al-Shirazi =

Iraqi-Iranian Ayatollah

Ayatollah; Seyyed; Mujtaba al-Shirazi
- السيد مجتبى الحسيني الشيرازي

Personal life
- Born: 6 August 1943 (age 83) Karbala, Kingdom of Iraq
- Children: Mustafa
- Parent: Mirza Mahdi al-Shirazi (father)
- Relatives: Mirza Shirazi (great-great grandfather); Muhammad al-Shirazi (brother); Sadiq al-Shirazi (brother); Hassan al-Shirazi (brother); Mohammed Kadhim al-Modarresi (brother-in-law); Mohammed Kadhim al-Qazwini (brother-in-law)

Religious life
- Religion: Islam
- Denomination: Shi'a
- Sect: Twelver
- Jurisprudence: Ja'fari (Usuli)
- Movement: Shirazi

Muslim leader
- Based in: London, UK

Sayyid Mujtaba al-Husayni al-Shirazi. (Arabic: مجتبى الحسيني الشيرازي; Persian: مجتبى حسينى شيرازى; b. ِ6 August 1943) is an Iraqi Shia jurist.

== Early life and education ==
Al-Shirazi was born to Mirza Mahdi al-Shirazi and Halima al-Shirazi. Both of his parents are from the distinguished clerical al-Shirazi family that emigrated from Shiraz to Karbala in the 19th century. He is the tenth of ten children. All of his brothers are clerics, and his brothers Muhammad al-Shirazis and Sadiq al-Shirazi are marja's. His mother is the great-granddaughter of Mirza Shirazi, the pioneer of the Tobacco Movement. His nephew, Mohammad Taqi al-Modarresi is also a marja'.

=== Education ===
He grew up in Karbala, and studied in its seminary under his father, his older brother, Muhammad al-Shirazi and senior scholars like Sheikh Muhammad al-Hajiri and Sheikh Yusuf al-Khorasani. He moved to Najaf to complete his advanced studies, and studied under Sayyid Abu al-Qasim al-Khoei, as well as the founder of the Islamic republic of Iran, Sayyid Ruhollah Khomeini.

He was exiled from Iraq and migrated to Iran, after the success of the Iranian revolution. He remained in Qom for a short while, and then moved to Mashhad, where he taught in its seminaries.

== Relationship with Khomeini ==
In Najaf, al-Shirazi attended the bahth kharij (advanced research seminars) classes of Khomeini, and from there on, he grew in close proximity with Khomeini. He would also go as far as being known as the "only Arab supporting Khomeini" in the Najaf seminary. He was granted ijtihad by Khomeini. al-Shirazi would write numerous verses of poetry supporting the Islamic republic, as well as poems in praise of Khomeini personally, the most known one being:

الخُـمَـيْـنِـي العَـظِـيـمْ
قَائِدُ الشَعْب الكَرِيمْ

Translation:

Khomeini the great,
Leader of the gracious people.

Al-Shirazi believed Khomeini to be senior to al-Khoei.

== Immigration to the United Kingdom ==
Al-Shirazi wasn't really affiliated with any of his marja' brothers, in fact ever since the inception of his religious education, he held relatively differing views to them, and took under the wing of Khomeini throughout the majority of his stay in Iraq. However, when the Shirazi's landed in Iran, and the disputes between his brother and Khomeini surfaced, al-Shirazi also began to harvest a dispute with Khomeini, but it was over his Sufi tendencies that al-Shirazi deemed deviance and kufr.

Due to family ties, and his differences on Islamic philosophy with Khomeini, al-Shirazi naturally became affiliated with his brother. Hence, after facing much pressures and discomfort in Mashhad, with some reports going as far as to say that al-Shirazi's house was at some point raided, whilst he was taken and tortured, he left Mashhad for London in 1994.

== Al-Baqi' 2009 protest ==
On 20 February 2009, Shia pilgrims gathered in Medina, at the al-Baqi' cemetery, to mark the anniversary of Prophet Muhammad's death. However, an incident took place where the religious police videotaped female pilgrims, a practice that was found offensive, and so a group of men asked the police to destroy or hand over the tapes, but they were denied. In response, on 24 February, many pilgrims gathered and protested in front of the cemetery and so the religious police began to attack them, and then the police interfered, arresting and injuring dozens of the pilgrims, as well as beating and assaulting them with knives.

Al-Shirazi released a very strong statement in the form a video, attacking the Saudi government, and King Abdullah personally. He called for the masjid al-haram and masjid al-nabawi, to be taken under management of the United Nations, and for the independence of the Eastern province, with its own sovereignty, referencing the independence of Pakistan from India. In response, there was a large uproar from the Saudi media towards al-Shirazi.

Al-Shirazi and his student, controversial Kuwaiti cleric, Sheikh Yasser al-Habib, were accused of provoking terror attacks against Sunni mosques, as a reaction to the al-Baqi' incident and the bombings (2006 and 2007) of the Askariayn shrine. However, al-Habib denied this, claiming:

"this was a call for the mosques–satanic temples–that are proven to be dens of criminal Wahabis and terrorists; the ones that call for the slaughter of the Shia. As for the ordinary Sunni mosques, it is strictly forbidden to be destroyed, even if it is a Bakri [Sunni] mosque."

== Controversy ==
Al-Shirazi adopted an insulting rhetoric towards Iran’s politicians and their supporters and is never hesitant of using obscene language towards his political rivals and opponents from different Islamic sects.

This rhetoric also extended to the use of profane words when condemning the Saudi government for the al-Baqi' 2009 incident.

== Fall out with al-Habib ==
Al-Shirazi was considered a mentor to Sheikh Yasser Al-Habib. However, they had a fall out in 2016, and are no longer affiliated.

== Works ==
Al-Shirazi has published numerous lectures and books about jurisprudence, principles of jurisprudence, Islamic philosophy and Sufism. Some of his works include:

=== Lectures ===
- al-Falsafa wal-Irfan (Islamic Philosophy and Gnosis). These are considered the largest chain of lectures on Gnosis and Sufism, as well as figures of Islamic mysticism.
- al-Sira al-Nabawiya (Biography of Muhammad)
- al-Sira al-Alawiya (Biography of Ali)
- al-Sira al-Sajadiya (Biography of Ali ibn al-Husayn)
- al-Sira al-Baqiriya (Biography of Muhammad ibn Ali)
- Ahl al-Bayt Fi al-Quran (Ahl al-Bayt in the Quran)
- Abu Bakr Fi al-Hadith (Abu Bakr in Hadith)

=== Books ===
- Falsafat Ta'adud al-Zawjat (The Islamic Philosophy of Polygamy)
- Ijtima'iyat al-Islam (Islamic Sociology)
- Hadhara Bari'a (Innocent Civilization)
- Hatha Rasool Allah (This is the Messenger of Allah)
- Diwan (Poetry collection)

== Personal life ==
Al-Shirazi is married to the daughter of Ayatollah Sayyid Ahmed Khatami, a contemporary of his father. He has two daughters and one son.

His son Mustafa is a cleric, and is married to Yasser al-Habib's sister.
