= Hassan al-Shirazi =

Iraqi-Iranian scholar and activist

Ayatollah Sayyid Hassan al-Shirazi
- السيد حسن الحسيني الشيرازي
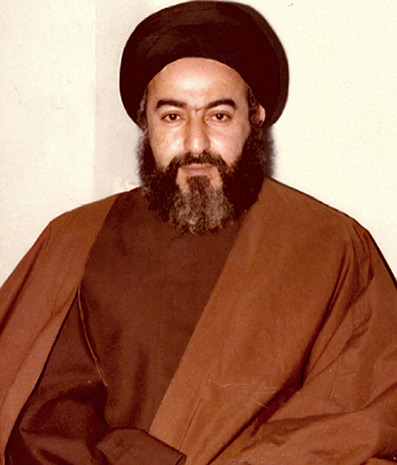

Personal life
- Born: 1935 Najaf, Kingdom of Iraq
- Died: 2 May 1980 (aged 44–45) Beirut, Lebanon
- Cause of death: Assassination
- Resting place: Fatima Masumeh Shrine
- Parent: Mirza Mahdi al-Shirazi (father)
- Relatives: Mirza Shirazi (great-great grandfather); Muhammad al-Shirazi (brother); Sadiq al-Shirazi (brother); Mujtaba al-Shirazi (brother); Mohammed Kadhim al-Modarresi (brother-in-law); Mohammed Kadhim al-Qazwini (brother-in-law)

Religious life
- Religion: Islam
- Jurisprudence: Twelver Shia Islam

Ayatollah Sayyid Hassan al-Husayni al-Shirazi. (Arabic: حسن الحسيني الشيرازي; Persian: حسن حسينى شيرازى; 1935–May 2, 1980) was an Iraqi Shia scholar, thinker, and poet. He was assassinated in Beirut allegedly at the hands of the Baathist intelligence.

Renowned Lebanese writer George Jordac, describes al-Shirazi as 'a clear mind, honest tongue, and lovable heart with a face that reflects the light of a generous soul'.

== Early life and education ==
Al-Shirazi was born to Mirza Mahdi al-Shirazi and Halima al-Shirazi. Both of his parents are from the distinguished clerical al-Shirazi family that emigrated from Shiraz to Karbala in the 19th century. He is the fourth of ten children. All of his brothers are clerics, and his brothers Muhammad al-Shirazi and Sadiq al-Shirazi are marja's. His mother is the great-granddaughter of Mirza Shirazi, the pioneer of the Tobacco Movement. His nephew, Mohammad Taqi al-Modarresi is also a marja'.

=== Education ===
He grew up in Karbala, and studied in its seminary under his father, his older brother, Muhammad and senior scholars like Sayyid Muhammad-Hadi al-Milani, Sheikh Muhammad-Ridha al-Isfahani, Sheikh Muhammad al-Hajiri and Sheikh Yusuf al-Khorasani. He quickly rose through the ranks, and became a prominent scholar in Islam.

== Activism ==
Al-Shirazi was an avid critic of the British-sponsored monarchy in Iraq, the communist tide that hit the country after the monarchy, as well as the Baathist regime that also followed. Along with his brother, Muhammad, he staged many protests and activities to counter the parties and their ideologies of communism and socialism. He used to display his sentiments in his poetry, that he would often recite in festivals and conferences set up in Karbala. In 1950, he set up the al-shabab al-husayni (transl. The youth of Husayn), a youth organisation, as part of his anti-communist campaign.

In 1963, during an annual function held in Karbala, commemorating the birth of Ali, al-Shirazi recited his renowned poem, za'imuna al-karrar (transl. Our leader, the valiant [Ali]), criticising Britains meddling with Iraqi politics, the Baath party, and specifically its founder, Michel Aflaq:

دستــورنــا القــرآن نهتــف باسمه
وشعــارنــا في العــالم الإســلام
وزعــيمــنا الكــرّار لا ميــشيــل لا
ماركس لا القسـيس لا الحاخــام

Translation:

The Quran is our constitution, which we call with,
and our symbol to the world is Islam.
Our leader is the valiant [Ali], not Michel, not-
Marx, not the priest, not the rabbi.

He also insults Aflaq by saying:

أو ليس قـد سمّاه يَـعربُ عفلقا
ولــديــه أحقــــاد الصــليب دمــاء
وأبــــوه جــاء لســوريا مستــعمراً
والأم بــــــاريــــســـيـــة عـــجـــمـــاء

Translation:

Did Ya'rub not call him Aflaq
Whilst he holds the grudges of the crusaders
His father came to Syria as an imperialist
Whilst his mother is a foreign Parisian

Because of this poem, al-Shirazi began to face pressures from the Baathists, that led to his immigration to Lebanon in 1964. Whilst in Lebanon, he founded Dar al-Sadiq, a publishing house that produced many Islamic books. He then returned to Iraq, before Abd al-Salam Arif 's death. He continued his activism, against Abd al-Salam, his brother Abd al-Rahman, and later the Baathists, who assumed full control with a bloodless coup against Abd al-Rahman. When Iranian religious exile Ruhollah Khomeini settled in Najaf in October 1965, he developed a close relationship with him and his son Mostafa. The Baathists imprisoned al-Shirazi in 1969, and tortured him along with a number of other scholars in the Nihahya Palace. Due to the intensity of the torture, he was transferred to the military hospital, and then to a prison in Baqubah. He was released that same year, and shortly after, in 1970, immigrated to Lebanon as a result of Mostafa Khomeini's suggestion. At first he sought treatment for the injuries he suffered under the torture of the Baathists. Then he resumed his activism, visiting many countries, and publishing more books and poetry. His goal in Lebanon was to find both individual and institutional supporters.

Through al-Shirazi's numerous visits to Saudi Arabia for the annual Hajj, he met with officials and the Muslim World League, and through them, in 1972, he managed to meet with King Faisal, where he discussed beginning the conversation in regards to rebuilding the Baqi cemetery. Al-Shirazi's effort is considered to be the most progressive when it comes to any action carried out in regards to the rebuilding of the cemetery. However these efforts came to a halt with his death. Murtadha al-Qazwini states that upon meeting Mohammed Suroor Sabban, he told him "the current wall that surrounds the cemetery was built due to the efforts of Muhammad al-Shirazi and his brother Hassan."

Al-Shirazi issued numerous statements against the Egypt–Israel peace treaty in 1979. He aided a lot of activist groups in Afghanistan against the communist influence of the Soviet Union.

== Legacy ==
=== Institutions ===
Al-Shirazi established two seminaries in the Levant. He set up the Imam al-Mehdi school for religious studies in Lebanon and in Syria, he founded the Zaynabiya Islamic Sciences Seminary in Sayyeda Zainab in 1975.

=== Books ===
- Kalimat Allah (The word of Allah)
- Kalimat al-Rasool al-Adham (The word of the messenger)
- al-Adab al-Muwajah (Directed literature)
- Kalimat al-Imam al-Hassan (The word of Imam Hassan)
- Ilah al-Kawn (The lord of the universe)
- al-Sha'aer al-Husayniya (The Husyani Symbols). ISBN 9781514298619.
- Injazat al-Rasool (The accomplishments of the messenger)
- Ahdaf al-Islam (The goals of Islam)
- Rasool al-Hayat (The messenger of life)

== Death ==
On Friday, 2 May 1980, al-Shirazi was on his way to Borj El Brajneh to attend the funeral of Muhammad Baqir al-Sadr, who was assassinated in Iraq at the hands of the Baathists along with his sister, Bint al-Huda. Al-Shirazi was in a taxi, and then two cars showed up on either side of the taxi, allegedly carrying Baathist intelligence officers, who sprayed the taxi with bullets. Thirteen bullets hit al-Shirazi, mostly in his head, killing him.

His corpse was transferred to Qom, Iran, where Ayatollah Marashi Najafi led the funeral prayers, and al-Shirazi's body rested in the Fatima Masumeh Shrine.

== See also ==
- Mirza Mahdi al-Shirazi
- Muhammad al-Shirazi
- Musa al-Sadr
