= Sadiq al-Shirazi =

Iranian Grand Ayatollah (born 1942)

Grand Ayatollah Sayyid Sadiq al-Shirazi
- صادق الشيرازي
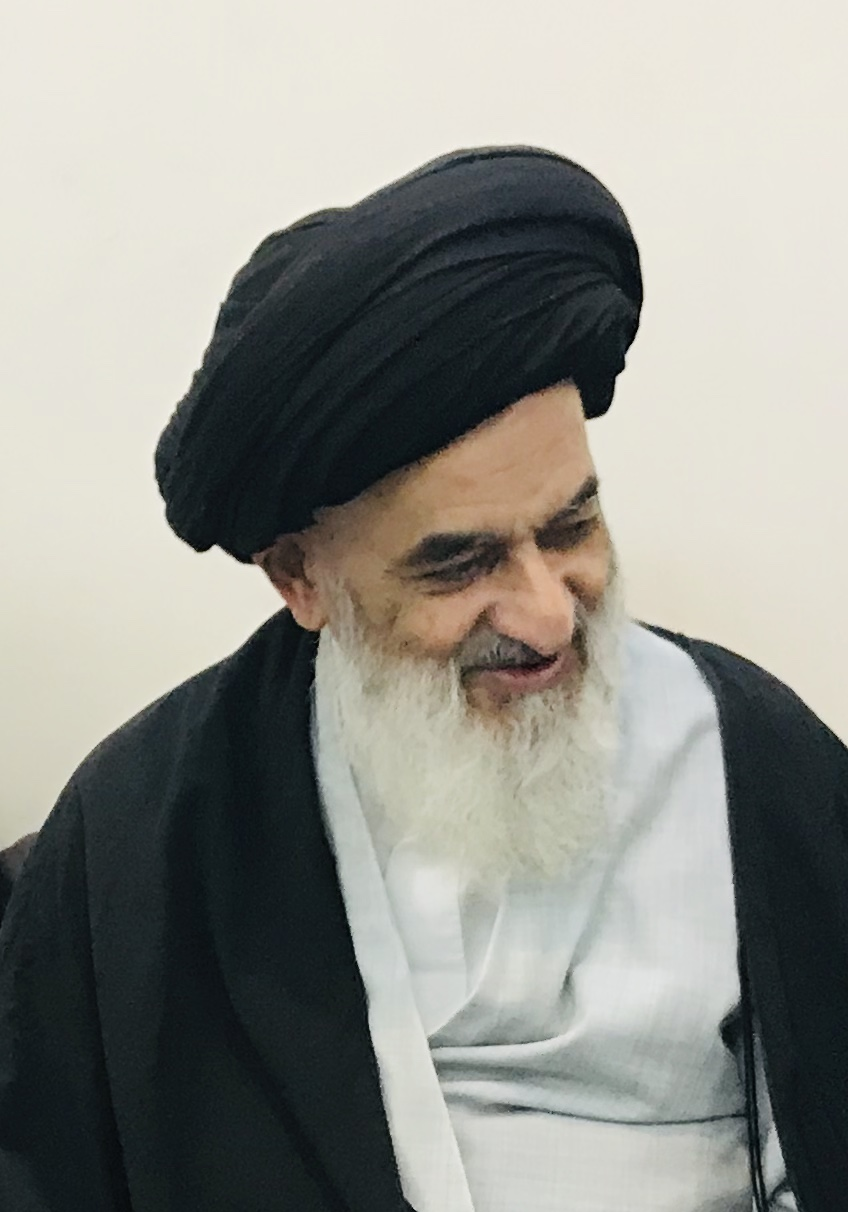
- Shirazi in 2019

Personal life
- Born: 20 August 1942 (age 84) Karbala, Kingdom of Iraq
- Children: Ali; Hussein; Ahmed; Jafar
- Parent: Mirza Mahdi al-Shirazi (father)
- Relatives: Mirza Shirazi (great-great grandfather); Mohammad al-Shirazi (brother); Hassan al-Shirazi (brother); Mujtaba al-Shirazi (brother); Mohammed Kadhim al-Modarresi (brother-in-law); Mohammed Kadhim al-Qazwini (brother-in-law)
- Website: shirazi.ir

Religious life
- Religion: Islam
- Denomination: Shi'a
- Sect: Twelver
- Jurisprudence: Ja'fari
- Creed: Usuli
- Movement: Shirazi

Muslim leader
- Based in: Qom, Iran

Grand Ayatollah Seyyed Sadiq al-Hussayni al-Shirazi (Arabic: صادق الحسيني الشيرازي; Persian: سید صادق حسینی شیرازی; born 20 August 1942) is an Iraqi-born Iranian Shia marja'.

He hails from an influential transnational clerical family, and is the younger brother of Muhammad al-Shirazi, and considered his successor.

== Early life and education ==
Al-Shirazi was born in Karbala to Mirza Mahdi al-Shirazi, a grand ayatollah, and Halima al-Shirazi. Both of his parents were from the distinguished clerical al-Shirazi family that emigrated from Shiraz to Karbala in the 19th century. All of his brothers are clerics, and Mohammad al-Shirazi was a marja'. His mother was the great-granddaughter of Mirza Shirazi, the pioneer of the Tobacco Movement. His nephew, Mohammad Taqi al-Modarresi is also a marja'.

=== Education ===
He began his religious education in Karbala, under his father and older brothers Muhammad and Hasan. After completing his primary education, he studied under Sayyid Muhammad-Hadi al-Milani, Sheikh Muhammad-Ridha al-Isfahani, Sheikh Muhammad al-Shahroudi, Sheikh Muhammad al-Karbassi, Sheikh Jafar al-Rashti and Sheikh Muhammad-Husayn al-Mazindarani.

In 1971, he was exiled from Iraq by the Baathist regime. He settled in Kuwait for a while with his older brother, Muhammad. He and his family then migrated to Iran, after the Islamic revolution. He resumed classes under his brother, until he gained ijtihad, and began his own classes. He has been residing in Qom ever since he moved in 1980.

== Marja'iyya ==
After his brother, Muhammad, died in 2001, he succeeded him as marja'.

al-Shirazi believes not against the Guardianship of the Islamic Jurist in principle, but opposes how the supreme leaders have carried out the concept by concentrating all state control in a single jurist who is virtually impossible to remove from power.

=== Clashes with Iranian Government ===
al-Shirazi's marja'iyya was relatively quieter than his late brothers. However, after the emergence of controversial Kuwaiti cleric, Yasser al-Habib, and his claimed affiliation with al-Shirazi–al-Shirazi's marja'iyya was placed under scrutiny. Iranian hardliner and Khamenei’s official representative to UK, Mohsen Araki, has accused al-Shirazi of “receiving funds from Britain and Saudi Arabia”, and is “aggravated” by al-Shirazi's efforts for the al-Askari shrine on the last Friday of Ramadan, instead of supporting or rallying for Khomeini’s Quds day.

al-Shirazi has never denied anyone's self-proclaimed affiliations to him, but has announced that no person or body represents him, other than Marjayeat TV, which represents his official opinion.

=== Length of fasts ===
In the Summer, fasts in some countries become extremely long, because the day light hours are extended. Hence, there has been an increased discussion on whether there is a maximum length of a fast, including many schools banning fasting for children. al-Shirazi holds a distinguished ruling to this, where his rationale is to change the length of the fast to a maximum of what is "normal" and there is no need to repeat the fast.

His view is a minority ruling, only shared by Sheikh Nasser Makarim Shirazi (in a slightly different version) and a few other jurists. al-Shirazi believes a maximum of 17.5 hour fast from Fajr (and minimum of 6 hours fast which might apply in some northern areas in winter). This is based on an interpretation of what the urf (common) is, and understanding the terms layl (night) and nahar (day) when fasting is referred to in the Quran and Hadith, i.e. what a normal person would understand when hearing these words. Therefore, fasting in extreme temperatures for extreme lengths of time is not what is understood by the urf when the verses are read. Proponents of this view, say that the urf would expect that fasting is what is mu'tadil (normal) i.e. say 17.5 hours. He explicitly says that this is due to the understanding of the words above, not due to la haraj (principle that states no Islamic law can be the cause of extreme hardship) i.e. even if it does not cause difficulty, you are still required to fast a maximum of 17.5 hours

The consequence of the viewpoint of al-Shirazi (as well as Makarim Shirazi) is that if the fast is longer than 17.5 hours, you should revert to times with mu'tadil lengths of day e.g. Mecca or Karbala which could be 14–16 hours.

== Works ==
al-Shirazi has published numerous books on jurisprudence and principles of jurisprudence. Some of them include:

- Commentaries on 'Urwatul-Wuthqa. 20 volumes.
- Commentaries on al-Lum'a al- Dimashqiya. 10 volumes.
- Islamic Politics
- Ali in the Qur'an. 2 volumes.
- Fatima al-Zahra' in the Qur'an
- The Truth about the Shi'a
- The Shi'a in the Qur'an
- Qiyas in the Islamic Shari'ah
- Congregational Prayer and its Status in Islam
- Shirazi, Ayatollah Sayed Sadiq (8 September 2017), The Mahdi in the Quran, CreateSpace Independent Publishing Platform, ISBN 9781976235795
- The Aroma of Mercy, CreateSpace Independent Publishing Platform, 31 August 2014, ISBN 9781501023064
- Shirazi, Ayatollah Sayyid Sadiq (24 August 2016), Inspirational Quotes, CreateSpace Independent Publishing Platform, ISBN 9781537277899
- The Guide to Hajj Rites - The Rulings and Procedures of Hajj, ISBN 9781312511675
- Shirazi, Ayatollah Sadiq (9 May 2013), A Summary of Logic, CreateSpace Independent Publishing Platform, ISBN 9781484082355
- Shirazi, Ayatollah Sayyid Sadiq (8 January 2015), The Prophet Muhammad the Best Leader for Mankind, CreateSpace Independent Publishing Platform, ISBN 9781506169392
- Shirazi, Sayyed Sadiq; Shirazi, Ayatullah Sayyed (6 January 2014), Der Sich-Erhebende Im Quran [The Awaited One in the Quran], CreateSpace Independent Publishing Platform, ISBN 9781494897468

== Personal life ==
Sadiq al-Shirazi is married and has five sons (Ali, Hussein, Ahmed ,Shamshad and Jafar). His sons are all clerics. His son Hussein plays a key role in running al-Shirazi's office. He spreads his father's teachings, on a number of media outlet platforms including four satellite channels.

On 6 March 2018, his son, Hussein was arrested reportedly by the IRGC as he appeared at the Special Clerical Court. He was prosecuted after a lecture comparing Iran's government—the Guardianship of the Islamic Jurist (velayat-e faqih)—to a regime of "pharaohs". His arrest fuelled debates on whether Iran's supreme leader Ali Khamenei should be able to claim divine sanction for unlimited state powers. Protests against his arrest were held at the Iranian consulate in Karbala, Basra and Najaf, Kuwait City and Iran's embassies in Baghdad and London. He was released on bail on 18 March.

On 11 August 2024, it was reported that his eldest son, Ali, had died in Qom due to “a terminal illness”.

== See also ==
- Ali al-Sistani
- Abdollah Javadi Amoli
- Abu al-Qasim al-Khoei
- Muhammad Hossein Naini
- Muhammad Kazim Khurasani
- Mirza Husayn Tehrani
- Abdallah Mazandarani
- Mirza Ali Aqa Tabrizi
- Mirza Sayyed Mohammad Tabatabai
- Seyyed Abdollah Behbahani
- Muhammad al-Shirazi
- Hossein Wahid Khorasani
- Muhammad-Hadi al-Milani
- Khoddam Al-Mahdi
