= Mohammed Ridha al-Shirazi =

Iraqi-Iranian Ayatollah

Ayatollah Sayyid Muhammad-Ridha al-Shirazi
- السيد محمد رضا الحسيني الشيرازي
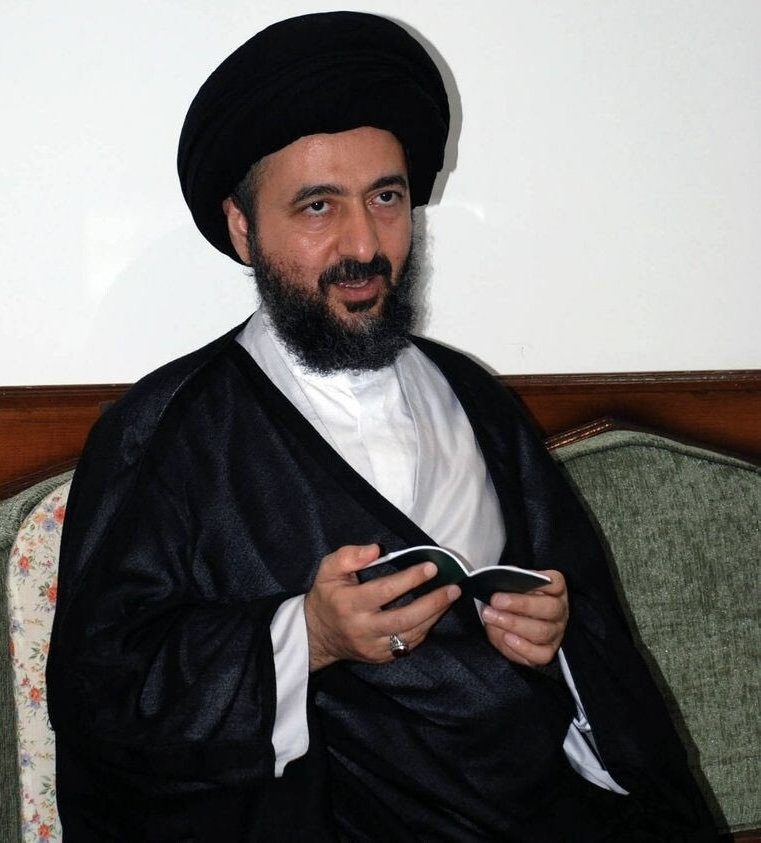
- Al-Shirazi In 2006

Personal life
- Born: 1959 Karbala, Iraq
- Died: 1 June 2008 (aged 48–49) Qom, Iran
- Resting place: Imam Husayn Mosque, Karbala, Iraq
- Children: Muhammad-Hassan; Muhammad-Baqir
- Parent: Muhammad al-Shirazi (father)
- Relatives: Mirza Shirazi (great-great grandfather); Mirza Mahdi al-Shirazi (grandfather); Sadiq al-Shirazi (uncle); Mohammad Taqi al-Modarresi (cousin)

Religious life
- Religion: Islam
- Denomination: Twelver Shīʿā

Muslim leader
- Students: Sheikh Yasser Al-Habib

Ayatollah Sayyid Muhammad-Ridha al-Husayni al-Shirazi (Arabic: محمد رضا الحسيني الشيرازي; 1959 – 1 June 2008) was an Iraqi Shia scholar, and the eldest son of Muhammad al-Shirazi.

He was considered to be the 'hope for the future of Islam.' The reason was mainly because of his ability to move those whose attended his lectures. It was widely understood that he would soon replace Ayatollah Sadiq al-Shirazi as Marja, and succeed as the future head of the family.

== Early life and education ==
Born in Karbala, to Sayyid Muhammad al-Shirazi, and Zainab Maash, he comes from the prominent al-Shirazi family of Shia scholars, who claim ancestry from Zayd ibn Ali, the son of the fourth Shiite Imam, Ali ibn Husayn. He is the great-great grandson of Mirza Shirazi from his father's mother's side. His mother was the daughter of Muhammad-Salih Maash, a well known merchant in Karbala.

=== Education ===
His education began at a very young age, he spent his basic levels of seminary studies at the hawza of Karbala. He then emigrated to Kuwait in 1971, along with his father and uncle due to the Bathist pressure in Iraq, and continued to study under his uncle Sadiq al-Shirazi and cousin Muhammad-Taqi al-Modarresi.

In 1980, he moved to Iran and settled in Qom. Over there he spent his advanced levels of seminary studies, and excelled quickly under his father and uncle, as well as senior religious clerics such as Grand Ayatollah Vahid Khorasani and Mirza Jawad Tabrizi. He gained the degree of ijtihad from his father, his uncle Grand Ayatollah Sadiq al-Shirazi, Grand Ayatollah Muhammad al-Fatimi al-Abhari, Grand Ayatollah Yadollah Duzduzani, Grand Ayatollah Jafar Sobhani, Ayatollah Ahmed Shahristani, Ayatollah Ridha Sadr, Grand Ayatollah Murtadha al-Ardikani.

By 1989, he began to supervise bahth kharij (advanced research seminars) in jurisprudence and principles of jurisprudence.

== Works ==
=== Books ===
Al-Shirazi authored many books. He wrote books at different academic levels; some directed at senior clerics, and others at the general public. Some of his books are:

- al-Rasool al-Atham: Ra'id al-Hadhara al-Insaniya (The Great Messenger: Leader of Human Civilisation)
- al -Tadabor Fi al-Qur'an (Reflecting In The Quran)
- al-Imam al-Husayn: Athama Ilahiya Wa Ataa' Bila Hidood (Imam Husayn: Divine Greatness and Limitless Altruism)
- al-Sha'aer al-Husayniya (The Husayni Symbols)
- al-Zahra al-Faisal Wa al-Qudwa (Zahra: The Arbiter and Role Model

=== Lectures ===
Al-Shirazi gave over five thousand lectures in the science of Quran exegesis, principles of Islamic jurisprudence, Islamic scholastic theology, creed, manners, family, history and Arabic literature.

== Death ==
Al-Shirazi was found dead in the kitchen of his home in Qom, in the early hours of Sunday, 1 June 2008. He was then taken to Karbala, and buried in the Imam Husayn Shrine near his grandfather Mirza Mehdi. His death was sudden and considered to be due to a chronic disease. However, no death certificate was issued.

=== Murder Allegation ===
Followers of al-Shirazi denied his death to be of natural cause or a chronic disease, rather they believe he was murdered. al-Shirazi had carried out some medical tests a week before his passing, and showed no signs of concern. He had no previous known illnesses, except for a slipped disc, and was arguably leading a relatively healthy life.

His family found him on the floor, with nothing surrounding him close enough, to hit him on his way down to the floor. They had seen bruises and dark marks across his face, head and neck. The marks can be seen in the pictures and videos of his corpse, that were released briefly after his burial. It is also claimed that a death certificate was not issued from the hospital, despite it being unlawful in Iran for a corpse to leave a hospital without a death certificate. On Wednesday, 3 June, the corpse was sent to Karbala to be buried, and in Karbala, those responsible for the burial had to change his shroud, because the original from Qom, was stained with blood streaming from the three areas on his face where the marks can be seen.

A source alleged that al-Shirazi's blood was tested for chemicals in a lab in Baghdad, and the result came in positive for a strange chemical substance.

=== Funeral ===
Al-Shirazi's funeral saw the attendance of many religious authorities as well as notable politicians including Ibrahim al-Jafari and Ahmed al-Chalabi.
