= Mohammad al-Shirazi =

Iranian-Iraqi Shia marja' and political activist (1928–2001)

Grand Ayatollah Sayyid Muhammad al-Shirazi
- السيد محمد الحسيني الشيرازي
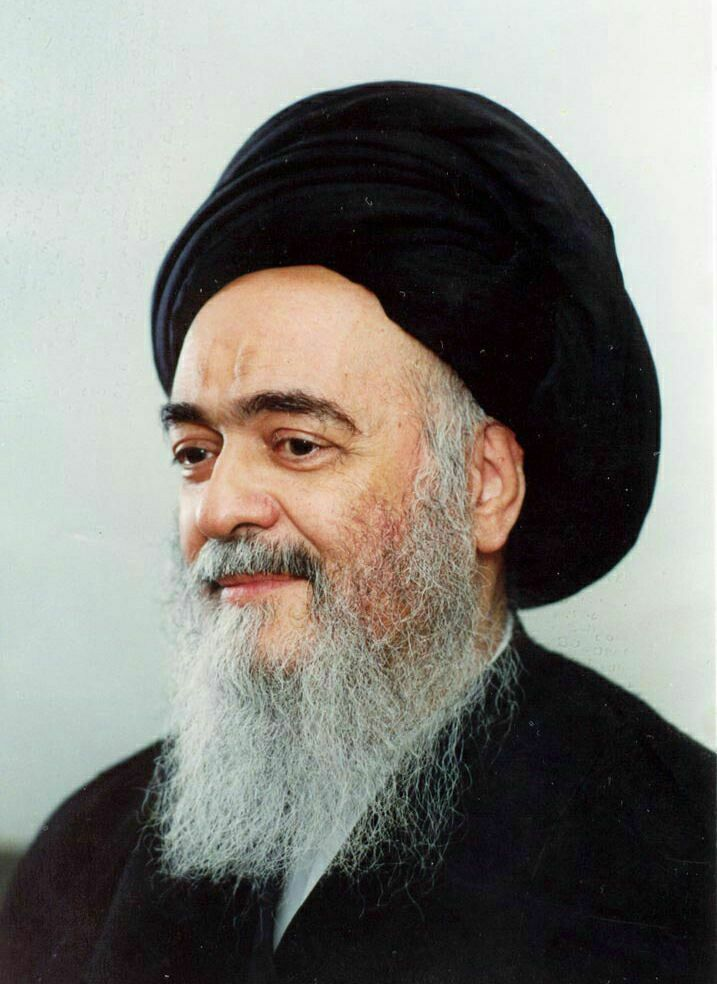

Personal life
- Born: 31 August 1928 Najaf, Mandatory Iraq
- Died: 17 December 2001 (aged 73) Qom, Iran
- Resting place: Fatima Masumeh Shrine
- Children: Muhammad-Ridha; Murtadha; Jafar; Mahdi; Muhammad-Ali; Muhammad-Husayn
- Parent: Mirza Mahdi al-Shirazi (father)
- Other names: Sultan al-Mu'alifin, Arabic: سلطان المؤلفين
- Relatives: Mirza Shirazi (great-great grandfather); Sadiq al-Shirazi (brother); Hassan al-Shirazi (brother); Mujtaba al-Shirazi (brother); Razi Shirazi (second cousin); Mohammed Kadhim al-Modarresi (brother-in-law); Mohammed Kadhim al-Qazwini (brother-in-law)
- Website: www.alshirazi.com/

Religious life
- Religion: Shia Islam
- Denomination: Shi'a
- Sect: Twelver
- Jurisprudence: Ja'fari (Usuli)
- Movement: Shirazi

Grand Ayatollah Sayyid Muhammad al-Husayni al-Shirazi (Arabic: محمد الحسيني الشيرازي; Persian: محمد حسينى شيرازى; 31 August 1928 – 17 December 2001), commonly known as Imam Shirazi, was an Iraqi Shia marja' and political activist.

== Early life and education ==
Al-Shirazi was born to Mirza Mahdi al-Shirazi and Halima al-Shirazi in Najaf. Both of his parents are from the distinguished clerical al-Shirazi family that emigrated from Shiraz to Karbala in the 19th century. He is the first of ten children. All of his brothers are clerics, and Sadiq al-Shirazi is a marja'. His mother is the great-granddaughter of Mirza Shirazi, the pioneer of the Tobacco Movement. His nephew, Mohammad Taqi al-Modarresi is also a marja'.

=== Education ===
He grew up and studied briefly in Najaf, and moved to Karbala with his father in 1937. He remained in Karbala studying in its seminary under his father, as well as prominent scholars like Sayyid Hossein Tabatabaei Qomi, Sayyid Muhammad-Hadi al-Milani, Sheikh Muhammad-Ridha al-Isfahani, Sayyid Zain al-Abiden al-Kashani and Sheikh Jafar al-Rashti. He was granted an ijaza by Grand Ayatollahs Sayyid Muhsin al-Hakim, Sayyid Abd al-Hadi al-Shirazi, and Sayyid Ahmed al-Khawansari to lead the seminary of Karbala after the death of his father, in 1961. al-Milani also announced al-Shirazi's capability to numerous notable figures, including Agha Bozorg al-Tehrani who mentions this in his Tabaqat al-A'lam.

== Base in Kuwait ==
In 1971, he was exiled to Lebanon by the Baathist regime for organizing protests in Baghdad. From Lebanon, al-Shirazi travelled to Kuwait, where he settled for nine years. After his nephews joined, al-Shirazi turned Kuwait into the base of Shiite scholarship.

At the time al-Shirazi came into conflict with other prominent Shia religious figures in Najaf. The most prominent Shia religious leader of the time, Grand Ayatollah Abu al-Qasim al-Khoei, sought to dismiss al-Shirazi's status as a scholar.

Through personal charisma and intellectual arguments, al-Shirazi built up a large following in Kuwait and Iraq. His followers became known as the 'Shiraziyyin' and tended to be critical of existing Shi'i religious establishments.

== Theory of clerical rule ==
al-Shirazi was a leading Islamist political theorist and devised the Hukumat al-Fuqaha' principle of theocratic rule. According to Cambridge University's Toby Matthiesen: "The political theory of Muhammad al-Shirazi and the MVM [Movement of Vanguard Missions] was quite close to Khomeini’s notion of velayet-e faqih (the guardianship of the jurisprudent), although al-Shirazi favored the theory that not a single cleric, but a council of scholars should govern the Islamic State (hukumat al-fuqaha’/shurat al-fuqaha’)."

Under al-Shirazi's theory government would be in the form of a 'Consultative System of Leadership' composed of senior clerics, and he called for the establishment of the 'Leadership Council of Religious Authorities'. He argued for the establishment of a Universal Islamic Government to encompass all the Muslim countries run in accordance with Hukumat al-Fuqaha'.

== Iranian Revolution ==
After the Islamic revolution, al-Shirazi moved to Qom. al-Shirazi was initially an important figure within Iran's Islamic Republic with his supporters in key roles within the Iranian state in the 1980s. He was the spiritual guide of the Movement of Vanguard Missionaries, an umbrella group for Iran-based Islamist paramilitaries that included military groups like the Islamic Front for the Liberation of Bahrain. Iran maintained support for these paramilitaries in the 1980s through the Office of Liberation Movements, part of the Revolutionary Guards. The Movement of Vanguard Missionaries operated as a military organisation and it was active in Bahrain and Iraq.

He has been critical of the Iranian government.

== Iran power struggle ==
Grand Ayatollah Al-Shirazi expected a bigger role in the Islamic Revolution and this was a point of tension between him and Grand Ayatollah Khomeini. In addition, Al-Shirazi believed he was the senior cleric to Khomeini, as both competed for the position of marja al-taqlid. As the revolution progressed Al-Shirazi fell out with Ayatollah Khomeini and particularly his successor, Grand Ayatollah Ali Khamenei.

The Movement of Vanguard Missionaries was close to radicals in the Iranian government within the Revolutionary Guards. As the radicals were increasingly sidelined by the more moderate Sayyid ‘Ali Khamenei and ‘Ali-Akbar Hashemi Rafsanjani, Al-Shirazi's influence waned. Al-Shirazi was highly critical of Khamenei's bid to become a marja and assumption of the position of Iranian supreme leader.

With the political ascendency of Khamenei and Rafsanjani, Al-Shirazi's followers were at times mistreated by the government of the Iranian authorities. In 1995, one of his sons Seyd Morteza Shirazi was imprisoned for 18 months after which "reportedly escaped to Syria and has requested political asylum, the INP reported in Tehran."

Amnesty International reports that in Iran:

several followers of Grand Ayatollah Sayed Mohammad Shirazi were detained during [1998]. In January Sheikh Mohammad Amin Ghafoori, a well-known religious figure and writer, his wife, and Sayed Hossein Fali were arrested in Qom. There were reports that they were beaten during arrest and tortured in detention. Sayed Hossein Fali was reported to have been released in June. Sheikh Mohammad Amin Ghafoori was said to have been sentenced in July to two and a half years' imprisonment by the Special Court for the Clergy, whose procedures fell far short of international standards. In October, five other followers of Grand Ayatollah Shirazi, including Reza Sultani, were reported to have been arrested and they remained held incommunicado at the end of the year. Sheikh Sadiq Za'eemiyan has also been harassed.

Seven students arrested in November 1995, apparently on account of their links with Grand Ayatollah Shirazi (see Amnesty International Reports 1996 and 1997), were released in June. However, two of them, Aman Allah Bushehri and Sheikh Mohammad Qahtani, were reportedly rearrested in July and August respectively.

According to reports, methods of torture used against some of these detainees have included beatings, prolonged sleep deprivation, electric shocks and threatened execution by electrocution after attaching electrodes to the body. Sheikh Ali Maash is said to have required medical treatment after his release for the effects of torture, including for a toe on his right foot which was broken and left untreated."

Despite these differences, Al-Shirazi's followers were part of the most pro-Iranian political faction in the post-Saddam Iraq, the United Iraqi Alliance. The Shirazis' Islamic Action Organization contested parliamentary elections along with other pro-Iranian parties such as the Badr Organization and SCIRI as part of the United Iraqi Alliance. In 2006, the Islamic Action Organization had one minister in government in Iraq, the State Minister for Civil Society Affairs, Adil al-Asadi.

== Literary contributions ==
Al-Shirazi has written on different subjects including science, ethics, politics, economics, sociology, law, human rights, etc. He has published over 1200 books, treatises and studies. Assad Ali, a poet and professor of Arabic literature, called him the "King of Authors", because of his prolific output. A bid by Assad Ali to get the Guinness World Records to recognise Muhammad al-Shirazi as the most prolific writer in Arabic was rejected by the publisher.

Al-Shirazi believed in the fundamental and elementary nature of freedom including freedom of expression, political plurality, debate and discussion, tolerance and forgiveness. Regarding war and violence he advocated war as a last resort in response to an enemy who has forced the situation. He called for the Jizyah tax to be imposed on non-Muslims saying 'The obstinate person should become less obstinate in the face of what should return him gradually to the truth.' He believed in the "Consultative System of Leadership" and called for the establishment of the Leadership Council of Religious Authorities. He called for the establishment of the Universal Islamic Government to encompass all the Muslim countries. These and other ideas are discussed in detail in his books.

He had established many Islamic centers, medical and charitable financial services, educational, welfare and social foundations, libraries, and Hawzah's, or universities for Islamic Studies, in different regions of the world. Hundreds of individuals have graduated from his schools as scholars, lecturers, authors and intellectuals.

== Death ==
After many years of being under the house arrest, Grand Ayatollah Shirazi died on Monday, 17 December 2001 in Qom. After his death, his legacy and school of thought were continued through his seminary. His brother Sadiq al-Shirazi is at the helm of this school of thought and is continuing his late brother’s legacy and work.

== Legacy ==
Although he was under house arrest for a long time, people who often saw him said he never insulted the former supreme guide, Khomeini, or the current one, Ali Khamenei, although his relations with them were not good. According to his visitors, he used to say: “Allah have mercy on a man who shows me my faults.”

=== Works ===
- War, Peace & Nonviolence: An Islamic Perspective
- The Qur'an: When was it compiled?
- On the question of the Bible and Christianity
- Islamic Beliefs For All
- The Family
- Hajj: Duties and Rulings
- If Islam were to be established
- The Islamic System of Government
- God And His Prophets In The Bible (1960)

=== Establishments ===
- al-Rasool al-Adham Mosque. Kuwait.
- al-Rasool al-Adham Seminary. Kuwait.
- Husayniyat al-Rasool al-Adham. Kuwait.
- Husayniyat al-Rasool al-Adham. London.
- Imam Ali Center. Washington DC.
