= Zainab Pasha =

19th-century Iranian protestor

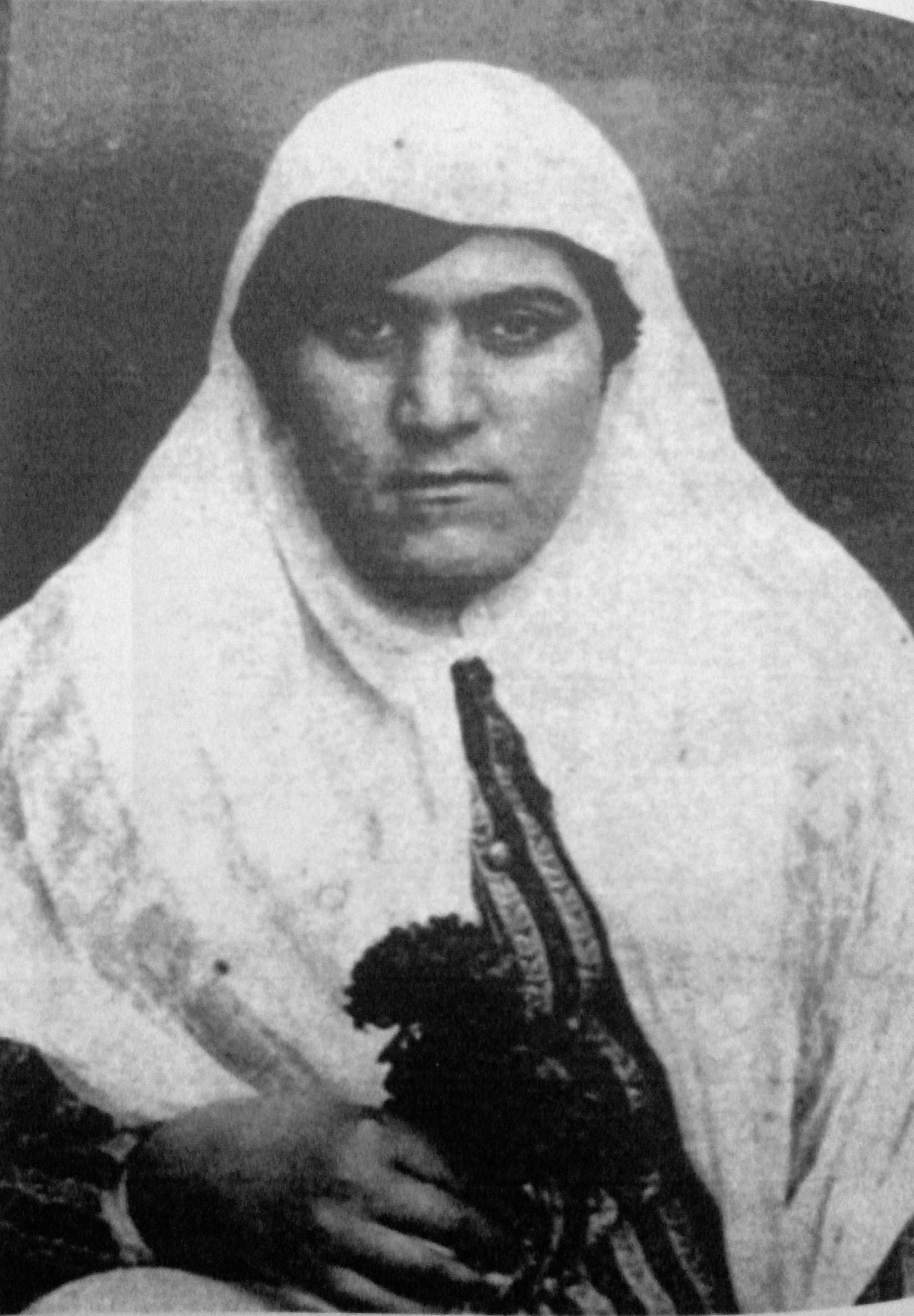
Zainab Pasha

Zainab Pasha (Persian: زینب پاشا) was an Iranian woman who lived during the Qajar era in late 19th century. She is most notable for her role in the Tobacco Protest, the beginning of the Persian Constitutional Revolution, and for leading a group of women in an uprising in the city of Tabriz by attacking wealthy merchants. This led to the closure of the Bazaar of Tabriz.

== Life ==
Zainab was born to a country style family in one of the old Tabriz villages named, Amuzin al-Din. Her father, Sheikh Sulayman, was a poor peasant who, like other villagers, had a hard time subsisting during that era. Zainab was a strong and sturdy woman. Although at that time in Tabriz, most women covered their faces, Zainab did not.

Before the Persian Constitutional Revolution and during the autocracy, there was no security in Iran so government officials bought wheat during the summer at reduced prices and kept the wheat in warehouses. In the winter, government officials sold the wheat to the poor at high prices which created artificial famines. During the reign of Naser al-Din Shah Qajar c. 1834, the artificial famine reached its peak, and the poor people of the city had great difficulty. This harsh environment caused Zainab Pasha along with other women to revolt.

Zainab and her revolutionaries closed markets and attacked government headquarters. They also attacked and destroyed some expensive gourmet groceries and large bakeries.

=== Influences ===
For almost a century and for the first time in Iran's history, Zainab along with forty women of Tabriz that were against the oppressors, and in parallel with the sexual inequalities imposed by the feudal system and traditional views on women, started an armed struggle and fought bravely. One of the important factors of the Tabriz Women's Movement led by Zainab was the overwhelming tyranny of some princes and rulers of the Qajar era in Iran.

In the social and political arena of this period, there were also important problems such as the "Bread Crisis" and "Tobacco Score", which were also among the most important factors that led the Women's Movement of Tabriz. One of the biggest social and economic problems of the Qajar era was also bread shortage and the expensive price of bread. So, this led the women's uprising and dealing with this dilemma.

=== Tobacco Protest ===
Zainab Pasha’s reputation was actually known after the Tobacco Protest. When Naser al-Din Shah gave the tobaccos to the British, the people of Iran wanted to prevent this cycle from proceeding forward. During those days, Hajji Mirza Javad, a well-known political cleric, sent his disciples to the market and invited the people to close their stores. The people obeyed his request and did what he had asked for. It didn’t pass too long as the government intimidated the people and defeated them. So this brought some dozen brave women under the leadership and command of Zainab Pasha to fight and get the market back to the people. These women were known to defeat and destroy any corruption that took place at that time in Iran, and nobody knew their identities.

Finally, because of the intense opposition of the people, Naser al-Din Shah was forced to cancel the tobacco credits that was given to Britain. But the non-stop struggle of Zainab Pasha along with the other women continued. It was also said that Zainab along with her women combatants appeared in many streets and places encouraging the people especially the men to fight against oppression. She once said to the men that if you don’t dare and are afraid to fight the thieves and looters that are stealing your wealth and honor of your homeland, then take the women's veil and sit in the house. Don’t talk about men and bravery! Then she threw her scarf towards them, and disappeared from the sight of the amazed audience.

=== Bread crisis in Tabriz ===
In the Qajar era, bread was one of the most important and most critical economic problems of the people. It was said that during this period there were many protests due to the lack of bread. Famine and drought were the main reasons of bread shortage. This was done by the government as they bought wheat from the villagers in a low price and stored them in warehouses until the end of winter. Then when people needed flour, they sold the wheats to them in a very high price. Most of the time, people had to wait in long queues, in front of the bakeries, just to buy a piece of bread which was also very expensive.

Women often took the lead in protesting the critical situation of bread. An example of this operation, was Zainab Pasha and her followers. The operation took place in the late Naser al-Din Shah's famine that was caused by the persecution of wheat. Women decided to demonstrate. So, approximately 3,000 women came to the market, and forced the marketers to close their shops and join the rally. The government informed Gheshoon Maragheh and ordered the troops to shoot. About five women and a seyyed were killed. In this rally, some great clerks also joined the women. They sat in the Russian consulate and prevented three volunteers from leaving the scene, and treated them with violence. On the next day of the rally, three women and some were killed and wounded. This led the slogans in the rally to become political against the Qajar monarchy and made the government to retreat once again.

=== Confiscation of Deputy Mirza Abdul Rahim’s warehouse ===
Another important operation of Zainab Pasha and her followers was the confiscation of Mirza Abdul Rahim’s warehouse who was the deputy ambassador of Iran. He was in charge of bringing famine and bread shortage. So the women could no longer tolerate the condition they were in. They said that if the men won’t do anything such as fighting, then we will do this as ourselves. So, Zainab ordered her women combatants to prepare for an attack to the market and due to the fears of the marketers, they all closed their stores and stepped aside. Their rally started to protest towards the deputy’s house. The deputy ordered his troops to shoot at the demonstrators and the rally turned into a bloody massacre. Crown Prince Mozaffar ad-Din Mirza announced that many had been killed and that they weren’t afraid of the bullets or of being killed. He sent a message to the people to keep their patience and by tomorrow he will make the prices fair again. But, Zainab did not listen to these words and told the crowd not to surrender and show that they are on their requests.

=== Attack on Nezam Al-Alma’s warehouse ===
It was said that Nezam Al-Alama had the Shah’s permission to sell his wheat whenever he wanted to. So, Zainab decides to attack his warehouse. After identifying the location of the warehouse, she prepared the attack plan. In order to attack, she made a flag with her own veil and used it as a sign for her troops to outbreak. Once they seized the warehouse, she divided all the wheat in it between the hungry people.

== Legacy ==
The last thing known about Zainab Pasha’s life and destiny comes back when she along with a caravan goes to Karbala for pilgrimage. Even though, she was considered an elderly woman at that time, but never lost her fighting spirit.

Zainab who had gone to Karbala with some people, stayed in Khanaqin. Some Ottoman soldiers who had come to investigate them before reaching Karbala, were hardened by Zainab who was angry with their behaviors. She also encouraged the people around there to rebuke the soldiers and attacked them. Then she continued her path and went to Karbala. According to sources, after this event, no further news was heard about Zainab Pasha. It seems that Zainab had died during her last visit, and her body was never transferred to Tabriz and her birthplace, Amuzin al-Din, and was buried in Karbala.

=== Poetry ===
Mirza Farrokh, was a poet, who himself witnessed Zainab's struggles and wrote many Turkish poems about her so that the people of Tabriz could understand. He was the first poet to write about Zainab and always pointed out to the bravery and heroism of Zainab during her attacks.

=== Men's Rise ===
Zainab Pasha gave strong and heavy speeches on the streets to call on men for uprising. An example of her speech to the men: “If you do not dare to fight oppression, and if you are afraid to fight with the thieves and looters who are stealing your wealth, honor, and, homeland, then sit in the corridor of your house. We will fight against the wrongdoers instead of you”.

Her movements and speeches braved the men and made them to rise up.

== See also ==
- Women in the Persian Constitutional Revolution
- Women's rights movement in Iran
- Women's rights in Iran
