= Razi Shirazi =

Iraqi-born Iranian Shia philosopher (1927–2021)

Ayatollah Sayyid Radhi Shirazi
- سید رضی حسینی شیرازی
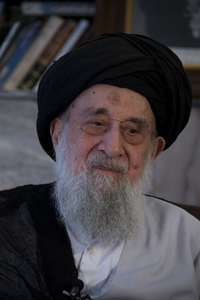

Personal life
- Born: 29 March 1927 Najaf, Mandatory Iraq
- Died: 1 December 2021 (aged 94) Tehran, Iran
- Resting place: Imam Ali Shrine
- Parent: Muhammad-Husayn Shirazi (father)
- Relatives: Bagher Shirazi (brother); Mirza Shirazi (great grandfather); Mirza Mahdi Shirazi (second cousin, once removed); Mohammed Ridha Sistani (first cousin, once removed)
- Website: Official Website

Religious life
- Religion: Islam
- Jurisprudence: Twelver Shia Islam

Muslim leader
- Based in: Tehran, Iran

Ayatollah Sayyid Radhi Husayni Shirazi (Persian: رضى حسينى شيرازى; Arabic: رضي الحسيني الشيرازي; 29 March 1927 – 1 December 2021), also known as Razi Shirazi, was an Iranian Shia who was a jurist, philosopher and theologian. He was the great-grandson of the renowned Shia jurist, Mirza Shirazi, the pioneer of the Tobacco protest. He was the Imam of the Shifa mosque in Yousefabad.

== Early life and education ==
Shirazi was born in Najaf, Iraq. He hailed from the prominent religious Shirazi family. His father was Sayyid Muhammad-Husayn Shirazi (d. 1955), the son of grand Ayatollah Mirza Ali Agha Shirazi (d. 1936). His mother was the daughter of Sheikh Muhammad-Kadhim Shirazi (d. 1948). Shirazi is the eldest of eight siblings, four brothers and three sisters. His brother Mostafa is a doctor of agricultural sciences, living in Oregon. His brother Bagher is a doctor in architecture and specialises in Islamic architecture.

Shirazi began his religious education at a young age in Najaf, studying under his grandfather Sheikh Muhammad-Kadhim Shirazi, Sayyid Abu al-Qasim Khoei, Sheikh Husayn al-Hilli and Sheikh Baqir Zanjani. He then immigrated to Iran, and studied under Abul Hasan Sharani, Muhammad Taqi Amoli, Fazel Tooni, Mirza Ahmad Ashtiani, Shekh Mojtaba Lankarani, Sayyid Abu al-Hasan Rafiee, and Mirza Mehdi Elahi Qomshehee.

He gained ijtihad in 1953, being awarded permits by Sayyid Jamal al-Din Golpayegani, Sayyid Abd al-Hadi Shirazi, Mirza Abu al-Hasan Rafiee, and Sheikh Muhammad-Husayn Kashif Ghitaa'.

== Religious career ==
Shirazi has taught in many different places, such as the Marvi School, the Sepahsalar School (University of Motahhari), and the University of Tehran as a Theology faculty member. Shirazi was the representative of grand Ayatollah Hossein Borujerdi in the international congress of al-Aqsa Mosque. He was the Imam of the Shifa mosque in Yousefabad in Tehran. As part of his Islamic missionary work, Shirazi has converted just over 500 people into the Muslim faith.

=== Works ===
Shirazi has written many works on the subjects of philosophy, theology and jurisprudence.

Some of his works include:

- Explaining the Poems of Wisdom (2 volumes, Sharhe Manzoumeh)
- Al Esfar An Al-Asfar (2 volumes),
- Criticism and Planning of Ideas, Zolale Hekmat (Commentary of Quran),
- Zolale Hekmat (ethics).

== Death ==
Shirazi died in Tehran on Wednesday, December 1, 2021, aged 94. He was buried in the Imam Ali Shrine in Najaf.

== See also ==
- Islamic philosophy
- Mirza Shirazi
- Taqi Tabatabaei Qomi
