= Abd al-Hadi al-Shirazi =

Iraqi-Iranian Grand Ayatollah (1888-1962)

Grand Ayatollah Sayyid Abd al-Hadi Shirazi
- السيد عبد الهادي الحسيني الشيرازي
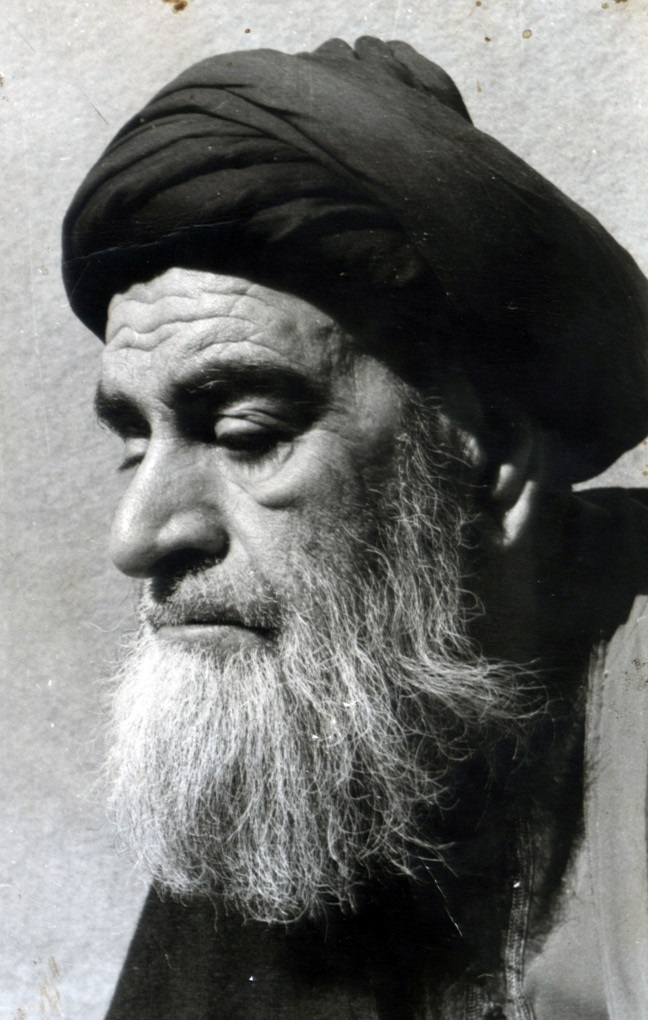

Personal life
- Born: 1882 Samarra, Ottoman Iraq
- Died: 13 July 1962 (aged 79–80) Najaf, Republic of Iraq
- Resting place: Imam Ali Shrine
- Children: Musa; Muhammad-Ali; Muhammad-Ibrahim
- Parent: Ismail Shirazi (father)
- Relatives: Mirza Shirazi (first cousin, once removed & uncle-in-law); Mirza Mahdi Shirazi (second cousin, once removed & brother-in-law)

Religious life
- Religion: Islam
- Jurisprudence: Twelver Shia Islam

Muslim leader
- Based in: Najaf, Iraq

Grand Ayatollah Mirza Abd al-Hadi Husayni Shirazi (Arabic: عبد الهادي الحسيني الشيرازي; 1882 – 13 July 1962) was a Shia marja' and poet. After the death of Abu al-Hasan Esfehani, Shirazi was considered to be one of the highest ranking scholars in Iraq, along with Muhsin al-Hakim (possibly higher ranking than al-Hakim) and some less popular jurists like Muhammad-Husayn Kashif Ghitaa, Mahmoud Shahroudi, and Muhammad-Ridha Al Yasin. His brother-in-law, Mirza Mahdi Shirazi was the leading scholar in Karbala.

He was one of the leading scholars that issued an anti-communist fatwa during the rise of the "red tide" in Iraq under Abd al-Karim Qasim.

== Early life and education ==
=== Early life ===
He was born in 1888, in the city of Samarra to the prominent religious Shirazi family. His father was Mirza Ismail Shirazi, a mujtahid and poet, who fell ill and died a few months after his sons birth. Mirza Shirazi, the pioneer of the Tobacco Movement was married to his paternal aunt. Mirza Mahdi Shirazi was his brother-in-law.

=== Education ===
He grew up and studied in Samarra, under his cousin Sayyed Agha Ali Shirazi (son of Mirza Shirazi; d. 1936) and his wife's maternal uncle Mirza Muhammad-Taqi Shirazi. He then moved to Najaf in 1908, to complete his religious education. He studied under greats such as Sheikh Fathallah Isfahani, Sheikh Muhammad-Kadhim Khorasani, Sheikh Muhammad-Hussain Naini and Sheikh Dhiya' al-Din Iraqi. He then returned to Samarra in 1912, to study again under his Agha Ali and Mirza Taqi. He then left Samarra for Karbala with Mirza Taqi, who was preparing for the Iraqi revolt. He remained in Karbala for a while, then returned to Najaf in 1918, resuming his classes with Sheikh Isfahani.

Eventually, he began teaching in his home, until his voice rendered inaudible due to the number of people present in his class, so he relocated to the al-Turuk Mosque in the al-Huwaysh area. By 1935, he was considered one of the leading scholars and teachers of Najaf.

== Works ==
=== Books ===
- Dar al-Salam Fi Ahkam al-Salam Fi Shari' al-Islam (Home of Peace in the Laws of Peace in Islamic Law)
- Ijtima' al-Amur wal-Nahi (Joining of Doing and Forbidding)
- Manasik al-Hajj (Hajj laws)
- Diwan (Poetry collection)
- Wasilat al-Najat (Means of Salvation)
- Thakhirat al-Ibad (The Worshippers' Provisions)

=== Poetry ===
Shirazi grew up in a household that was constantly visited by grand poets like Sayyid Haidar al-Hilli and Sayyid Jafar Tabatabaei, who were contemporaries of his father, and so became a capable poet, writing numerous poems in praise of the Ahl al-Bayt, in Arabic and Persian.

One of his most notable poems is about Abu Talib:

أبو طالب حامي الحقيقة سيّد
تزان به البطحاء في البر والبحر
أبو طالب والخيل والليل واللوا
له شهدت في ملتقى الحرب بالنصر
أبو الأوصياء الغر عمّ محمّد
تضوع به الأحساب عن طيب النجر

Translation:

Abu Talib, protector of the truth; the master,
Equal to the Bathaa on land and sea.
Abu Talib, the horses, the night, and the banner,
Witnessed him victorious in war.
The father of the commander, uncle of Muhammad,
Flourishes with a lineage of purity.

== Personal life ==
Shirazi was married to Um Moosa, the daughter of his second cousin, once removed, Mirza Habiballah Shirazi. He had five daughters and three sons (Musa, Muhammad-Ali and Muhammad-Ibrahim). All of his sons were clerics. His son Musa died in Tehran in 1980. Muhammad-Ali died in Najaf in 2003. Muhammad-Ibrahim was abducted and executed by the Baathist regime, along with a group of scholars from Najaf and Karbala, in 1991.

He lost his eyesight in 1949 due to a disease that he attempted to treat in Tehran, but was unsuccessful.

== Death ==
Shirazi caught a fever and died on Friday, 13 July 1962, in Kufa. He was buried in the Imam Ali shrine. Ayatollah Sayyid Abu al-Qasim Khoei led his funeral prayers.
