= Allameh Sayyed Abul Hasan Rafiee Qazvini =

Ayatollah Allameh Sayyed Abul Hasan Rafiee Qazvini

Personal life
- Born: Qazvin; 1890 Qazvin, Iran
- Died: 1975 (aged 84–85) Qom, Iran
- Resting place: Fatima Masumeh Shrine, Qom
- Main interest(s): Islamic philosophy, jurisprudence

Religious life
- Religion: Islam

Muslim leader
- Disciple of: Hajj Molla Ali Taromi. Ayatollah molla Ali Akbar Takestani, Sheykh Abdun Nabi nouri, Mirza masih Taleqani, Ayatollah Sayyed Muhammed Tonekaboni, Ayatollah sheikh Muhammad Reza Nouri, Mirza Hasan Kermanshahi, Hajj Fazel Tehrani shemirani, Mirza Mahmoud Qommi, Aqa Mirza Ebrahim Zanjani, Aqa sheikh Ali Rashti, Sheykh Abul Karim Haeri Yazdi

Sayyed Abul Hasan Rafiee Qazvini (1890–1975) was an Iranian Islamic philosopher, and jurist.

== Early life ==
Sayyed Abul Hasan Rafiee Qazvini was born in 1890 in Qazvin Province, Iran. His family were the relatives of Molla Khalil Qazvini. His father Abul Hasan Ibn Khalil Al Hosseini was also a jurist. The family name Rafiee was given to him from his grandfather, Ayatollah Mirza Rafiee.

As a child, Qazvini learned literature and Arabic. He studied at the school of Salehiyyah of Qazvin. Later, he taught at the school of Sadr. He was the imam of the Sultani Mosque for some years.

=== Teachers ===
Qazvini studied under many grand teachers, including Hajj Molla Ali Taromi. Ayatllah Molla Ali Akbar Takestani, Sheykh Abdun Nabi Nouri, Mirza Masih Taleqani, Ayatollah Sayyed Muhammed Tonekaboni, Ayatollah Sheikh Muhammad Reza Nouri, Mirza Hasan Kermanshahi, Hajj Fazel Tehrani Shemirani, Mirza Mahmoud Qommi, Aqa Mirza Ebrahim Zanjani, Aqa Sheikh Ali Rashti, and Sheykh Abul Karim Haeri Yazdi.

== Career ==
During his career, Qazvini studied exact sciences and philosophy. He strove for simplicity and taught subjects such as the Asfar simply. He was concerned with philosophical and theological subjects for 60 years. Both the Grand Ayatollah Sayyed Abul Hasan Esfahani and Sheykh Muhammad reza Masjed Shahi Esfahani gave Qazvini permission regarding the Ijtihad and narrations.

=== Pupils ===
Qazvini's pupils included Ayatollah Sayyed Razi Shirazi, Sheykh Muhyy Addin Anvari, Shahcherghi, Hajj Mostafa Masjed Jameei, Sheykh Muhammad Ali Zahabi Shirazi Hakim, and Ayatollah Hasan Zadeh Amoli.

=== Works ===
Qazvini wrote close to 20 books on diverse subjects. Some of them include Explanation of Duaye Sahar, The Treatise of Meraj, Treatise on Rajat, An Article of Asfar Arbah, An Article About the Substantive Motion, Treatise on Monism, and An Article on Copula.

== Family ==
Qazvini had 14 children: four daughters and ten sons.

== Death ==
Qazvini died in 1975 at the age of 85. He is buried in the Fatima Masumeh Shrine in Qom.
