= Reza Esfahani =

Iranian politician (1935-2002)

Member of the Parliament of Iran
- In office 28 May 1980 – 28 May 1984
- Constituency: Varamin

Personal details
- Born: 1935 Tehran, Iran
- Died: 2002

Reza Esfahani (Persian: رضا اصفهانی) was an Iranian politician who was a deputy to the agriculture ministry during Interim Government of Iran, and later served as a parliamentarian for a term.

Before Iranian Revolution, he studied Islamic jurisprudence and was a preacher at Hosseinieh Ershad. Described as a "radical" Muslim, he was a harsh critic of capitalism and feudalism. According to Keith S. MacLachlan, he was influenced by left-wing politics.

== Activities in agriculture ministry ==
Esfahani offered direct public access to his office, in other words, "simply sat on the floor of his office, opened the door, and handled the problems and grievances of the barefoot peasants". He proposed a land reform program, eponymously known as "Esfahani's Land-reform", that brought private ownership of land under question. The Revolutionary Council introduced it in April 1980, which "limited land ownership by small-scale farmers to three times the acreage sufficient to support a peasant family" and transferred mechanized farms to cooperative farms. Landowners strongly stood against the plan and accused Esfahani of being a communist and conservative pro-land ulema questioned Esfahani's understanding of Islam. Eventually Ruhollah Khomeini ordered the land reform to be stopped.
