= Al-Urwah al-Wuthqa (book) =

Urwa al-Wuthqa (Arabic: العروة الوثقي) is a famous compilation of questions on fiqh or Islamic jurisprudence by Mohammed Kazem Yazdi. It is considered such a prominent work that many jurists have posed their opinions about the ideas of the book in the form of annotations and commentaries and glosses.

This compilation's author is known as the Sahib-Urwa (the owner of Urwa). The mentioned book includes diverse chapters of Fiqh, and expresses (Islamic) legal rulings/problems.

On the whole, Urwa al-Wuthqa consists of 3260 problems in three volumes; its first volume includes the matters of Ijtihad and Taqlid, the books of: al-Taharah, al-Salah, al-Sawm, al-E'tekaf, al-Zakat, al-Khoms, al-Haj, al-Ijarah, al-Mudharebah, al-Mazare'ah, al-Musaqat, al-Dhiman, al-Hawalah, al-Nikah and al-Wasiah.

The second volume of that consists of: the matters of hypocrisy Hormah (being haram), Iddah matters and its rulings; the book of al-Hibah, the book of al-Waqf; and a small Risalah in Sadaqah Bel-Ma'ni al-Khasah.

The third volume of the book of Urwa al-Wuthqa is included the book of al-Qadha, which has been paid heed by Marjas. Moreover, Sheikh Abbas Qomi has translated Yazdi's Urwa al-Wuthqa into Persian; and another scholar has completed it, and has been published as "Qayatul-Qaswa Fi Tarjomah Urwa-al-Wuthqa"

== See also ==
- List of Shia books
- Nahj al-Balagha
- Ja'fari jurisprudence
- The Four Books
- Umdat al-Talib
