= Abdoldjavad Falaturi =

Abdoldjavad Falaturi (Persian: عبدالجواد فلاطوری; 1926–1996) was a German scholar of Iranian origin.

== Education ==
He attended a German-Persian high school in his hometown of Isfahan and took private lessons in Arabic literature and Islamic studies. He carried on his education at Mahad and Tehran. Later, he attended the University of Tehran's Faculty of Theology, where he graduated with a bachelor of arts in philosophy in 1333/1954. While in Germany, Falaturi studied a variety of courses, including philosophy, psychology, comparative religion, Greek, and Latin; he earned his PhD from the University of Bonn in 1962.

== Career ==
He has also written several other official publications (together with Udo Tworuschka) for education in Germany on Islamic theology (initially "Der Islam im Unterricht. Beiträge zur interkulturellen Erziehung in Europa", in: Beilage zu den Studien zur Internationalen Schulbuchforschung, Braunschweig : Georg-Eckert-Institut, 1992.)

From 1974 through 1996, he was a professor of Islamic philosophy, theology, and law at the University of Cologne. He played a significant role in developing the Shiite collection in the University of Cologne's Oriental Department beginning in 1965.

He co-established the Islamic Academy for Research into the Interrelationships with Western Intellectual History and Culture in Cologne; formed in 1978) and was a founding member of the Central Council of Muslims in Germany (created in 1986). Falaturi was one of the few Persian religious intellectuals in close contact with Azhar University administrators after the Islamic Revolution of 1979, and he was then appointed to their Islamic council, the Majles al-al le-aeon al-lam al-eslm.

He focussed on the confusion between cultural habits and religious rules. Among others, he writes that it is incorrect to state that the chador is a religious obligation.

== Bibliography/Works ==
- Falaturi, Abdoldjavad (1995). Islam in Religious Education Textbooks in Europe. Islamic Scientific Community.
- Falaturi, Abdoldjavad (1987). Three Ways to One God: The Faith Experience in Judaism, Christianity, and Islam. Crossroad Publishing Company. ISBN 978-0-824-50818-0. Co-authored with Elizabeth Petuchowski and Jakob Josef Petuchowski
- Falaturi, Abdoldjavad; Schimmel, Annemarie (1979). We believe in one God. ISBN 978-0-860-12078-0.
- Elementary Persian Grammar, 1967
- Falaturi, Abdoldjavad (1968). "Die schiitischen Derwischorden Persiens, erster Teil: Die Affiliationen, (Abhandlungen für die Kunde des Morgenlandes XXXVI, 1) Richard Gramlich". Zeitschrift der Deutschen Morgenländischen Gesellschaft. 118 (2): 437–440. ISSN 0341-0137. JSTOR 43370101.
- An unpublished treatise of Miskawaih on Justice or Risāla fī Māhiyat al-'adl li Miskawaih., 1968 (German and English Edition) ISSN 0021-1818
- Islam in the classroom: Contributions to intercultural education in Europe. German Edition, 1991 (Co-authored with Udo Tworuschka)
- History of Religion in Public (Cologne publications on the history of religion; Vol. 1). German Edition
- Muslim thoughts for Teachers and textbooks authors
- Qişşat al-īmān baina al-falsafa wa al-'ilm wa al-qur'ān., 1965 (German edition)
- Zur Interpretation der Kantischen Ethik im Lichte der Achtung. Mit einem Anhang: Vorarbeit zu Studien zu einem allgemeinen Kantwörterbuch / Abdoldjavad Falaturi, 1965 (Thesis (doctoral)--Rheinische Friedrich-Wilhelms-Universität Bonn, 1926.)
- Falaturi, Abdoldjavad (1992). Guide to the Presentation of Islam in School Textbooks (CSIC Papers: Europe.). Centre for the Study of Islam & Christian-Muslim Relations. p. 65. ASIN 0946931011.
- Analysis of the Catholic religion books on the subject of Islam (Islam in the school books of the Federal Republic of Germany), 1988 (Co-Author) German Edition
- Falaturi, Abdoldjavad (1988). Catalogue of the Shi'Ite Collection in the Oriental Department of the University of Cologne. p. 517. ISBN 978-3-598-10761-0.
- Beitrage zu islamischem Rechtsdenken, 2006 doi:10.2307/1570994
- Falaturi, Abdoldjavad (2014). Interreligiöse Toleranz: Von der Notwendigkeit des christlich-islamischen Dialogs. p. 154. ISBN 978-0671610036. (German Edition), (Contributing author)
- Abdoldjavad, Falaturi (2017). Handbuch Theologie Der Religionen: Texte Zur Religiosen Vielfalt Und Zum Interreligiosen Dialog. ISBN 978-3-451-37695-5.
- Die Umdeutung der griechischen Philosophie durch das islamische Denken (German Edition), 2018. ISBN 978-3-826-05974-2
