= Mohammed Kazem Yazdi =

Iraqi Shia Islamic scholar (1831–1919)

Grand Ayatollah Mohammad Kazem Tabatabei Yazdi
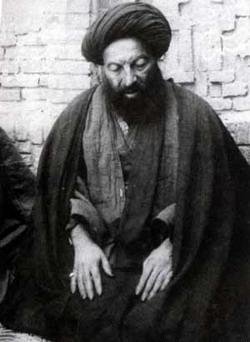
- Grand Ayatollah Muhammad Kazem Yazdi

Personal life
- Born: 1831 Yazd, Iran
- Died: 1919 (aged 87–88) Najaf, Iraq
- Resting place: Najaf, Imam Ali Mosque
- Region: Twelver Shia
- Main interest(s): Islamic philosophy, Usul al-fiqh
- Notable work: Urwa al-Wuthqa
- Other names: Sayyid Mohammad Kazem Tabatabei Yazdi; Mohammad Kazem Tabatabaei; Ahmad Tabatabaei

Religious life
- Religion: Islam

Muslim leader
- Influenced: Mahdi Hussaini Shirazi, Aqa Bozorg Tehrani

Mohammed Kazem Tabataba'i Yazdi (Persian: محمد کاظم یزدی; 1831–1919) was a Twelver Shia Marja' based in Najaf, most famous for compiling a collection of religious rulings, al-Urwa al-wuthqa.

== Constitutional Revolution ==
Yazdi initially chose to stay out of politics for the most part, very rarely taking any direct action or involvement. However when it came to light that the Constitutional revolution was trying to replace traditional Islamic governance he issued a fatwa against it, and disagreed greatly with Akhund Khorasani. He openly supported Islamiyya Company and called for jihad against the British, Italians and Russians.https://en.wikishia.net/view/Al-Sayyid_Muhammad_Kazim_al-Yazdi

== Works ==
One of his important books is Urwa al-Wuthqa (Orwatul Wosgha). This book which is in Arabic is to a collection of legal ruling issued in 1919.

== See also ==
- Iranian Constitutional Revolution
- Muhammad Kazim Khurasani
- Mirza Husayn Tehrani
- Abdullah Mazandarani
- Muhammad Husayn Na'ini
- Mirza Ali Aqa Tabrizi
- Fazlullah Nouri
- Urwatul Wuthqa

== Bibliography ==
- Farzaneh, Mateo Mohammad (March 2015). Iranian Constitutional Revolution and the Clerical Leadership of Khurasani. Syracuse, NY: Syracuse University Press. ISBN 978-0-8156-3388-4. OCLC 931494838.
- Hermann, Denis (1 May 2013). "Akhund Khurasani and the Iranian Constitutional Movement". Middle Eastern Studies. 49 (3): 430–453. doi:10.1080/00263206.2013.783828. ISSN 0026-3206. JSTOR 23471080. S2CID 143672216.
- The Turban for the Crown: The Islamic Revolution in Iran By Said Amir Arjomand
- Mottahedeh, Roy, The Mantle of the Prophet : Religion and Politics in Iran, One World, Oxford, 1985, 2000
