= Mirza Mahdi al-Shirazi =

Iranian-Iraqi Shia marja (1887–1961)

Grand Ayatollah Mirza Mahdi al-Shirazi
- الميرزا مهدی الحسيني الشيرازي
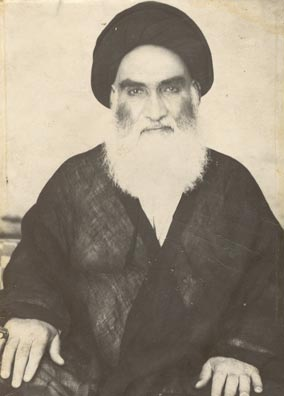

Personal life
- Born: 8 May 1887 Karbala, Baghdad Vilayet, Ottoman Empire
- Died: 14 February 1961 (aged 73) Karbala, Republic of Iraq
- Resting place: Imam Husayn Shrine
- Children: Muhammad; Hassan; Sadiq; Mujtaba
- Parent: Habiballah Shirazi (father)
- Relatives: Mirza Shirazi (great uncle); Mirza Taqi Shirazi (maternal uncle); Abd al-Hadi Shirazi (second cousin, once removed & brother-in-law); Razi Shirazi (second cousin, once removed); Mohammed Ridha Shirazi (grandson); Hussein Shirazi (grandson); Mohammad Taqi Modarresi (grandson); Hadi Modarresi (grandson); Ali Akbar Modarresi (grandson)

Religious life
- Religion: Islam
- Jurisprudence: Twelver Shia Islam

Muslim leader
- Based in: Karbala, Iraq
- Period in office: 1949–1961
- Predecessor: Hossein Tabatabaei Qomi
- Successor: Muhsin al-Hakim (leadership centralized in Najaf)

Grand Ayatollah Mirza Mahdi al-Husayni al-Shirazi (Arabic: مهدي الحسيني الشيرازي; 9 May 1887 – 14 February 1961), also known as Mirza Mahdi al-Shirazi, was an Iraqi Shia marja. After the death of Abu al-Hasan Esfehani and Hossein Tabatabaei Qomi, Mirza Mahdi was considered to be the highest ranking cleric in Karbala, and one of the highest in Iraq, along with Muhsin al-Hakim and his second cousin once removed, Abd al-Hadi Shirazi in Najaf.

Mirza Mahdi was the Imam of the Imam Husayn Shrine.

== Biography ==
=== Early life ===
He was born in the city of Karbala to the prominent religious Shirazi family. His father was Mirza Habibullah Shirazi, and his mother was Radhiya Golshan-Shirazi (daughter of Muhib Ali Golshan-Shirazi). Mirza Mahdi is the fourth of eight children. His eldest brother, Muhammd-Sadiq, died young. The remaining two of his brothers were also clerics; his older brother, Abdullah Shirazi (grandfather of Ali Sistani's wife; also known as Tawasuli), and younger brother, Jafar Shirazi. His elder sister, Um Moosa, was married to his cousin, senior cleric, Abd al-Hadi Shirazi.

Mirza Mahdi began his religious education at a very early age, carrying out his introductory studies in Karbala, under his brother, Abdullah Tawasuli, Sayyid Husayn Khayr al-Din and Sayyid Muhammad-Hassan Agha Mir Qazwini. After his father, Mirza Habibullah died in 1902, he moved to Najaf, to study under the two greats, Akhund Khurasani and Muhammad-Kadhim Yazdi. He then travelled to Samarra with his family, to study in its seminary - under his maternal uncle, Mirza Muhammad-Taqi Shirazi and Hasan al-Sadr - which the former was managing at the time.

During the siege of Kut, Mirza Mahdi travelled to Kadhimiya, with his uncle Mirza Taqi, who feared that Samarra could end up like Kut, and that way many from the religious sphere would die. They remained in Kadhimiya for approximately a year and a half, living a life of dire poverty, until they returned to Karbala, where Mirza Taqi, was preparing to lead the Iraqi revolt against the British administration. He remained in Karbala, and played an active supporting role with his uncle in the Iraqi revolt, until his uncle was poisoned in 1920.

After the death of his uncle, he moved back to Najaf, to resume his religious education, and studied under his first cousin once removed, Mirza Ali Agha Shirazi, as well as Muhaqiq Naini and Muhaqiq Iraqi.

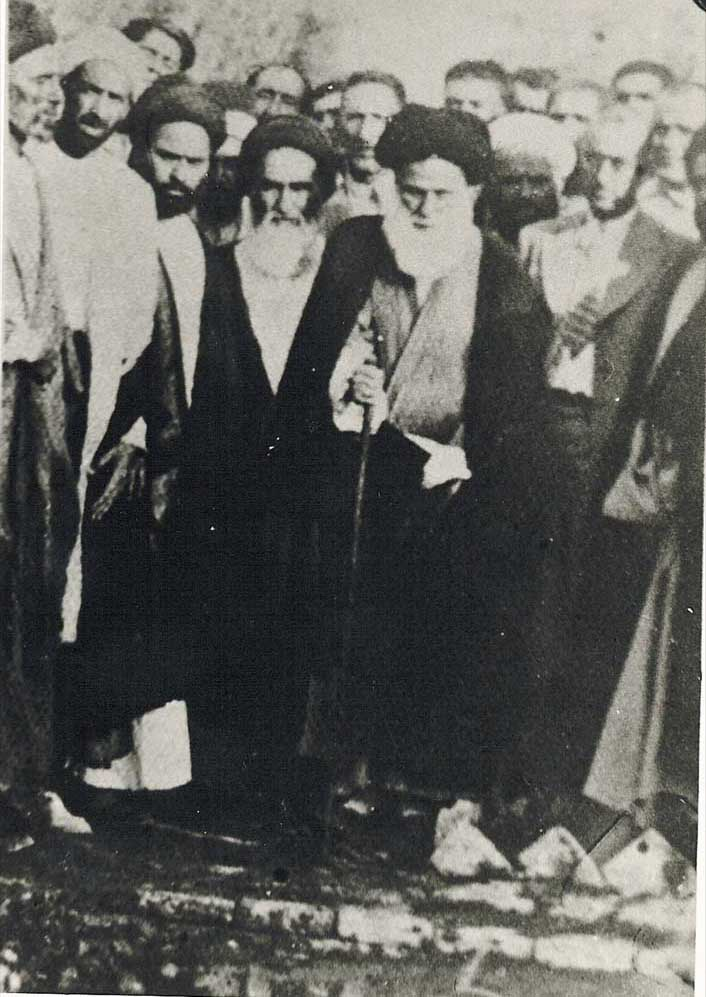
Mirza Mahdi (centre left) with his teacher Hossein Qomi (centre right)

=== Return to Karbala ===
In 1935, senior cleric Hossein Tabatabaei Qomi was exiled from Iran, by Muhammed Reza Shah. So Qomi emigrated to Karbala, and sent a request for Mirza Mahdi to return to Karbala, so that he may join him in his quest to revive its seminary, to which Mirza Mahdi accepted and returned to his birthplace. After the death of Qomi in 1947, Mirza Mahdi became the head of the seminary of Karbala, and its most senior jurist. This was also solidified further, with the death of notable cleric, Muhammad-Hadi Khurasani in 1949.

=== Karbala Seminary Term ===
The hawza of Karbala grew immensely under Mirza Mahdi's term as head, as he innovated new methods to teach religious studies, which attracted many youth to join the seminary. He taught many that later became influential scholars like Sheikh Muhammad Karbassi, Sayyid Muhammad-Sadiq Qazwini, Sheikh Muhammad Shahroudi, ِSayyid Abdullah Khoei, Sayyid Ahmed Fali and Sheikh Jafar Rashti. Under his term, many different festivals were innovated, including the recitation of the renowned maqtal, that was recited in the shrine of Imam Husayn for the first time, by his student, Sheikh Abd al-Zahra al-Ka'bi, in Muharram 1379 (1959 AD).

=== Iraqi citizenship protest ===
Mirza Mahdi was active in the Iranian community of Karbala (whether in the seminary or in social circles). This was in 1958, a time when the Iranian community was being politically isolated, in the face of an Iraqi government that was raising the banner of Arab nationalism. Due to this situation, Mirza Mahdi sent a letter to the governor of Karbala, Fuad Arif, who was of Kurdish descent, objecting the treatment of the Iranians. This angered Fuad, and so he responded by accusing Mirza Mahdi of being Iranian himself, and that he had no right to interfere with Iraqi matters. Mirza Mahdi retorted, but this time with an angry tone, reminding Fuad, that it was us that ignited the 1920 revolt, and ended up forcing the British to grant Iraq more autonomy than they had previously planned to. He also told him that if he did not want to work in accordance to their demands, then he can leave the city.

After this, Mirza Mahdi founded a new philosophy, which was that he was not going to hold an Iraqi citizenship, deeming it as an imperialistic innovation, invented to crush the ranks of the Muslims. He also claimed that it violated the liberty of man and the sharia, and would create mental barriers within the minds of people. He also explained, that the citizenship was a new innovation of dominance by the Abd-Al Karim Qasim's government.

=== Stand against communism ===
After the 14 July coup, Abd al-Karim Qasim allowed communism to flourish in his new republic. Within six months, bands of pro-communist protestors started attacking the homes of religious clerics and nationalists. It was so bad, it is reported that a cleric would feel estranged in some locations in a city like Najaf.

One time, a protest was formed in Karbala, with some of the leaders of the city's communist movement. They had a list of fifty two names (this included Mirza Mahdi's son Muhammad), of the people they planned to attack their homes, for the reason that they 'stood against communism and the "red tide"'.

This is when the senior jurists of the time decided to take a stand to counter this wave of terror. A meeting was held consisting of Mirza Mahdi, Muhsin al-Hakim and Abu al-Qasim Khoei in Mirza Mahdi's home in Karbala. The result was that they were going to issue religious fatwas branding the Communist party as illegitimate. They also began to coordinate activities to counter their alleged corrupt ideology. These measures were considered to be the beginning of the end of communism in Iraq.

Mirza Mahdi issued several fatwa's condemning adherence to the Communist party, going as far as stating that a true Muslim could not buy meat from a communist butcher.

== Personal life ==
Mirza Mahdi was married to his second cousin's daughter, Halima Shirazi with whom he had ten children; four sons (Muhammad, Hassan, Sadiq, Mujtaba) and six daughters. One of his daughters was married to Muhammad-Kadhim Modarresi, and another was married to Muhammad-Kadhim Qazwini.

== Works ==
=== Books ===
Mirza Mahdi authored a large number of books, which includes some of his most important ones:

- Sharh al-Urwat al-Wuthqa (Dissecting The Firmest Bond)
- Thakhirat al-Ibad (The Worshippers' Provisions)
- Manasek al-Haj (Hajj Rituals)
- Kashkool Fi Mukhtalaf al-'Uloom (An Assortment In Different Sciences)

=== Poetry ===
Mirza Mahdi also wrote poetry in praise of the Ahlulbayt. His most known poem was written on the auspicious birth anniversary of Fatima, which begins with:

درّة أشرقت بأبهى سناها
فتلألأ الورى فيا بُشراها
لمع الكون من سنا نور قدس
بسنا ناره أضاء طواها

Translation:

A pearl has risen with prestigious light,
The world has been illuminated, glad tidings.
The universe shines from the divine light,
With His light, he illuminated her valley.

== Death ==
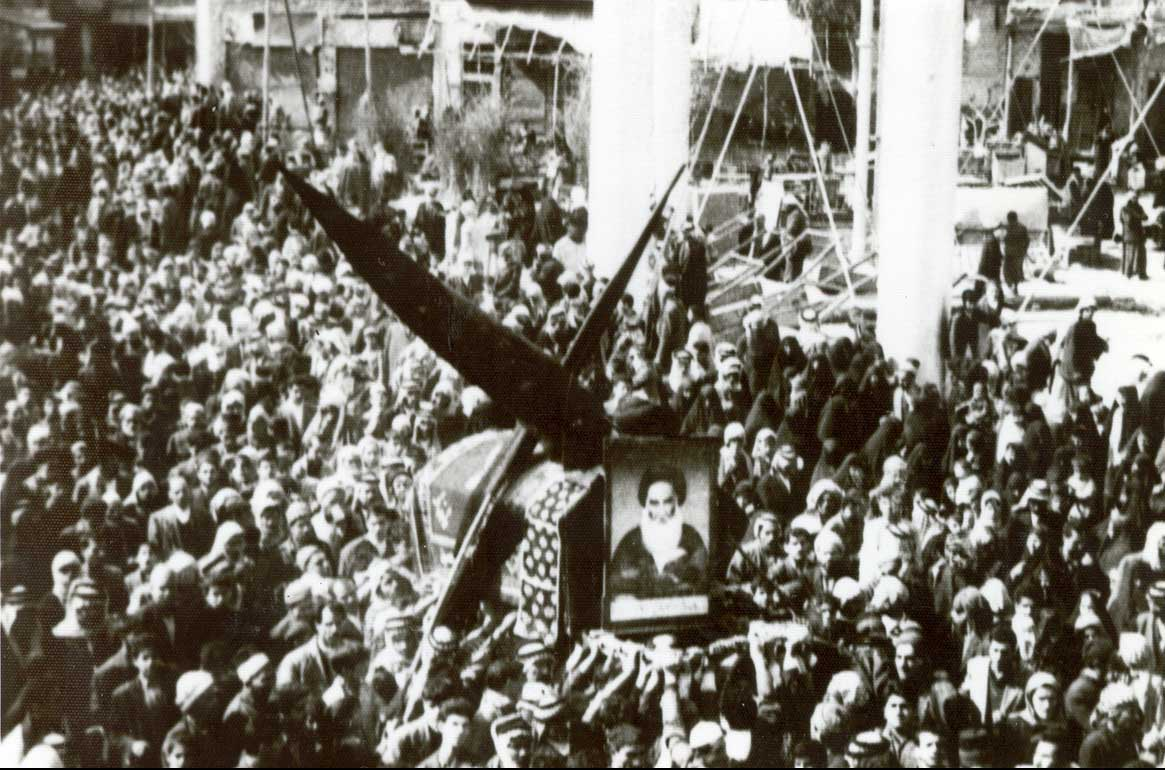
Funeral of Mirza Mahdi, Karbala

Mirza Mahdi died in the evening of Tuesday, 14 February 1961, just as we was preparing for Maghrib prayer. During the bathing of his corpse on the following day, there was a partial solar eclipse that took place, with 67% obscurity that darkened the city of Karbala for just under an hour, as witnessed by the people of the city, who rushed to pray the Ayat prayer, before resuming with the funeral. He was buried in the south eastern side of the Imam Husayn Shrine.

=== Reactions ===
The Shia world was struck upon Mirza Mahdi's death. It is reported that Hossein Borujerdi, who was in Qom, cried for a few minutes over the news of Mirza Mahdi's demise.
