= Mirza Taqi al-Shirazi =

Iraqi jurist

Grand Ayatollah Sheikh Mirza Mohammad Taqi Shirazi
- ميرزا محمدتقی شیرازی
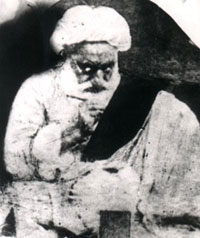

Personal life
- Born: 1840 Shiraz, Qajar Iran
- Died: 28 August 1920 (aged 79–80) Karbala, Mandatory Iraq
- Resting place: Imam Husayn Shrine
- Children: Muhammad Riza; Abdul Hussein; Muhammad Hasan
- Parent: Muhib Ali Shirazi (father)
- Relatives: Mirza Mahdi al-Shirazi (nephew)

Religious life
- Religion: Islam
- Jurisprudence: Twelver Shia Islam

Muslim leader
- Based in: Samarra, Iraq
- Period in office: 1895–1916
- Predecessor: Mirza Shirazi
- Successor: Samarra seminary was abandoned

Grand Ayatollah Sheikh Mohammad Taqi Golshan Shirazi Ha'eri (Persian: محمدتقی گلشن شیرازی هائری; Arabic: الميرزا محمد تقي الشيرازي الحائري), also known as al-Mirza al-Thani (transl. the second Mirza; the first being Mirza Shirazi), was an Iranian-Iraqi senior jurist and political leader. He led the Iraqi revolt of 1920.

== Early life and education ==
Shirazi was born in 1840, to Mirza Muhib Ali Golshan Shirazi. His uncle was Mirza Habibullah Shirazi, a famous Iranian poet.

He migrated to Karbala in 1854, and began his religious studies there, under scholars such as Sheikh Zayn al-Abideen al-Mazandarani, Sayyid Ali Taqi al-Tabatabaei, and Sheikh Fadhil al-Ardakani. He was granted ijazas by Mirza Husayn al-Khalili, Sheikh Husayn bin Taqi al-Nuri, Sheikh Abbas al-Tehrani, and Mirza Hasan Khan al-Shirazi. He then moved to Samarra along with his mentor and predecessor, Mirza Shirazi, to establish the city, as the new Shi'ite intellectual loci. In Samarra, Shirazi spent his time teaching and delivering lectures at the seminary. After the demise of his teacher, Shirazi took the reins of the seminary in Samarra.

He remained in Samarra until 1916, when the situation began to deteriorate, and Shirazi feared that Samarra was going to end up like Kut, during its siege, so he travelled to Kadhimiya. He remained there for just under two years, until he finally settled in Karbala.

== Work ==
Shirazi had a number of publications, and often used Gulshan as his pen name:

- Hashiya 'Ala al-Makasib. A commentary on Murtadha al-Ansari's al-Makasib.
- Sharh Manthumat Al-Amili Fi al-Ridha'. An exposition on Sadr al-Din al-Amili's Urjuza al-Ridha'ia.
- Divan in the Persian language.
- Risala Fi Salat al-Jum'a
- Risala Fi al-Khilal
- Al-Qasa'ed al-Fakhira Fi Madh al-'Etra al-Tahira. Poetry in praise of the Ahl al-Bayt.

== Death ==
Shirazi died on 28 August 1920, in Karbala at the age of eighty. Sheikh Fatthullah al-Isfahani offered his funeral prayers. He was buried in the southern chamber in the Imam Husayn shrine courtyard.
