= Mohammed Kadhim al-Qazwini =

Iraqi Ayatollah (1930–1994)

Ayatollah Sayyid Muhammad-Kadhim al-Qazwini
- السيد محمد كاظم الموسوي القزويني
- Title: Ayatollah

Personal life
- Born: March 13, 1930 Karbala, Iraq
- Died: November 17, 1994 (aged 64) Qom, Iran
- Resting place: Imam Husayn Shrine
- Children: Muhammad-Ibrahim; Muhammad-Ali; Mustafa; Muhsin; Jafar
- Parent: Muhammad-Ibrahim al-Qazwini (father)
- Relatives: Murtadha al-Qazwini (first cousin, once removed); Mirza Mahdi al-Shirazi (father-in-law); Muhammad al-Shirazi (brother-in-law); Mohammed Kadhim al-Modarresi (brother-in-law)

Religious life
- Religion: Islam
- Denomination: Twelver Shīʿā

Ayatollah Sayyid Muhammad-Kadhim al-Musawi al-Qazwini (Arabic: محمد كاظم الموسوي القزويني; Persian: محمد كاظم موسوى قزوينى; March 13, 1930 – November 17, 1994) was an Iraqi Shia scholar, poet and orator of Iranian descent. He was born in Karbala, Iraq and died in Qom, Iran.

He was a dubbed the 'master of Karbala's orators'. He authored a series of leading books on the biographies of the Ahl al-Bayt called Min al-Mahd Ila al-Lahd (From the Cradle to the Grave).

== Biography ==
=== Early life ===
Al-Qazwini was born to Sayyid Muhammad-Ibrahim al-Qazwini (d. 1941), the son of grand Ayatollah Sayyid Muhammad-Hashim al-Qazwini (d. 1908). His mother died when he was still very young, whilst his father died when he was only 11 years old. He was taken in by his cousin Sayyid Muhammad-Sadiq al-Qazwini, who took care of him and took him to the seminary of Karbala, to pursue a religious education.

=== Education ===
Al-Qazwini took the classes of scholars like Sheikh Jafar al-Rashti, Sayyid Muhammad-Hadi al-Milani, Mirza Mahdi al-Shirazi, Sheikh Yusuf al-Khurasani and Sheikh Muhammad al-Khatib. He studied oratory under his third cousin, Sayyid Muhammad-Salih al-Qazwini (d. 1956; author of notable book, al-Mawʿiḍa al-Ḥasana, a critique of Ali al-Wardi's Wuʿaẓ al-Salaṭīn), and excelled in his public speaking.

=== Emigration ===
Al-Qazwini immigrated twice. The first time was to Kuwait, in 1973, due to the pressures and prosecutions of the Baathist regime, where he practiced his religious activities from Masjid Bin Nakhi. He remained in Kuwait for seven years, and in 1980 travelled to Iran and took residence in Qom, until his death.

== Religious career ==
He founded the Islamic Publishing Association in Karbala, and managed to print and publish large amounts of Islamic books across various Arabian, African and European countries. He also founded the Kitab Wa al-Itra oratory school, which helped produce a generation of religious orators, under his supervision. The school was then closed down by the Baathist regime. He led the prayers in the Husayn shrine after his brother-in-law Muhammad al-Shirazi immigrated to Kuwait in 1970.

== Personal life ==
Al-Qazwini was married to Fatima al-Shirazi, the daughter of grand Ayatollah Mirza Mahdi al-Shirazi. He has five sons, whom are all clerics, and three daughters.

His three sons in law were Sayyid Mehdi al-Kashafi, Sayyid Ali al-Qazwini and Sayyid Kamal al-Din al-Shahidi.

He is the second cousin, twice removed of the renowned Sayyid Ibrahim al-Qazwini (d. 1848), author of al-Dhawabit.

== Death ==
Towards the end of his life, al-Qazwini suffered from a neurological disease that began to take a significant toll on his health, especially his speech, until he died because of it, in the evening of Thursday, November 17, 1994, in Qom. He was buried in Qom under the pulpit of the Hussainiya he frequently recited in.

However, he had declared in his will, that when it were possible, his corpse be transferred to Karbala, to be reburied, as that was his initial wish, but it was impossible due to the Baathis regime. It took the fall of the regime to allow for this to happen, and on May 8, 2011, his family decided to have his corpse exhumed and transferred to Karbala, and was buried in the Imam Husayn shrine. It is reported that when they took his corpse out in Qom, upon inspection, his body was fresh and as if he had just been buried.

== Works ==
Al-Qazwini came to write scores of articles and books in religious beliefs including:

- Sirat al-Rasul al-A'tham (Biography of the Greatest Messenger).
- Min al-Mahd Ila al-Lahd (From the Cradle to the Grave) series:
  - al-Imam Ali (Ali).
  - Fatimah al-Zahra (Fatima).
  - Al-Imam al-Husayn (Husayn).
  - Al-Imam al-Jawad (Muhammad al-Jawad).
  - Al-Imam al-Hadi (Ali al-Hadi).
  - Al-Imam al-Askari (Hasan al-Askari).
  - Zaynab al-Kubra (Zaynab).
- Al-Imam al-Mahdi: Min al-Mahd Ila al-Zuhur (Imam Mehdi: From the Cradle to Reappearance).
- Faji'at al-Taff Aw Maqtal al-Husayn (The Tragedy of Taff or The Murder of Husayn).
- Mawsu'at al-Imam al-Sadiq (Encyclopedia of Imam al-Sadiq).
- al-Islam Wa al-Ta'alim al-Tarbawiya (Islam and Ethical Teachings).
- Sharh Nahj al-Balagha (Explaining Nahj al-Balagha), 5 volumes.

== See also ==
- Mirza Mahdi al-Shirazi
- Murtadha al-Qazwini
- Mohammad Kadhim al-Modarresi
