= Mirza al-Shirazi =

Iranian-Iraqi Shia marja' (1815–1895)

Grand Ayatollah Mujaddid Mirza Muhammad Hassan al-Shirazi
- محمد حسن الحسيني الشيرازي
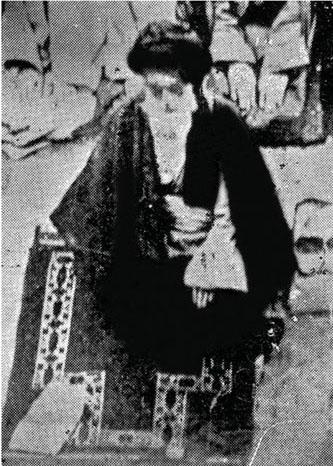
- Title: Grand Ayatollah; Mujaddid

Personal life
- Born: 25 April 1815 Shiraz, Qajar Iran
- Died: 20 February 1895 (aged 79) Samarra, Ottoman Empire (present-day Iraq)
- Resting place: Imam Ali Shrine
- Children: Muhammad; Ali Agha
- Other names: Mirza al-Shirazi al-Mujadid al-Shirazi al-Mirza al-Kabir
- Relatives: Mirza Mahdi Shirazi (grand nephew & grandson-in-law); Razi Shirazi (great grandson); Abd al-Hadi Shirazi (first cousin, once removed)

Religious life
- Religion: Islam
- Denomination: Twelver Shia
- Institute: Najaf Seminary; Samarra Seminary
- Jurisprudence: Ja'fari
- Creed: Usuli

Muslim leader
- Based in: Najaf, Iraq; Samarra, Iraq
- Post: Grand Ayatollah
- Period in office: 1864–1895
- Predecessor: Murtadha Ansari
- Successor: Akhund Khorasani

Abu Muhammad Mu'izuddin Muhammad Hassan al-Hussaini al-Shirazi (Note: (Persian: ابومحمد معزالدین محمدحسن حسينى شيرازی; Arabic: أبو محمد معز الدين محمد حسن الحسيني الشيرازي: 25 April 1815 – 20 February 1895)) (25 April 1815 – 20 February 1895), better known as Mirza al-Shirazi (Note: (Persian: میرزا شيرازی; Arabic: الميرزا الشيرازي)), was an Iranian-Iraqi Shia marja'.

After the death of Murtadha Ansari, he was known to be the supreme Shia leader of his time, and gained fame for his celebrated 1891 verdict against the usage of tobacco in what became known as the Tobacco Protest in the Qajar era.

He was also called al-Mujaddid al-Shirazi (Note: Arabic: المجدد الشيرازي, lit. 'al-Shirazi the Renewer') and al-Mirza al-Kabir (Note: Arabic: الميرزا الكبير, lit. 'al-Mirza the Great') due to his prominent role in the Shia community of Iraq.

== Early life and education ==
Shirazi was born in Shiraz, to the renowned Shirazi family. His father was Mirza Mahmud Shirazi, and his mother was Khanum Musawi. His father died when he was young, and his maternal uncle, Sayyid Husayn Musawi–majd al-ashraf–became his guardian. O He began his religious education at the age of four, and completed his introductory studies by the time he was eight years old. He began his advanced classes in jurisprudence and methodology in the seminary of Shiraz. He studied at the religious seminary in Isfahan beginning in 1832, and was granted ijtihad in 1835.

He then moved to Najaf in 1845, and studied under many senior scholars including Sheikh Muhammad-Ibrahim al-Karbassi, Sayyid Sadr al-Din al-Ameli, Sayyid Hassan al-Mudarris and Sheikh Muhammad-Hassan Najafi. He studied for a short while under Sayyid Ibrahim al-Qazwini, author of al-Dhawabit.

Najafi equipped Shirazi with another certificate of ijtihad and a letter of recommendation to Hossein Khan Sardar, governor of Iran.

Upon the death of Ansari in 1864, Shirazi was nominated the best qualified scholar to succeed him.

== Tobacco Protest ==
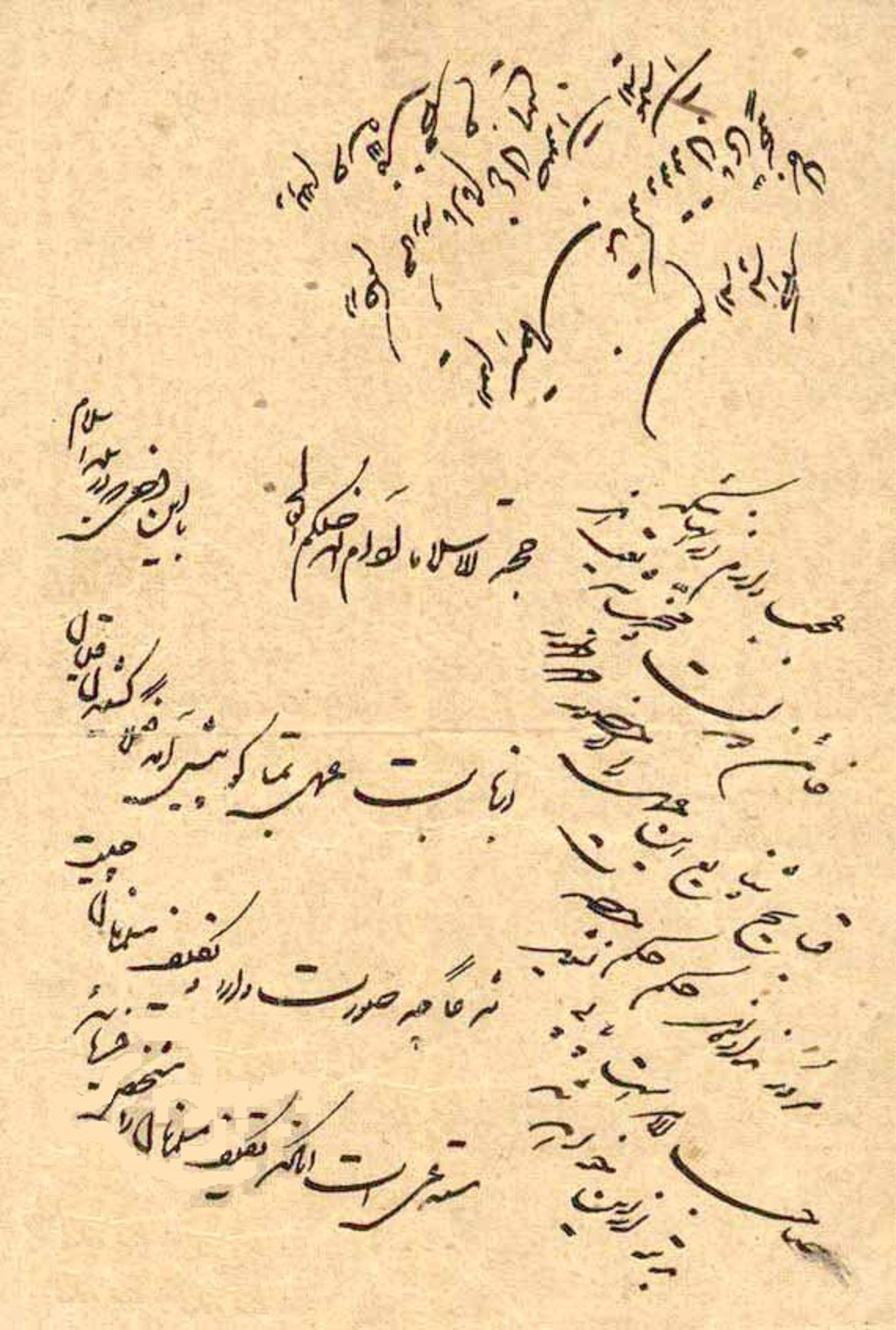
Tobacco Protest verdict issued by Shirazi in 1891

Shirazi was considered the leading marja' of the Shia world, especially in Iraq. This meant that he was very influential, over the Shia community. Two scholars were involved in bringing what was happening in Iran to Shirazi's attention, one of them sent a letter, whilst the other sent one of his students to Samarra, where he was based, to explain matters to Shirazi in person.

The protest started with Shirazi sending a telegram to Naser al-Din Shah, the Qajar king of Iran, on 26 July 1891, protesting the granting of the tobacco monopoly. Shirazi was left with no reply; however, the Shah sent his ambassador in Iraq to Shirazi to try to persuade him to abandon his motive, and that the deal was beneficial to the nation. After another attempt by Shirazi, that was also met with no response, a fatwa began to go around in Tehran, declaring the use of tobacco to be tantamount to war against the Hidden Imam, Muhammad al-Mahdi.

Some doubts arose as to whether the fatwa was genuine; however, this was quickly dismissed as there was no sign of any remarks of renunciation from Shirazi, upon the circulation of the fatwa.

The case came to a close on 26 January 1892, when Naser al-Din yielded to the public pressure and cancelled the concession.

== Ecumenical policy in Samarra ==
Shirazi's protest allowed Shiism to become more popular in Samarra. The Sunnis began participating in the mourning ceremonies of Muharram, with their Shia neighbours. Shirazi's demeanor also inspired them to pursue religious careers. Shirazi tried to use this advantage to strengthen ties between the Shias and Sunnis. His great-grandson, Radhi Shirazi narrates when the Sunnis decided to build a seminary for themselves, after reaching a specific stage, they had run out of funds to complete the construction. They then turned to Shirazi for financial aid, to which Shirazi gladly provided them a generous sum, that helped complete their seminary.

Unfortunately, this level of influence gained by a Shia marja', was not going down well with Sultan Abdul Hamid II, who decided to establish more Sunni madrasas in Samarra to "protect the Sunnis from the tricks of the heretics [Shias]".

In 1893, when chaos began to spread across Samarra due to sectarian tensions, leading to the death of Shirazi's son, Muhammad, as well as one of his nephews. Pressures rose on the Shias, many Shias from the south were adamant on going to Samarra and violently ending the conflict, but were constantly rejected by Shirazi. Eventually, a complaint was made to the sultan, who allegedly worked hard to extinguish the conflict. In the meantime, the British and Russian governments both tried to take advantage of the situation and intervene by deploying their forces to one side of the conflict, choosing Shirazi. But to their disappointment, Shirazi rebuffed the two powers, claiming "it was a simple dispute among brothers" and of no concern to foreign nations.

== Personal life ==
Shirazi was married to his cousin, the daughter of Mirza Radhi al-Din Shirazi. From her he had four children, two sons and two daughters.

His eldest son, Muhammad, was killed in Samarra; reports indicate that his death was at the hands of the sectarian tension that happened at the time, and other reports, like that of his great-grandson, Muhammad Shirazi's, claim he was killed by the British. His second son Ali, became a high ranking scholar, and if it was not for his death in 1936, he would have been the marja' of his time.

His great-granddaughter is married to the current grand Ayatollah Sayyid Ali al-Sistani.

== Death ==
After facing a strenuous period after the tobacco protest, Shirazi died in Samarra on Wednesday 20 February 1895. He was then taken to Najaf to be buried in the Imam Ali Shrine.

== Legacy ==
Shirazi produced a large number of prominent students that proved to be great scholars of the age, and had a huge impact on the dissemination of the Islamic sciences. Some of them included:

- Sheikh Muhammad-Kadhim Khurasani
- Sayyid Muhammad-Kadhim Tabatabaei
- Sheikh Muhammad-Husayn Naini
- Sheikh Fadhlallah Nuri
- Sheikh Muhammad-Taqi Shirazi
- Sayyid Ismail al-Sadr.
- Muhammad bin Fadlallah Sarawi

As the supreme marja' of his time, this left him very little time to attend to scholarly. His duties as marja' did not leave him much time for publishing religious literature. He only had a few writings on the works of his mentor, Ansari.

The role he played in the tobacco boycott has been dubbed a "stunning" demonstration of the power of the marja'-i taqlid, and the protest itself has been cited as one of the issues that led to the Persian Constitutional Revolution a few years later.

== See also ==
- Murtadha Ansari
- Muhammad-Kadhim Khorasani
- Mirza Mahdi Shirazi
