= List of heads of state of Iran =

This article lists the heads of state of Iran since the establishment of the modern Iranian nation-state in 1501.

== Heads of State of Iran ==
=== The Expansive Realm of Iran (1501–1736) === ==== Safavid dynasty ====
No.	Name	Portrait	Birth–Death	Reign start	Reign end	Dynasty
Shah of Persia
1	Shah Ismail I		1487–1524	22 December 1501	23 May 1524	Safavid
1	Shah Ismail I		1487–1524	.		
2	Shah Tahmasp I		1514–1576	23 May 1524	14 May 1576	Safavid
2	Shah Tahmasp I		1514–1576	Regency: Div Sultan Rumlu: 23 May 1524 – 5 July 1527.; Chuha Soltan Takkalu: July 1527 – 1530/31.; Husayn Khan Shamlu: 1530/31 – 1533.		
3	Shah Ismail II		1537–1577	23 May 1576	24 November 1577	Safavid
3	Shah Ismail II		1537–1577	.		
4	Shah Mohammad Khodabanda		1532–1595/96	11 February 1578	1 October 1588	Safavid
4	Shah Mohammad Khodabanda		1532–1595/96	.		
5	Shah Abbas I		1571–1629	1 October 1588	19 January 1629	Safavid
5	Shah Abbas I		1571–1629	.		
6	Shah Safi		1611–1642	28 January 1629	12 May 1642	Safavid
6	Shah Safi		1611–1642	.		
7	Shah Abbas II		1632–1666	12 May 1642	25 September 1666	Safavid
7	Shah Abbas II		1632–1666	.		
8	Shah Suleiman I		1648–1694	1 November 1666	29 July 1694	Safavid
8	Shah Suleiman I		1648–1694	.		
9	Shah Soltan Hoseyn		1668–1726	6 August 1694	23 October 1722 (surrendered)	Safavid
9	Shah Soltan Hoseyn		1668–1726	.		
==== Ghilji rebellion ====
10	Mahmud Shah		1699–1725	23 October 1722	25 April 1725	Hotak
10	Mahmud Shah		1699–1725	.		
11	Ashraf Shah		1700–1730	26 April 1725	13 November 1729	Hotak
11	Ashraf Shah		1700–1730	.		
==== Safavid restoration ====
12	Shah Tahmasp II		1704–1740	10 November 1722	2 September 1732	Safavid
12	Shah Tahmasp II		1704–1740	He was crowned on 9 December 1729 after liberation of the Safavid Capital. Reigned at exile: 10 November 1722 – 8 November 1726.; July 1728 – 9 December 1729.		
13	Shah Abbas III		1732–1740	2 September 1732	8 March 1736	Safavid
13	Shah Abbas III		1732–1740	Regency: Nader Khan Afshar: 2 September 1732 – 8 March 1736.		
=== Realm of Iran (1736–1796) === ==== Afsharid dynasty ====
14	Nader Shah		1688–1747	8 March 1736	20 June 1747	Afsharid
14	Nader Shah		1688–1747	.		
15	Adel Shah		1719–1749	6 July 1747	29 September 1748	Afsharid
15	Adel Shah		1719–1749	.		
16	Ebrahim Shah		1724–1749	29 September 1748	May 1749	Afsharid
16	Ebrahim Shah		1724–1749	.		
17	Shahrokh Shah		1734–1796	May 1749	30 December 1749	Afsharid
17	Shahrokh Shah		1734–1796	Proclaimed as Shah at 30 September 1748 and one day later crowned at Mashhad.		
==== Second Safavid restoration ====
18	Suleiman II		1714–1763	13 January 1750	20 March 1750	Safavid
18	Suleiman II		1714–1763	Proclaimed after deposing and blinding of Shahrokh Shah and crowned at 14 January 1750.		
19	Ismail III		1733–1773	29 June 1750	1773	Safavid
19	Ismail III		1733–1773	He was a Puppet ruler who raised to the throne by Ali Mardan Khan Bakhtiari and Karim Khan Zand as a front to legitimize their rule. Regency: Karim Khan Zand: early 1751 – 1773		
==== Afsharid restoration ====
(17)	Shahrokh Shah		1734–1796	9 May 1755	14 May 1796	Afsharid
(17)	Shahrokh Shah		1734–1796	.		
==== Zand dynasty ====
Wakil-al Raʿāyā
20	Karim Khan		1705–1779	1773	1 March 1779	Zand
20	Karim Khan		1705–1779	.		
21	Abol-Fath Khan		1755–1787	6 March 1779	May/June 1779	Zand
21	Abol-Fath Khan		1755–1787	He and his younger brother Mohammad Ali Khan were Co-rulers.		
22	Mohammad Ali Khan		1760–1779	6 March 1779	19 June 1779	Zand
22	Mohammad Ali Khan		1760–1779	He and his elder brother Abol-Fath Khan were Co-rulers until May/June 1779.		
(21)	Abol-Fath Khan		1755–1787	19 June 1779	22 August 1779	Zand
(21)	Abol-Fath Khan		1755–1787	.		
23	Sadeq Khan		?–1781	22 August 1779	14 March 1781	Zand
23	Sadeq Khan		?–1781	.		
24	Ali-Morad Khan		c. 1720–1785	15 March 1781	11 February 1785	Zand
24	Ali-Morad Khan		c. 1720–1785	.		
–	Bagher Shah		?–1786	12 February 1785	17 February 1785 (surrendered)	—N/a
–	Bagher Shah		?–1786	After the death of Ali-Morad Khan, Bagher Khan Khorasgani Governor of Isfahan proclaimed himself as Shah and mentioned himself in the Khutbah and on coins. He was defeated from the corps of Jafar Khan.		
25	Jafar Khan		?–1789	18 February 1785	23 January 1789	Zand
25	Jafar Khan		?–1789	.		
26	Seyd Morad Khan		?–1789	23 January 1789	10 May 1789	Zand
26	Seyd Morad Khan		?–1789	.		
27	Lotf Ali Khan		c. 1769–1794	10 May 1789	20 March 1794	Zand
27	Lotf Ali Khan		c. 1769–1794	.		
Shah of Iran
(27)	Lotf Ali Shah		c. 1769–1794	21 March 1794	30 October 1794	Zand
(27)	Lotf Ali Shah		c. 1769–1794	.		
=== Qajar dynasty (1796–1925) ===
28	Agha Mohammad Shah		1742–1797	14 May 1796	17 June 1797	Qajar
28	Agha Mohammad Shah		1742–1797	Agha Mohammad decided to move his capital to the small town of Tehran on 1786. He was formally crowned as Shah during spring 1796 at the Mugan plain, on his return after the conquest of Tbilisi.		
29	Fath-Ali Shah		1772–1834	17 June 1797	23 October 1834	Qajar
29	Fath-Ali Shah		1772–1834	.		
30	Mohammad Shah		1808–1848	23 October 1834	5 September 1848	Qajar
30	Mohammad Shah		1808–1848	.		
31	Naser al-Din Shah		1831–1896	5 September 1848	1 May 1896	Qajar
31	Naser al-Din Shah		1831–1896	Queen-mother Mahd-e Olia: 5 September 1848 – 1 October 1848.		
32	Mozaffar ad-Din Shah		1853–1907	1 May 1896	3 January 1907	Qajar
32	Mozaffar ad-Din Shah		1853–1907	.		
33	Mohammad Ali Shah		1872–1925	3 January 1907	16 July 1909 (surrendered)	Qajar
33	Mohammad Ali Shah		1872–1925	.		
34	Ahmad Shah		1898–1930	16 July 1909	15 December 1925	Qajar
34	Ahmad Shah		1898–1930	Reigned in exile: from 2 December 1923; Regency: Ali Reza Azod al-Molk: 16 July 1909 – 22 September 1910.; Abolqasem Naser ol-Molk: March 1911 – 21 July 1914.; Prince Mohammad Hassan Mirza: 24 March 1924 – 31 October 1925.		
=== Pahlavi dynasty (1925–1979) ===
No.	Name		Birth–Death	Took office	Left office	Political Affiliation
Presidency of the Provisional Government
35	Reza Khan		1878–1944	31 October 1925	15 December 1925	Military
35	Reza Khan		1878–1944	The Presidency of the Provisional Government was granted to Reza Khan Pahlavi by the Constituent Assembly on 31 October 1925, following the exile and deposition of Ahmad Shah Qajar.		
No.	Name		Birth–Death	Took office	Left office	Dynasty
Shah of Iran
(35)	Reza Shah		1878–1944	15 December 1925	16 September 1941 (surrendered)	Pahlavi
(35)	Reza Shah		1878–1944	Elected as Shah of Iran by the Majils under the Persian Constitution of 1906. Forced to abdicate by the joint Anglo-Soviet invasion of Iran in 1941.		
36	Mohammad Reza Shah		1919–1980	16 September 1941	11 February 1979	Pahlavi
36	Mohammad Reza Shah		1919–1980	Reigned in exile: 16–22 August 1953 (Baghdad; from 18 August at Rome); from 16 January 1979 (Egypt; from 22 January at Morocco).		
No.	Name		Birth–Death	Took office	Left office	Political Affiliation
=== Islamic Republic of Iran (1979–present) ===
Supreme Leader of Iran (Note: Called Supreme Leader from 3 December 1979 on)
37	Ruhollah Khomeini		1900–1989	4 February 1979	3 June 1989 (Note: On 3 June 1989, at 22:20 IRST, Khomeini died; between that time and 4 June, the office was vacant.)	Independent
37	Ruhollah Khomeini		1900–1989	Appointed as Supreme Leader of Iran under the 1979 constitution.		
38	Ali Khamenei		1939–2026	4 June 1989	28 February 2026 (Note: Khamenei died at 08:10 IRST on 28 February 2026, between this time and the 1 March, there was a power vacuum.)	Combatant Clergy Association Independent (Note: Resigned from Combatant Clergy Association after selection as Supreme Leader, however he was officially until 2019 member.)
38	Ali Khamenei		1939–2026	Elected as interim Supreme Leader, before assuming office permanently in August 1989. Assassinated during joint Israeli–United States strikes on Iran in February 2026.		
—	Interim Leadership Council		—	1 March 2026	8 March 2026	Independent (Pezeshkian and Arafi) and Society of Seminary Teachers of Qom (Mohseni-Eje'i)
—	Interim Leadership Council		—	Interim collective head of state composed of Masoud Pezeshkian, Gholam-Hossein Mohseni-Eje'i, and Ayatollah Alireza Arafi.		
39	Mojtaba Khamenei		1969–	8 March 2026	Incumbent	Independent (Patron of the Front of Islamic Revolution Stability)

== See also ==
- List of monarchs of Persia
- List of premiers of Iran (1699–1907)
- List of prime ministers of Iran
- List of presidents of Iran
