= Mahdi Mirbaqiri =

Iranian politician and cleric (born 1961)

Ayatollah Sayyid Mahdi Mirbaqiri
- مهدی میرباقری
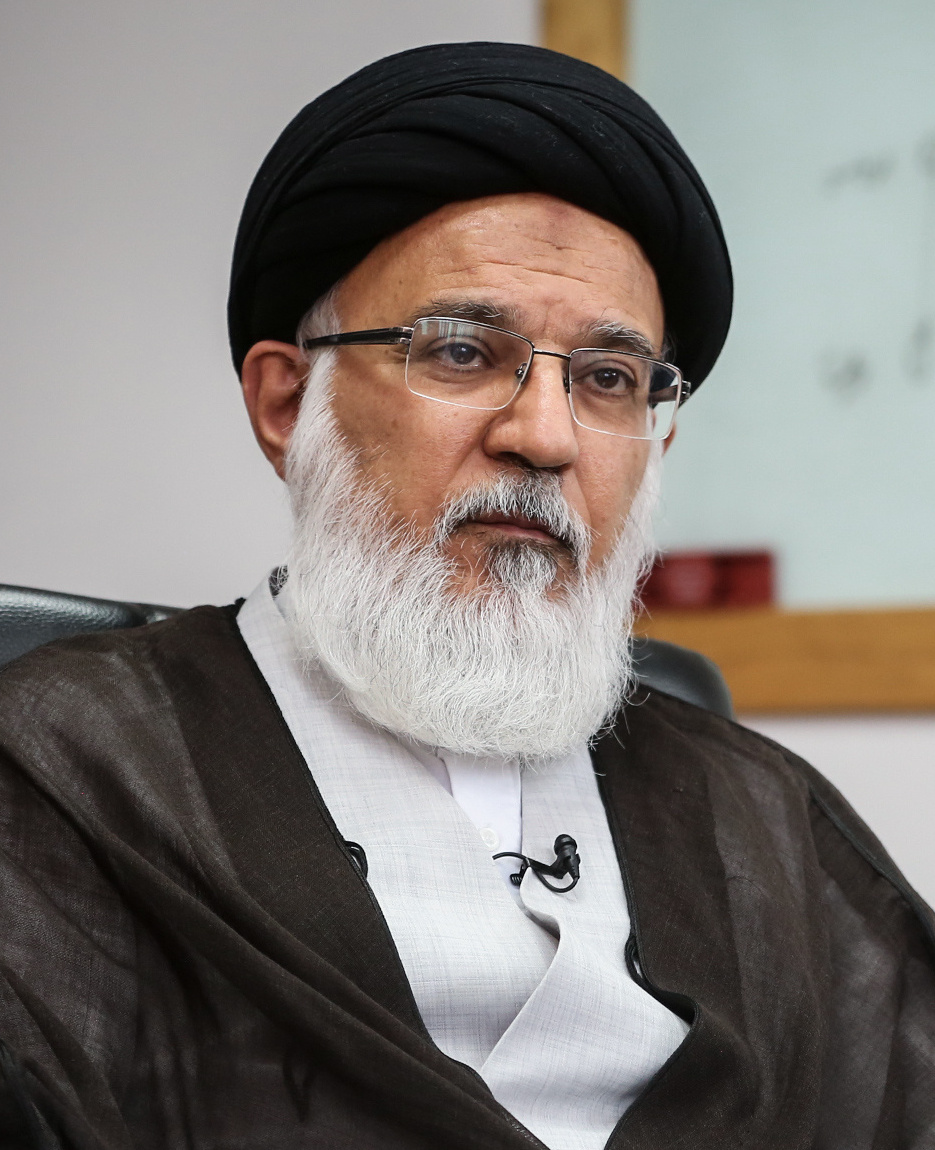
- Mirbaqiri in August 2020

Member of Assembly of Experts
- Incumbent
- Assumed office 21 May 2024
- Constituency: Semnan province
- In office 24 May 2016 – 21 May 2024
- Constituency: Alborz province

Personal details
- Born: Mohammad Mahdi Mirbaqiri Shahrudi; 1961 (age 64–65) Qom, Iran
- Party: Society of Seminary Teachers of Qom
- Other political affiliations: Front of Islamic Revolution Stability (spiritual leader)
- Education: Qom Hawza

Military service
- Allegiance: Iran
- Branch/service: Islamic Revolutionary Guard Corps; Basij
- Unit: 17th Ali ibn Abi Taleb Division
- Battles/wars: Iran–Iraq War

Mohammad Mahdi Mirbaqiri Shahroudi (Note: Persian: محمد مهدی میرباقری شاهرودی) (born 1961; alternatively Mahdi Mirbagheri) is an Iranian ultra-hardline politician and Shia cleric. He is the head of the Qom Academy of Islamic Sciences, and is a member of the Assembly of Experts representing Semnan province. Mirbaqiri is also the spiritual leader of the fundamentalist Iranian Principlist Front of Islamic Revolution Stability (FIRS).

Born in Qom, Iran to a Shia clerical family, Mirbaqiri took part in the Iranian Revolution of 1978-1979 against Shah Mohammad Reza Pahlavi as a teenager. He later fought in the Iran–Iraq War (1980–1988) as a member of the 17th Ali ibn Abi Talib Division of the Islamic Revolutionary Guard Corps.

Mirbaqiri is a high-ranking Ayatollah and represents the most conservative wing of the clerical establishment within the Islamic Republic of Iran. He is a close confidant of Supreme Leader Mojtaba Khamenei.

Mirbaqiri wants to accelerate the end of times by inspiring “widespread fighting” and a “comprehensive clash” with the West. He believes that Iran is more powerful than the United States, and that negotiations with the West are only good if Islamic civilization triumphs over the "infidels."

== Early life and education ==
Mahdi Mirbaqiri was born in 1961 in Qom, Iran to a Shia Muslim clerical family with roots in the Shahrud region of northern Iran. His father, Hasan Mirbaqiri, was a Shia cleric and preacher.

Mirbaqiri began seminary courses in 1975 at age 14. He took part in political activities against Mohammad Reza Pahlavi's rule around this time and participated in the 1978-1979 Iranian Revolution under Ruhollah Khomeini. Mirbaqiri then continued Islamic religious studies under Mousa Shubairi Zanjani.

== Military career ==
Mirbaqiri fought in the Iran–Iraq War against the Ba'athist Iraqi forces as a member of the 17th Ali ibn Abi Talib Division of the Islamic Revolutionary Guard Corps.

== Political career ==
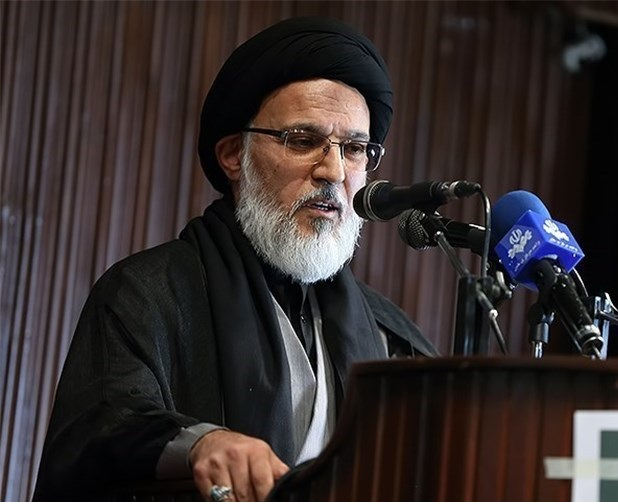
Mirbaqiri in 2018

Mirbaqiri was elected as the representative of Alborz province in the Assembly of Experts in the elections of March 2016. He was elected as the representative of Semnan province in the Assembly of Experts in the elections of March 2024.

Following the February 2026 assassination of Ali Khamenei, Mirbaqiri's name was raised as a potential candidate for the position of supreme leader prior to the 2026 election. Howevever, his close confidant and Khamenei's son, Mojtaba, was eventually elected.

== Views ==
Mirbaqiri is an ultra-hardline cleric.

=== Accelerating the end of times through war ===
Mirbaqiri said in an interview that he wanted to accelerate the end of times by inspiring “widespread fighting” and a “comprehensive clash” with the Western world. He believes that conflict between "believers and infidels" is inevitable.

=== Negotiations with the West ===
On the subject of negotiations with the Western world, Mirbaqiri said that: “Negotiations are good, if Iran’s approach to them leads to the triumph of [Islamic] civilization, but if negotiations are carried out to cooperate with the society of the infidels, then they are bad.” He also opined that “Our competitors have understood that America is not all that powerful...You can negotiate with them and not surrender. If they exit the negotiations, so will we. [We are] ... more powerful than America."

=== Science and religion ===
He has written about the relationship between science and religion as a theorist. Mirbaqiri proposes that sciences can be categorized as religious or non-religious.

=== Shia jurisprudence ===
Mirbaqiri is an expert on Shia jurisprudence and has issued several fatwas (religious verdicts) on various topics.
