= Arafi =

Arafi is an Arabic surname. Notable people with the surname include:

- Alireza Arafi (born 1959), Iranian Shia cleric
- Rababe Arafi (born 1991), middle-distance runner from Morocco
