= 2026 Iranian supreme leader election =

- 3–8 March 2026

88 members of the Assembly of Experts (statutory) 59 votes needed to win
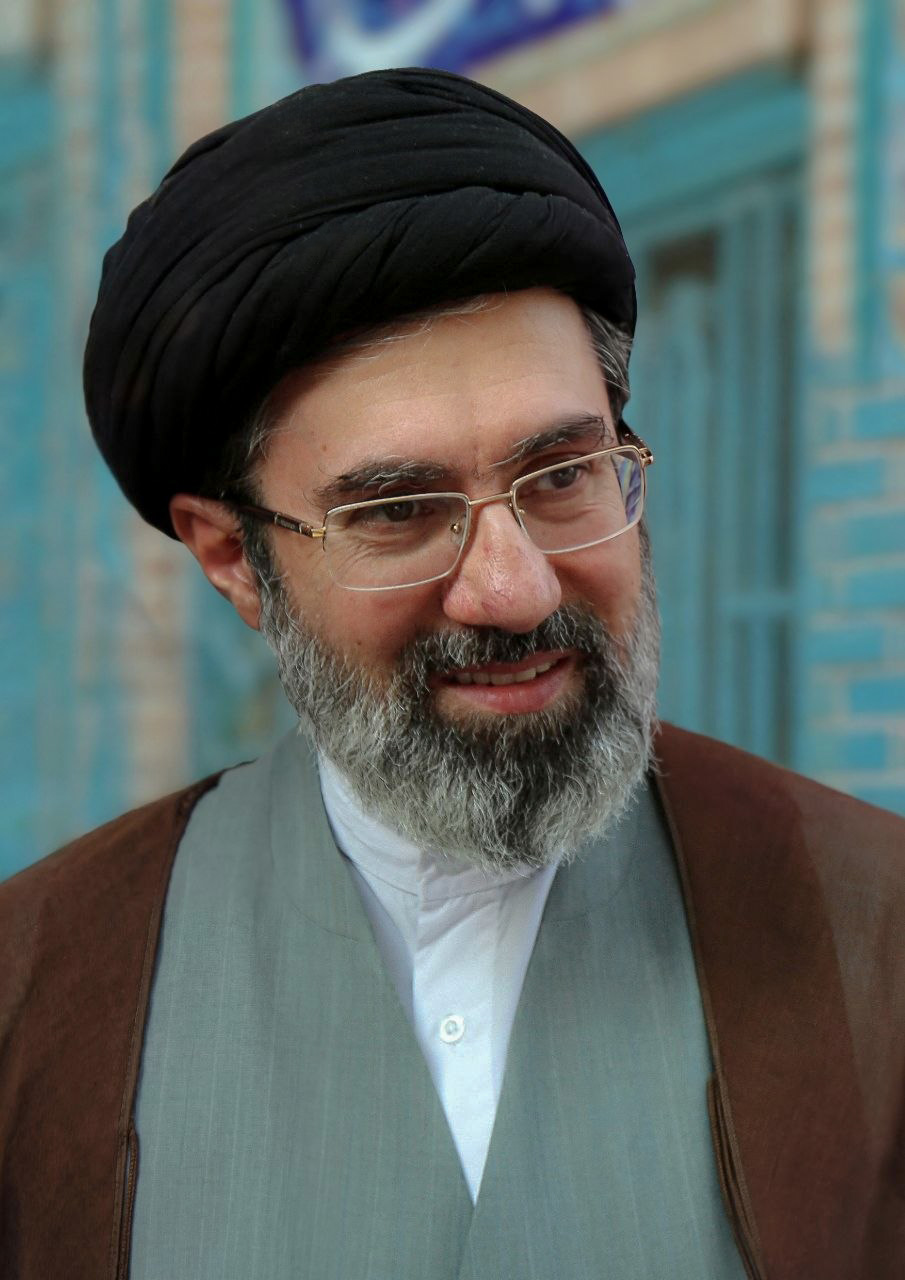

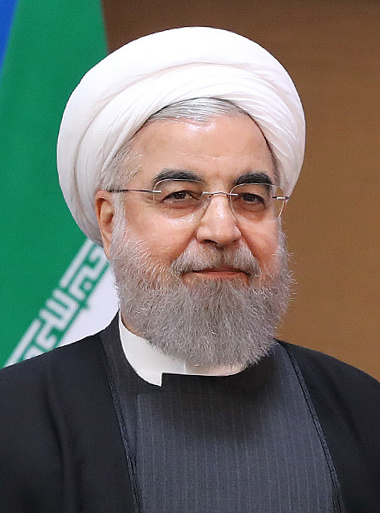

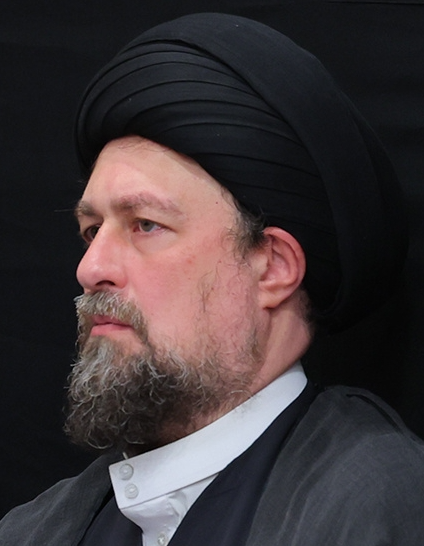
| Nominee | Mojtaba Khamenei | Hassan Rouhani | Hassan Khomeini |
| Party | Independent | MDP | Independent |
| Alliance | Principlists | Reformists | Reformists |
| Electoral vote | ≥59 | Unknown | Unknown |
Supreme Leader before election
Ali Khamenei (Note: The Interim Leadership Council took over the duties of the Supreme Leader between 1 March and 8 March.)
Independent
(Principlists)
Elected Supreme Leader
Mojtaba Khamenei
Principlists

An election for the third supreme leader of Iran by the Assembly of Experts was held from 3 to 8 March 2026, following the assassination of Ali Khamenei on 28 February during the 2026 Iran war. Mojtaba Khamenei, son of Ali Khamenei, was announced as the new supreme leader on 9 March.

Constitutionally, the Assembly of Experts is tasked to select the next leader following an absence in the position, via a council that examines possible candidates in secrecy while advising the current leader. Its sixth and current session began after it was elected in 2024 and is scheduled to sit until 2032.

Prior to his death, Ali Khamenei had not publicly discussed his replacement, nor had anyone been officially designated to be successor or proposed as a potential nominee. However, since 2014, various news outlets reported on the potential candidates and that the succession of Khamenei is deemed to have been decided but not disclosed publicly. According to The New York Times, the potential and likely candidates to succeed Khamenei were former president Hassan Rouhani and Hassan Khomeini, the grandson of the Islamic Republic's founder, Ruhollah Khomeini. Other potential candidates to succeed Khamenei included his son (and eventual successor) Mojtaba, his aides Asghar Hijazi, Ali Larijani, Sadiq Larijani, Alireza Arafi, Mohammad-Mahdi Mirbagheri, and Mohsen Araki. Former president Ebrahim Raisi was often mentioned in the frontrunners for the position prior to his death in a helicopter crash in 2024.

On 3 March, Iranian media reported that the Assembly of Experts' office in Qom had been bombed, reportedly during a session convened for electoral purposes.

== Background ==
=== Plans ===
As early as in 2014, as well as later in 2025, it was reported that the succession of Khamenei is deemed to have been decided but not disclosed publicly. Various names were mentioned to be potential candidates by media outlets. In December 2015, Akbar Hashemi Rafsanjani stated that a committee within the Assembly of Experts was "examining potential candidates to be the next Supreme Leader" and indicated that the Assembly of Experts could consider choosing "a council of leaders if needed" instead of a single leader. During his presidency, Hassan Rouhani was occasionally mentioned by some as a potential successor. In 2016, Ahmad Khatami told the press that a committee of three Assembly of Experts members had submitted three names to the supreme leader "to seek his verdict", but later clarified that his comments were "hypothetical" and attributed any misreporting to the media.

In June 2019, Mohsen Araki said that the committee had drafted a "top secret list of prospective supreme leaders" which would be presented to the Assembly of Experts "when it is necessary." Hashem Hashemzadeh Herisi confirmed the existence of such a committee, noting that the names on the list would remain confidential and that the committee's decisions were not final, as the next leader must be elected by a majority of Assembly of Experts members. Earlier, in February 2019, Mohsen Mojtahed Shabestari dismissed allegations that Ebrahim Raisi and Ahmad Khatami were considered candidates, stating that the issue "had never been debated at the Assembly."

As of 2023, the Assembly of Experts was reported to be discussing a potential program to reestablish the post of Deputy Supreme Leader, last held by Hussein-Ali Montazeri from 1985 to 1989. In November 2024, government leaker Abbas Palizdar said that Mojtaba Khamenei, son of Ali Khamenei, had left the seminary to succeed his father. According to Al Arabiya, the Assembly of Experts had reportedly nominated three individuals to replace Khamenei. On 16 November 2024, Israeli news website Ynet reported that Ali Khamenei had elected Mojtaba Khamanei, a claim later denied by the pro-government Tehran Times on 11 January 2025. One Assembly of Experts member stated that a successor had already been chosen but declined to reveal the identity of the selected individual for safety reasons.

Shortly before the Twelve-Day War between Iran and Israel in 2025, Khamenei requested that the Assembly of Experts prepare for the selection of his successor. Following US strikes on Iranian nuclear sites during the war, The New York Times reported that Khamenei had nominated three senior clerics in case of his assassination. On 28 February 2026, shortly after the Israeli-US strikes that started the 2026 Iran war, The New York Times identified these clerics as Gholam-Hossein Mohseni-Eje'i, Asghar Hijazi, and Hassan Khomeini. Reuters stated that Khamenei had supported either Eje'i or Khomeini.

=== Pre-election analysis ===
In 2023, Israeli military intelligence assessed that President Ebrahim Raisi could succeed Khamenei. John Bolton argued that the regime would be vulnerable in the event of Khamenei's death. Although Raisi was often mentioned as the frontrunner, he died in a helicopter crash in May 2024. In the aftermath of his death, Mojtaba Khamenei's status as a potential successor to his father became more plausible, although Ali Khamenei had reportedly opposed this. The Middle East Institute suggested that appointing his own son as successor could cause conflict within Iran's political and religious leadership.

Following the 2024 election, 92-year-old Ayatollah Mohammad-Ali Movahedi Kermani became the new chairman of the Assembly of Experts. Hassan Khomeini, the grandson of Ruhollah Khomeini is also considered a possible successor, however, Iran International asserted he is unlikely due to his "exclusion from the regime's upper echelon" and that he was "sidelined after being barred from running for the Assembly of Experts" in 2016.

=== 2026 crisis and assassination of Ali Khamenei ===
In an interview with Politico discussing the 2025–2026 Iranian protests, US president Donald Trump called Ali Khamenei a "sick man" and called for new leadership in Iran. The Iranian government then threatened to declare an Islamic jihad against the Western world in the event of his death. Ali Larijani surpassed Ali Khamenei as designated sitting secretary of SNSC to be acting supreme leader because of the highly likely event of decapitation strikes.

On 28 February 2026, Khamenei was assassinated in an airstrike conducted by Israel and the United States; early on 1 March, his death was confirmed by the Iranian Supreme National Security Council and by state media. After Khamenei's death, a leadership crisis began, with multiple potential candidates being named. Prior to his death, Khamenei had not discussed his replacement and had said the selection must be made without shame or regard for expediency, rather based on the three principles of "truth, the need of the country and God".

=== Interim Leadership Council ===
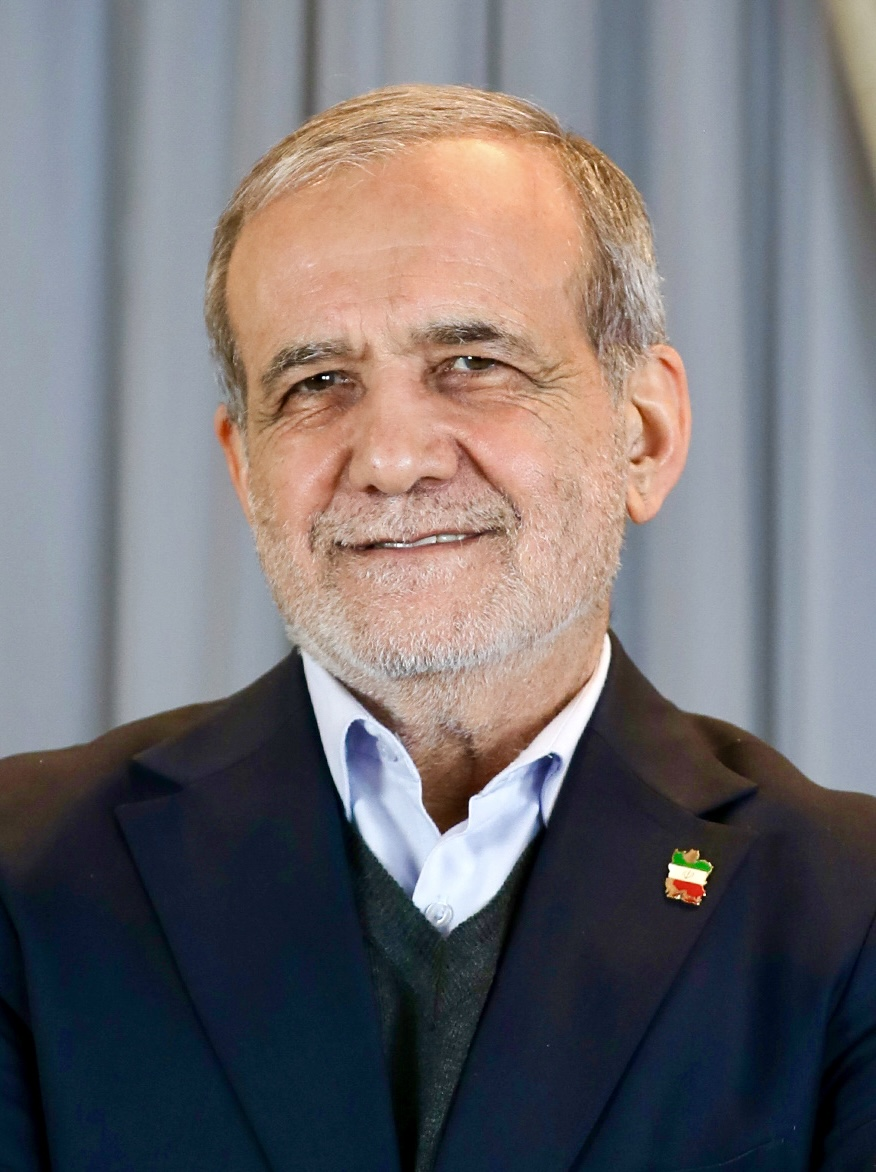
Masoud Pezeshkian

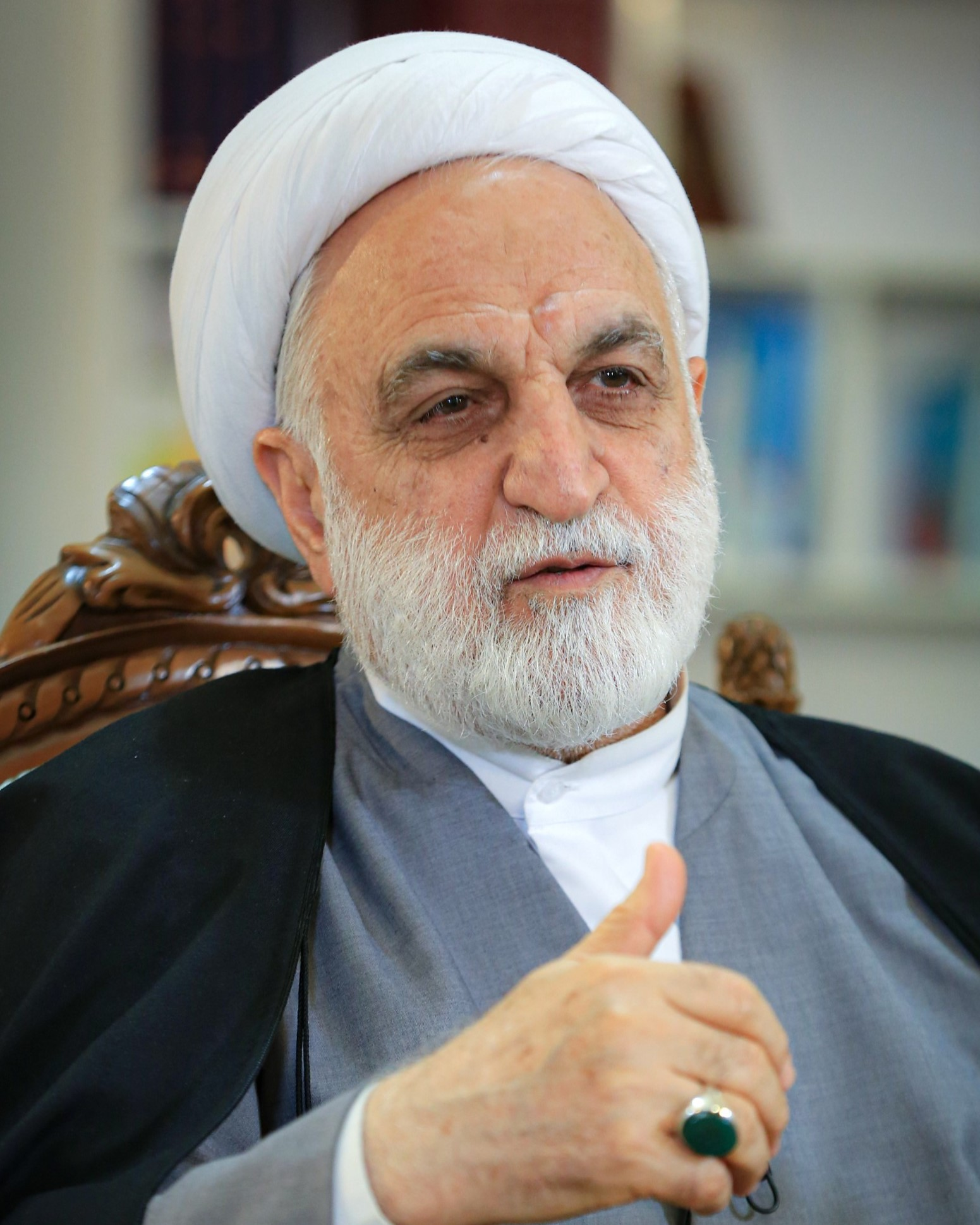
Gholam-Hossein Mohseni-Eje'i

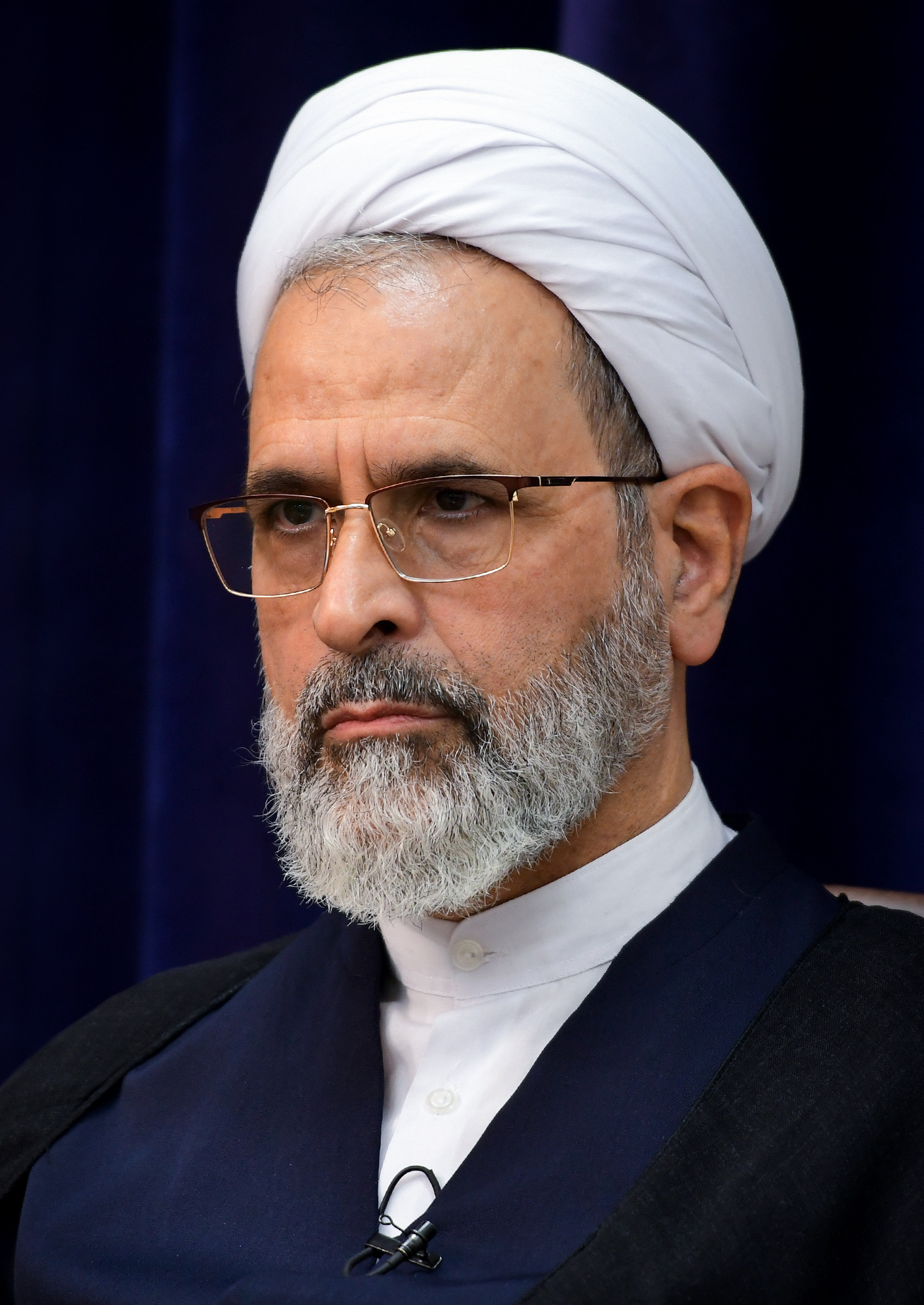
Alireza Arafi

After the assassination of Khamenei, an Interim Leadership Council took over his role, pending election of a new leader, in accordance with Article 111 of the Constitution of Iran. The Interim Leadership Council, established on the morning of 1 March 2026, then consisted of Alireza Arafi of the Guardian Council, Chief Justice Gholam-Hossein Mohseni-Eje'i, Speaker of the Islamic Consultative Assembly Mohammad Bagher Ghalibaf, and President Masoud Pezeshkian. Later that day, however, Iranian foreign minister Abbas Araghchi described a "group of three" by office, not including the Speaker of the Parliament. Furthermore, he assumed that the process of electing a new supreme leader would take "one or two days".

The BBC reported that Alireza Arafi was nominated as interim supreme leader on 28 February before any successor was elected. Ghalibaf and Larijani remained putative contenders, however, not least because they (amongst others), have long been seen as more or less likely prospects from the upper echelons of the Islamic Republic by academics and analysts.

The IRGC was reported to have threatened members of the Assembly of Experts in order to secure a quick result and silence dissenters.

== Electoral system ==
The supreme leader of Iran is selected by members of the Assembly of Experts to serve a conditional life tenure. The tenure of the leader is conditional upon his continuing to have the qualifications referred to in Articles 5 and 109 of the Constitution of Iran – according to Article 111 losing any of said conditions is grounds for dismissal by the Assembly of Experts. According to the same article of the constitution, if the incumbent supreme leader dies in office or is dismissed, the Assembly of Experts should as soon as possible hold a session to appoint a successor. The Assembly of Experts is an 88-member body of directly elected Mujtahids, with each of the 31 provinces being treated as a single constituency. The candidates for each province's allocated seat(s) must first be vetted by the Guardian Council, whose members are, in turn, appointed either directly or indirectly by the supreme leader.

According to Article 111, during times when the position of Supreme Leader is vacant, a provisional Leadership Council is to be convened. This council consists of the President, the Chief Justice, and one of the six clerics of the Guardian Council who is picked by the Expediency Discernment Council. The council is mandated to carry out the interim duties of the supreme leader until a permanent successor is selected.

== Candidates ==
=== Main candidates ===
| Candidate | Born | Portfolio | Ref. |
|---|---|---|---|
| Mojtaba Khamenei | 8 September 1969 (age 57); Mashhad, Iran | Second son of Ali Khamenei; Former Islamic Revolutionary Guard Corps officer; Vakil of the Office of the Supreme Leader | |
| Hassan Khomeini | 23 July 1972 (age 54); Qom, Iran | Grandson of the first Supreme Leader Ruhollah Khomeini; Caretaker of the Mausoleum of Ruhollah Khomeini | |
| Hassan Rouhani | 12 November 1948 (age 78); Sorkheh, Iran | Former President of Iran; Former Secretary of the Supreme National Security Council; Former member of the Assembly of Experts | |

=== Other candidates ===
| Candidate | Born | Portfolio | Ref. |
|---|---|---|---|
| Alireza Arafi | 1959 (age 66–67); Meybod, Iran | Ayatollah; Member of the Interim Leadership Council; Member of the Guardian Council; Member of the Assembly of Experts | |
| Mahdi Mirbagheri | 1961 (age 64–65); Qom, Iran | Ayatollah; Member of the Assembly of Experts; Head of the Qom Academy of Islamic Sciences | |
| Sadiq Larijani | 12 March 1963 (age 63); Najaf, Iraq | Ayatollah; Chairman of the Expediency Discernment Council; Former Chief Justice of Iran; Former member of the Guardian Council; Younger brother of Ali Larijani | |

== Election ==
=== Initial developments ===
According to Iran International, the Islamic Revolutionary Guard Corps (IRGC) tried to appoint a new supreme leader quickly on 28 February after the assassination of Ali Khamenei, bypassing the formal electoral process that involves the Assembly of Experts. Iran International stated that IRGC commanders then pressured Assembly of Experts members to vote for Mojtaba Khamenei as Supreme Leader with "repeated contacts and psychological and political pressure" starting early on 3 March, leading to an online Assembly of Experts meeting that day.

=== First meeting (3 March) ===
By 3 March 2026, several media sources had stated that Mojtaba Khamenei was a frontrunner to be the supreme leader, with a formal announcement pending due to the ongoing war with Israel and the United States. Other candidates, including Arafi and Hassan Khomeini, remained under consideration.

A first electoral session was held online on 3 March, after the assembly's five or six attempts to meet in person failed due to security reasons. Leaders of the Assembly of Experts stated that the election had to be held quickly because of the war. Members described the atmosphere of the online meeting as "unnatural": those who presented arguments against Mojtaba Khamenei were given "limited time" to speak, discussion was cut off, and a vote was then held. US and Israeli bombs hit the Assembly of Experts office in the city of Qom after the votes had been cast but before the count had been completed. Zed TV, a Telegram channel, claimed that the bombing specifically targeted the meeting.

According to sources reported by The New York Times (NYT), Khamenei was backed by the IRGC and the new commander in chief Ahmad Vahidi. Mohammad Ali Aziz Jaffari, an IRGC strategist, Mohammad Bagher Ghalibaf, parliament speaker, and Hossein Taeb, former head of IRGC's intelligence unit also endorsed Khamenei. The moderate faction pushed for ex-president Hassan Rouhani and Hassan Khomeini, grandson of Khomeini who is aligned with the reformist parties. The faction was allegedly supported by Ali Larijani, head of National Security Council who believed Khamenei would polarize the country, Pezeshkian, and several senior officials and clerics. The moderates put forth Arafi, a scholar and jurist without sway in policy or military circles, as a compromise candidate. However, the assembly sided against the moderates as the rage against Trump and Netanyahu fueled a determination to avenge the assassination. Mojtaba Khamenei won the necessary two-thirds majority on that day. The officials and the state media were alerted of the result. The announcement of Khamenei's succession was expected on 4 March with the dawn call to prayer.

=== Second meeting (5 March) ===
After the result of the 3 March session was announced to Assembly of Experts members, objections were raised against the procedure. NYT said Larijani argued the online vote was invalid because voting has to be in person according to the constitution. He called off the succession announcement citing risks to Khamenei's life, and suggested waiting until after the war ended. Khamenei also declined the position, although likely as a formality.

Leaders of the Assembly of Experts announced that a second electoral session would be held on 5 March, to be "managed from a location near the shrine of Fatima Masumeh in Qom", aiming at reducing the chance of an airstrike because of the shrine's religious significance. The written will by the late Khamenei was presented during the meeting, showing that he had requested an in-person meeting for electing the new Supreme Leader, and do not wish his son or his family members to succeed him. One principalist denounced the moderates for launching a "coup". Meanwhile, IRGC commanders continued pressuring Assembly of Experts members. Eight members stated that they would boycott the second session due to "heavy pressure" by the IRGC in favor of Mojtaba Khamenei. On 5 March, an announcement of Mojtaba Khamenei's election was expected by several sources despite strong opposition from some members. Mohammad Mohajeri, a conservative commentator, said that appointing a leader at the time could be divisive and should be avoided while the war was ongoing.

On 6 March, parliamentarian Mohsen Zanganeh stated that two candidates remained in the running, that both were "reluctant to accept the position", and that the new supreme leader would be "introduced" by 8 March. On the same day, journalist Behrouz Turani, writing in Iran International, stated that the Expediency Discernment Council had "moved to suspend the Assembly of Experts ... and shift authority" to the Interim Leadership Council in response to the Assembly of Experts' difficulties in making a decision. Turani suggested that Ali Larijani had pushed for his brother Sadiq Larijani, head of the Expediency Discernment Council, to become the supreme leader.

=== Third meeting (8 March) ===
The final meeting for the election was convened on 8 March, reportedly after strong push by IRGC's Vahidi and Jaffari in response to Pezeshkian's apology to neighbouring countries. Taeb asked all 88 Assembly members to vote for Khamenei. NYT reported that the Assembly agreed that a virtual vote is valid under wartime protocols, and members voted with couriers hand-carrying ballots for counting. Iran International however said the vote was in person with at least around 59 members attending, and some clerics were not informed of the meeting despite it is quorate. Later, Assembly of Experts members Ahmad Alamulhuda, Mohammad-Mahdi Mirbagheri, and Mohsen Heidari Alekasir all stated that a choice of successor had been made, but they did not name the chosen individual, and they differed in their views about the certainty of the procedure. Alamolhoda said that any change to the decision was constitutionally forbidden and that the delay was in waiting for Hashem Hosseini Bushehri to formally make the announcement. Mirbagheri said that "some obstacles regarding the process [still needed] to be resolved". Alekasir said that security risks were preventing an in-person meeting for the formal decision.

=== Results ===
Early on 9 March, the Assembly of Experts officially announced that it had chosen Mojtaba Khamenei to be the new supreme leader in a unanimous vote. NYT said Khamenei received 59 out of 88 votes, above the two-thirds majority required, while Iran International suggested Khamenei received "roughly 50 or more" votes. Despite the election, several senior Iranian clerics have questioned Mojtaba Khamenei's ability to lead in light of his health and managerial capacity, and they have called to go back to the temporary leadership council.

Results according to the New York Times
| Candidate | Party | Votes | % |
|---|---|---|---|
| Mojtaba Khamenei | Principalists | 59 | 67.05 |
| Hassan Rouhani or Hassan Khomeini | Reformists | | |
| Unclear | | 29 | 32.95 |
| Total | | 88 | 100.00 |

Results according to Bloomberg and Iran International
| Candidate | Party | Votes | % |
|---|---|---|---|
| Mojtaba Khamenei | Principalists | 50 | 84.75 |
| Unknown | Unknown | | |
| Unclear | | 9 | 15.25 |
| Total | | 59 | 100.00 |

== Reactions ==
=== Domestic ===
President Masoud Pezeshkian sent congratulations to Mojtaba Khamenei, saying "the achievements of your great martyred father in preserving the system and advancing the revolution have provided a solid foundation for the future of Iran, which, under your leadership, will reach a bright horizon of sustainable independence, scientific and technological progress and comprehensive development." Chairman of the Assembly of Experts said he congratulated "the honorable nation and the Islamic Ummah" on Khamenei's "worthy, fateful, and decisive election" as the successor.

Chief Justice Gholam-Hossein Mohseni-Eje'i expressed congratulations over the election. The head of the Atomic Energy Organization of Iran also congratulated Mojtaba Khamenei on his election. The Speaker of the Islamic Consultative Assembly: ...congratulated him, and stated: Khamenei is a man of virtue and knowledge, proficient in current and governmental affairs, modernist, and a believer in the approach of the second step of the revolution and the knowledge-based and basic science fields.

=== Foreign ===
US president Donald Trump claimed prior to the election that "the attack was so successful it knocked out most of the candidates. It's not going to be anybody that we were thinking of because they are all dead. Second or third place is dead." Israeli defense minister Israel Katz said Ali Khamenei's successor, regardless of identity, would be considered a legitimate target for assassination. The Israel Defense Forces echoed in a Persian statement on X, referencing the assassination of Khamenei and stating that the "hand of the State of Israel will continue to pursue every successor and every person who seeks to appoint a successor. We warn all those who intend to participate in the successor selection meeting that we will not hesitate to target you either."

Soon after the result was announced, Trump said that the expected election of Mojtaba Khamenei was "unacceptable" and that he needed to be involved in the appointment. Russian president Vladimir Putin congratulated Mojtaba Khamenei on becoming Iran's new supreme leader, saying he was "confident that you will continue your father's path with honor." He added: "We reiterate our steadfast support for Tehran and solidarity with our Iranian friends. Russia has been and will remain a reliable partner for Iran." Azerbaijani president Ilham Aliyev, Armenian prime minister Nikol Pashinyan and Georgian prime minister Irakli Kobakhidze congratulated Khamenei on his election. Iraqi prime minister Mohammed Shia' al-Sudani also congratulated Khamenei on his appointment.

Oman's Sultan sent a "cable of congratulations" to Khamenei. North Korean Ministry of Foreign Affairs spokesperson said "we respect the rights and choice of the Iranian people to elect their supreme leader". China’s Foreign Ministry spokesman Guo Jiakun told reporters that Iran’s decision to appoint the younger Khamenei was “based on its constitution”. Yemen's Houthis: “We congratulate Iran, its leadership and people, on the selection of Sayyid Mojtaba Khamenei as Supreme Leader of the Islamic Revolution at this important and pivotal juncture,”

==== Analysts ====
According to Iran International, the appointment of Khamenei as supreme leader marks the completion of the Iranian government's shift away from public backing. Some analysts described Khamenei's selection as an indication that Iran had returned to hereditary rule after abandoning it following the 1979 revolution. Scholars Reuel Marc Gerecht and Ray Takeyh wrote in The Wall Street Journal that it represented "the collapse of the last egalitarian pillar of the revolution, namely that the mullahs, unlike decadent Persian shahs, don't do dynastic succession."

== Aftermath ==
Khamenei has not made any public appearances since his appointment as Supreme Leader, leading to speculations that he was incapacitated. Iranian government eventually confirmed that he had been injured in previous airstrikes. On 12 March, four days after his appointment, a written message—containing no video or audio—attributed to Khamenei was released, promising revenge for the "martyrs". Khamenei is expected to continue on vengeance rather than strategy or reconciliation.

On 17 March, Ali Larijani was assassinated by an Israeli airstrike.
