= Interim Leadership Council =

Temporary collective head of state of Iran

- شورای موقت رهبری (Persian)
- Emblem of the Islamic Republic of Iran

- Flag of the Islamic Republic of Iran

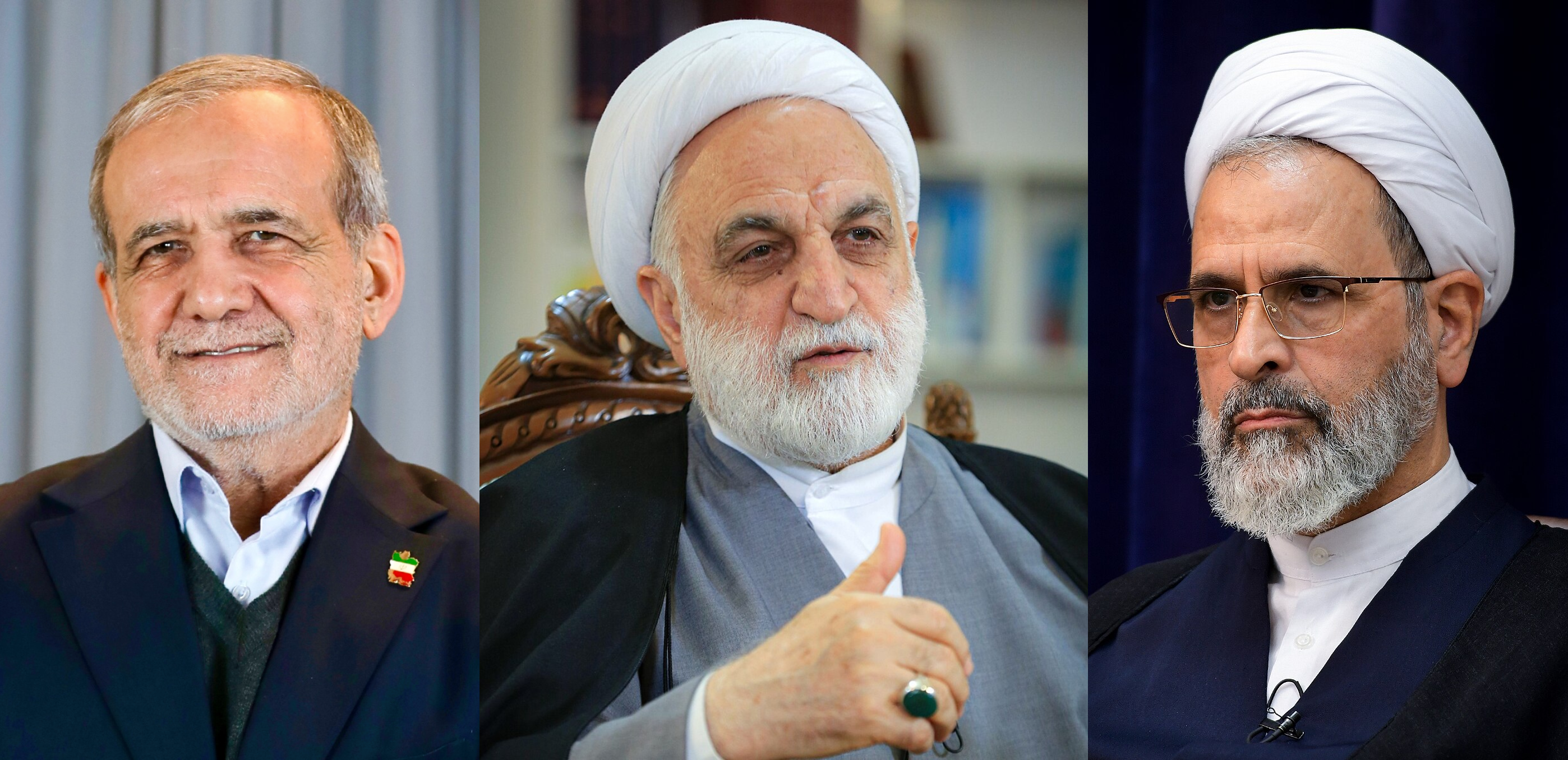
- Members of the first council from left to right: Masoud Pezeshkian, Gholam-Hossein Mohseni-Eje'i and Alireza Arafi
- Type: Interim supreme authority during vacancy of the Supreme Leader; Commander-in-chief of the Islamic Republic of Iran Armed Forces (5 – 8 March 2026) (Note: Also during vacancy of the Supreme Leader.); Supervisor of the three branches of the state (the Judiciary, the Legislature, and the Executive)
- Seat: Tehran
- Appointer: Expediency Discernment Council (Note: The Expediency Discernment Council only appoints one of the members. It also gave the body expanded powers.)
- Term length: Until a new Supreme Leader is appointed
- Constituting instrument: Constitution of the Islamic Republic of Iran per Chapter VIII Article 111
- Formation: 1 March 2026 (First council)
- Abolished: 8 March 2026 (First council)
- Succession: Supreme Leader

The Interim Leadership Council (Note: Persian: شورای انتقالی رهبری, romanized: Šurâ-ye Enteqâli-ye Rahbari. "Shura" is the term for collective decision-making in Islam.) is a body that temporarily handles the duties of the supreme leader of Iran when the office is vacant. The council consists of the president of Iran, the chief justice of Iran, and a member of the Guardian Council selected by the Expediency Discernment Council.

The council's first and so far only composition acted as supreme leader from 1 to 8 March 2026 following the assassination of Ali Khamenei. It consisted of President Masoud Pezeshkian, Chief Justice Gholam-Hossein Mohseni-Eje'i, and Ayatollah Alireza Arafi.

== Constitutional provisions ==
Article 111 of the Constitution of the Islamic Republic of Iran states:

Dismissal of Leader

If the Leader becomes incapable of fulfilling his legal duties or loses any of the qualifications referred to in Articles 5 and 109 or it is found that he did not possess some of the qualifications from the beginning, he shall be removed from office. Jurisdiction in this matter is vested in the Experts specified in Article 108.

In the event of the death, resignation or removal of the Leader, the Experts are responsible for designating and appointing a new Leader as soon as possible.

Until the new Leader is introduced, a shura consisting of the President, the Judiciary Chief, and one of the fuqaha of the Shura-ye Negahban [Guardian Council], selected by the Expediency Council, shall provisionally assume all of the duties of the Leader, and if during this period one of them is unable to fulfill the duties for any reason, another person shall be appointed in his place, while maintaining the majority of the fuqaha (in the shura).

This council shall act with respect to the duties referred to in Paragraphs 1, 3, 5, and 10 and Sections (iv), (v), and (vi) of Paragraph 6 of Article 110, upon the approval of three-fourths of the members of the Expediency Council. Whenever the Leader, due to his illness or any other event, temporarily becomes unable to perform the duties of leadership, the council mentioned in this Article shall assume his duties during that time.

== History ==
=== Formation proposal (1989) ===
After the death of Ruhollah Khomeini, the Assembly of Experts discussed whether to install an Interim Leadership Council or an individual person; 45 members voted in favor of an individual, while 23 preferred a leadership council. Then-president Ali Khamenei was then elected acting supreme leader.

=== First composition (2026) ===
Following Khamenei's assassination on 28 February 2026 at the beginning of the Iran war, an Interim Leadership Council was established under the terms of the constitution on 1 March, as announced by the secretary of the Supreme National Security Council, Ali Larijani. The Assembly of Experts named Alireza Arafi to serve as the council's jurist member. The other two members, president Masoud Pezeshkian and chief justice Gholam-Hossein Mohseni-Eje'i, became members of the council ex officio.

Though the death of Khamenei was long anticipated and was expected to destabilize the regime, the turmoil was predicted to intensify due to the "vastly diminished popularity and perhaps support" for the regime among the Iranian military, as well as the presence of various contenders for this position of power in Iran. The regime was weakened due to the "deep simmering anger" Iranians felt towards their government in the aftermath of the overwhelming violence it used to suppress the protests, the Israeli-US attacks, which Iranian civilians reportedly "eagerly anticipated", and the death of Khamenei, which caused celebrations to break out in Tehran and other Iranian cities.

The appointment of a new Supreme Leader has been described by Suzanne Maloney, vice president of the Brookings Institution, as necessarily "improvisational" and "dictated by the context of the moment"; and, as experts warned that "a smooth process is nearly impossible," her expectation was that the temporary council would remain permanent. On 8 March, Assembly of Experts members Ahmad Alamulhuda, Mahdi Mirbaqiri, and Mohsen Heidari Alekasir all stated that a choice of successor had effectively already been made, but differed in their views about the certainty of the procedure. Alamolhoda said that any change to the decision was constitutionally forbidden, and that the delay was in waiting for Hashem Hosseini Bushehri to formally make the announcement. Mirbaqiri said that "some obstacles regarding the process [still needed] to be resolved". Alekasir said that security risks were preventing an in-person meeting for the formal decision. The election of Khamenei's son Mojtaba as supreme leader was announced on the same day.

==== Members ====
Name	Portrait	Position	Party/Grouping (Faction)	Ref.
Masoud Pezeshkian: (born 1954); age 71		President of Iran (since 2024); Member of the Islamic Consultative Assembly (since 2008)	Independent (Reformist)	
Gholam-Hossein Mohseni-Eje'i: (born 1956); age 69		Chief Justice of Iran (since 2021); Member of the Temporary Presidential Council (2024)	Society of Seminary Teachers of Qom (Principlist)	
Alireza Arafi: (born 1959); age c. 66–67		Second Deputy Chairman of the Assembly of Experts (since 2024); Member of the Guardian Council (since 2019)	Independent (Principlist)	

- Masoud Pezeshkian is viewed as a reformist, and took office as the President of the Islamic Republic in 2024. The president is the second-highest-ranking official in Iran and is responsible for the implementation of the Supreme Leader's decrees, daily administration, and economic policy. Pezeshkian campaigned on economic stability, the easing of social restrictions, and diplomacy abroad. When the 2025–2026 protests over the rising cost of living began, he initially promised to address the concerns of Iranian business leaders; however the protests were ultimately brutally crushed by security forces and thousands were killed. Amid the deadly crackdown, US President Trump threatened to intervene on behalf of the protesters and negotiations between Pezeshkian and Trump failed.
- Gholam-Hossein Mohseni-Eje'i is a hardliner and an ultra-conservative Chief Justice, appointed by Khamenei in 2021. He is Iran's top judicial authority and has held various senior government positions in the past. He is known for his harsh sentencing and has been sanctioned by Canada, the US, Switzerland, the European Union, and others for Human Rights abuses. According to the Human Rights organization Faces of Crime, as the Minister of Intelligence and Prosecutor General he "has been instrumental in suppressing, torturing, and obtaining forced confessions from protesters against the 2009 presidential election results". He is considered one of the major figures responsible for the violent suppression of the nationwide protests of 2025–2026. Mohsen-Ejei was one of the candidates for the position of the new Supreme Leader.
- Alireza Arafi, head of Iranian religious seminaries and a member of the Guardian Council, a legislative body which ensures compliance with Sharia law and vets presidential candidates, is also a member of the Assembly of Experts, which will appoint the successor to Khamenei. Between 2009 and 2018, Arafi stood at the head of the Almostafa Institute for the "spreading the ideology of Islamic Republic" and "spreading Shia Islam." According to IranWire, Arafi is a "prominent hardline cleric" and is widely considered a "staunch loyalist to the core ideology of the Islamic Republic." Like Mohsen-Ejei, Arafi is a potential successor to Khamenei as Supreme Leader; however he is seen as being more stringent than Khamenei on cultural issues like the compulsory hijab, and he advocates for the full implementation of Shiite Islamic law. After Khamenei's death in the Iran conflict, misinformation, including an online post by US General Michael Flynn, circulated on social media platforms claiming that Arafi died in the strikes on Iran. Some Israeli media outlets also reported his death; however no government, including the US, Israeli, and Iranian governments, or international media outlet, has announced his death, and that he governed Iran along with the other members of the Interim Leadership Council between Ali Khamenei's death and Mojtaba Khamenei's election as Supreme Leader.

== See also ==
- Interim Presidential Council
