= Supreme Leader of Iran =

Highest political and religious office in Iran

Supreme Leader of the Islamic Republic of Iran
- رهبر جمهوری اسلامی ایران (Persian); Rahbar-e Jomhuri-ye Eslâmi-ye Irân
- Emblem of Iran

- Flag of Iran

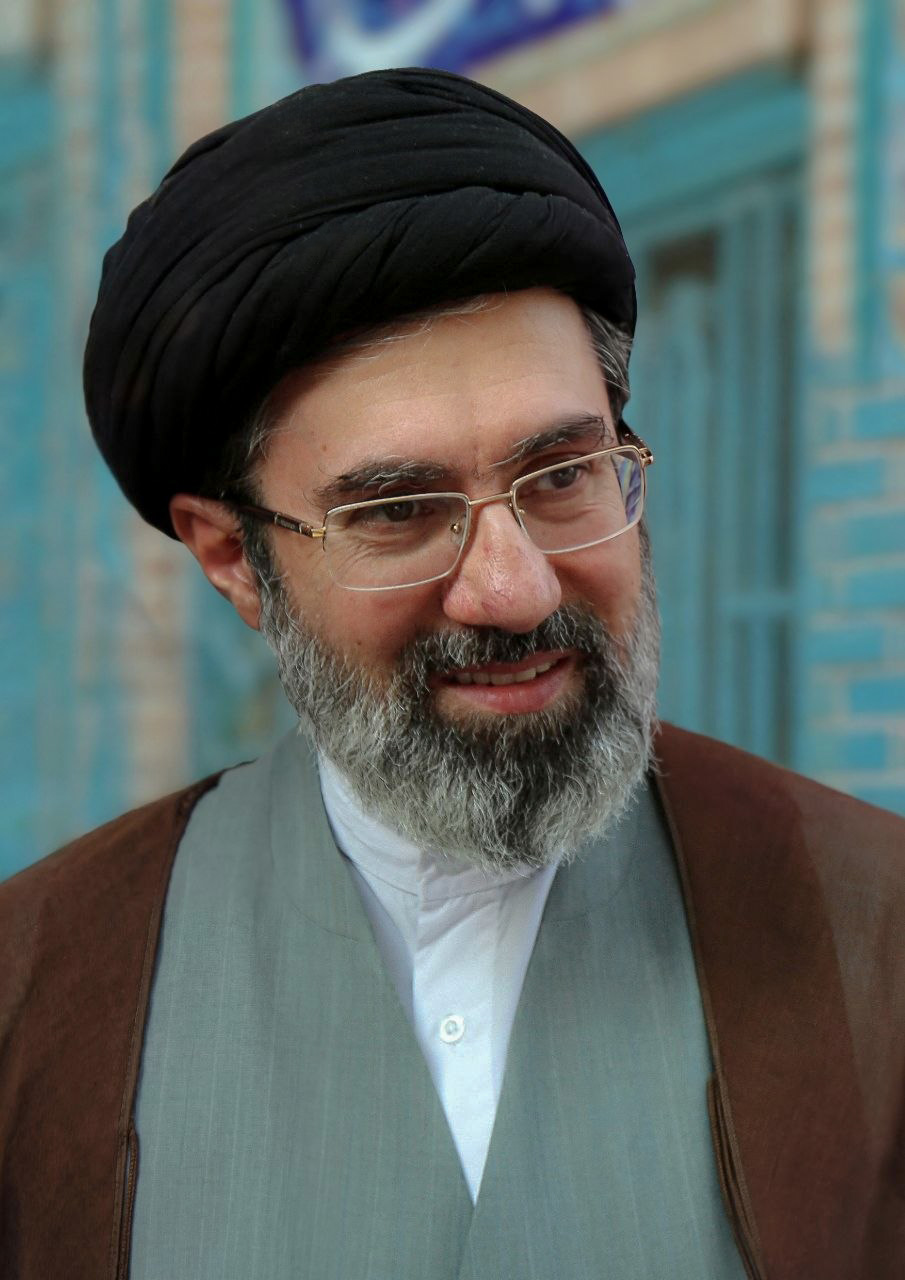
- Incumbent; Mojtaba Khamenei since 8 March 2026
- Office of the Supreme Leader
- Style: His Eminence
- Type: Head of state Commander-in-chief of the Armed Forces; Arbiter of the Legislative, Executive, and Judicial Branches of the State
- Residence: Jamaran Hussainiya (former); House of Leadership (former; destroyed)
- Seat: Tehran
- Appointer: Assembly of Experts
- Term length: Life tenure
- Constituting instrument: Constitution of Iran
- Formation: 3 December 1979
- First holder: Ruhollah Khomeini
- Succession: Interim Leadership Council if the office is vacant
- Deputy: Deputy Supreme Leader (1985–1989)
- Website: www.leader.ir

The supreme leader of the Islamic Republic of Iran, (Note: Persian: رهبر معظم ایران, romanised: Rahbar-e Mo'azzam-e Irân,.) (Note: The style of "supreme leader" is an honorific accorded by Iranian institutions and civil society to the marja' ruling the country. This custom is in keeping with Iran's state ideology, the Guardianship of the Islamic Jurist.) officially styled as the leader of the Islamic Revolution (Note: Persian: رهبر معظم انقلاب اسلامی, romanised: Rahbar-e Mo'azzam-e Enqelâb-e Eslâmi.) or the leadership of the Islamic jurist (Note: Persian: ولی فقیه رهبری, romanised: Vali-ye Faqih-ye Rahbari.) by the Iranian Constitution, is the head of state and the highest political and religious authority of the Islamic Republic of Iran. The supreme leader takes precedence above the president who is the country's head of government. The armed forces, judiciary, state radio and television, and other key government organizations such as the Guardian Council and Expediency Discernment Council are subject to the supreme leader.

The office was established by the Constitution of Iran in 1979 following the Iranian Revolution, pursuant to Ayatollah Ruhollah Khomeini's concept of the Guardianship of the Islamic Jurist. The officeholder is appointed for life. Originally the constitution required the supreme leader to be Marja'-e taqlid, the highest-ranking cleric in the religious laws of Usuli Twelver Shia Islam; however, in 1989 the constitution was amended and simply asked for Islamic "scholarship" to allow the supreme leader to be a lower-ranking cleric. According to articles 57 and 110 of the Iranian Constitution, the supreme leader supervises the activities of the legislative, judicial, and executive branches and delineates the general policies of the Islamic Republic. The second supreme leader, Ali Khamenei, issued decrees and made the final decisions on the economy, the environment, foreign policy, education, national planning, and other aspects of governance in Iran. (Note: Attributed to multiple sources:) Khamenei also made the final decisions on the amount of transparency in elections, and during his rule dismissed and reinstated presidential cabinet appointees.

According to the constitution (Article 111), the Assembly of Experts is tasked with electing (following Ayatollah Khomeini), supervising, and dismissing the supreme leader. In practice, the Assembly has never been known to challenge or otherwise publicly oversee any of the supreme leader's decisions, and all of its meetings and notes are strictly confidential. Members of the Assembly are elected by people in elections, and are approved the Guardian Council, whose members are appointed by the supreme leader or appointed by the Chief Justice of Iran, who is appointed by the supreme leader. The Islamic Republic of Iran has in its history had three supreme leaders: Khomeini, who held the position from 1979 until his death in 1989; Ali Khamenei, who held the position from Khomeini's death until his assassination in 2026; and Khamenei's son Mojtaba Khamenei, who has held the position since 2026.

== Terminology ==
The office is called by the Constitution as the leader of the Islamic Revolution and the leadership of the Islamic jurist. The style "Supreme Leader" (Persian: رهبر معظم, romanised: rahbar-e mo'azzam) is commonly used as a sign of respect although the Constitution designates them simply as "Leader" (رهبر, rahbar).

== History ==
=== Guardianship of the Islamic Jurist (Velayat-e faqih) ===
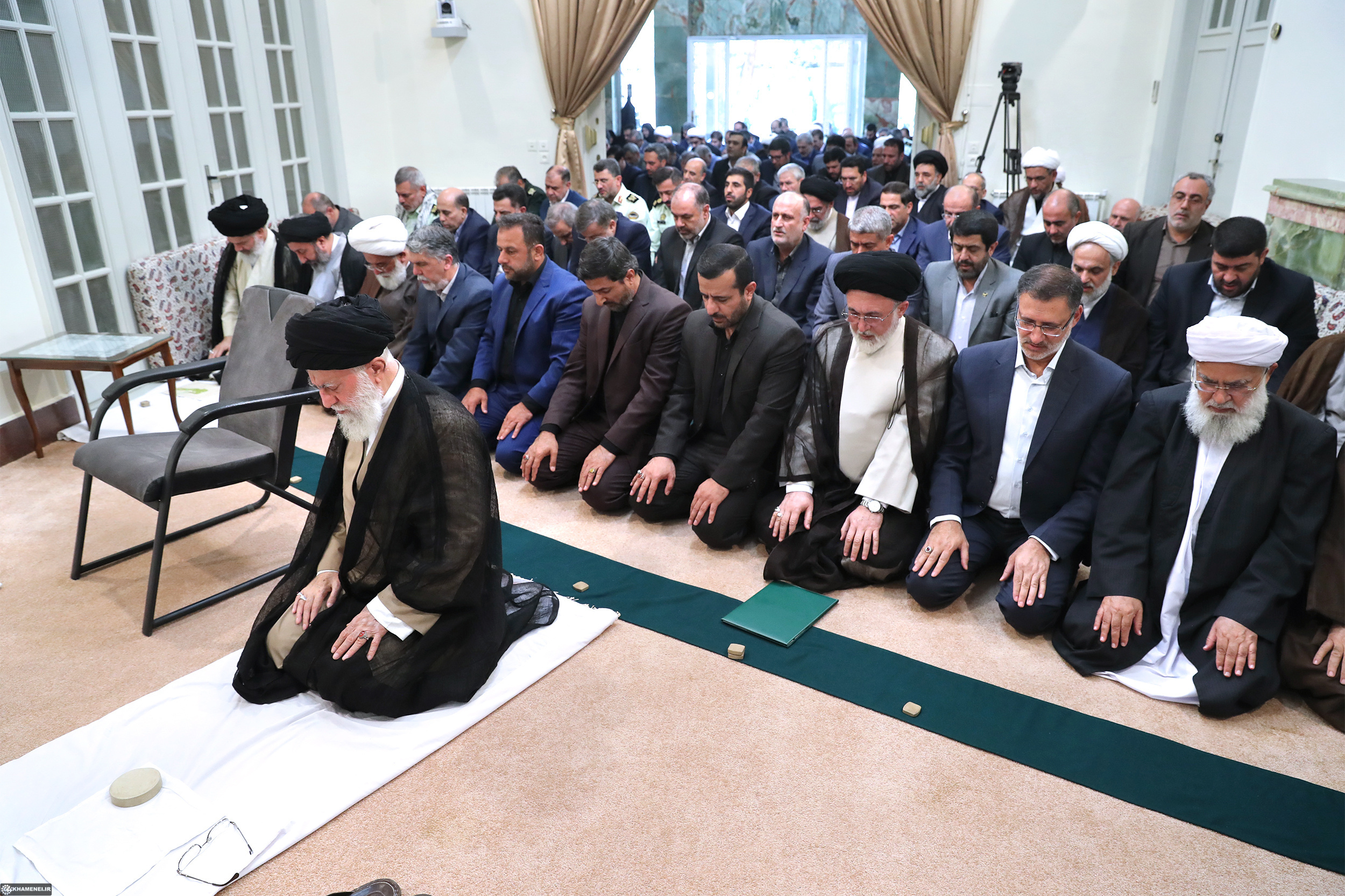
Ayatollah Ali Khamenei met with Hajj authorities, 2018

Ali Khamenei, second supreme leader of Iran, and his claim of "speaking with God"

The Constitution of Iran combines concepts of both democracy and theocracy, theocracy in the form of Ruhollah Khomeini's concept of vilayat-e faqih (Guardianship of the Islamic Jurist), as expressed in the Islamic Republic. According to Ayatollah Khomeini, the Guardianship of the Islamic Jurist was not restricted to orphans or mental incompetents, but applied to everyone in absence of the twelfth Imam. Jurists were the only rightful political/governmental leaders because "God had commanded Islamic government" and "no one knew religion better than the ulama" (Islamic clergy). They alone would preserve "Islamic order" and keep everyone from deviating from "the just path of Islam".

Prior to the revolution, observant Shia Muslims selected their own leading faqih to emulate (known as a Marja'-i taqlid) according to their own decision making. The "congregation rather than the hierarchy decided how prominent the ayatollah was" thus allowing the public to possibly limit the influence of the Faqih. After the revolution Shia Muslims, or at least Iranian Shia, were commanded to show allegiance to the current vali-e faghih, Guardian Jurist or supreme leader. In this new system, the jurist oversaw all governmental affairs. The complete control exercised by the Faqih was not to be limited to the Iranian Revolution because the revolution and its Leader had international aspirations. As the constitution of the Islamic Republic states, it

intends to establish an ideal and model society on the basis of Islamic norms. ... the Constitution provides the necessary basis for ensuring the continuation of the Revolution at home and abroad. In particular, in the development of international relations, the Constitution will strive with other Islamic and popular movements to prepare the way for the formation of a single world community (in accordance with the Koranic verse 'This your community is a single community, and I am your Lord, so worship Me' [21:92]), and to assure the continuation of the struggle for the liberation of all deprived and oppressed peoples in the world.

According to author Seyyed Vali Nasr, Khomeini appealed to the masses, during the pre-1979 period, by referring to them as the oppressed and with charisma and political ability was tremendously successful. He became a very popular role model for Shiites, and hoped for the Iranian Revolution to be the first step to a much larger Islamic revolution, transcending Shia Islam, in the same way that Vladimir Lenin and Leon Trotsky had wanted their revolution to be a world revolution, not just a Russian one.

=== 1979 ===
In March 1979, shortly after Ruhollah Khomeini's return from exile and the overthrow of Iran's monarchy, a national referendum was held throughout Iran with the question "Islamic Republic, yes or no?". Although some groups objected to the wording and choice and boycotted the referendum, 98% of those voting, voted "yes". Following this landslide victory, the constitution of Iran of 1906 was declared invalid. A new constitution for an Islamic state was created and ratified by referendum during the first week of December in 1979.

According to Francis Fukuyama, the 1979 constitution is a "hybrid" of "theocratic and democratic elements" with much of it based on the ideas Khomeini presented in his published book Islamic Government. In the work, Khomeini argued that government must be run in accordance with traditional Islamic sharia, and for this to happen a leading Islamic jurist (faqih) must provide political "guardianship" (wilayat or velayat) over the people. The leading jurist were known as Marja'.

The role of the Deputy Supreme Leader was eventually incorporated into the Authority of the Supreme Leader in 1985, with Grand Ayatollah Hussein-Ali Montazeri holding the office.

=== 1989 ===
Shortly before Khomeini's death, a change was made in the constitution of Iran allowing a lower ranking Shia cleric to become the supreme leader. Khomeini had a falling out with his would-be successor Hussein-Ali Montazeri, who disapproved of human rights abuses by the Islamic Republic such as the mass execution of political prisoners in late summer and early autumn 1988. Montazeri was demoted as a marja and Khomeini chose a new successor, a relatively low-ranking member of the clergy, Ali Khamenei. However Article 109 stipulated that the leader be "a source of imitation" (Marja-e taqlid).

Khomeini wrote a letter to the president of the Assembly for Revising the Constitution, which was in session at the time, making the necessary arrangements to designate Khamene'i as his successor, and Article 109 was revised accordingly. In this letter, he supposedly "emphasised that he had always been of the opinion that the marja'iyat was not a requirement for the office of leader".

== Election and succession ==
The supreme leader of Iran is elected by the Assembly of Experts, which is the only government body in charge of choosing and dismissing supreme leaders of Iran. The officeholder is elected for a life tenure. The Assembly of Experts is elected by Iranian voters to eight-year terms. All candidates for membership at the Assembly of Experts (along with candidates for president and for the Parliament) must have their candidacy approved by the Guardian Council. In 2016, 166 candidates were approved by the Guardians, out of 801 who applied to run for the office. In practice, Assembly has never questioned the supreme leader and has never been known to challenge or otherwise publicly oversee any of the supreme leader's decisions. Additionally, all of its meetings and notes are strictly confidential. Originally the constitution required the supreme leader to be Marja'-e taqlid, the highest-ranking cleric in the religious laws of Usuli Twelver Shia Islam. Since the 1989 amendments to the Constitution of Iran, any jurist of Islamic law can be elected Supreme Leader.

Article 111 of the Iranian Constitution provides that in the event of the removal or death of the supreme leader, a shura – known as the Interim Leadership Council and consisting of the President, the Judiciary Chief, and one of the fuqaha of the Guardian Council, selected by the Expediency Discernment Council – temporarily assumes the duties of the leader until a new officeholder is elected. The article was invoked for the first time following the assassination of Ali Khamenei in 2026, by which an interim council comprising President Masoud Pezeshkian, Chief Justice Gholam-Hossein Mohseni-Eje'i and Alireza Arafi of the Guardian Council was established pending the election of a new supreme leader.

== Functions, powers and duties ==
Supreme Leader Ali Khamenei at the head of Iran, an Iranian poster

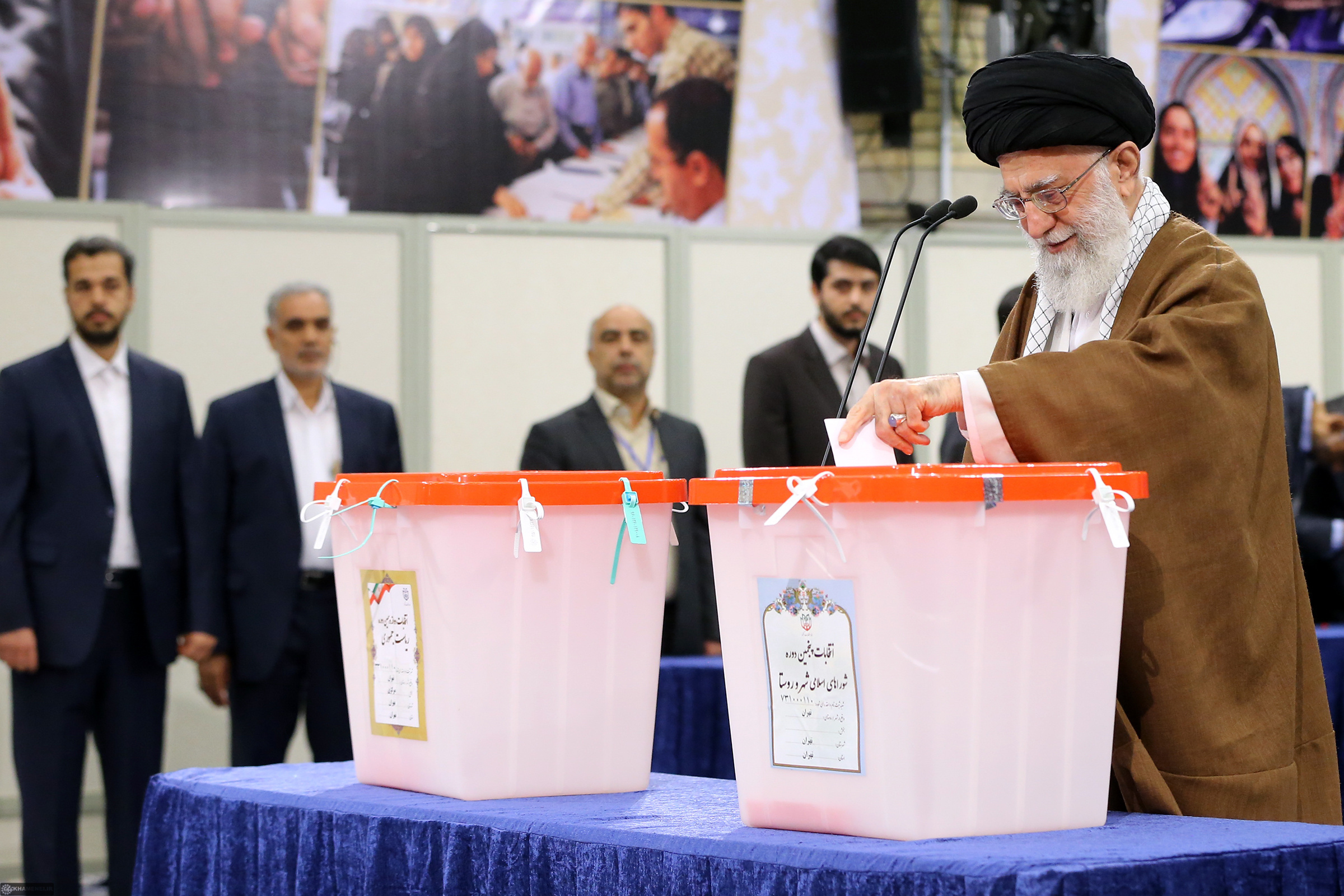
Ali Khamenei voting in the 2017 Presidential election

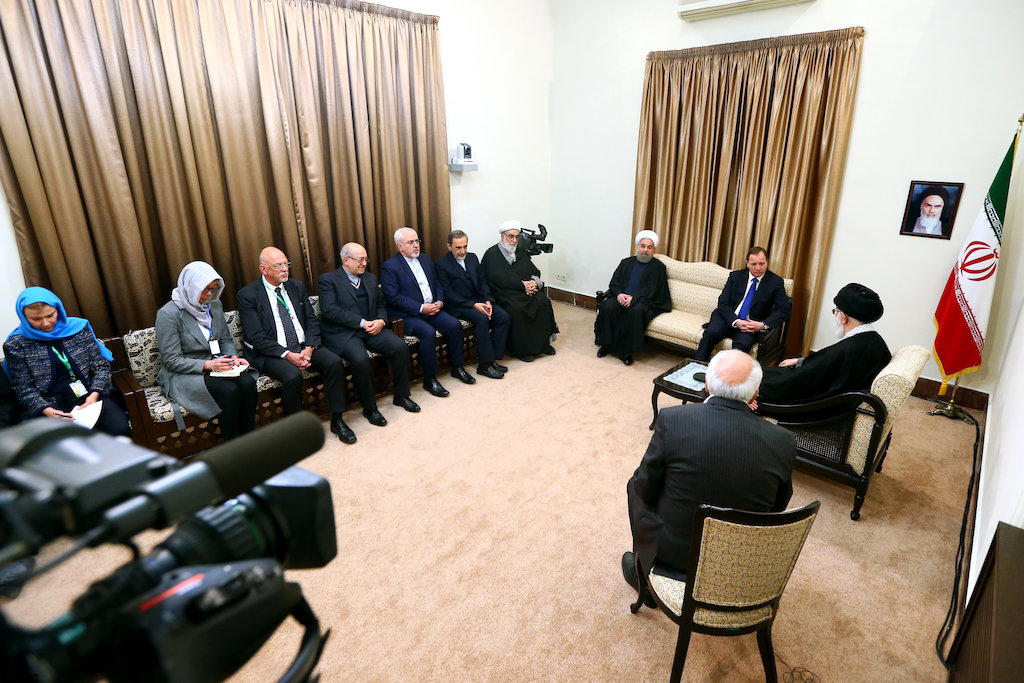
Ali Khamenei with Swedish prime minister Stefan Löfven, 2017

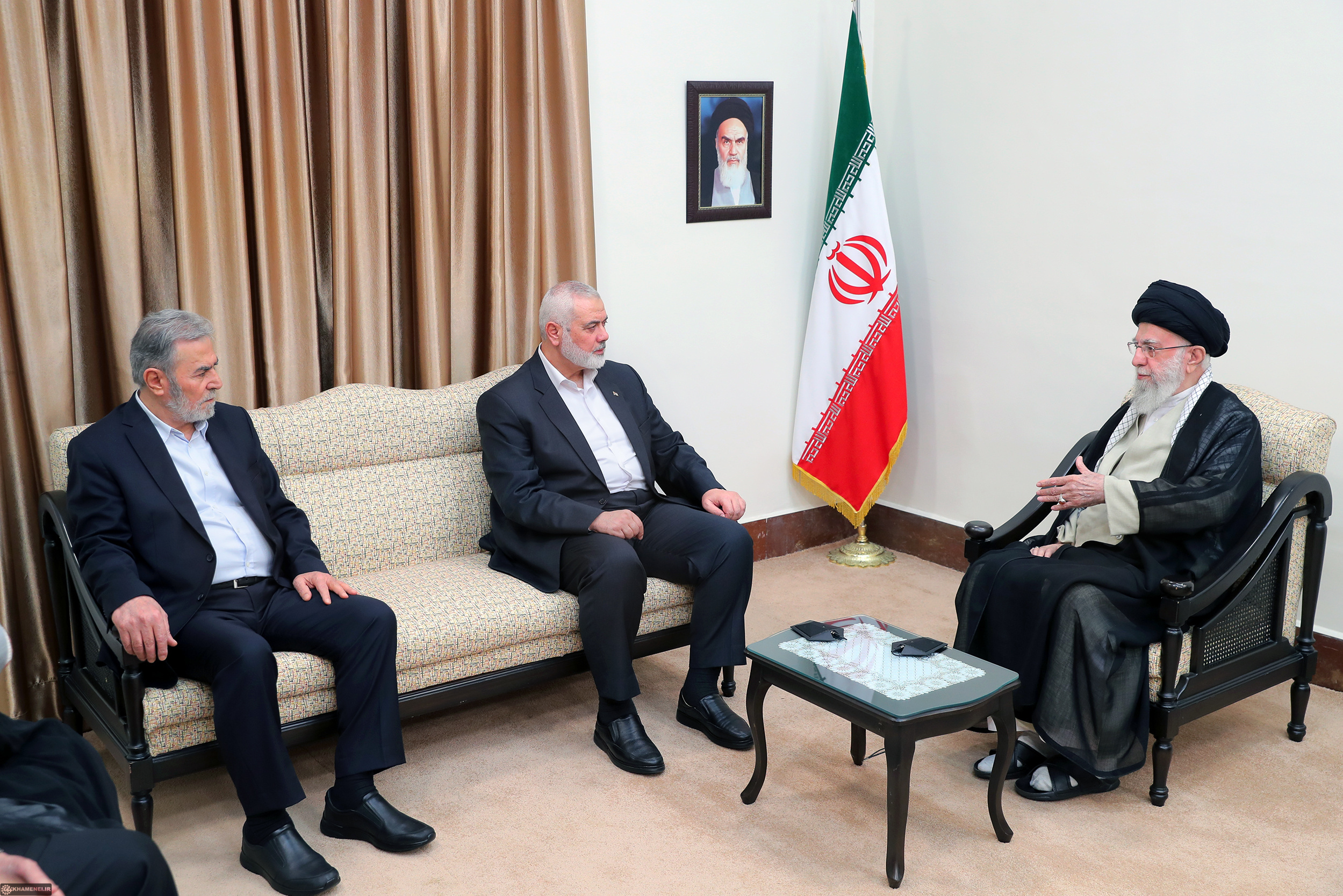
Supreme Leader of Iran Ali Khamenei meeting with chairman of the Hamas Shura Council Ismail Haniyeh and leader of the Palestinian Islamic Jihad Ziyad al-Nakhalah, July 2024

The supreme leader is the head of state and the highest political and religious authority in the Islamic Republic of Iran. The supreme leader takes precedence above the president who is the country's head of government. The supreme leader is the commander-in-chief of the Iranian Armed Forces and the supervisor of the three branches of the state, the judiciary, the legislature, and the executive. The Constitution stresses the importance of the clergy in government, with Article 4 stating that

all civil, criminal, financial, economic, administrative, cultural, military, political, and all other statutes and regulations (must) be keeping with Islamic measures;…the Islamic legal scholars of the watch council (Shura yi Nigahban) will keep watch over this.

and the importance of the supreme leader. Article 5 states

during the absence of the removed Twelfth Imam (may God hasten his reappearance) government and leadership of the community in the Islamic Republic of Iran belong to the rightful God fearing legal scholar (Faqih) who is recognized and acknowledged as the Islamic leader by the majority of the population.

Article 107 in the constitution mentions Khomeini by name and praises him as the most learned and talented leader for emulation (marja-i taqlid). The responsibilities of the supreme leader are vaguely stated in the constitution, thus any 'violation' by the supreme leader would be dismissed almost immediately. As the rest of the clergy governed affairs on a daily basis, the supreme leader is capable of mandating a new decision as per the concept of Vilayat-e Faqih.

Duties and powers given to the supreme leader by the Constitution, decrees and other laws are:

1. Delineation of the general policies of the Islamic Republic of Iran in consultation with the Expediency Discernment Council.
2. Supervision over the proper execution of the general policies of the systems.
3. Resolving conflicts between the three branches of the government
4. Issuing decrees for national referendums.
5. Supreme command over the Iranian Armed Forces.
6. Declaration of war and peace, and the mobilization of the armed forces.
7. Ability to veto laws passed by the parliament.
8. Appointment, dismissal, and acceptance of resignation of:
  1. the members of Expediency Discernment Council.
  2. the members of Supreme Council of the Cultural Revolution.
  3. two personal representatives to the Supreme National Security Council.
  4. Can delegate representatives to all branches of government. Ali Khamenei had around 2000 representatives.
  5. the six fuqaha' of the Guardian Council.
  6. the supreme judicial authority of the country.
  7. ministers of defense, intelligence, foreign affairs, and science.
  8. the head of the radio and television network of the Islamic Republic of Iran.
  9. the chief of the joint staff.
  10. the chief commander of the armed forces of the country
  11. the highest commanders of the armed forces.
9. Ability to dismiss and reinstate ministers.
10. Resolving differences between the three wings of the armed forces and regulation of their relations.
11. Resolving the problems, which cannot be solved by conventional methods, through the Nation's Expediency Discernment Council.
12. Signing the decree formalizing the elections in Iran for the President of the Republic by the people.
13. Dismissal of the President of the Republic, with due regard for the interests of the country, after the Supreme Court holds him guilty of the violation of his constitutional duties, or after an impeachment vote of the Islamic Consultative Assembly (Parliament) testifying to his incompetence on the basis of Article 89 of the Constitution.
14. Pardoning or reducing the sentences of convicts, within the framework of Islamic criteria, on a recommendation (to that effect) from the head of the judiciary. The supreme leader may delegate part of his duties and powers to another person.
15. Confirms decisions of the Supreme National Security Council.
16. Control over Special Clerical Court.

He oversees, appoints, or inaugurates, and can dismiss the following offices:

Organization	Branches	Activity	Ref.
Supreme National Security Council (SNSC)		Two personal representative. Body for national security and foreign policy discussions, including nuclear policy.	
Islamic Republic of Iran Armed Forces	the Chief of the General Staff of the Islamic Republic of Iran Armed Forces; the Commander of the Islamic Republic of Iran Army; the Commander of the Islamic Republic of Iran Navy; the Commander of the Islamic Republic of Iran Air Force; the Commander of the Islamic Republic of Iran Air Defense Force; the Commander of the Islamic Revolutionary Guard Corps; the Commander of the Islamic Revolutionary Guard Corps Ground Forces; the Commander of the Islamic Revolutionary Guard Corps Navy; the Commander of the Islamic Revolutionary Guard Corps Aerospace Force; the Commander of the IRGC Quds Force; the Commander of the Basij Organization; the Commander of the Police Command of the Islamic Republic of Iran	Iran's conventional military, also known as Artesh, is primarily focused on defending the country from foreign threats.; The IRGC was established to protect the revolution and is geared towards asymmetric warfare and less traditional duties of the armed forces.; The Law Enforcement Command is the uniformed police force in Iran.	
Chief Justice of Iran		Head of the Judiciary Branch (usually a member of the Assembly of Experts) for a term of 8 years	
Director of Islamic Republic of Iran Broadcasting		Irans national news broadcaster	
Supreme Council of the Cultural Revolution		Body that works "to ensure that the education and culture of Iran remains Islamic."	
Expediency Discernment Council		Set up to resolve conflicts between the Guardian Council and the Parliament. Also advises the supreme leader	
Head of the Foundation of Martyrs and Veterans Affairs		Nominated by the President and approved by the Leader.	

Additional information:

- Inaugurates the President and may also together with a two-thirds majority of the Parliament impeach him.
- The 6 Faqih members of the 12 members of the Guardian Council, the other 6 are chosen by the Parliament out of jurist candidates nominated by the Chief Justice of Iran who is in turn appointed by the supreme leader.
- Can delegate representatives to all branches of government, which as of 2018 were around 2000 representatives.
- The Imams of Friday Prayer of each provincial capital (with the advice of all the Marja') for life

Iran's regional policy is directly controlled by the Office of the Supreme Leader of Iran with the Ministry of Foreign Affairs' task limited to protocol and ceremonial occasions. All of Iran's ambassadors to Arab countries, for example, are chosen by the Quds Force, which directly reports to the supreme leader.

Members of the Guardian Council are half appointed unilaterally by the supreme leader. Half are subject to confirmation by the Majlis, after being appointed by the head of the Iranian judiciary (Chief Justice of Iran), who is himself appointed by the supreme leader of Iran. There have been cases where the Guardian Council repealed its ban on particular people, after being directed to do so by Khamenei.

The supreme leader is legally considered "inviolable", with Iranians being routinely punished for questioning or insulting him.

The supreme leader does not receive a salary.

== List of supreme leaders ==
No.	Portrait	Name (Birth–Death)	Term of office			Election	President(s)	Notes
No.	Portrait	Name (Birth–Death)	Took office	Left office	Time in office	Election	President(s)	Notes
1		Seyyed; Ruhollah Khomeini سید روح‌اللّٰه خمینی (1900–1989)	3 December 1979	3 June 1989 (Died in office)	9 years and 6 months	—N/a	List: Abolhassan Banisadr; Mohammad-Ali Rajai; Ali Khamenei	Leader of the 1979 Iranian Revolution, and founder of the Islamic Republic of Iran.
2		Seyyed; Ali Khamenei سید علی خامنه‌ای (1939–2026)	4 June 1989 (Note: Acting: 4 June – 6 August 1989)	28 February 2026 (Assassinated)	36 years, 8 months and 24 days	1989	List: Himself; Akbar Hashemi Rafsanjani; Mohammad Khatami; Mahmoud Ahmadinejad; Hassan Rouhani; Ebrahim Raisi; Mohammad Mokhber (acting); Masoud Pezeshkian	Previously served as President of Iran from 1981 until Khomeini's death.
3		Seyyed; Mojtaba Khamenei سید مجتبی خامنه‌ای (born 1969)	8 March 2026	Incumbent	8 months and 9 days	2026	Masoud Pezeshkian	Son of former Supreme Leader Ali Khamenei, elected amid the 2026 war.

== See also ==
- List of heads of state of Iran
- List of provincial representatives appointed by Supreme Leader of Iran
- Execution of Imam Khomeini's Order
- Constitution of the Islamic Republic of Iran
- Death and state funeral of Ruhollah Khomeini
- 1989 Iranian supreme leader election
- 2026 Iranian supreme leader election
- List of members in the Fifth Term of the Council of Experts
- Iranian Revolution
