= Alireza Arafi =

Iranian cleric and politician (born 1959)

Ayatollah Alireza Arafi
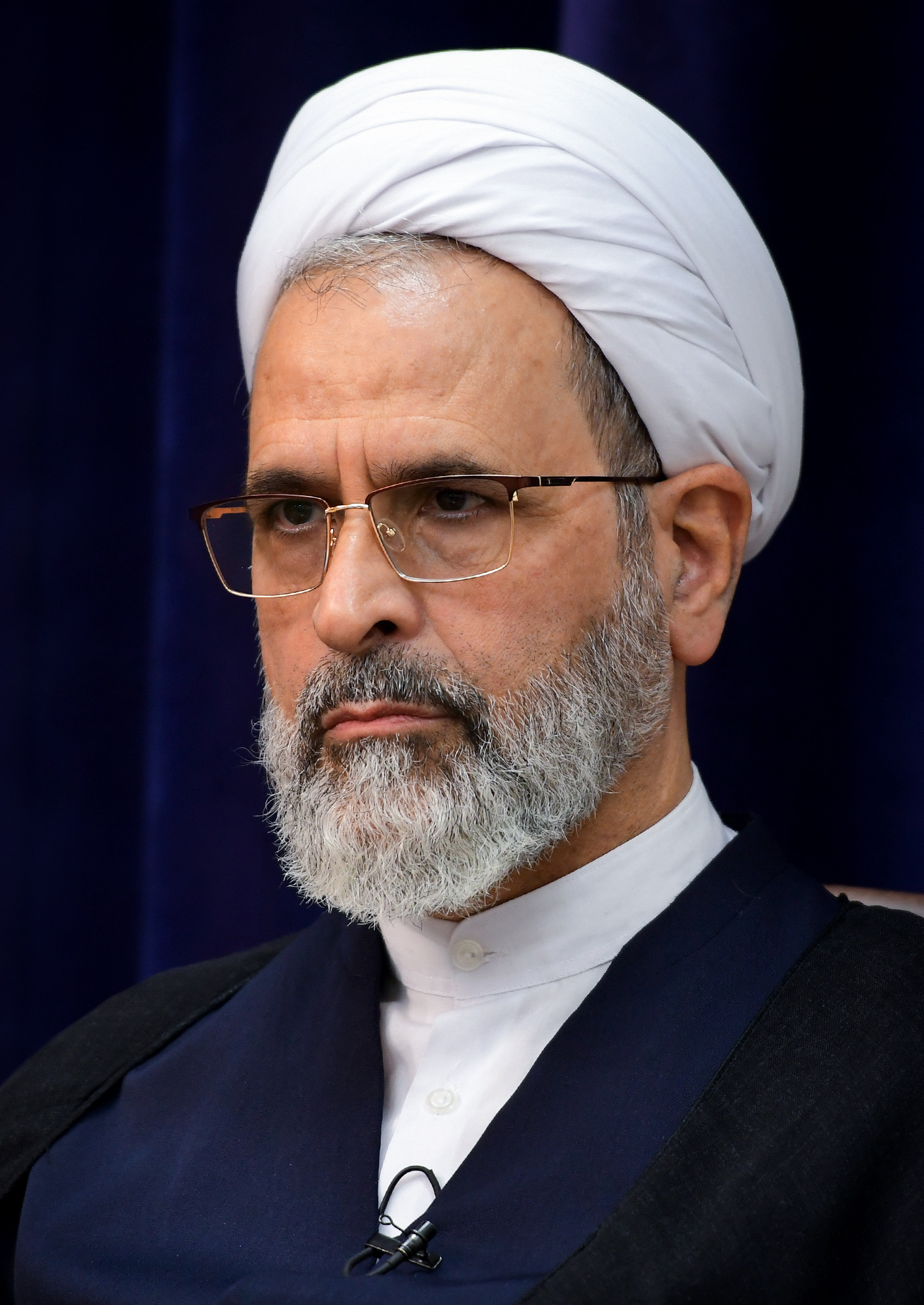
- Arafi in 2020

Member of the Interim Leadership Council
- In office 1 March 2026 – 8 March 2026 Serving with Masoud Pezeshkian and Gholam-Hossein Mohseni-Eje'i
- Preceded by: Ali Khamenei (as Supreme Leader)
- Succeeded by: Mojtaba Khamenei (as Supreme Leader)

Member of the Guardian Council
- Incumbent
- Assumed office 15 July 2019
- Appointed by: Ali Khamenei
- Preceded by: Mohammad Momen

Member of the Assembly of Experts
- Incumbent
- Assumed office 8 March 2022
- Constituency: Tehran Province
- Majority: 1,293,072
Additional positions
Head of Seminaries
Incumbent
Assumed office 2016
Appointed by	Ali Khamenei
Qom's Friday Prayer Imam
Incumbent
Assumed office 2015
Appointed by	Ali Khamenei
President of Al-Mustafa International University
In office 2008–2018
Succeeded by	Ali Abbasi

Personal details
- Born: 21 December 1959 (age 66) Meybod, Iran
- Website: arafi.ir

Religious life
- Religion: Islam
- Denomination: Twelver Shi'a
- Jurisprudence: Ja'fari
- Creed: Usuli

Alireza Arafi (Note: Persian: علی رضا اعرافی, pronounced [æˈliː reˈzɒː æʔrɒːˈfiː]; Kurdish: عەلی ڕەزا عەرەفی) (born 21 December 1959) is an Iranian Shia cleric and politician who has served as a member of the Guardian Council since 2019, and a member of the Assembly of Experts since 2022.

He sat on the Interim Leadership Council, alongside President Masoud Pezeshkian and Chief Justice Gholam-Hossein Mohseni-Eje'i, following the assassination of Ali Khamenei until the election of Mojtaba Khamenei as the new Supreme Leader of Iran. Arafi has been head of Iran's seminaries since 2016, and the Friday Prayer Imam of Qom since 2015. He was President of Al-Mustafa International University from 2008 to 2018.

== Early life and education ==
Alireza Arafi was born on 21 December 1959 in Maybod, Yazd, to a family of Lak-Kurdish origin but due to mixing he is mostly Persian Yazdi. His ancestors are said to have converted to Islam from Zoroastrianism in the 19th century. His father, Ayatollah Mohammad Ibrahim al-Arafi, was said to be a close friend of Ruhollah Khomeini; however, some analysts say that this might be an exaggeration.

Arafi completed his primary school education in Qom. Later, he also attended seminary courses, learned Arabic and English, and studied mathematics and philosophy.

=== Professors ===
His professors were Ali Meshkini, Muhammad Baqir al-Sadr, Kazem al-Haeri, Morteza Haeri Yazdi, Mohammad Fazel Lankarani, Hossein Vahid Khorasani, Jawad Tabrizi, Abdollah Javadi-Amoli, Morteza Motahhari and Mohammad-Taqi Mesbah-Yazdi.

== Clerical and political career ==
Before the 1979 Iranian Revolution, Arafi was a preacher and writer. His public profile increased after Ali Khamenei became Supreme Leader in 1989. In the years that followed, Arafi was appointed to a series of official positions. In 1992, at the age of 33, he was named Friday prayer leader of his hometown, Meybod, an appointment considered relatively early in his career. He subsequently assumed additional roles within Iran's religious and political institutions, including, in 2015, his appointment as Friday prayer leader of Qom.

Despite Arafi's lack of participation in the written test by the Guardian Council to participate in the Assembly of Experts, he was confirmed to the Assembly in the elections of 2015, thanks to the Article III of the Law regulating the Assembly of Experts elections in Iran, which allows a discretionary approval by the supreme leader of Iran to overrule the requirements of the Guardian Council.

In July 2016, Khamenei appointed Arafi, then 57, as head of Iran's seminaries nationwide. Three years later, in July 2019, Khamenei appointed him to the 12-member Guardian Council, a constitutional body responsible for reviewing legislation and supervising elections, including the approval of candidates for public office.

Following the assassination of supreme leader Ali Khamenei on 28 February 2026, during the 2026 Israeli–United States strikes on Iran, Arafi was named to a three-member Interim Leadership Council, which acted as the country's paramount leadership until the next supreme leader was elected.

=== Records and responsibilities ===
- President of the International Center for Islamic Sciences and a member of the board of trustees
- President of the University Research Institute
- Educational Department in Imam Khomeini Institute
- Research Council of Qom Seminary
- Friday the city of Meybod
- Member of the Supreme Council of the Cultural Revolution
- Seminary president of Iran
- Head of Al-Mustafa International University

=== Al-Mustafa International University ===
From 2009 to 2018, Arafi was the head of Al-Mustafa International University, a religious educational centre for "spreading the ideology of Islamic Republic" and "spreading Shia Islam". Arafi claimed that in eight years the institute had converted 50 million people to Shia, a claim regarded by many experts as "unbelievable and unachievable." As of 2020, Arafi said that around 40,000 non-Iranian seminarians were studying in Iran, and that a further 80,000 students had graduated from Al-Mustafa International University over the years.

=== Interim Leadership Council ===
On 1 March 2026, Arafi was appointed as a member of the Interim Leadership Council, which would take over Khamenei's responsibilities, in addition to his position in the Assembly of Experts, who will appoint the successor to Khamenei, and his candidacy to be that successor. According to Iran Wire, Arafi is a "prominent hardline cleric" and is widely considered a "staunch loyalist to the core ideology of the Islamic Republic." Arafi is the clerical representative of the council, unlike the other members of the Interim Leadership Council. Because of this, it is suspected that he might become the head of council.

After Khamenei's death in the Iran conflict, misinformation circulated on social media platforms that Arafi also died in the strikes on Iran, including an online post by US General Michael Flynn, the former National Security Advisor to President Donald Trump, in addition, some Israeli media outlets also reported his death, however no government, including the US, Israeli, and Iranian government, or international media outlet, has announced his death, and that he governed Iran along with the other members of the Interim Leadership Council between Ali Khamenei's death and Mojtaba Khamenei's election as Supreme Leader.

== Ideology ==
Profile of Alireza Arafi by Venezuelan television TeleSur (March 2026).

Arafi presents Islam, specifically Shi'a Islam, as possessing a comprehensive intellectual and civilizational framework capable of responding to modern Western philosophical, cultural, and political thought. In his speeches, he reportedly emphasizes what he describes as the moral and spiritual shortcomings of Western modernity, including secularism, liberalism, and materialism. He argues that Islamic scholarship offers an alternative epistemology and social model grounded in revelation and religious authority. He is also critical of other religions, particularly Christianity. Arafi is seen as being more stringent than Khamenei on cultural issues like the compulsory hijab, and he is an advocate of the full implementation of Shiite Islamic law.

Following Khamenei's assassination, Arafi stated in an interview that the war will follow the plan Khamenei designed before his death, ordering that in the case of war with the United States and Israel, Iran will cause regional chaos across West Asia, intending to press its Gulf neighbours into calling for an end to the attacks on Iran.

== Published works ==
Having attained the rank of mujtahid because of his expertise in Islamic jurisprudence and philosophy, Arafi has published more than 20 books and articles on these subjects.
