= Assassination of Ali Khamenei =

2026 assassination in Tehran, Iran

- Part of the 2026 Iran war
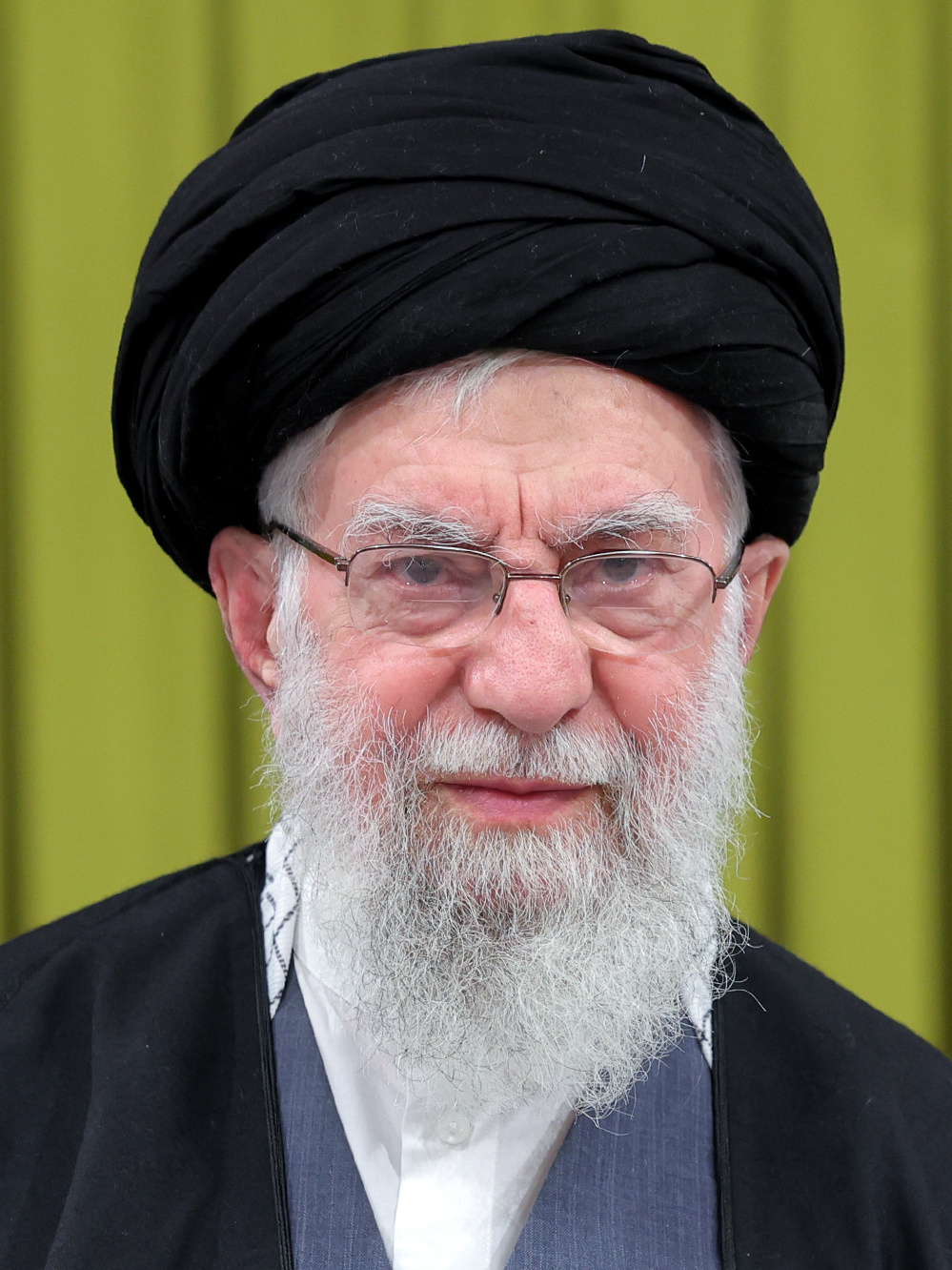
- Khamenei on 12 February 2026, 16 days before his assassination
- Location: 35.6919°N 51.3986°E; Tehran, Iran
- Date: 28 February 2026; 8 months ago
- Target: Ali Khamenei and associated Iranian leadership
- Attack type: Airstrike; decapitation strike; targeted killing
- Deaths: 5 (including Khamenei)
- Planned by: Israel; Mossad; United States; Central Intelligence Agency
- Executed by: Israeli Air Force Supported by: United States Air Force; United States Navy
- Outcome: Successful: Interim Leadership Council established the next day; 2026 Iranian supreme leader election; Mojtaba Khamenei succeeds his father as Supreme Leader of Iran

On 28 February 2026, Ali Khamenei, the supreme leader of Iran, was assassinated in Tehran as part of a series of Israeli airstrikes aimed at high-ranking Iranian officials. Khamenei's death was confirmed by the Iranian government on 1 March. His death occurred on the first day of the 2026 Iran war, as part of a wider joint operation by Israel and the United States using strategic locations intelligence from the US's Central Intelligence Agency to determine the whereabouts of several leaders. Satellite imagery suggested that Khamenei's residence in the city was severely damaged during the attack.

Following initial Israeli reports that Khamenei had been killed in the operation, US president Donald Trump and Israeli prime minister Benjamin Netanyahu stated that Khamenei was dead. After Iranian state media confirmed his death, the government announced 40 days of mourning and seven days of public holiday. The Fars News Agency announced that Khamenei's daughter, granddaughter, son-in-law and daughter-in-law had also been killed in the strikes. Despite an initial announcement that Khamenei's wife, Mansoureh Khojasteh Bagherzadeh, had died from her injuries on 2 March, Fars reported on 12 March that she was still alive.

Reactions to Khamenei's death in Iran were mixed. While many civilians went out to celebrate in the streets, thousands of others gathered in mourning. Protests against the 2026 Iran war occurred in multiple countries. Iranian diaspora members around the world participated in joyful gatherings.

A previous plan to assassinate Khamenei by Israel during the Twelve-Day War on 15 June 2025 was vetoed by Trump, according to unnamed US officials.

== Preparations ==
After the Twelve-Day War in June 2025, Khamenei became increasingly reclusive, and the bunker in his compound was so deep that its elevator took more than five minutes to reach it, making the opportunities to strike very rare. For months before the attack, the CIA had been tracking the locations and patterns of Khamenei and had learned that a meeting of senior officials was to take place with the attendance of Khamenei, so the strikes were planned to coincide with the meeting. Israeli officials stated that Khamenei was seen above ground at his conspicuous official residence shortly before the assassination.

== Airstrikes ==
The strike on Khamenei's compound was unique in that it was carried out during daylight, with Israeli jets targeting the site with thirty precision munitions, along with Sparrow ALBMs. Strikes targeted strategic facilities and important Iranian officials, including Khamenei's compound, which was among those most affected by Israeli strikes in Tehran; satellite imagery suggested that the building was severely damaged. At the same time, attacks were carried out in at least two other locations in the city to ensure the success of the operation.

Khamenei's bunker at the site, known as Habib Ebrahimi, constructed by the Islamic Revolutionary Guard Corps starting in 2009 as deep as 30 to 35 metres (98 to 115 ft) below ground, with a network of access and escape tunnels connecting to points across central Tehran.

== Initial reports ==
=== Conflicting reports ===
Following the initial strikes, several outlets, such as Axios and Iran International, citing Israeli government sources, began reporting that Khamenei was dead. An unnamed Israeli official said that Khamenei's body was located following the strikes, a photograph of which was reportedly shown to Israeli prime minister Benjamin Netanyahu. These reports around Khamenei's death were initially disputed by Iranian sources, with Iran's Ministry of Foreign Affairs spokesman Esmail Baghaei stating that Khamenei was "safe and sound", and Reuters reporting that Khamenei was transferred to a "secure location" outside of Tehran. Netanyahu stated that there were "growing signs" pointing to Khamenei's death. US president Donald Trump echoed these claims, calling the then-unconfirmed assassination "justice for the people of Iran". Following the statements by Donald Trump and Benjamin Netanyahu, Iranian news agencies Tasnim and Mehr once again stated that Khamenei was alive and still "steadfast and firm in commanding the field".

Shortly before midnight in Iran on 28 February, an unnamed Israeli official said that Khamenei had been killed in the air strikes and his body had been recovered and identified by intelligence sources. Netanyahu stated that there were signs that Khamenei might have been killed, though the Iranian foreign ministry contested his claim. According to Israeli officials, Khamenei's body was found in rubble.

On 2 March, it was announced on IRIB TV2 that Mansoureh Khojasteh Bagherzadeh, Khamenei's wife, had also died from injuries she had sustained in the strikes, however, the Fars News Agency, which is affiliated with the Islamic Revolutionary Guard Corps (IRGC), reported on 12 March that she was still alive.

=== Confirmation ===
Early on 1 March, the Iranian Supreme National Security Council, as well as Iranian state media, including the Islamic Republic of Iran Broadcasting, announced that Khamenei had been killed, despite previous steadfast denial. The state declared 40 days of mourning and a seven-day national holiday. The Fars News Agency reported that Khamenei's daughter Boshra Khamenei, her daughter Zahra Mohammadi Golpayegani, Khamenei's son-in-law Mesbah Bagheri Kani, and daughter-in-law Zahra Haddad-Adel, were also killed in the strikes on his compound.

== Aftermath ==
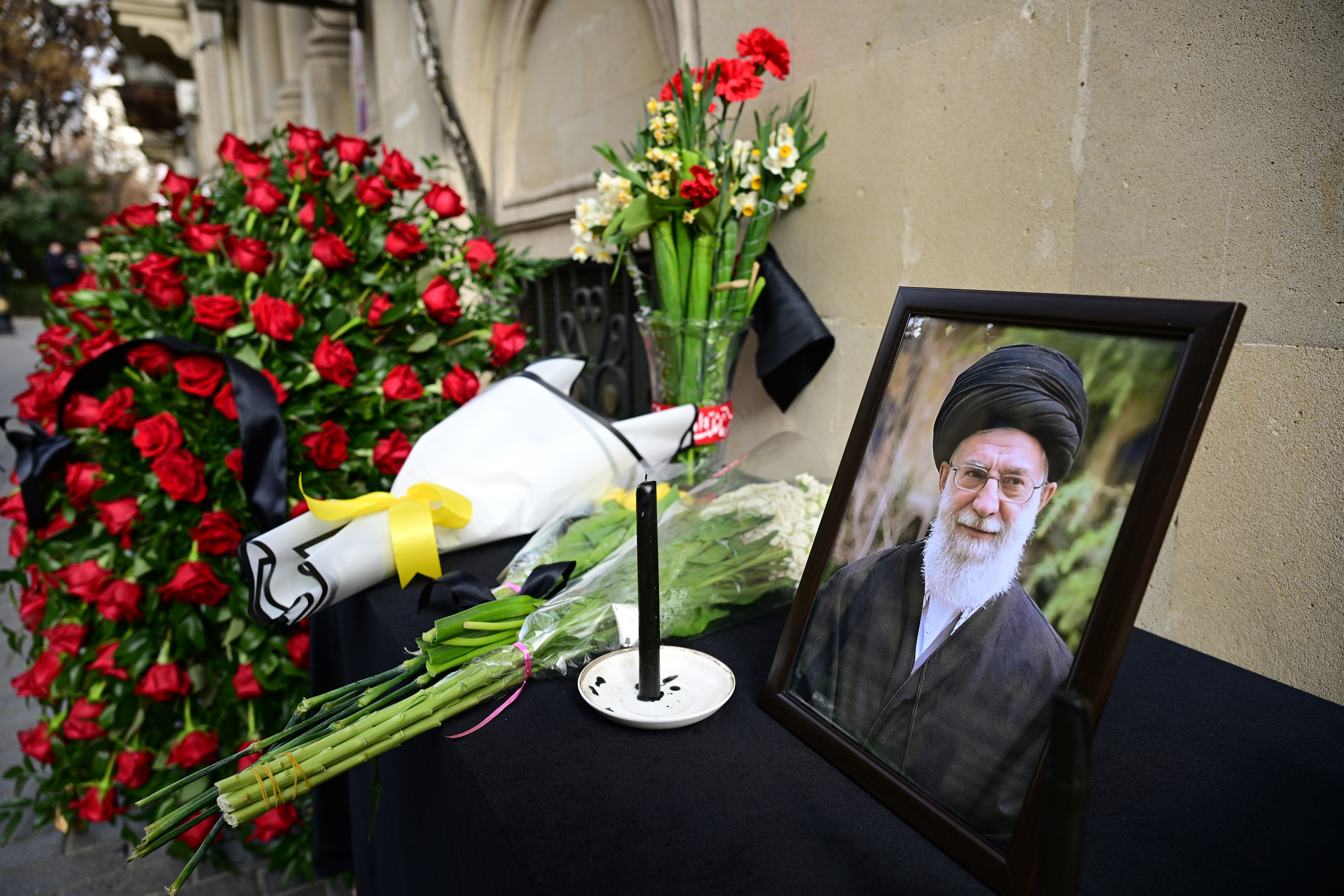
Tribute to Khamenei in the Iranian embassy of Baku

As the position of Supreme Leader is appointed by the Assembly of Experts and the position of Deputy Supreme Leader was abolished in 1989, Khamenei had no officially appointed successor. At Khamenei's funeral, it was announced that the Interim Leadership Council would include member of the Assembly of Experts Alireza Arafi, President Masoud Pezeshkian, and Chief Justice Gholam-Hossein Mohseni-Ejei. The IRGC was insistent on appointing a permanent leader swiftly. On 3 March, Fars said they were at the "final stages" of choosing a new supreme leader. Mojtaba Khamenei, the son of Ayatollah Ali Khamenei, was appointed by the Assembly of Experts on 8 March 2026.

On 9 April, commemoratory processions began at 9:30 a.m. IRST, the exact time of Khamenei's assassination on 28 February. Some foreign media outlets, such as South Korea's The Chosun Daily, noted that new Supreme Leader Mojtaba Khamenei did not appear at the main memorial service, citing reports of possible health complications. AFP coverage remarked that at the 40-day commemoration, a funeral had yet to be held for Ali Khamenei.

The Organization of Iranian American Communities and other Iranian analysts have noted that the delay in Khamenai's burial indicates a crisis within Iran. Shiite Muslims are supposed to be buried for the sacred fortieth day in connection with the Arba'in.

=== Funeral arrangements ===
The state funeral of Ali Khamenei was to take place in Tehran and Mashhad during the three days between 4–6 March 2026 but it was postponed. The funeral arrangements for Ali Khamenei are reported to be scheduled between 4 and 9 July 2026 across Iran and Iraq. According to Press TV, the ceremonies in Tehran are expected to begin at the Imam Khomeini Mosalla on 4 and 5 July, followed by a public procession through the city streets on 6 July. A further procession is planned in the holy city of Qom on 7 July.Reports also suggest that part of the funeral proceedings will take place in Iraq on 8 July, including processions in Najaf and Karbala before the body is returned to Iran. The final stage is expected to be held in Mashhad on 9 July 2026, where he will be buried at the Imam Reza shrine.

== Reactions ==
=== Domestic ===
==== Government ====
Iranian president Masoud Pezeshkian described the killing as a "great crime" and said that it would not go unanswered.

==== Civilians ====
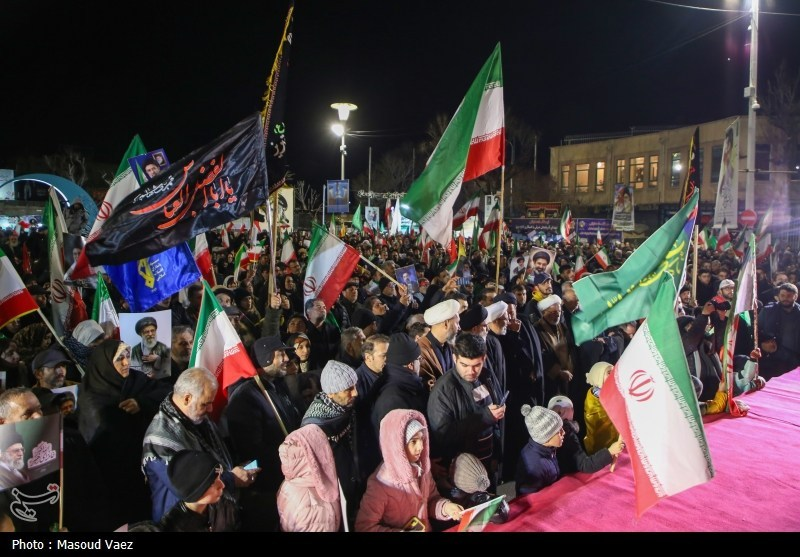
Pro-government Iranians in Tabriz on 18 March 2026 display portraits of the deceased Khamenei to demonstrate solidarity amid intense national polarization.

Civilian reaction from Iranians to his death were mixed. As his death was confirmed, some Iranian civilians went out to celebrate in the streets. Following the initial announcements of Khamenei's death, celebrations were heard in the capital, and videos of celebrations in cities like Isfahan, Karaj, Kermanshah, Qazvin, Sanandaj, Shiraz, and Izeh circulated online. In Dehloran, people were filmed cheering as a statue of Khamenei was toppled. Security forces were also deployed to prevent an uprising, with footage showing them opening fire on celebrants in the streets.

Supporters of Khamenei mourned his death near the Imam Reza shrine in Mashhad; videos show several people crying and wailing as others appear collapsed on the floor in grief. Photos also show Iranians mourning his death while holding portraits of him in Enqelab Square, Tehran. Videos were reported showing thousands of people in Yasuj and Isfahan mourning his death, with similar scenes being reported in Shiraz and the province of Lorestan. The red Shia flag of revenge was raised on the Jamkaran Mosque.

In contrast, many Iranians inside Iran began pouring out into the streets in celebration as news of Khamenei's death broke out, with some celebrants being attacked and shot by deployed security forces.

==== Diaspora and opposition ====
Celebration rallies were also held worldwide by the Iranian diaspora after news of Khamenei's death.

Exiled crown prince Reza Pahlavi, eldest son of the last shah of Iran Mohammad Reza Pahlavi and a prominent dissident against the Islamic Republic regime, unilaterally declared the "end of the Islamic Republic" shortly following Khamenei's death. Pahlavi later said Khamenei's death is not "the end" and called on Iranians to overthrow the Islamic Republic by preparing for "widespread and decisive presence in the streets."

Maryam Rajavi, co-leader of the dissident group MEK, released a statement on her website hailing the death of Khamenei as the "end of religious tyranny" and the "collapse of the Velayat-e Faqih regime", calling for a transitional government that excludes mullahs and monarchists, and saying that MEK does not seek foreign intervention in Iran.

=== International ===
President Trump announces the death of Ali Khamenei at Mar-a-Lago on 1 March 2026.

Reports of Khamenei's assassination were followed by demonstrations in a number of countries across Asia, the Middle East, and Europe. Reactions varied by location: in some cities, people gathered for mourning rallies and protests against the United States and Israel, while in others smaller groups assembled to express support for the strikes. Reports of celebrations of Khamenei's death were censored in China.

Across the United States, hundreds of demonstrators gathered in cities including Washington, D.C., New York, Los Angeles, Atlanta, Chicago, and Boston, to protest the US–Israeli strikes.

In India, thousands nationwide joined protests in outcry. Prayer meetings and widespread demonstrations were organized by members of Shia Muslim communities in several states and union territories, including Delhi, Jammu and Kashmir, Ladakh, Uttar Pradesh and others. Some participants carried portraits of Khamenei and Iranian flags, and were condemning the attacks.

In Bangladesh, a demonstration organized by the Bangladesh Jamaat-e-Islami condemned Khamenei's killing and called for OIC intervention.

In Greece, over 1,300 protesters, rallied in Athens with banners reading "Hands off Iran."

In Baghdad, demonstrators attempted to approach the US embassy, leading to clashes with security forces.

Anti-war protests were held in Rabat, Morocco, while in Kano, Nigeria, Shia Muslims waved Iranian and Palestinian flags and decried US and Israeli actions.

In Pakistan, many condemned the strikes that killed Khamenei and expressed solidarity with Iran. The MMU and various communities launched widespread protests and three-day mourning periods in solidarity with Iran. Demonstrators gathered in major cities voiced opposition to the assassination and called out perceived government complicity. Some protests in Karachi and Gilgit-Baltistan escalated into clashes with security forces, resulting in casualties and prompting temporary curfews and military deployment.

Smaller anti-war demonstrations were also reported in South Korea, Spain, Turkey, and United Kingdom.

Many members of the Iranian diaspora held celebratory rallies worldwide amid the American–Israeli strikes on Iran and the death of Khamenei.

Reza Pahlavi urged Iranians inside Iran to prepare to resume protests as the Islamic Republic "collapses", called on the military and security forces to side with the public rather than the ruling government, and described US action against Iran as a "humanitarian intervention" while urging Trump to avoid civilian harm. Pahlavi proposed the Iran Prosperity Project, an initiative affiliated with the US-based National Union for Democracy in Iran (NUFDI), which outlines plans for the first 180 days of Iran's governance following the potential collapse of the Islamic Republic, including measures for economic stabilisation and institutional reconstruction.

Maryam Rajavi, the leader of the France–Albania based National Council of Resistance of Iran, which is the political wing of the People's Mojahedin Organization of Iran (MEK), announced the formation of a rival transitional government and rejected both the Islamic Republic and the Iran Prosperity Project on the social media site X.

=== Analysts ===
The Economist described the killing of Khamenei as an "enormous success" for the United States and Israel, noting that a comparable effort to kill Saddam Hussein during the 2003 invasion of Iraq had taken nine months. It also suggested Khamenei's assassination, framed within Shia concepts of martyrdom, may actually benefit the regime rather than weaken it. Harlan Ullman, chairman of the strategic advisory Killowen Group and adviser to the Atlantic Council has called assassination of Khamenei a "big mistake", writing that US has made him a "martyr".

Julian Borger of the Guardian warned of a "Libya-style collapse" where a fractured, multi-ethnic Iran leads to a massive security vacuum, leading to separatist movements and creating a refugee crisis for the West.

Dan Sabbagh pointed out in the Guardian two weeks after the assassination, that Iran has been preparing for a long war and that Ali Khamenei himself has been pressing subordinates to name four levels of succession in the expectation that he and others might be killed. Sabbagh wrote that Israel and the Trump administration did not seem to have fully anticipated what was likely to follow their initial strike.

The New York Times wrote that by killing Khamenei, Israel had "crossed a new Rubicon, killing the head of state of a sovereign country—something it had shied away from doing early in the war last June, according to two [...] Israeli defense officials." The Atlantic framed the killing of Khamenei as the culmination of a long internal decay, arguing that his regime's collapse stemmed less from foreign firepower than from rot within. According to Graeme Wood, "the best-planned defenses don't count for much if the people you trust to run them are ready to sell you out," casting Khamenei as ultimately undone by betrayal bred by his own system.

Iran International cast the killing of Khamenei as the long-awaited end of "the dictator a nation longed to see gone", framing his death as the closing of an era defined by repression, ideological rigidity, and mass bloodshed, especially the January 2026 massacre. In this telling, his assassination lands at a moment of profound internal crisis, with a hollowed-out system facing succession struggles, public fury, and possible collapse, making his death less a geopolitical shock than the culmination of accumulated domestic illegitimacy. In an article for The Atlantic, Karim Sadjadpour described Khamenei as a rigid guardian of a revolution increasingly disconnected from much of Iranian society, arguing that his anti-Americanism was rooted more in regime preservation than ideology. He concluded by noting the symbolic irony that, after decades defined by hostility toward the United States and Israel, Khamenei was killed in a strike by those same adversaries.

Some analysts argue that Khamenei's death may serve as a powerful symbol for Iran's leadership, uniting supporters and strengthening ideological commitment in the face of external attack. Ali Vaez of the International Crisis Group (ICG) observes that the Khamenei's assassination removes the most pragmatic decision-maker in the system, potentially closing the door on nuclear diplomacy and empowering less predictable hardliners.

Omani mediators have observed that prior to the strike, a peace deal was within reach including Iranian concessions on uranium stockpiles. The assassination is seen by some as a deliberate sabotage of these diplomatic channels. It has also noted that this could bolster hardline elements and reduce prospects for rapid regime change rather than achieving strategic goals for the US and Israel, and will contribute to further regional instability.

Some legal and policy analysts have criticized his assassination as a violation of international law and that it risks normalizing the deliberate killing of foreign leaders.

== See also ==
- 2024 Hezbollah headquarters strike – Israeli operation leading to the assassination of Hassan Nasrallah
- 2026 United States intervention in Venezuela – US operation leading to the capture of Venezuelan president Nicolás Maduro
- Assassination of Ali Larijani
- Assassination of Ismail Haniyeh
- Assassination of Qasem Soleimani
- Foreign policy of the second Trump administration
- Iran–United States relations during the second Trump administration
- List of assassinations by the United States
- List of heads of state and government deposed by foreign powers in the 20th and 21st century
- List of heads of state and government who died in office
- List of heads of state and government who were assassinated or executed
