= Gholam-Hossein Mohseni-Eje'i =

Iranian politician and Islamic jurist (born 1956)

Hojjatoleslam Gholam-Hossein Mohseni-Eje'i
- غلامحسین محسنی اژه‌ای
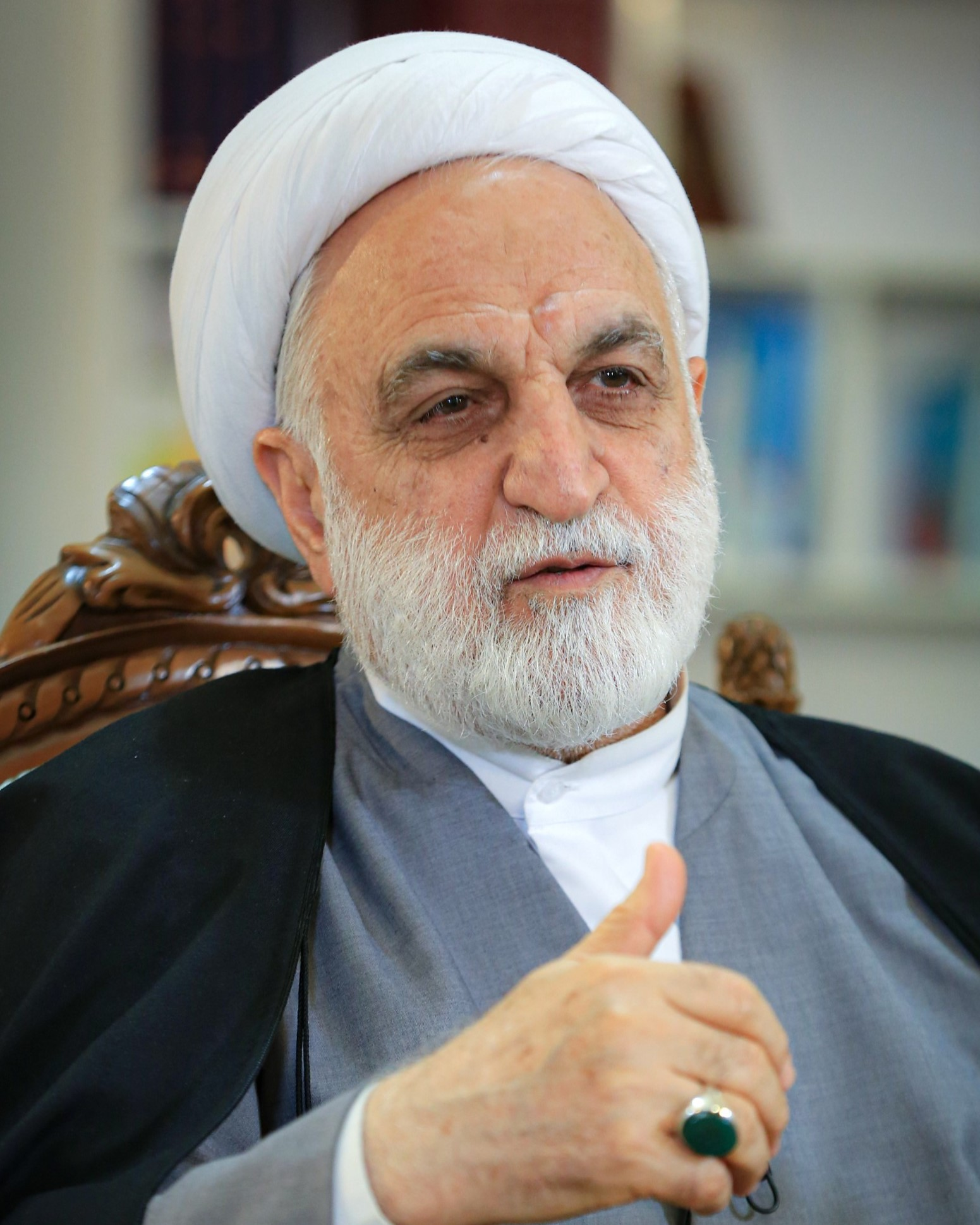
- Mohseni-Eje'i in 2023

8th Chief Justice of Iran
- Incumbent
- Assumed office 1 July 2021
- Appointed by: Ali Khamenei
- Supreme Leader: Ali Khamenei; Mojtaba Khamenei
- First Vice: Mohammad Mosaddegh Kahnamoui; Hamzeh Khalili
- Preceded by: Ebrahim Raisi

Member of the Interim Leadership Council
- In office 1 March 2026 – 8 March 2026 Serving with Masoud Pezeshkian and Alireza Arafi
- Preceded by: Ali Khamenei (as Supreme Leader)
- Succeeded by: Mojtaba Khamenei (as Supreme Leader)

First Deputy to the Chief Justice of Iran
- In office 23 August 2014 – 1 July 2021
- Appointed by: Sadiq Larijani
- Preceded by: Ebrahim Raisi
- Succeeded by: Mohammad Mosaddegh Kahnamouei

Spokesman of Judicial system of the Islamic Republic of Iran
- In office 16 September 2010 – 8 April 2019
- Appointed by: Sadiq Larijani
- Preceded by: Alireza Jamshidi
- Succeeded by: Gholam-Hossein Esmaeili

Prosecutor-General of Iran
- In office 24 August 2009 – 23 August 2014
- Appointed by: Sadiq Larijani
- Preceded by: Ghorbanali Dorri-Najafabadi
- Succeeded by: Ebrahim Raisi

6th Minister of Intelligence
- In office 24 August 2005 – 23 July 2009
- President: Mahmoud Ahmadinejad
- Preceded by: Ali Younesi
- Succeeded by: Mahmoud Ahmadinejad (acting)

Personal details
- Born: 29 September 1956 (age 70) Ezhiyeh, Isfahan Province, Imperial State of Iran
- Education: Haghani Seminary

Religious life
- Religion: Islam
- Denomination: Shi'a

Gholam-Hossein Mohseni-Eje'i (Note: Persian: غلام حسین محسنی اژه‌ای, romanized: Ğolām-Hoseyn Mohseni Eže'i, Persian pronunciation: [ɢolɒːmhoˈsejn mohseˈniː eʒeˈjiː]) (born 29 September 1956) is an Iranian politician and Islamic jurist who has served as the 8th Chief Justice of Iran since 2021. He briefly served as one of the three members of the Interim Leadership Council in March 2026 following the assassination of Ali Khamenei before the selection of Mojtaba Khamenei as the next Supreme Leader of Iran.

Following the February 2026 assassination of Ali Khamenei, Mohseni-Eje'i served on the Interim Leadership Council alongside President Masoud Pezeshkian and cleric Alireza Arafi. The council's first and only composition acted as Supreme Leader of Iran from 1 to 8 March 2026.

He previously was the Iranian minister of intelligence from 2005 until July 2009, when he was abruptly dismissed. He was sanctioned by the U.S. State Department and the European Union for his role in repressing the 2009 post-election protests. The E.U. accused Mohseni-Eje'i of overseeing "the detention and torture of, and the extraction of false confessions under pressure from, hundreds of activists, journalists, dissidents and reformist politicians". He also held a number of other governmental posts since 1984.

== Early life and education ==
Gholam Hossein Mohseni-Eje'i was born in Ezhiyeh, Isfahan province, Imperial State of Iran, in 1956. He is a graduate of the Haqqani School in Qom where he studied theology, and one of his teachers was the ultra-conservative Mesbah Yazdi. He also received a master's degree in international law from the Haqqani School.

== Career ==
=== Early years ===
From 1984 to 1985, Mohseni-Eje'i served as head of the Iranian Ministry of Intelligence's Select Committee. From 1986 to 1988, he was the Representative of the Iranian Head of Judiciary to the Ministry of Intelligence. From 1989 to 1990, he served as head of the Prosecutor's Office for economic affairs. From 1991 to 1994, he held the post of Representative of the Head of Judiciary to the Ministry of Intelligence.

=== Special Clerical Court (1995–2004) ===
From 1995 to 1997, Mohseni-Eje'i was the Prosecutor of the Special Clerical Court of Tehran.

Mohseni-Eje'i was named by journalist Akbar Ganji as having personally ordered the killing of activist pro-democracy journalist Pirouz Davani. Davani was allegedly abducted by plainclothes officers from Iran's Ministry of Intelligence in August 1998, one of the 80+ Iranian intellectuals murdered in the 1988–98 Chain murders of Iran.

In November 1998 he succeeded Mohammad Reyshahri as Attorney General of the Special Clerical Court, pursuant to a ruling of Ali Khamenei.⁣ He was also the Special Prosecutor for the Clergy for two years.

One notable incident during his tenure at Special Clerical Court was when Mohseni-Eje'i attacked journalist Isa Saharkhiz, and bit his ear and shoulder, in May 2004 at a meeting of the Press Supervisor Board. Saharkhiz filed a complaint with the judicial authorities.

=== Minister of Intelligence (2005–2009) ===
Mohseni-Eje'i was appointed Iranian Minister of Intelligence on 24 August 2005, after securing 217 votes in his favor at the Majlis of Iran.

During the 2009 Iranian presidential election protests, intelligence agents under his command detained, abused, blackmailed, tortured, and coerced false confessions from hundreds of activists, journalists, dissidents, academics, and reformist politicians, according to the European Union.

He was in office until 26 July 2009, when he was abruptly dismissed. No reason was given for his dismissal. It was thought by some to be connected to his opposition to the appointment of Esfandiar Rahim Mashaei as first vice-president. President Mahmoud Ahmadinejad said his removal had been necessary, because the ministry needed huge changes.

=== Prosecutor general (2009–2014) ===
Shortly after he was dismissed as Iranian Minister of Intelligence, on 24 August 2009 he was appointed Prosecutor-General of Iran by the Head of Judiciary, Ayatollah Sadeq Larijani, replacing Ghorbanali Dorri-Najafabadi.

As a spokesman for the judiciary from 2010 to 2019, he was also a spokesman to the media and journalists.

In 2011, Women's Link Worldwide awarded him the International Bludgeon Award. It described him as “the most misogynist judge in the world.”

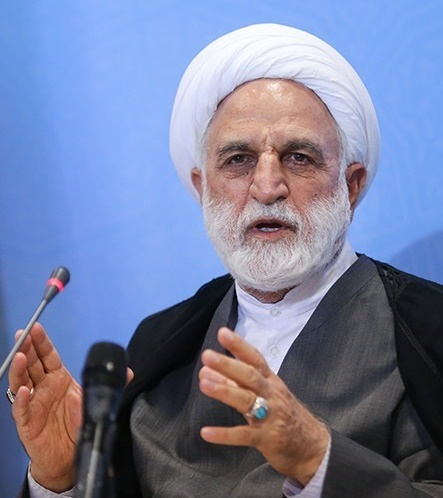
Eje'i, 2021

=== First Deputy Chief Justice (2014– 2021) ===
Mohseni-Eje'i served as First Deputy Chief Justice from 2014 to 2021. In 2016, he called the U.S. Iran's "No. 1 enemy ... the Great Satan."

=== Interim Leadership Council (March 2026) ===
Following the February 2026 killing of Ali Khamenei, on 1 March 2026, Mohseni-Eje'i was appointed a member of the Interim Leadership Council. The Council took over Khamenei's responsibilities, in addition to Khamenei's position in the Assembly of Experts, and appointed the successor to Khamenei. Mohseni-Eje'i served on the Council alongside President Masoud Pezeshkian and cleric Alireza Arafi. The Council's first and only composition acted as Supreme Leader of Iran from 1 to 8 March 2026, when Ali Khamenei's son Mojtaba Khamenei was elected the new Supreme Leader.

=== Chief Justice of Iran (2021–present) ===
Mohseni-Eje'i has served as the 8th Chief Justice of Iran since 2021. He was appointed to the role by Ali Khamenei and his position was reaffirmed in July 2026 by Mojtaba Khamenei.

In May 2023 he called on Iran's security and intelligence agencies to arrest women who flout Iran's mandatory hijab rules, and to hand them over to the Iranian judicial authorities for “severe punishment.”

As Chief Justice, Mohseni-Eje'i played a central role in suppressing the 2025–2026 protests in Iran. He directed prosecutors to show "no leniency" toward demonstrators, and encouraged swift executions of dozens of prisoners, widespread use of capital punishment, and the denial of due process, legal counsel, and fair trials for many, particularly young adults. Many death sentences were handed down within days of arrest, on charges like "moharebeh" (waging war against God) and "corruption on earth." Many of those executed had given confessions extracted under duress.

ISNA (the Iranian Students' News Agency) reported that in April 2026, during a ceasefire in the 2026 Iran War, Mohseni-Eje'i asserted that the U.S. had been "defeated in the 40-day battlefield".

== Activities and views ==
Mohseni-Eje’i is a hardline conservative. According to Stratfor, Mohseni-Eje'i is an Iranian Principlist, who was affiliated with hardline cleric Mohammad Yazdi.

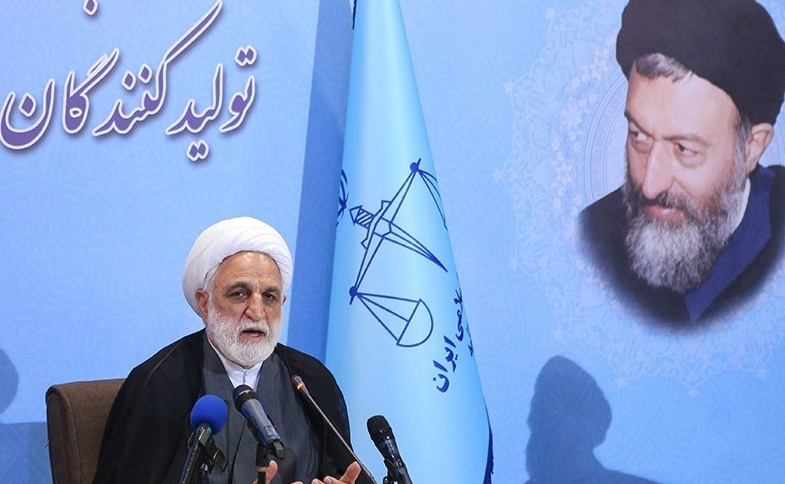
Eje'i in a meeting with economic activists, 2021

On 15 July 2009, Mohseni-Eje'i told reporters that his ministry might publicize confessions made by people held for weeks without access to their lawyers. Human rights activists raised concerns that "these so-called confessions are obtained under duress."

Mohseni-Eje'i supported the election of Mojtaba Khamenei as the new leader of the Islamic Republic of Iran in March 2026.

Mohseni-Eje'i has taught in the Baqir al-Olum College of the Ministry of Intelligence, in the educational department of the Islamic Revolutionary Court, as well as the Faculty of Judicial Sciences.

=== Sanctions ===
Mohseni-Eje'i is known for his harsh sentencing and has been sanctioned by Canada, the U.S., Switzerland, the European Union and others for human rights abuses. He was among several Iranian officials who were sanctioned in 2011 by the United States Department of State and the European Union for his role in suppressing the 2009 Iranian presidential election protests. The EU stated that:

while he was Intelligence Minister during the 2009 elections, intelligence agents under his command were responsible for the detention and torture of, and the extraction of false confessions under pressure from, hundreds of activists, journalists, dissidents and reformist politicians. In addition, political figures were coerced into making false confessions under unbearable interrogation, which included torture, abuse, blackmail and the threatening of family members.

== See also ==
- Chain murders of Iran
- List of Iranian officials

== Notes ==
Political offices
Preceded by Ali Younesi	Minister of Intelligence; 2005–2009	Succeeded by Heydar Moslehi
Legal offices
Preceded by Ghorbanali Dorri-Najafabadi	Prosecutor-General of Iran; 2009–2014	Succeeded by Ebrahim Raisi
Preceded by Ebrahim Raisi	Chief Justice of Iran; 2021–present	Succeeded by Incumbent
