= Government of Iran =

Government of the Islamic Republic of Iran
- Emblem of the Islamic Republic of Iran
- Formation: 1 April 1979; 47 years ago (Islamic Republic formed); 21 August 1980; 46 years ago (first Islamic Consultative Assembly session)
- Founding document: Constitution of the Islamic Republic of Iran
- Jurisdiction: Iran
- Website: irangov.ir

Legislative branch
- Legislature: Islamic Consultative Assembly
- Meeting place: Baharestan

Executive branch
- Leader: Head of state (de jure): Revolutionary Leader (1979); Supreme Leader (since 1979); Interim Leadership Council (2026); Supervisor of the three branches of the state (the Judiciary, the Legislature, and the Executive): Supreme Leader (since 1979); Interim Leadership Council (2026); Head of state (per UN): President (since 1980); Head of government: Prime Minister (1979); Chairman of Council of the Islamic Revolution (1979–1980); Prime Minister (1980–1989); President (since 1989); Acting Head of the Executive Branch: (Note: except in matters directly related to the Leadership) President (since 1980); Deputy head of government: First Vice President (since 1989); Commander-in-Chief of the Iranian Armed Forces: Revolutionary Leader (1979); Supreme Leader (1979–1980); President (1980–1981); Supreme Leader (since 1981); Interim Leadership Council (2026)
- Appointer: Assembly of Experts (Supreme Leader); Direct popular vote (President)
- Headquarters: Pasteur
- Main organ: Cabinet
- Departments: 19 ministries

Judicial branch
- Court: Judicial system of the Islamic Republic of Iran
- Seat: Courthouse of Tehran

The Government of the Islamic Republic of Iran (Persian: نظام جمهوری اسلامی ایران, romanized: Nezâm-e Jomhuri-ye Eslâmi-ye Irân) is the national government of Iran, which, per the Constitution of the Islamic Republic of Iran, is founded on the principles of Islamism.

Its constitution, adopted in 1979 by referendum, established a system combining elements of theocracy and republican governance. The constitution provides for separation of powers, among executive, legislative and judicial systems. The supreme leader of Iran serves as the country's head of state and commander-in-chief of the armed forces and holds ultimate authority over key state institutions, including the military, judiciary, and state broadcasting.

It is currently one of the three governments using the title Islamic Republic. Iran operates as a unitary state.

== Creation ==
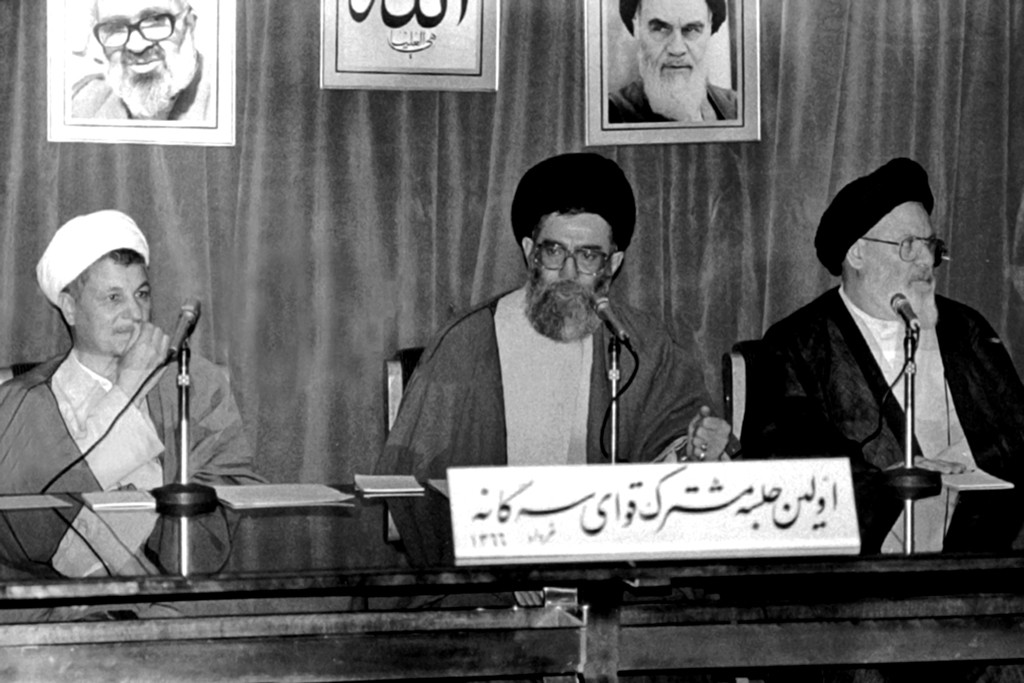
Joint Tripartite meeting of Iranian government, 2 June 1987. Speaker of the Parliament Hashemi Rafsanjani (left), President Ali Khamenei (middle) and Head of Supreme Court Mousavi Ardebili (right).

Throughout the middle of the 20th century, the Pahlavi regime introduced rapid secular modernization programs and aligned the country closely with Western powers. However, the royal government faced widespread domestic criticism from citizens angry about severe political restrictions, growing economic inequality, corruption, and the violent suppression of dissent by the secret police. The Islamic Republic of Iran was created shortly after the Islamic Revolution. The first major demonstrations with the intent to overthrow the Shah Mohammad Reza Pahlavi began in January 1978, with a new, Islam-based, theocratic Constitution being approved in December 1979, ending the monarchy. The Shah left Iran for exile in January 1979 after large strikes and demonstrations against him and his regime paralyzed the country. Ayatollah Khomeini would return in February of the same year after a long period of exile, greeted in the capital of Tehran by several million Iranians. The final collapse of the Pahlavi dynasty occurred shortly after on 11 February when Iran's military declared itself officially "neutral" after guerrillas and rebel troops overwhelmed forces loyal to the Shah in street fights throughout the country.

After the victory of the Islamic Revolution, a referendum was held by Interim Government of Iran on the 30 and 31 March 1979 (10 and 11 Farvardin 1358), asking people to vote either Yes or No to an Islamic Republic. The results of the referendum were announced soon after by Ayatollah Khomeini on 2 April 1979, with 98.2 percent of the Iranian citizens voting in favor of an Islamic Republic.

== The six committee ==
In September 2026 in his interview Pezeshkian revealed a new secretive unannounced council of six persons has surpassed to run the entire decision making in the country. Unofficially its membership reportedly includes since the 2026 war

Post	Current holder	Post	Current holder
Minister of Foreign	Abas Aaraghchi	President	Masoud Pezeshkian
Islamic Cunsultative assembly chief	MohammadBagher Ghalibaf	Chief of SNSC	Mohsen Rezaei
IRGC commander in chief	Ahmad Vahidi	Joint chairman of joint Chiefs of armed forces staff	Ali Abdollahi

== Constitution ==
On 2–3 December 1979, the Constitution of the Islamic Republic of Iran was ratified by a popular referendum. In this referendum, 99.5 percent of Iranian voters approved the constitution. Ten years later, in the summer of 1989, Iranian voters would approve a set of amendments to the Constitution of 1979 in another referendum. The constitution has been called a "hybrid" of "theocratic and democratic elements". While Articles 1 and 2 vest sovereignty in God, Article 6 "mandates popular elections for the presidency and the Majlis, or parliament". All democratic procedures and rights are subordinate to the Guardian Council and the Supreme Leader, whose powers are spelled out in Chapter Eight (Articles 107–112).

=== Principles ===
The Government of the Islamic Republic of Iran is officially a theocratic republic. Article 2 of the Constitution explains the principles of the government of the Islamic Republic of Iran:

Article 2

The Islamic Republic is a system based on belief in:

1. the One God (as stated in the phrase "There is no god except Allah"), His exclusive sovereignty and the right to legislate, and the necessity of submission to His commands;

2. Divine revelation and its fundamental role in setting forth the laws;

3. the return to God in the Hereafter, and the constructive role of this belief in the course of man's ascent towards God;

4. the justice of God in creation and legislation;

5. continuous leadership (imamah) and perpetual guidance, and its fundamental role in ensuring the uninterrupted process of the revolution of Islam;

6. the exalted dignity and value of man, and his freedom coupled with responsibility before God; in which equity, justice, political, economic, social, and cultural independence, and national solidarity are secured by recourse to:

1. Continuous 'ijtihad of the fuqaha' possessing necessary qualifications, exercised on the basis off the Qur'an and the Sunnah of the Ma'sumun, upon all of whom be peace;

2. Sciences and arts and the most advanced results of human experience, together with the effort to advance them further;

3. Negation of all forms of oppression, both the infliction of and the submission to it, and of dominance, both its imposition and its acceptance.

== Political structure ==
Political system of the Islamic Republic of Iran

=== Leadership ===
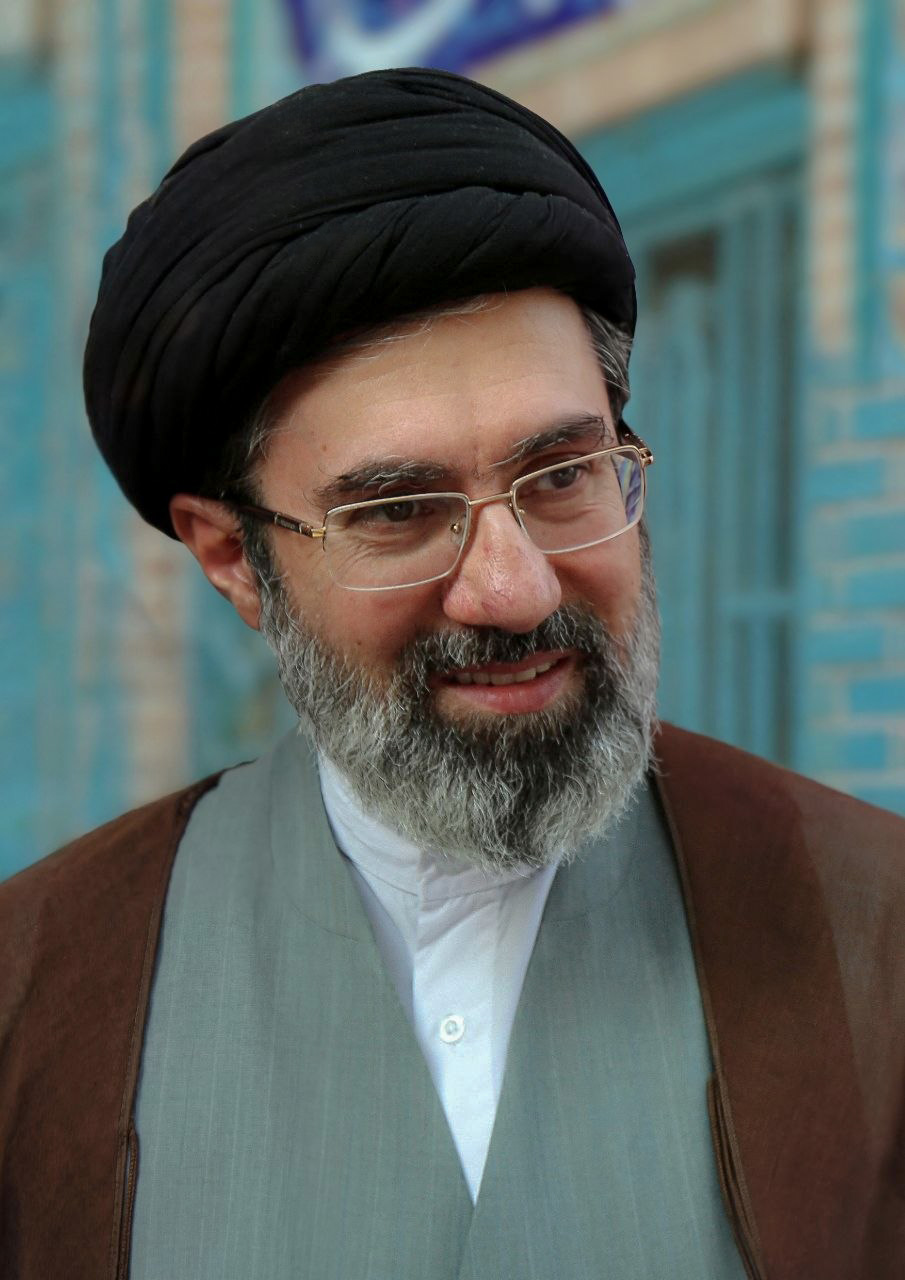
Mojtaba khamenei

The Supreme Leader of the Islamic Republic of Iran, officially called the Supreme Leadership Authority in Iran, is a post established by Article 5 of the Constitution of the Islamic Republic of Iran in accordance with the concept of the Guardianship of the Islamic Jurist. This post is a life tenure post. According to article 110 of the constitution, the Supreme Leader delineates the general policies of the Islamic Republic. Article 109 is about the Leadership Qualifications and Article 110 mentions to Functions and duties of the Supreme Leader. According to this Article he is the commander-in-chief of the Armed Forces. Also, according to Article 57 the Legislature, the Executive and the Judiciary system shall operate under the superintendence of Supreme leader. The Islamic Republic has had three Supreme Leaders: Ayatollah Ruhollah Khomeini, who held the position from Iranian revolution in 1979 until his death in 1989, Ayatollah Ali Khamenei, who held the position from Khomeini's death until his assassination in 2026, and Mojtaba Khamenei, who has held the position since his father's assassination.

==== Assembly of Experts ====
The Assembly of Experts, or Assembly of Experts of the Leadership, is a deliberative body of eighty-eight (88) Mujtahids. Members are elected by direct public vote for eight-year terms.

According to Articles 107, 109, and 111 of the Constitution, the duties of the assembly include electing and removing the Supreme Leader of Iran.

The most recent election was held on 1 March 2024, resulting in the formation of the Sixth Assembly of Experts. It convened for the first time on 21 May 2024 and elected Mohammad-Ali Movahedi Kermani as chairman.

=== Legislature ===
The Legislature of the Islamic Republic of Iran has two parts: the Islamic Consultative Assembly and the Guardian Council. The Articles 62-99 are about the Legislature of the Islamic Republic of Iran.

==== Consultative Assembly ====
Articles 62–90 of the Constitution of the Islamic Republic of Iran are about the Islamic Consultative Assembly. In Article 71, it is mentioned that the Islamic Consultative Assembly can establish laws on all matters, within the limits of its competence as laid down in the Constitution. According to Article 62, the Islamic Consultative Assembly is constituted by the representatives of the people elected directly and by secret ballot. Article 64 notes that there are to be two hundred seventy members of the Islamic Consultative Assembly which, keeping in view the human, political, geographic and other similar factors, may increase by not more than twenty for each ten-year period from the date of the national referendum of the year 1368 of the solar Islamic calendar. The Parliament currently has 290 representatives, changed from the previous 272 seats since the 18 February 2000 election. The most recent election took place on 26 February 2016 and the new parliament was opened on 28 May 2016.

==== Guardian Council ====
The Guardian Council is a part of the legislature that acts in many ways as an upper house to the Consultative Assembly. This council reviews the legislation by the Consultative Assembly to examine its compatibility with Islam and the Constitution.

Articles 91-99 are about the Guardian Council. According to article 91, it has 12 members, half its members are faqihs that are chosen by the Supreme Leader and the other six members are jurists who are elected by the Islamic Consultative Assembly from among the Muslim jurists nominated by the Chief Justice of Iran.

=== Executive ===
==== President ====
In the Islamic Republic of Iran, the president is the second person of government and the head of government. He is the highest nominally popularly elected official in Iran, although he answers to the Supreme Leader of Iran, who functions as the country's head of state. Chapter 9 (Articles 133–142) of the Constitution of the Islamic Republic of Iran sets forth the qualifications for presidential candidates and procedures for election, as well as the powers and responsibilities as "functions of the executive". These include signing treaties and other agreements with foreign countries and international organizations, administering national planning, budget and state employment affairs and appointing ministers subject to the approval of Parliament.

According to article 114 the President of Iran is elected for a four-year term by the direct vote of the people and may not serve for more than two consecutive terms nor more than eight years.

=== Judicial system ===
The judiciary of the Islamic Republic of Iran is an independent power, the protector of the rights of the individual and society, responsible for the implementation of justice, and entrusted with the following duties:

1. investigating and passing judgement on grievances, violations of rights, and complaints; the resolving of litigation; the settling of disputes; and the taking of all necessary decisions and measures in probate matters as the law may determine;
2. restoring public rights and promoting justice and legitimate freedoms;
3. supervising the proper enforcement of laws;
4. uncovering crimes; prosecuting, punishing, and chastising criminals; and enacting the penalties and provisions of the Islamic penal code;
5. taking suitable measures to prevent the occurrence of crime and to reform criminals. (Article 156 of Constitution).

=== Other institutions ===
==== Expediency Discernment Council ====
The Expediency Discernment Council is an administrative assembly appointed by the Supreme Leader and was created upon the revision to the Constitution of the Islamic Republic of Iran on 6 February 1988. According to article 112 of Constitution it was originally set up to resolve differences or conflicts between the Consultative Assembly and the Guardian Council, but "its true power lies more in its advisory role to the Supreme Leader".

Members of the council are chosen by the Supreme Leader every five years.

Sadiq Amoli Larijani is the chairman of this council.

==== Local councils ====
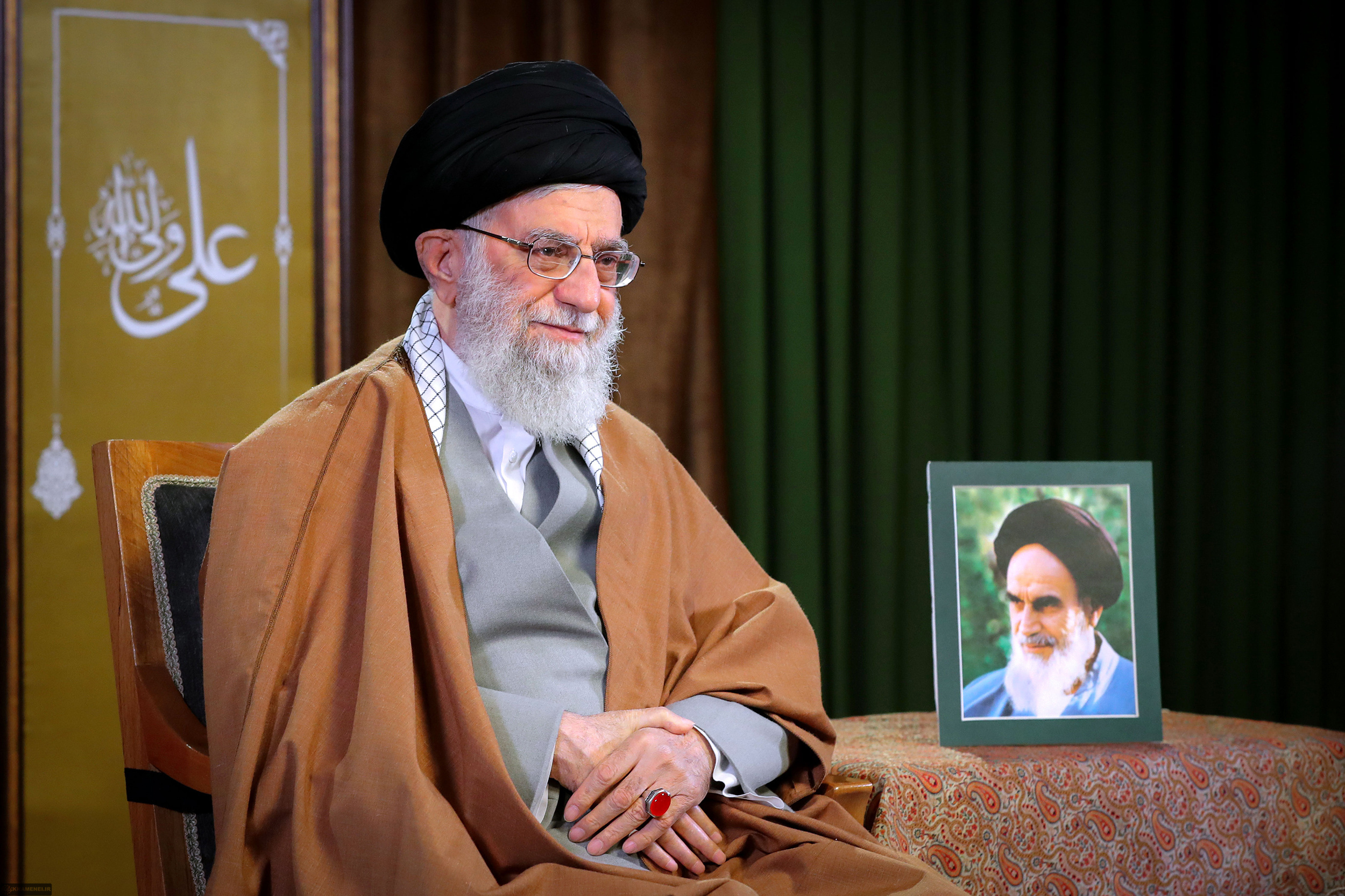
Ali Khamenei, second supreme leader of Iran from 1989 until his assassination in 2026

According to Article 7, city and village councils form one of the decision-making and administrative organs of the country. Chapter seven (article 100–106) of Iran's constitution is about these local councils. According to article 100: In order to expedite social, economic, development, public health, cultural, and educational programmes and facilitate other affairs relating to public welfare with the cooperation of the people according to local needs, the administration of each village, division, city, municipality, and province will be supervised by a council to be named the Village, Division, City, Municipality, or Provincial Council. Members of each of these councils will be elected by the people of the locality in question. Qualifications for the eligibility of electors and candidates for these councils, as well as their functions and powers, the mode of election, the jurisdiction of these councils, the hierarchy of their authority, will be determined by law, in such a way as to preserve national unity, territorial integrity, the system of the Islamic Republic, and the sovereignty of the central government.

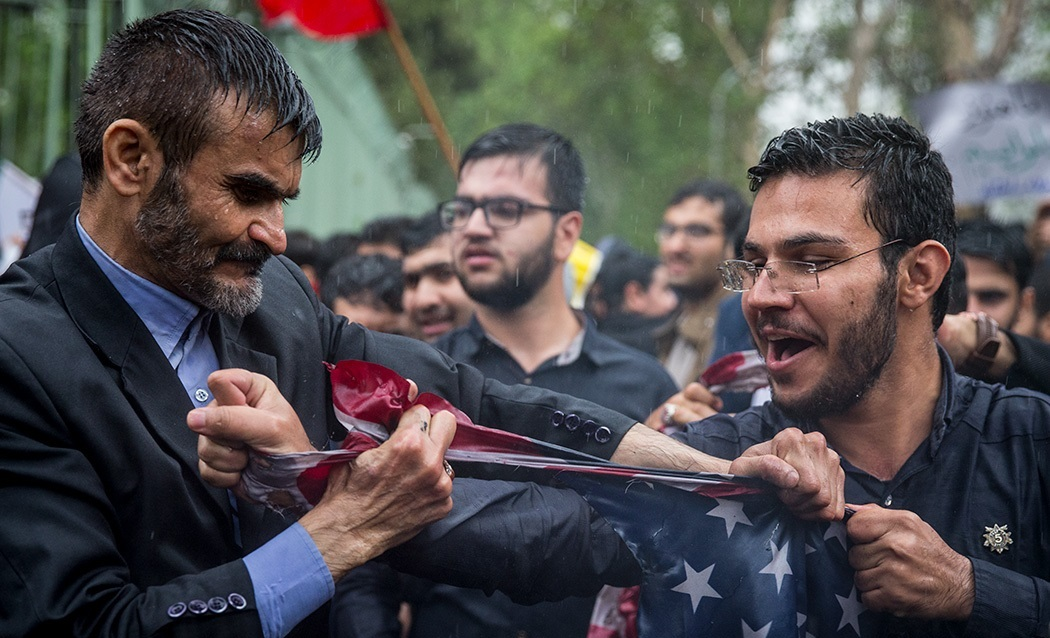
I.R Supporters tearing up the United States flag

==== Islamic Republic of Iran Broadcasting ====
The Islamic Republic of Iran Broadcasting (IRIB) according to Constitution is the only radio and television services in Iran. According to article 175 of Constitution the appointment and dismissal of the head of the Islamic Republic of Iran Broadcasting rests with the Leader. A council consisting of two representatives each of the President, the head of the judiciary branch and the Islamic Consultative Assembly shall supervise the functioning of this organization.

== Armed forces ==
=== General Staff of Armed Forces of the Islamic Republic of Iran ===
The Supreme Leader appoints the General staff of Armed forces of the Islamic Republic of Iran which is the highest military body in Iran, with an aim to implement policy, monitor and coordinate activities within Armed Forces of the Islamic Republic of Iran.

=== Islamic Republic of Iran Army ===
The Islamic Republic of Iran Army (Artesh) is the "conventional military of Iran" and part of Armed Forces of the Islamic Republic of Iran. The army is tasked to protect the territorial integrity of Iranian state from external and internal threats and to project power. According to article 143 of Constitution the Army of the Islamic Republic of Iran is responsible for guarding the independence and territorial integrity of the country, as well as the order of the Islamic Republic. Artesh has its own Joint Staff which coordinates its four separate service branches: Ground Forces, Air Force, Navy and Air Defense Base. The current chief of Army is MG Amir Hatami.

=== Islamic Revolution Guard Corps ===
The Islamic Revolutionary Guard Corps (Sepah) is a branch of Iran's Armed Forces, established after the Islamic revolution on 5 May 1979. Article 150 says about Sepah that The Islamic Revolution Guards Corps, organized in the early days of the triumph of the Revolution, is to be maintained so that it may continue in its role of guarding the Revolution and its achievements.

=== Law Enforcement Force of the Islamic Republic of Iran ===
Law Enforcement Force of the Islamic Republic of Iran is the uniformed police force in Iran. It was established in 1992 by merging the Shahrbani, Gendarmerie and Committee of Iran into a single force, it has more than 60,000 police personnel served under the Ministry of Interior, including border patrol personnel.

== See also ==
- Ayatollah Ruhollah Khomeini
- Human rights in the Islamic Republic of Iran
- Politics of Iran (links to ministries and government agencies)

== Notes ==
State of Iran
Preceded by Interim Government of Iran	Islamic Republic; 1979–present	Incumbent
