= Siamak Rahpeyk =

Iranian jurist

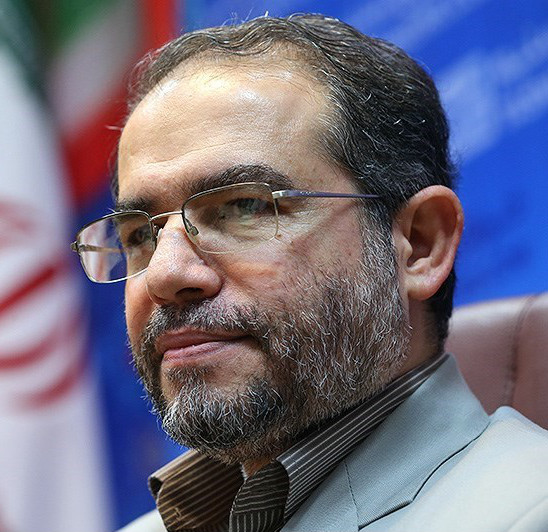
- Rahpeyk in 2014
- Born: June 1962 (age 64); Tehran, Iran
- Education: Tarbiat Modarres University
- Scientific career
- Fields: Jurist
- Workplaces: University of Judicial Sciences and Administrative Services; Guardian Council

Siamak Rahpeyk (Persian: سيامک ره‌پيک; born 1962) is a jurist member of the Guardian Council and current Dean of Faculty of the University of Judicial Sciences and Administrative Services located in Tehran, Iran. He received his Ph.D. in Private Law from Tarbiat Modarres University. Rahpeyk also teaches the law, his main expertise is civil liability, sub sub-specialty: basic rights and security strategy.

Rahpyek is a jurist and the speaker of the Guardian Council of the Constitution of Iran in the Parliament of the Islamic Republic of Iran. His previous positions include: Editor of Journal of Law at the Department of Justice; managing director of the Research Institute of Strategic Studies.

== Books ==
Rahpeyk has authored seventeen legal books in Persian. Including these books:

1. Fundamental Rights of the European Union.Persian: ح‍ق‍وق‌ اس‍اس‍ی‌ ات‍ح‍ادی‍ه‌ اروپ‍ا 2. Philosophical Issues in Law.Persian: م‍س‍ائ‍ل‌ ف‍ل‍س‍ف‍ی‌ در ح‍ق‍وق 3. Difficulty Determining Will Under the French law.Persian: عیوب اراده در حقوق فرانسه 4. Strategic Studies. .Persian: مطالعات راهبردي

Rahpeyk also is a French to Persian translator of legal books. His recent published translation is French Law on Compensation for Non-Performance of Contract.Persian: اصول حقوق فرانسه در جبران عدم اجراي قرارداد

== U.S. Treasury Department Sanctions ==
In February 2020, the U.S. Treasury Department sanctioned Rahpeyk for "preventing free and fair elections in Iran." The U.S. Treasury sanction reads, "Rahpeyk, Kadkhodaei, and Sadeghi Moghadam are being designated pursuant to E.O. 13876 for being persons appointed to a position as a state official of Iran."
