= Family planning in Iran =

Iran had a comprehensive and effective program of family planning since the beginning of the 1990s. While Iran's population grew at a rate of more than 3% per year between 1956 and 1986, the growth rate began to decline in the late 1980s and early 1990s after the government initiated a major population control program. By 2007 the growth rate had declined to 0.7 percent per year, with a birth rate of 17 per 1,000 persons and a death rate of 6 per 1,000. Reports by the UN show birth control policies in Iran to be effective with the country topping the list of greatest fertility decreases. UN's Population Division of the Department of Economic and Social Affairs says that between 1975 and 1980, the total fertility number was 6.5. The projected level for Iran's 2005 to 2010 birth rate is fewer than two.

In late July 2012, Supreme Leader Ali Khamenei described Iran's contraceptive services as "wrong," and Iranian authorities are slashing birth-control programs in what one Western newspaper (USA Today) describes as a "major reversal" of its long standing policy. Whether program cuts and high-level appeals for bigger families will be successful is still unclear.

== History ==
Changes in population of Iran

Population pyramid of Iran, showing a spike of births around 1988

=== Pre-revolutionary era ===
According to Dr Malek Afzali, Iran's deputy minister for research and technology in the Ministry of Health, before the Islamic Revolution, there was family planning but "people did not accept it."

The Tehran Declaration of 1967 claimed that family planning was a human right, and arranged for the creation of both a Family Planning Division as part of the Ministry of Health and a High Council for the Coordination of Family Planning. These programs were responsible for 2,000 nationwide clinics distributing forms of birth control

=== Khomeini Era and pro-natalism ===
Following the creation of the Islamic Republic; family planning clinics of the Shah were dismantled "on the grounds that Islam and Iran needed a large population." The Majlis passed many pro-natalist laws during this era, like the lowering of marriage age to nine years old for girls and fourteen years old for boys, the legalization of polygamy, the artificial inflation of birth control pill price from one hundred rials to one thousand rials per pack, and the creation of the Iranian Marriage foundation which provided newlyweds with furniture to ensure more people could get married and reproduce.

Iran's population boom started before the 1979 Islamic Revolution (in 1976 the fertility rate was 6 children/woman). Data show that Iran's population doubled in just 20 years—from 27 million in 1968 to 55 million in 1988.

At one point in the 1980s estimates predicted that Iran's population would reach 108 million by the year 2006.

=== Rafsanjani era and decreasing natality ===
Following the war with Iraq, the death of Ayatollah Khomeini, and taking office of Supreme Leader Ali Khamenei and President Akbar Hashemi Rafsanjani in 1989, a sharp change was made in Iran's population policy. Realizing "the costs of this burgeoning population were going to far exceed its capacity to provide adequate food, education, housing and employment", Iran's government "declared that Islam favored families with only two children", as one historian put it. Iran's Health Ministry launched a nationwide campaign and introduced contraceptives—pills, condoms, IUDs, implants, tubal ligations, and vasectomies.

In 1993, Parliament passed further legislation withdrawing food coupons, paid maternity leave, and social welfare subsidies after the third child for government and para-government employees. The backlash to this law was severe and application of it remains limited. Birth control classes were required before a couple could get married. Dozens of mobile teams were sent to remote parts of the country to offer free vasectomies and tubal ligations.

By 2001, an Iranian condom factory - the first of its kind in the Middle East - produced more than 70 million condoms a year, "packaged in French or English to suggest that they are imported", according to a foreign reporter. By this time Iran's population growth rate had dropped from an all-time high of 3.2% in 1986 to just 1.2%, one of the fastest drops ever recorded. In reducing its population growth to this level—a rate that is only slightly higher than that of the United States—Iran emerged as a model for other countries that want to lessen the risk of overpopulation. In 2007 Iran's Total Fertility Rate had dropped to 1.71 with a net out-migration of 4.29 ‰ (and population 65 M).

Explaining the change in religious doctrine on population during a birth control workshop in 1995, Deputy Health Minister Husein Malek-Afzali stated "Islam is a flexible religion".

=== Reversal to pro-natalism ===
In October 2006, Iran's President Ahmadinejad called for an increase in Iran's population from 70 to 120 million.

I am against saying that two children are enough. Our country has a lot of capacity. ... for many children to grow in it. ... Westerners have got problems. Because their population growth is negative, they are worried and fear that if our population increases, we will triumph over them.

Critics reacted by noting that Iran was struggling with surging inflation and rising unemployment, estimated at around 11%, and that a population of 120 million could mean a shortage of fresh water limiting "the country’s domestic agricultural and industrial development options," and that some countries "triumph" over others because of superior "knowledge, technology, wealth, welfare, and security", not population size.

Ahmadinejad's call for a higher birth rate reminded some of the demand of Ayatollah Ruhollah Khomeini in 1979 for an increased population, which was eventually reversed in response to the resultant economic strain.

On 25 July 2012, Supreme Leader Khamenei stated that Iran's contraceptive policy made sense 20 years ago, "but its continuation in later years was wrong ... Scientific and experts studies show that we will face population aging and reduction (in population) if the birth-control policy continues."

Deputy health minister Ali Reza Mesdaghinia, was quoted in the semiofficial Fars news agency on 29 July that population control programs "belonged to the past," and that "there is no plan to keep number of the children at one or two. Families should decide about it by themselves. In our culture, having a large number of children has been a tradition. In the past families had five or six children. … The culture still exists in the rural areas. We should go back to our genuine culture." How successful the government will be in surmounting hurdles of changing ideas in society about the role of women and the family, and family worries about money and employment, remains to be seen.

As of 2014, measures to reverse the declining birth rate include: replacing public-health slogans that used to praise “Fewer kids, better life” with billboards that show large, happy families juxtaposed with sad small families; cutting budgets for subsidized condoms and family planning; increasing already generous paternity and maternity leave; and seeking to enact a bill that would make vasectomies and tubectomies, which were free of charge until 2012, treated like abortions - punishable by a jail term of up to five years and payment of diyya (blood money). However, others have suggested that a large youthful population with low job prospects could in fact create greater problems in the future than an aging population.

On November 1, 2021, Iran's Guardian Council approved the “rejuvenation of the population and support of family” bill, which outlaws sterilization and free distribution of contraceptives in the public health care system unless a pregnancy threatens a woman's health.

== See also ==
- Health care in Iran
- Women's rights in Iran
- Demography of Iran
- Abortion in Iran
- Demographic transition
