= Constitution of Iran =

Supreme law of the Islamic Republic of Iran

Constitution of the Islamic Republic of Iran
- The 1979 Constitution of the Islamic Republic of Iran booklet

Overview
- Original title: قانون اساسی جمهوری اسلامی ایران
- Jurisdiction: Islamic Republic of Iran
- Created: 24 October 1979
- Ratified: 3 December 1979
- Date effective: 3 December 1979
- System: Unitary Islamic republic

Government structure
- Branches: 3
- Head of state: Supreme Leader
- Chambers: Islamic Consultative Assembly; Guardian Council
- Executive: President-led Government; Prime Minister (until 1989)
- Judiciary: Judicial system of the Islamic Republic of Iran; Supreme Court of Iran

History
- First legislature: 14 March 1980
- First executive: 4 February 1980
- Amendments: 1
- Last amended: 28 July 1989
- Location: Tehran
- Author: Assembly of Experts for Constitution
- Signatories: Constitutional referendum by the citizens of Iran
- Supersedes: Persian Constitution of 1906

The Constitution of the Islamic Republic of Iran (Note: Persian: قانون اساسی جمهوری اسلامی ایران, romanized: Qânun-e Asâsi-ye Jomhuri-ye Eslâmi-ye Irân, pronounced [ɢɒːˈnuːne ʔæsɒːˈsiːje d͡ʒomɦuːˈɹiːje ʔeslɒːˈmiːje ʔiːˈɹɒːn]) is the supreme law of Iran. It was adopted by referendum on 2 and 3 December 1979, and went into force replacing the Constitution of 1906. It has been amended once, on 28 July 1989. The constitution was originally made up of 175 articles in 12 chapters, but amended in 1989 to 177 articles in 14 chapters.

The Constitution establishes Iran as an Islamic republic and defines the country's political institutions, the powers of the Supreme Leader, president, parliament and judiciary, and the rights and duties of citizens. It combines elected institutions, including the presidency and Islamic Consultative Assembly (Majlis), with unelected institutions, including the Supreme Leader and Guardian Council." The Constitution also establishes Islam as the official religion and requires legislation to conform to Islamic criteria.

== History ==
Over the course of the year 1978 Iran was subject to worsening cycles of "provocation, repression, and polarization" in political unrest. It became more and more clear that the Pahlavi regime was likely to fall and that the leader of the revolution taking his regime down was Ayatollah Ruhollah Khomeini. Work began on a constitution for the new Islamic state that would follow the revolution. A preliminary draft was (according to Asghar Schirazi) begun in Paris by one Hassan Habibi while Khomeini was still in exile there. It was structured like the 1958 constitution of the French Fifth Republic with separation of powers among the executive, judicial and parliamentary branches. An outline was presented to Khomeini in January 1979 and he brought it with him when he returned to Iran. After being reworked by two different commissions, it was published on 14 June 1979 by the provisional government of Mehdi Bazargan as the official preliminary draft of the constitution.

The preliminary draft differed from the final version of the constitution in a number of ways. It made no reference to velayat-e faqih, and did not "reserve any special posts for Islamic jurists" except on the guardian council where they made up a minority and were to be approved by the parliament from a list drawn up by the "highest religious authorities".

Despite this, Khomeini made "only two small changes (in part to bar women from the presidency and judgeships)", in the draft, and publicly stated his approval of the draft "on more than one occasion", declaring at one point that it "must be approved quickly". The Council of the Islamic Revolution approved of it unanimously after examination and "declared it to be the official preliminary draft of the Revolutionary Council".

What happened next is disputed. The revolutionaries' original plan was to have a Constituent Assembly of hundreds of people write the new constitution, but with this broad support for the preliminary draft, there now seemed to be a consensus in favor of a much more streamlined completion. An "Assembly of Experts" of only a few dozen members would go over the text and "present it for final ratification in a national referendum".

But Baqer Moin writes of contradictions in statements by Khomeini and questions about the election of the Experts. At the same time Ayatollah was publicly declaring the draft to be `correct`, he "had already started to denounce the supporters of a `Democratic Islamic Republic,` whose ideas were enshrined in the draft", and who included the man he had appointed president, Bazargan, as `enemies of Islam.` Also dismaying Bazargan and his colleagues, was the decision by the clerical members of the Revolutionary Council, without consulting them, to have the constitution finalized by a much smaller body—an `Assembly of Experts` with 70 members, which alarmed them because with much larger constituencies and fewer candidates "it would be easier to rig the elections". If Khomeini's network succeeded in doing so, "the likelihood of dissenting voices in the Assembly could be reduced to almost nothing".

During a joint summit between the members of the provisional government and the Superieur Council of Revolution with the presence of Khomeini in Qom, it was decided that an Assembly for the Final Review of the Constitution was to be established for a final evaluation of the constitution of Iran.

=== Assembly of Experts ===
The assembly members were voted on in the summer of 1979. Out of the "72 delegates whose election was officially recognized, 55 were clerics", almost all of them following "the line of the Imam", i.e. Khomeini loyalists. (Other delegates were from different minorities of religions, scientists, Athletes.)

Schirazi writes that Khomeini then announced that the job of "determining whether or not" the constitution was "in conformity with Islamic requirements" was "exclusively reserved for revered jurists", to the surprise of those outside his network. Also at odds with previous statements was that instead of quickly approving the draft, the Assembly for the Final Review of the Constitution (dominated by Khomeini supporters) rewrote it, adding a Guardian Jurist (wali-e faqih) leader with powers over other branches of government, and significantly increasing the power of the Council of Guardians. (The offices of the President and the Prime Minister were retained for the executive branch of government from the French model.)

A different version of events comes from Shaul Bakhash, who writes that Khomeini and his supporters accepted the preliminary draft but were provoked by an "opposition determined to establish a secular state". A secularist group calling itself a "Seminar on the People's Expectations from the Constitution", called for changes in the draft: "a ceremonial president, supremacy of parliament, independent judiciary, individual rights, and equal rights for women, proposed making the universal declaration of Human Rights part of the constitution, more decentralization, and `democratization` of the army". This led "Khomeini to spur the Islamic groups to counterattack', telling his supporters that the determination of whether articles of the constitution meet Islamic criteria `lies within the exclusive jurisdiction of the leading Islamic jurists,` and non-jurists should not get involved. "It quickly became clear to Khomeini and his lieutenants that there existed considerable support and no mass opposition to the doctrine and that the constitution could serve to institutionalize both the supremacy of the faqih and clerical rule." The idea that Khomeini "should be entrusted with supreme authority under the constitution" was brought up by provincial clerics in the Assembly and was quickly embraced by the Assembly.

The assembly worked for sixty-seven sessions and in four rounds. The first round was considered with a preliminary evaluating of principles. The second round considered with providing principles in groups. The third round dealt with approbation of principles and the fourth round with investigation of all collection of principles.

According to a legal bill of council of revolution, the draft was put to a vote through a referendum, with voters given the option of voting yes or no. On 2–3 December 1979 Iranians voted, and the official result was over 99% in favor. (The vote was boycotted by some secular, leftist and Kurdish groups; and total of 15,578,956 votes was almost 5 million less than the earlier referendum for an Islamic Republic.)

=== 1989 Amendments ===
On 24 April 1989, Ayatollah Khomeini issued a decree convening an Assembly for Revising the Constitution. It made several changes in the constitution, in Articles 5, 107, 109, 111, eliminating the need for the Supreme Leader to be a Marja' chosen by popular acclaim. It made permanent the Expediency Discernment Council to work out disagreements between the Parliament and Council of Guardians, and eliminated the post of Prime Minister. The amendment concerning qualifications for the Supreme Leader is thought to have been introduced and approved because no marja' had given strong support for Khomeini's policies. The amendments were approved by the voting public on 28 July 1989 (in same election as Akbar Hashemi Rafsanjani was elected to the first of two terms as President of Iran).

== Islamic principles ==
=== Velayat-e Faqih ===
While liberal and leftist values are present in the constitution, overriding both are "the values, principles and institutions of an ideal Islamic society". The Ayatollah Khomeini's concept of Velayat-e Faqih, i.e. Guardianship or rule of the Islamic Jurist, is enshrined in several places in the constitution. One example is the section "Method of Governance in Islam" in the preamble, where it is stated

in creating the political infrastructures and institutions which make the foundation of society on the basis of an ideological outlook, the righteous assume the responsibility of governing and administering the country with the Qur’anic verse (verily, my righteous servants shall inherit the earth Q.21:105)

In case the term 'righteous' is ambiguous, a later section of the Preamble (Guardianship of the Jurist) states

On the basis of continuous Guardianship and Leadership (Imamate) the Constitution provides for leadership under all conditions, (by a person) recognized by the people as lender, so that there shall be security against deviation by various organizations ("The course of affairs is in the hands of those who know God and who are trustworthy in matters having to do with what he permits and forbids")

Article 109 stipulates that the Leader must possess the "scholarship, as required for performing the functions of mufti in different fields of fiqh", i.e. only a high level cleric of Islamic law may be the Leader. Article 113 states the Leader is the highest public official in Islamic Republic of Iran. The Head of Judiciary, who has considerable power (establishing the organizational structure of the judiciary, drafting judiciary bills for parliament, hiring, dismissing, transferring judges), must be an Islamic legal cleric (mujtahid); as must the President of the Supreme Court, the Attorney General (Article 162), and six out of the twelve members of the Guardian Council who are appointed by the Leader (Article 91) and have the power to veto legislation from the parliament that they believe does not conform to sharia (Article 96).

=== Sharia ===
Hassan Vakilian cites Article 4:

civil, penal financial, economic, administrative, cultural, military, political, and other laws and regulations must be based on Islamic criteria. This principle applies absolutely and generally to all articles of the Constitution as well as to all other laws and regulations…

as evidence "Sharia laws and principles" ("Islamic criteria" in the article above) "must be considered as a main source of the legal order" in the constitution. Sharia is referred to numerous times in the constitution but often by another terms (as it is above):

- In the Preamble: "Islamic principles", "Islamic rules", "Islamic standards", "Islamic program", "Rules of Islamic codes", "Islamic ordinances and regulations";
- In articles 110, 147, 151, 167, 171, 175 and 177 "Islamic criteria".
- Other terms used are "Islamic law" (Article 45), "Islamic ordinances" (Article 91), "Islamic regulations" (Article 107), "Norms and principles of Islamic justice" (Article 14), "Principles and commandments of official religion" (Article 85), "Principles of Sharia" (Article 112), "Criteria of Fiqh" (Article 163), "Islamic sources and authentic fatwa" (Article 167).

== Preamble ==
The preamble or introduction of the constitution touches on (its version of) events leading up to the revolution and on key features of the new Islamic regime:

- How the "anti-despotic movement for constitutional government [1906–1911], and anti-colonialist movement for the nationalization of petroleum" in the 1950s failed "due to departure from genuine Islamic positions"; a matter rectified by the "authentically Islamic and ideological line" under the leadership pursued under the leadership of Grand Ayatollah Khomeini.
- How the movement dawned in June 1963 with "the devastating protest by Imam Khomeini against the American conspiracy known as the 'White Revolution'".
- The plan of Islamic government set forth by Imam Khomeini known as "governance of the faqih".
- The fury of the Iranian people at a January 7, 1978 newspaper article insulting Imam Khomeini.
- The "watering" of the "sapling" of the revolution "by the blood of 60,000 martyrs".
- How 98.2% of voters approved of Iran becoming an Islamic Republic.
- Our nation "intends to establish the ideal and model society" with the final goal of "movement toward God".
- Governance by the "just faqih" will prevent deviation of the government from essential Islamic duties.
- The economy in Islam will be "a means not an end", providing work, "suitable opportunities", "essential needs".
- The family is "the fundamental unit of society" within which women will recover their "precious function of motherhood".
- The Army and Islamic Revolutionary Guard Corps are responsible not only for guarding the country but for "fulfilling the ideological mission of jihad in God's path".
- The judicial system will be based on Islamic justice.
- The executive branch will implement "the laws and ordinances of Islam".
- "Mass communications media" will diffuse Islamic culture and refrain from anti-Islamic "qualities".
- The "central axis" of the theocracy shall be Quran and hadith, and as framed by the Assembly of Experts for Constitution, who hope that "this century will witness the establishment of a universal holy government and the downfall of all others." (See also: Mahdi and Mohammed al-Mahdi)

== Chapter I [Article 1 to 14]: General principles ==
Some of the more important articles of the constitution are described below:

=== Article 1 (Form of government) ===
The form of Government in Iran is that of an Islamic Republic following the Islamic revolution led by Grand Ayatollah Khomeini, affirmed by the referendum of Farvardin 9 and 10.

=== Article 2 (Foundation) ===
The Islamic Republic is a system based on the belief in:

1. One God (as stated in the phrase "There is no god except Allah"), who has exclusive sovereignty and right to legislate, and whose commands must be submitted to;
2. the fundamental role of divine revelation in setting forth the laws;
3. the return to Allah after death and resurrection, and the constructive role of this belief has in the course of man's ascent toward Allah;
4. the justice of Allah in creation and legislation;
5. continuous leadership and perpetual guidance, and its fundamental role in ensuring the uninterrupted process of the revolution of Islam;
6. the exalted dignity and value of man, and his freedom coupled with responsibility before God; in which equity, justice, political, economic, social, and cultural independence, and national solidarity are secured by recourse to:
  1. continuous Ijtihad of Islamic jurists possessing necessary qualifications, exercised on the basis of the Quran and the Sunnah of the prophet Muhammad;
  2. sciences and arts and the most advanced results of human experience, together with the effort to advance them further;
  3. negation of all forms of oppression, both the infliction of and the submission to it, and of dominance, both its imposition and its acceptance.

=== Article 3 (State goals) ===
The duty of the Islamic Republic is to direct all of its resources to a number of goals.

1. Support of faith and piety and struggle against vice and corruption
2. Raising of public awareness through the proper use of the mass media and press
3. Free education
4. Free physical training
5. Strengthening advanced scientific research
6. The elimination of imperialism and foreign influence
7. The elimination of despotism, autocracy and monopoly
8. Ensure social and political freedoms within the law
9. The end to all forms of undesirable discrimination
10. The elimination of unnecessary governmental organizations
11. Universal military training

These goals were designed to emphasize positive liberty.

Some of the goals are put in context of the requirements of Islam. For example:

1. The planning of a correct and just economic system
2. The expansion of Islamic brotherhood among all peoples
3. The creation of the government's foreign policy

=== Article 4 (Islamic Principle) ===
All laws and regulations "absolutely and generally" must be based on Islamic criteria. Enforcing this will be the Islamic jurists (fuqaha') and the Council of Guardians.

==== Constitution compared to traditional Islam ====
Olivier Roy points out that traditionally sharia was the "sole foundation for the judicial norm", not constitutions which were secular. Khomeini himself specifically affirmed the preeminence of the Islamic state over sharia in January 1989 when he publicly dressed down the future Supreme Leader Ali Khamanei, pronouncing the opposite.

On key questions Iranian law remains fairly un-Islamic. The constitution grants equal rights among men and women (article 20). The discretionary law of repudiation was not recognized for men. There is no legal discrimination on the basis of personal status against Christians, Jews, Zoroastrians, all of whom perform military service, pay no special taxes and hold full citizenship; nevertheless they are prohibited from assuming leadership posts and vote in separate colleges. Similarly, a Muslim foreigner has the same status as a Christian foreigner. In short Iranian citizenship is not an Islamic notion. Finally, Iran has kept the solar calendar and celebrates the new year on March 21.

=== Article 5 (Religious leader's office) ===
During the occultation of the Twelfth Imam, the Ummah (Islamic community) must be led by a just and pious, courageous, resourceful faqih (Islamic jurist) knowledgeable about affairs of the day, in accordance with Article 107.

=== Article 12 (Official religion) ===
"The official religion of Iran is Islam"—specifically of the Twelver Shi'ism in Usul al-Dîn and of the Ja'farî school in fiqh—"and this principle will remain eternally immutable."

=== Article 13 (Recognized religious minorities) ===
"Zoroastrian, Jewish, and Christian Iranians are the only recognized religious minorities", who, within the limits of the law, are free to perform their religious rites and ceremonies, and to act according to their own canon in matters of personal affairs and religious education.

=== Article 14 (Non-Muslims) ===
"The government ... and all Muslims are duty-bound to treat non-Muslims" with "Islamic justice and equity", provided those non-Muslims "refrain from engaging in conspiracy or activity against Islam and the Islamic Republic of Iran".

== Chapter II [Article 15 to 18]: Language, script, calendar and flag ==
=== Article 15 (Official language) ===
The "Official language and writing script of Iran is Persian. In addition "regional and tribal languages" are allowed "in the press and mass media, as well as for teaching of their literature in schools"

=== Article 16 (Arabic education) ===
"Since the language of the Qur'an and Islamic texts [...] is Arabic", Arabic "must be taught [...] in school from elementary grades until the end of high school."

=== Article 17 (Official calendar) ===
The official calendar of Iran is the Solar Hijri calendar, which combines a year one from the Islamic Hijri calendar, and organization of months according to the Iranian solar calendar. "The official weekly holiday is Friday. Both the solar and lunar Islamic calendars are recognized".

=== Article 18 (Official flag) ===
The official flag of Iran is composed of green, white and red colours with the special emblem of the Islamic Republic, together with the motto (Allahu Akbar).

== Chapter III [Article 19 to 42]: Rights ==
=== Article 20 (Women's rights) ===
Women will enjoy equal legal, human, political, economic, social, and cultural rights, when in conformity with Islamic criteria.

=== Article 22 (Individual rights) ===
"The dignity, life, property, rights," etc. "of the individual are inviolate", "except in cases sanctioned by law".

=== Article 23 (Individual beliefs) ===
The Iranian constitution holds that “the investigation of individuals’ beliefs is forbidden, and no one may be molested or taken to task simply for holding a certain belief.”

=== Article 24 (Publications and the press) ===
"Publications and the press are free to discuss issues" unless it is "deemed harmful to the principles of Islam or the rights of the public."

=== Article 27 (Freedom of assembly) ===
Assembly is allowed, "provided arms are not carried" and the assemblies "are not detrimental to the fundamental principles of Islam".

=== Article 37 (Presumption of innocence) ===
"Innocence is to be presumed, [...] unless his or her guilt has been established by a competent court."

=== Article 29 (Welfare benefits) ===
It is a "universal right" of all to enjoy social insurance or other forms of security for "retirement, unemployment, old-age disability", lack of guardianship, being a wayfarer, accident and the need for health and treatment services and medical care. The government, in accordance with the laws and by drawing on national revenues, is required to provide such insurance and economic protection to each and every citizen of the country.

=== Article 38 (Torture is forbidden) ===
"All forms of torture for the purpose of extracting confession or acquiring information are forbidden. Compulsion of individuals to testify, confess, or take an oath is not permissible; and any testimony, confession, or oath obtained under duress is devoid of value and credence. Violation of this article is liable to punishment in accordance with the law."

=== Article 39 ===
Any violation of the honor and dignity of a person arrested, detained, imprisoned or exiled in accordance with the law is prohibited and punishable.

=== Article 40 ===
No one may turn the exercise of their rights into a means of harming others or violating public interests.

=== Article 41 ===
Iranian citizenship is an inalienable right of every Iranian, and the government cannot deprive any Iranian of this right unless he or she requests it or takes the citizenship of another country.

=== Article 42 ===
Foreign nationals can acquire Iranian citizenship within the limits of the law, and the revocation of their citizenship is possible if another state accepts them as citizens or they themselves request it.

== Chapter IV [Article 43 to 55]: Financial affairs ==
=== Article 43 ===
In order to ensure the economic independence of society, eradicate poverty and depravation and in order to meet the needs of people in the process of growth, while also guaranteeing their freedom, the economy of the Islamic Republic of Iran is based on the following criteria:

1. Meeting the basic needs of housing, food, clothing, health, medical care, education and necessary facilities to start a family for all.
2. Providing the conditions and facilities for all to work with the aim of achieving full employment, making means of labor available for those who are able to work but lack the necessary means, in the form of cooperatives, granting interest-free loans or any other shari’a compliant means that will neither lead to the concentration and accumulation of wealth in the hands of a few individuals and groups nor will let the State become the large absolute employer. This should be done with due regard for the necessities of general planning for the country’s economy in each stage of growth.
3. Organizing the country’s economic plan in such a way that the form, content and hours of work are such that each individual, in addition to his endeavors at work, has enough time and energy for spiritual, political and social development, for active participation in the management of the country’s affairs and for improving his skills and creativity.
4. Ensuring the freedom to choose an employment, not forcing people to engage in a particular employment, and preventing the exploitation of another person’s employment.
5. Prohibition of causing damage to others, monopoly, hoarding, usury, and other invalid and harām transactions.
6. Prohibition of wastefulness and extravagance in all areas related to economy, including consumption, investment, production, distribution and services.
7. Using sciences and technologies and training skilled individuals as needed for the development and progress of the country’s economy.
8. Preventing foreign domination of the country’s economy.
9. Laying emphasis on increasing agricultural, livestock and industrial productions to meet public needs and to bring the country to self-sufficiency and freedom from dependence.

=== Article 44 ===
"The economy of Iran is to consist of three sectors: state, cooperative, and private; and is to be based on systematic and sound planning." "All large-scale and mother industries, foreign trade, major minerals, banking, insurance, power generation, dams, and large-scale irrigation networks, radio and television, post, telegraph and telephone services, aviation, shipping, roads, railroads and the like" are to be entirely owned by the government. This article was amended in 2004 to allow for privatization.

=== Article 45 ===
Anfāl and public wealth and properties, including mawāt or abandoned lands, mines, seas, lakes, rivers and other public waters, mountains, valleys, forests, marshlands, natural prairies, postures that are not restricted, inheritance without heirs, properties whose owners are unknown, and public properties recovered from usurpers shall be at the disposal of the Islamic government to use in accordance with the public interest. Details and the ways of using each of them shall be specified by law.

=== Article 46 ===
Everyone is the owner of the income earned from his or her legitimate work and business and no one can deprive another person of the opportunity to work and do business under the pretext of ownership of his or her work and business.

=== Article 47 ===
Private ownership acquired through mashru’ means is respected. The related criteria are determined by law.

=== Article 48 ===
There should be no discrimination in the exploitation of natural resources and the use of national revenues at the provincial level and in the distribution of economic activities among the provinces and regions of the country, so that each region can have access to the necessary capital and facilities commensurate with its needs and capacity for growth.

=== Article 49 (Ill-gotten wealth) ===
"The government has the responsibility of confiscating all wealth accumulated through usury, usurpation, bribery, embezzlement, theft, gambling, misuse of endowments, misuse of government contracts and transactions, the sale of uncultivated lands and other resources subject to public ownership, the operation of centers of corruption, and other illicit means and sources, and restoring it to its legitimate owner; and if no such owner can be identified, it must be entrusted to the public treasury. This rule must be executed by the government with due care, after investigation and furnishing necessary evidence in accordance with the law of Islam."

=== Article 50 (Environment) ===
Protecting the environment is "a public duty" and economic activity that degrades or causes irreversible harm to the environment is forbidden.

=== Article 51 ===
No tax shall be levied except in accordance with the law. Cases of tax exemption, relief and reduction shall be determined by law.

=== Article 52 ===
The annual budget of the country is prepared by the Administration [Executive Branch] and submitted to the Islamic Shura Majlis (Islamic Consultative Assembly) for review and approval in accordance with law. Any change in the figures of the budget shall also be made in accordance with the procedures established by law.

=== Article 53 ===
All of the sums received by the Government shall be deposited in the accounts of the General Treasury and all reimbursements shall be made within the limits of approved credits in accordance with law.

=== Article 54 ===
The country’s Supreme Audit Court is under the direct supervision of the Islamic Shura Majlis (Islamic Consultative Assembly). The organization and administration of its affairs in Tehran and the provincial capitals shall be specified by law.

=== Article 55 ===
The country’s Supreme Audit Court shall, in the manner prescribed by law, examine or audit all the accounts of the ministries, institutions, state enterprises and other organizations that in any way use the country’s general budget, in order to ensure that no expenditure exceeds the approved allocations and that every sum is spent for the intended purpose. The Supreme Audit Court shall, in accordance with law, collect the relevant accounts, records and documents and submit an annual budget settlement report in addition to its own comments to the Islamic Shura Majlis. This report must be made available to the public.

== Chapter V [Article 56 to 61]: Right of national sovereignty ==
The executive, judicial, and legislative branches are separate powers and supervised by the leadership (Article 57); Pursuant to Article 60, the president fulfills "executive" functions "except in the matters that are directly placed under the jurisdiction of the [Leader]" as enumerated in Article 110. Suspension of elections is allowed during wartime (Article 68).

=== Article 56 ===
Absolute sovereignty over the world and human belongs to God and He has made humans sovereign over their own social destiny. No one can deprive humans of this divine right or subordinate it to the interests of a particular individual or group. The people shall exercise this divine right in the manner set forth in the following articles.

=== Article 57 ===
The governing powers in the Islamic Republic of Iran include: the Legislative, the Executive and the Judiciary branches, which operate under the supervision of the Wilayat-ul Mutlaqah-ul Amr and Imamate of the Ummah (Guardianship of the Islamic Jurist) in accordance with the [forthcoming] articles of this Constitution. These branches of government are independent of each other.

=== Article 58 ===
The Legislative branch operates through the Islamic Shura Majlis (Islamic Consultative Assembly), which is composed of the elected representatives of the people and whose legislation, after passing through the stages specified in the following articles, shall be communicated to the Executive and Judiciary branches for implementation.

=== Article 59 ===
In very important economic, political, social and cultural matters, the Legislative power may be exercised through referendum and directly referring to people’s vote. A motion to refer a matter to people’s vote must be approved by two-thirds of the members of the Majlis (parliament).

=== Article 60 ===
The Executive Branch - except in those matters directly entrusted to the Leader by this Constitution - operates through the President and the Cabinet Ministers.

=== Article 61 ===
The Judiciary operates through courts of law, which must be established according to Islamic criteria and work to adjudicate and settle disputes, protect public rights, expand and uphold justice, and to implement Divine hudud [corporal punishments].

== Chapter VI [Article 62 to 99]: Legislative powers ==
Representatives of the people to be members of the Islamic Consultative Assembly will be elected directly and by secret ballot (Article 62),

Term of membership in the Islamic Consultative Assembly is four years (Article 63),

=== Article 62 ===
The Islamic Shura Majlis shall consist of the representatives of the nation elected directly by secret ballot. The qualifications of voters and candidates and the manner of holding elections shall be determined by law.

=== Article 63 ===
The representative legislative term in the Islamic Shura Majlis is four years. The elections in each term must be held before the end of the previous term so that the country shall at no time be without an parliament.

=== Article 64 ===
The number of members of the Islamic Shura Majlis shall be 270 and taking into account human, political, geographical and similar factors, the number of parliament members [MMs] may be increased by not more than 20 every ten years from the date of the referendum held in the solar Hijri calendar year of 1368 [1989].

Zoroastrians and Jews shall each elect one representative, Assyrian and Chaldean Christians shall jointly elect one representative, and Armenian Christians in the north and in the south shall each elect one representative to the Majlis.

The boundaries of the constituencies and the number of representatives (for each constituency) shall be determined by law.

=== Article 65 ===
After the elections are held, the sessions of the Islamic Shura Majlis shall be official when two-thirds of the total number of members are present.

Bills and laws shall be adopted in accordance with the Internal Statute approved by the Majlis, except in cases where the Constitution has established a specific quorum. The approval of the Internal Statute shall require the affirmative vote of two-thirds of the MMs present.

=== Article 66 ===
The Internal Statute of the Islamic Shura Majlis shall determine the manner of election of the Speaker and the members of the Presiding Board, the number of committees and their term of office, as well as matters related to discussions and maintaining order in the Majlis.

Article 67 At the first session of the Majlis, the members must take the following oath and affix their signatures to the text of the oath:

“In the Name of Allāh, the Most Compassionate, the Most Merciful. I, in the presence of the Glorious Quran, swear by God the Almighty and the Exalted, and pledge on my human honor, to protect the sanctity of Islam and safeguard the achievements of the Islamic Revolution of the Iranian nation and the foundations of the Islamic Republic, to protect as a just trustee, the rust that has been entrusted to us by the nation, to remain trustworthy and observe piety in fulfilling my duties as a representative, to always be committed to the independence and exaltation of the country and the protection of the rights of the nation and service to the people, to defend the Constitution and to remain mindful of the independence of the country, the freedom of the people and the protection of their interests in my statements, writings and the expression of my views.”.

Representatives of religious minorities shall take this oath referring to their own divine book. Members who are not present at the first session must perform the oath-taking ceremony during the first session they attend.

=== Article 68 ===
In times of war and military occupation of the country, the elections in the occupied regions or in the whole country shall be postponed for a certain period of time on the proposal of the President, approved by three-fourths of the MMs and confirmed by the Shura-ye Negahban. If a new Majlis is not formed, the former Majlis shall continue to function.

=== Article 69 ===
The deliberations of the Islamic Shura Majlis have to be open and the full report of them shall be made known to the public through the radio or the official gazette.

In emergency conditions, if safeguarding the security of the country necessitates it, a closed session is held at the request of the President, one of the cabinet ministers or ten members of the Majlis. The decisions taken in closed session shall be valid only if they are approved, in the presence of the Shura-ye Negahban, by three-fourths of the members of the Majlis. The reports of the closed sessions and their approvals shall be made available to the public after the emergency conditions cease to exist.

=== Article 70 ===
The President, Vice-Presidents and Cabinet Ministers have the right to attend the open sessions of the Majlis collectively or individually and may also be accompanied by their advisors and if the members of the Majlis consider it necessary, the Cabinet Ministers are obliged to attend [the session] and whenever they request, their remarks shall be heard.

=== Article 71 ===
The Islamic Shura Majlis may legislate on all matters within the limits set by the Constitution.

=== Article 72 ===
The Islamic Shura Majlis cannot pass laws that contradict the principles and rules of the official religion of the country or the Constitution. It is the responsibility of the Shura-ye Negahban to ensure this, in accordance with Article 96.

=== Article 73 ===
The explanation and interpretation of ordinary laws fall within the competence of the Islamic Shura Majlis. The intent of this Article does not preclude the prosecutor’s interpretation of the law in determining the truth.

=== Article 74 ===
Government bills are submitted to the Majlis after being approved by the Cabinet of Ministers, and Majlis member bills may be submitted to the Majlis for consideration at the request of at least 15 MMs.

=== Article 75 ===
Majlis bills and MMs’ proposals and amendments to Government bills that result in a decrease in public revenues or an increase in public expenditures may be considered in the Majlis provided that the means for compensating for the decrease in income or for covering the new expenditures are also specified.

=== Article 76 ===
The Islamic Shura Majlis has the right of investigation and inquiry into all the affairs of the country.

=== Article 77 ===
International treaties, conventions, contracts and agreements must be ratified by the Islamic Shura Majlis.

=== Article 78 ===
Any change in the boundaries of the country is forbidden, except for minor amendments (made) while preserving the interests of the country and provided that they are not unilateral, do not violate the independence and territorial integrity of the country, and are ratified by four-fifths of the total members of the Islamic Shura Majlis.

=== Article 79 ===
The imposition of martial law is prohibited. In the event of war or a similar emergency, the Government shall have the right, with the approval of the Islamic Shura Majlis, to temporarily impose the necessary restrictions, the duration of which shall not exceed thirty days. If the necessity continues (beyond thirty days), the Government shall be obliged to seek the approval of the Majlis again.

=== Article 80 ===
The receipt and granting of domestic or foreign loans or gratuitous grants by the Government must be ratified by the Islamic Shura Majlis.

=== Article 81 ===
It is absolutely forbidden to grant concessions to foreigners for the establishment of companies and institutions engaged in commercial, industrial, agricultural, mining and services fields.

=== Article 82 ===
The Government is prohibited from employing foreign experts except in necessary cases and with the approval of the Islamic Shura Majlis.

=== Article 83 ===
State-owned buildings and properties that are part of the national heritage cannot be transferred to others except with the approval of the Islamic Shura Majlis and only if they are not among unique treasures.

=== Article 84 ===
Every Member of Parliament is responsible to the whole nation and has the right to express his or her views on all of the domestic and foreign affairs of the country.

=== Article 85 ===
Membership (in the Majlis) is vested in the individual and cannot be transferred to another person. The Majlis may not delegate the legislative power to any person or committee, but in cases of necessity, it may delegate the power to legislate certain laws to its internal committees in accordance with Article 72. In this case, the laws shall be implemented on an interim basis for a period of time to be determined by the Majlis and their final approval shall rest with the Majlis.

The Majlis may also, in accordance with Article 72, delegate to the related committees the responsibility for the permanent approval of the statutes of organizations, companies and institutions belonging to or affiliated with the Government, or give the Government the authority to approve them. If so, the Government approvals must not be inconsistent with the principles and rules of the official religion of the country or the Constitution, and the Shura-ye Negahban shall determine this, in accordance with Article 96.

Moreover, the Government approvals must not be contrary to the laws and general regulations of the country, and in addition to promulgating them for implementation, they must be brought to the knowledge of the Speaker of the Islamic Shura Majlis to study and confirm that they are not contrary to the laws.

=== Article 86 ===
In carrying out their duties as representatives, MMs are completely free in expressing their opinions and casting their votes and they cannot be prosecuted or arrested for the opinions they express in the Majlis or the votes they cast in carrying out their duties as representatives.

=== Article 87 ===
The president must obtain a vote of confidence from the Majlis for Cabinet of Ministers after it is formed and before taking any other action. During his term, the President may also seek a vote of confidence from the Majlis for the Cabinet of Ministers on important and controversial issues.

=== Article 88 ===
Whenever at least one-fourth of the total number of the MMs submit a question to the President, or whenever a MM submits a question to a Cabinet of Ministers concerning one of his or her duties, the President or the Minister shall appear before the Majlis and answer the question. The answer may not be delayed for more than a month in the case of the President and ten days in the case of the Minister, unless there is a valid excuse accepted by the Islamic Shura Majlis.

=== Article 89 ===
Members of the Islamic Shura Majlis may impeach the Cabinet of Ministers or any of the Ministers if they deem it necessary.

A motion of impeachment may be submitted if it bears the signatures of at least ten MMs. The Cabinet of Ministers or the impeached Minister must appear before the Majlis within ten days of the submission of the impeachment motion to answer it and to seek a vote of confidence. If the Cabinet of Ministers or the Minister in question does not attend the Majlis, the members who submitted the impeachment motion shall provide the necessary explanations about the impeachment and the Majlis shall declare a vote of no confidence if it deems it necessary. If the Majlis does not pass a vote of confidence, the Cabinet of Ministers or the impeached Minister is dismissed. In both cases, the impeached Ministers may not be part of the next Cabinet of Ministers formed immediately thereafter.

If at least one-third of the members of the Islamic Shura Majlis impeach the President regarding the fulfilment of his responsibilities relating to the management of the Executive Branch and the running of the executive affairs of the country, the President must appear before the Majlis within one month after the submission of the impeachment motion and give sufficient explanations regarding the matters raised. If, after hearing the statements of the members who are for or against (the impeachment) and the reply of the President, two-thirds of the MMs declare a vote of no confidence, this will be communicated to the Leader for information and implementation of Section 10 of Article 110 of the Constitution.

=== Article 90 ===
Anyone who has a complaint about the work of the Majlis, the Executive or the Judiciary Branches may submit it in writing to the Majlis. The Majlis shall investigate the complaint and give an adequate response. If the complaint concerns the Executive or the Judiciary Branches, the Majlis shall demand from them a proper investigation of the matter and an adequate explanation and shall announce the results in due time and if the subject of the complaint relates to the public, the answer shall be made public.

=== Article 91 ===
In order to safeguard the rules of Islam and the Constitution by ensuring that the laws passed by the Islamic Shura Majlis do not contradict them, a council known as the Shura-ye Negahban shall be formed with the following composition:

1-Six fuqaha who are just and conscious of the present-day needs and the issues of the day. They shall be selected by the Leader.

2-Six jurists specializing in different fields of law. They shall be elected by Islamic Shura Majlis from among Muslim jurists introduced to the Majlis by the Head of the Judiciary.

=== Article 92 ===
The members of the Shura-ye Negahban shall be elected for a term of six years. But during the first term, after three years, half of the members of each group shall change by lot, and new members shall be elected in their place.

=== Article 93 ===
The Islamic Shura Majlis has no legal status without the existence of the Shura-ye Negahban, except for the approval of the credentials of the members (of the Majlis) and the election of the six jurists of the Shura-ye Negahban.

=== Article 94 ===
All laws passed by the Islamic Shura Majlis shall be sent to the Shura-ye Negahban. After receiving it, the Shura-ye Negahban, within a maximum of ten days, must review the legislation in terms of its compatibility with the criteria of Islam and the Constitution, and if it finds the legislation incompatible, it shall return it to the Majlis for review. Otherwise, the legislation shall be considered enforceable.

=== Article 95 ===
In cases where the Shura-ye Negahban deems ten days to be insufficient to examine and formulate an opinion, it may request the Islamic Shura Majlis to grant an extension of a maximum of ten days. The Shura-ye Negahban must state the reason for the requested extension.

=== Article 96 ===
The compatibility of the laws passed by the Islamic Shura Majlis with the rules of Islam is determined by the majority vote of the fuqaha of the Shura-ye Negahban, and their compatibility with the Constitution is determined by the majority vote of all the members of the Shura-ye Negahban.

=== Article 97 ===
In order to speed up the legislative process, the members of the Shura-ye Negahban may attend the Majlis and listen to the debates on a government or Majlis bills. However, if there is an urgent Majlis or government bill on the agenda of the Majlis, the members of the Shura-ye Negahban must attend the Majlis and express their views.

=== Article 98 ===
The interpretation of the Constitution is vested in the Shura-ye Negahban and it shall be done with the approval of three-fourth of its members.

=== Article 99 ===
The Shura-ye Negahban is responsible for monitoring the elections of Leadership Experts Majlis, the President, and the Islamic Shura Majlis, as well as issues that are put to a direct vote of the people and referenda.

== Chapter VII [Article 100 to 106]: Local councils ==
=== Article 100 ===
In order to expeditiously advance social, economic, developmental, health, cultural and educational programs and other matters of public welfare with the cooperation of the people according to local needs, the administration of each village, district, city, county and province shall be supervised by a council known as the village, district, city, county or provincial shura, the members of which shall be elected by the people of the locality.

The qualifications for the eligibility of voters and candidates, the functions and powers, the manner of election, the jurisdiction, and the hierarchy of authority of the shuras shall be determined by law in accordance with the principles of national unity, territorial integrity, the system of the Islamic Republic and loyalty to the central government.

=== Article 101 ===
A Supreme Shura (Council) of the Provinces shall be formed, composed of representatives of the Provincial councils (shuras), to prevent discrimination and ensure cooperation in the preparation of development and welfare programs for the provinces and to supervise their coordinated implementation. The law shall determine how this shura shall be formed and what its responsibilities shall be.

=== Article 102 ===
The Supreme council of the Provinces has the right to draft bills within its prerogative and submit them to the Islamic Shura Majlis directly or through the Government. These bills must be reviewed by the Majlis.

=== Article 103 ===
Provincial governors, city governors, district governors and other government-appointed officials of the country must obey the decisions of the shuras made within their prerogative.

=== Article 104 ===
In order to ensure Islamic justice and cooperation in the preparation of programs and to create harmony in the conduct of affairs in all production, industrial, and agricultural units, shuras will be formed consisting of representatives of workers, peasants and other employees and managers, and in educational, administrative, and service units and the like, councils (shuras) will be formed consisting of representatives of these units. The law shall determine how these councils are formed as well as the scope of their responsibilities and powers.

=== Article 105 ===
The decisions of the councils (shuras) must not contradict the criteria of Islam and the laws of the country.

=== Article 106 ===
The councils (shuras) may be dissolved only if they deviate from their legal duties. The law shall specify the body responsible for determining such deviation and how the councils (shuras) shall be dissolved and reconstituted. If a council (Shura) objects to its dissolution, it shall have the right to appeal to a competent court, and the court must consider its appeal out of turn.

== Chapter VIII [Article 107 to 112]: Leadership ==
=== Article 107 ===
The Leadership Experts Majlis - after the Marja-e Taqlid and leader of Islam’s universal revolution and founder of the Islamic Republic of Iran, Ayatollah-al Uzma Imam Khomeini who was acknowledged and accepted as a Marja and Leader by the vast majority of the people - these Experts elected by the people shall be entrusted with the task of designating the Leader.

The experts of the Leadership Experts Majlis shall examine and discuss all the fuqaha who possess the qualifications referred to in Articles 5 and 109. If they come to the conclusion that one of them is the most knowledgeable in Islamic rulings and the subjects of fiqh or in political and social issues or enjoys general popularity or has special distinction in any of the qualifications mentioned in Article 109, they shall elect him as the Leader or otherwise they shall elect and declare one of them as the Leader.

The Leader elected by the Experts shall assume the Wilayat-ul Amr and all the responsibilities arising from it. The leader shall be equal before the law to the rest of the people of the country.

==== Background and comments ====
Before the 1989 amendments to the constitution, Article 107 called for the leader to be someone who was "accepted as a marja' and Leader by a decisive majority of the people", and if such a person could not be found, to appoint a "leadership council" made up of marja' In his book Islamic Government: Guardianship of the Jurist, Khomeini had argued that "only the most senior religious jurists -- not just any cleric -- had the scholastic expertise and the educational training to fully comprehend the intricacies of Islamic jurisprudence." According to historian Ervand Abrahamian, the original constitution also declared that "the leadership clauses, especially those stipulating that ultimate authority resides in the senior religious jurists [marja'], were to endure until the Mahdi, the Lord of the Age, reappears on earth."

They were amended nonetheless because the Assembly of Experts that would choose the next leader knew "well that the senior jurists distrusted their version of Islam", i.e. Khomeini and his supporters interpretation of Islam. Abrahamian argues that this "unwittingly undermined the intellectual foundations" of the jurist's roll as guardian. Another scholar (Olivier Roy) called the change "an end to the logic of the Islamic revolution" for the same reason.

=== Article 108 ===
During the first term, the law specifying the number and qualifications of the Experts and the manner of their election, as well as the Internal Statute regulating their meetings, shall be prepared and ratified by the majority of votes of the fuqaha of the first Shura-ye Negahban, and then approved by the Leader of the Revolution. After that, the Leadership Majlis shall have the authority to make any amendments or revisions to this law or to approve any other provisions concerning the duties of the Experts.

=== Article 109 ===
Essential Qualifications and Attributes of Leader:

1. Having the scholarly qualification required for issuing fatwas in different fields of fiqh.
2. Having the justice and piety necessary for the leadership of the Islamic Ummah.
3. Having the right political and social discernment, ingenuity, courage, management qualities and the necessary leadership ability.

If there are more than one person having the above-mentioned qualifications, preference shall be given to the person with the better fiqhi and political discernment.

=== Article 110 ===
Responsibilities and Powers of Leader:

1. Determining the general policies of the Islamic Republic of Iran after consultation with the Expediency Discernment Council.
2. Supervising the proper execution of the general policies of the State.
3. Issuing the decree for referendum.
4. Commanding the Armed Forces.
5. Declaring war and peace and mobilizing the Armed Forces.
6. Appointing, dismissing and accepting the resignation of:
  1. fuqaha of the Shura-ye Negahban
  2. Highest-ranking official of the Judiciary (Judiciary Chief)
  3. President of the Islamic Republic of Iran Broadcasting (IRIB)
  4. Chief of Staff of the Armed Forces.
  5. Commander of the Islamic Revolution Guards Corps.
  6. High-ranking commanders of the military and police forces.
7. Resolving differences between the three branches of government and coordinating their relations.
8. Resolving through the Expediency Discernment Council the problems of the State that cannot be settled via conventional proceedings.
9. Signing the decree of the President after his election by the people. The qualification of candidates for the Presidency with regard to the conditions specified in the Constitution must be confirmed before elections by the Shura-ye Negahban and in the first term by the Leader.
10. Dismissing the President with due attention to the interests of the country after the Supreme Court finds him guilty of violating his constitutional duties or after the Islamic Shura Majlis votes to establish his incompetence based on Article 89 of the Constitution.
11. Pardoning or reducing the sentences of convicts, within the framework of Islamic criteria, upon the recommendations of the Judiciary Chief.

The Leader may delegate some of his responsibilities and powers to another person.

=== Article 111 ===
Dismissal of Leader If the Leader becomes incapable of fulfilling his legal duties or loses any of the qualifications referred to in Articles 5 and 109 or it is found that he did not possess some of the qualifications from the beginning, he shall be removed from office. Jurisdiction in this matter is vested in the Experts specified in Article 108.

In the event of the death, resignation or removal of the Leader, the Experts are responsible for designating and appointing a new Leader as soon as possible.

Until the new Leader is introduced, a shura consisting of the President, the Judiciary Chief, and one of the fuqaha of the Shura-ye Negahban, selected by the Expediency Council, shall provisionally assume all of the duties of the Leader, and if during this period one of them is unable to fulfill the duties for any reason, another person shall be appointed in his place, while maintaining the majority of the fuqaha (in the shura).

This council shall act with respect to the duties referred to in Paragraphs 1, 3, 5, and 10 and Sections (iv), (v), and (vi) of Paragraph 6 of Article 110, upon the approval of three-fourths of the members of the Expediency Council. Whenever the Leader, due to his illness or any other event, temporarily becomes unable to perform the duties of leadership, the council mentioned in this Article shall assume his duties during that time.

=== Article 112 ===
The Convention for the Expediency Discernment of the State shall meet, upon the order of the Leader, to determine the expediencies of the State in cases where the Shura-ye Negahban finds a bill passed by the Islamic Shura Majlis to be contrary to the criteria of the sharia’ or the Constitution and the Majlis fails to meet the expectations of the Shura-ye Negahban, and also to consult on any issue referred to it by the Leader, and to perform other duties mentioned in this Constitution.

The Leader shall appoint the permanent and non-permanent members of the Expediency Council. The rules of the Expediency Council shall be drawn up and approved by the Expediency Council members and confirmed by the Leader

== Chapter IX [Article 113 to 142]: Executive power (first section) ==
=== Article 113 ===
After the Leader, president is the highest-ranking official in the country and has the responsibility of implementing the Constitution and acting as the head of the Executive Branch, except in matters directly related to the Leadership.

=== Article 114 ===
The president is elected by direct popular vote for a four-year term and may be re-elected for only one consecutive term.

=== Article 115 ===
The president shall be elected from among religious and political rijal who have the following qualifications: Iranian origin, Iranian nationality, managerial capabilities and ingenuity, a clean record, trustworthiness and piety, faith and belief in the tenets of the Islamic Republic of Iran and the country’s official madhhab.

=== Article 116 ===
Candidates for the Presidency must officially declare their candidacy prior to the commencement of the election. The manner in which the President is elected shall be determined by law.

=== Article 117 ===
The President is elected by an absolute majority of the votes cast. However, if no candidate receives such a majority in the first round, a second round is held on the Friday of the following week. Only the two candidates who received the most votes in the first round will participate in the second round. However, if some of the candidates who received the most votes in the first round withdraw from the election, the two candidates who received more votes than the others will be presented as candidates for the second round.

=== Article 118 ===
The responsibility of supervising the presidential election, according to Article 99, lies with the Shura-ye Negahban, but until the first Shura-ye Negahban is established, it is the responsibility of a supervisory body to be determined by law.

=== Article 119 ===
The election of a new President must be held no later than one month before the termination of the outgoing President’s term and the outgoing President shall perform the presidential duties in the interim period between the election of the new President and the end of the outgoing President’s term.

=== Article 120 ===
If one of the candidates whose qualification has been established in accordance with this Constitution dies within ten days before the date of the election, the election shall be postponed for two weeks. If one of the candidates who received the most votes dies between the first and second rounds of voting, the period for holding the election shall be extended by two weeks.

=== Article 121 ===
The president shall take the following oath and add his signature to it at a session of the Islamic Shura Majlis held in the presence of the Judiciary Chief and the members of the Shura-ye Negahban:

“In, the Name of Allāh, the Compassionate, the Merciful, as President, I swear by God the Almighty the Exalted, before the Holy Quran and the Iranian nation, that I will protect the country’s official religion, the establishment of the Islamic Republic, and the country’s Constitution, will devote all my abilities and capacities to fulfilling the responsibilities that I have assumed, will devote myself to serving the people, uplifting the country, promoting religion and morality and supporting the truth and justice, will refrain from any form of despotism, will protect the freedom and dignity of the citizens and the rights granted to them by the Constitution, will spare no effort to protect the country’s borders and its political, economic and cultural independence, and by seeking the help of God and following the Prophet of Islam and the Infallible Imams (sawas) and as a pious and selfless trustee, will safeguard the authority entrusted to me by the people as a sacred trust and transfer it to whomever the people may elect after me.”.

=== Article 122 ===
The president is responsible to the people, to the Leader and to the Islamic Shura Majlis within the limits of the powers and duties assigned to him by the Constitution or the ordinary laws.

=== Article 123 ===
The President shall have the duty to sign the laws passed by the Majlis or as the results of referenda, after the legal procedures have been completed and they have been communicated to him and shall forward them to the [relevant] authorities for implementation.

=== Article 124 ===
The president may have Vice-Presidents for [assistance in] the performance of his legal duties. With the approval of the President, the First Vice-President shall have the responsibility of administering the affairs of the Cabinet of Ministers and coordinating the other Vice-Presidencies.

=== Article 125 ===
The President or his legal representative shall sign treaties, conventions, agreements and contracts between the government of Iran and other governments as well as pacts pertaining to international organizations, after they have been approved by the Islamic Shura Majlis.

=== Article 126 ===
The President is directly responsible for the country’s national planning and budget affairs as well as state employment matters, and may delegate their administration to others.

=== Article 127 ===
In special situations, if necessary, the President may with the approval of the Cabinet of Ministers, appoint one or more special representatives with specific powers. In such cases, the decisions of the said representative or representatives shall be considered the same as those of the President and the Cabinet of Ministers.

=== Article 128 ===
Ambassadors are appointed upon the recommendation of the Minister of Foreign Affairs and the approval of the President. The President signs the credentials of ambassadors and receives the credentials of ambassadors of other countries.

=== Article 129 ===
The awarding of state decorations shall be the responsibility of the President.

=== Article 130 ===
Resignation of the President The president shall submit his resignation to the Leader and shall continue to perform his duties until his resignation is accepted.

=== Article 131 ===
In case of death, dismissal, resignation, absence or illness of the president that lasts more than two months, or in case his term of office has expired and a new president has not been elected due to some impediments, or other similar circumstances, the First Vice President shall assume the powers and responsibilities of the President with the approval of the Leader, and a council consisting of the Speaker of the Islamic Shura Majlis, Judiciary Chief, and the First Vice-President shall be obliged to arrange for the election of a new President within a maximum period of fifty days.

In case of the death of the First Vice-President or other circumstances that prevent him from performing his duties, or if the President does not have a First Vice President, the Leader shall appoint another person in his place.

=== Article 132 ===
During the period in which the powers and duties of the president are transferred to the First Vice-President or to another person appointed in accordance with Article 131, the Ministers may not be impeached, nor may a vote of no confidence be passed against them, nor may a measure be taken for the revision of the Constitution or for the holding of referenda.

=== Article 133 ===
Ministers shall be appointed by the president and presented to the Majlis for a vote of confidence. If the Majlis changes, a new vote of confidence shall not be required. The number of ministers and their areas of responsibility shall be determined by law.

=== Article 134 ===
The president shall preside over the Cabinet of Ministers, supervise the work of the Ministers, take the necessary measures to coordinate the decisions of the Ministers and the Cabinet and in cooperation with the Ministers, determine the program and course of action of the Government and implement the laws. In the case of disagreement or interference with the legal duties of government bodies, the decision of the Cabinet of Ministers, taken on the proposal of the President, shall be binding, unless there is a need for interpretation or amendment of laws. The President is responsible to the Majlis for the actions of the Cabinet of Ministers.

=== Article 135 ===
The ministers shall remain in office unless they are dismissed or receive a vote of no confidence from the Majlis as a result of their impeachment or a motion of no confidence against them. The resignation of the Cabinet of Ministers or any of its members shall be submitted to the President and the Cabinet of Ministers shall continue to perform its duties until a new Government is appointed. The President may appoint a caretaker minister for the ministries without a minister for a period not exceeding three months.

=== Article 136 ===
The president may dismiss ministers, and if he does so, he must obtain a vote of confidence from the Majlis for the new minister or ministers. If half of the members of the Cabinet of Ministers change after the government has received a vote of confidence from the Majlis, the President must seek a new vote of confidence for the Cabinet of Ministers from the Majlis.

=== Article 137 ===
Each Minister is responsible to the president and the Majlis for his specific duties and in matters approved by the Cabinet of Ministers, he is also responsible for the actions of the others.

=== Article 138 ===
In addition to the cases in which the Cabinet of Ministers or one of the Ministers is charged with drafting regulations for the implementation of laws, the Cabinet of Ministers is authorized to issue rules and regulations for the performance of its administrative duties, for ensuring the implementation of laws, and for regulating administrative organizations. Each minister is also authorized to issue regulations and circulars on matters within the scope of his duties and in accordance with the decisions of the Cabinet of Ministers, but the content of such regulations must not violate the letter or spirit of the law. The Government may delegate the approval of some matters related to its functions to committees composed of some Ministers. The ratifications of these committees within the rules shall be binding once they are approved by the President. The ratifications and regulations of the Government and the decisions of the committees referred to in this Article, in addition to being communicated for implementation, shall be brought to the attention of the Speaker of the Islamic Shura Majlis so that if he finds them contrary to the law, he shall send them to the Cabinet of Ministers for reconsideration, stating the reasons.

=== Article 139 ===
The settlement of disputes concerning public and state property or their submission to arbitration shall require the approval of the Cabinet of Ministers and shall be notified to the Majlis. In cases where the party to the dispute is a foreigner and in important domestic cases, the Majlis must also approve (the settlement of the dispute). Important cases are determined by law.

=== Article 140 ===
Charges against the president, Vice Presidents and Ministers shall be investigated by ordinary courts and brought to the knowledge of the Islamic Shura Majlis.

=== Article 141 ===
The president, Vice Presidents, Ministers and Government employees may not hold more than one government position, and they are prohibited from holding any other position in institutions whose capital is wholly or partly owned by the Government or public institutions, from being a member of the Islamic Shura Majlis, from practicing law or working as a legal advisor and from holding the position of president, managing director or member of the board of directors of any type of private company, except cooperative companies affiliated to the government ministries and institutions. Teaching positions in universities and research institutions are exempt from this rule.

=== Article 142 ===
The assets of the Leader, the president, the Vice Presidents, the Ministers, and their spouses and children shall be audited by the Judiciary Chief before and after their term of office to ensure that they have not increased unrightfully.

== Chapter IX [Article 143 to 151]: Executive power (second section) ==
=== Article 143 ===
The Army of the Islamic Republic of Iran is responsible for safeguarding the independence and territorial integrity of the country and the State of the Islamic Republic.

=== Article 144 ===
The Army of the Islamic Republic of Iran must be an Islamic army that is devoted to Islam and is popular and must recruit into its service individuals who believe in the goals of the Islamic Revolution who make sacrifices on the path to its realization.

=== Article 145 ===
No foreign individual may be admitted to the Army or the security forces of the country.

=== Article 146 ===
Establishment of any kind of foreign military base in the country, even if it is in the name of peaceful purposes, is prohibited.

=== Article 147 ===
In times of peace, the Government shall utilize the personnel and technical equipment of the Army in relief operations, educational and production activities, and Jihad of Construction, in full compliance with the criteria of Islamic justice and to the extent that it does not undermine combat readiness.

=== Article 148 ===
Any form of personal use of Army equipment and facilities and the use of Army personnel as personal servants, chauffeurs or the like is prohibited.

=== Article 149 ===
Promotion and removal of military ranks shall be in accordance with the law.

=== Article 150 ===
The Islamic Revolutionary Guard Corps, which was established in the early days of the victory of the revolution, shall remain in existence to continue its role of guarding the Revolution and its achievements. The scope of the duties and areas of responsibility of this Corps in relation to the duties and areas of responsibility of the other armed forces shall be determined by law, with an emphasis on brotherly cooperation and concord among them.

=== Article 151 ===
Based on the Surah 8:60 (“Mobilize against them whatever you can of power and war-horses, awing thereby the enemy of Allāh and your enemy and others after them whom you do not know but Allāh knows well”), the Government is obligated to provide a program and necessary facilities for military training for all citizens, in accordance with Islamic criteria, so that all citizens will always be able to participate in the armed defense of the country and the State of the Islamic Republic, but the possession of arms requires the permission of the relevant authorities

== Chapter X [Article 152 to 155]: Foreign policy ==
=== Article 152 ===
The foreign policy of the Islamic Republic of Iran is based upon the rejection of all forms of domination, both the exertion of it and submission to it, the preservation of the independence of the country in all respects and its territorial integrity, the defence of the rights of all Muslims, non-alignment with respect to the hegemonic superpowers, and the maintenance of mutually peaceful relations with all non-belligerent States.

=== Article 153 ===
Any form of agreement resulting in foreign control over the natural resources, economy, army, or culture of the country, as well as other aspects of the national life, is forbidden.

=== Article 154 ===
The ideal of the Islamic Republic of Iran is independence, justice, truth, and felicity among all people of the world. Accordingly, it supports the just struggles of the Mustad'afun (oppressed) against the Mustakbirun (oppressors) in every corner of the globe.

=== Article 155 ===
The government of the Islamic Republic of Iran may grant political asylum to those who seek it and are worthy of it.

== Chapter XI [Article 156 to 174]: Judicial Branch ==
=== Article 156 ===
The Judiciary is an independent branch of government that is the defender of individual and social rights, responsible for the establishment of justice and charged with the following duties:

1. Investigating and adjudicating complaints, violations of rights and grievances, resolving disputes and taking necessary decisions and actions in customary matters as the law determines
2. Restoring public rights and upholding justice and lawful liberties
3. Overseeing the proper enforcement of laws
4. Detecting crimes, prosecuting, punishing and disciplining criminals and implementing the punishments and provisions of the Islamic penal code
5. Adopting appropriate measures to prevent the occurrence of crime and to reform criminals.

=== Article 157 ===
In order to fulfill the responsibilities of the Judiciary in all judicial, administrative and executive matters, the Leader appoints a just mujtahid [ possessing the level of authoritative reasoning as a faqih ] who is well versed in judicial matters and possesses management skills and prudence as the head of the Judiciary for a period of five years and he shall be the highest judicial authority.

=== Article 158 ===
The Judiciary Chief shall have the following responsibilities:

1. Establishment of the necessary organizational structure in the administration of justice commensurate with the responsibilities set forth in Article 156
2. Preparation of judiciary bills appropriate for the Islamic Republic
3. Hiring of just and meritorious judges and their dismissal, appointment, transfer, assignment to duties, promotion and similar administrative duties, in accordance with the law.

=== Article 159 ===
The courts of justice shall be the official bodies to which complaints and lawsuits shall be submitted. The formation of courts and the determination of their jurisdiction shall be specified by law.

=== Article 160 ===
The Minister of Justice shall be responsible for all matters relating to the relationship of the Judiciary with the Executive and Legislative Branches and shall be selected from among persons proposed to the president by the Judiciary Chief.

The Judiciary Chief may delegate to the Minister of Justice full financial and administrative authority and the authority to employ personnel other than judges. In this case, the Minister of Justice shall have the same powers and responsibilities as the other ministers in their capacity as the most senior government executives.

=== Article 161 ===
The Supreme Court shall be established to supervise the proper implementation of the laws in the courts, to ensure the uniformity of judicial proceedings and to perform other duties assigned to it by law, in accordance with the regulations issued by the Judiciary Chief.

=== Article 162 ===
The Head of the Supreme Court and the Prosecutor General must be mujtahids who are just and well versed in judicial matters and are appointed by the Judiciary Chief in consultation with the judges of the Supreme Court for a period of five years.

=== Article 163 ===
The qualities and qualifications of a judge are determined by law in accordance with fiqhi criteria.

=== Article 164 ===
A judge may not be temporarily or permanently removed from the position he occupies without a trial and proof of guilt or of an offense that would result in his dismissal, nor may he be transferred or reassigned without his consent, except when it is in the interest of society, (and that shall be) by decision of the Judiciary Chief after consultation with the Head of the Supreme Court and the Prosecutor General. The periodic transfer and rotation of judges shall be in accordance with the general rules established by law.

=== Article 165 ===
Trials shall be open to the public unless the court determines that an open trial would be prejudicial to public morals or discipline, or in the case of a private dispute, the parties request that the trial not be open.

=== Article 166 ===
The judgments of the courts must be well reasoned and documented with reference to the articles and principles of law under which they are rendered.

=== Article 167 ===
The judge must endeavor to judge each case on the basis of the codified law, and if he cannot find it in the law, he must base his judgments on authoritative Islamic sources and authoritative fatwas. He may not refuse to accept, examine, and rule on cases on the pretext of the silence or absence of the law in the matter or its brevity or inconsistencies in the laws.

=== Article 168 ===
The trial of political and press offenses shall be public and in the presence of a jury in a court of law. The law shall determine the manner of selection of the jury, its powers and the definition of political crimes in accordance with Islamic criteria.

=== Article 169 ===
No act or omission shall be deemed to be a criminal offence by virtue of a law subsequently enacted.

=== Article 170 ===
Judges must refrain from implementing administrative laws and regulations that contradict Islamic laws and regulations or are outside the authority of the Executive Branch and anyone may petition the Administrative Justice Court to annul such laws.

=== Article 171 ===
In the event that a person suffers a material or moral loss as a result of a judge’s interpretation or error regarding the subject matter of a case or the verdict rendered, or the application of a rule in a particular case, the judge shall be liable for compensating the loss in accordance with Islamic criteria, if it is a case of (the judge’s) error. Otherwise, the loss shall be compensated by the state. In any case, the defendant’s reputation and good name shall be restored.

=== Article 172 ===
Military courts shall be established in accordance with the law to investigate crimes committed by members of the Army, Gendarmerie, Police, and Islamic Revolutionary Guard Corps in connection with their special military or security duties. However, their ordinary crimes or crimes committed while serving as officials of the Minister of Justice shall be tried by general courts. The Military Prosecutor’s Office and the military courts are part of the country’s judiciary and are subject to the same principles related to this branch of power.

=== Article 173 ===
A court called the Administrative Justice Court shall be established under the supervision of the Judiciary Chief in order to investigate people’s complaints, grievances and objections against Government officials, organs, or statutes and to restore their rights. The powers of this court and its mode of operation shall be determined by law.

=== Article 174 ===
On the basis of the Judiciary’s right to supervise the proper conduct of affairs and the correct enforcement of laws by administrative bodies, an organization called the National Inspection Organization shall be established under the supervision of the Judiciary Chief. The powers and duties of this organization will be determined by law.

== Chapter XII [Article 175]: Islamic Republic of Iran Broadcasting ==
=== Article 175 ===
In the Islamic Republic of Iran Broadcasting (IRIB), freedom of expression and dissemination of ideas must be ensured in accordance with Islamic criteria and the best interests of the country. The appointment and dismissal of the head of the Islamic Republic of Iran Broadcasting is vested in the Leader. A council comprising two representatives each of the president, the Judiciary Chief and the Islamic Shura Majlis shall supervise the organization. The policies and methods of managing and supervising the organization shall be determined by law.

== Chapter XIII [Article 176]: Supreme Council for National Security ==
=== Article 176 ===
In order to protect the national interests and safeguard the Islamic Revolution, territorial integrity and national sovereignty, a Supreme National Security council headed by the president shall be established with the following responsibilities:

- Determining the defense and national security strategies of the country within the parameters of the general policies set by the Leader.
- Coordinating political, intelligence, social, cultural and economic activities with regard to the overall defense and security strategies.
- Using the country's material and intellectual resources to confront internal and external threats.

The council is composed of the following:

- Heads of the three branches of government (president, speaker of the parliament and chief justice)
- Chief of the General Staff of the Armed Forces
- Chief of Planning and Budget Affairs
- Two representatives selected by the Leader
- Ministers of Foreign Affairs, Interior and Intelligence
- The minister related with each case and the highest-ranking officials of the Army and the Islamic Revolution Guards Corps

The Supreme National Security council shall form sub-council such as the Defense council and the National Security council, in accordance with its duties. Each of these sub-councils shall be headed by the president or a member of the Supreme National Security council designated by the President.

The scope of authority and responsibilities of the sub-councils shall be determined by law, and their structure shall be approved by the Supreme National Security council.

The decisions of the Supreme National Security council shall become effective upon confirmation by the Leader.

== Chapter XIV [Article 177]: Revisions ==
To revise the constitution, the Leader must "issue an edict to the President after consultation with the Nation's Exigency Council stipulating the amendments or additions to be made by the Council for Revision of the Constitution which consists of:

1. Members of the Guardian Council.
2. Heads of the three branches of the government.
3. Permanent members of the Nation's Exigency Council.
4. Five members from among the Assembly of Experts.
5. Ten representatives selected by the Leader.
6. Three representatives from the Council of Ministers.
7. Three representatives from the judiciary branch.
8. Ten representatives from among the members of the Islamic Consultative Assembly.
9. Three representatives from among the university professors.

Whatever this Council and the Leader agree on will be put to a national referendum and amend the constitution if it receives an absolute majority vote. (Unlike referenda under Article 59, where referendum must be approved by a supermajority of the Islamic Consultative Assembly before going to a vote.)

Parts of the constitution that cannot be amended: "Articles of the Constitution related to the Islamic character of the political system; the basis of all the rules and regulations according to Islamic criteria; the religious footing; the objectives of the Islamic Republic of Iran; the democratic character of the government; the wilayat al-'amr; the Imamate of Ummah; and the administration of the affairs of the country based on national referenda, official religion of Iran [Islam] and the school [Twelver Ja'fari]".

=== Comment ===
This article itself was a revision to the Constitution, so the constitution was amended in 1989 without this chapter allowing amendments being a part of the constitution.

== See also ==
- 1989 Iranian constitutional referendum
- Blasphemy laws of the Islamic Republic of Iran
- December 1979 Iranian constitutional referendum
- Iran Constitution of 1906
- Iranian Islamic Republic Day
- Iranian Revolution
- List of members of Constitutional Amendment Council of Iran
- Politics of Iran
- Sharia
