= 1979 Iranian Islamic Republic referendum =

Islamic Republic referendum
- 30–31 March 1979
- In the Name of God, the Exalted; Provisional Government of the Islamic Revolution; Ministry of Interior; Referendum Ballot; Changing the former regime to an Islamic Republic, the constitution of which shall be submitted to the nation for approval.
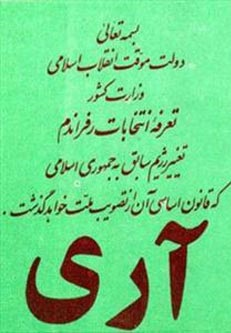
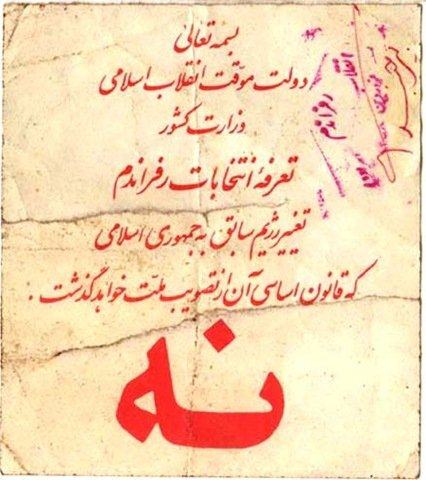
- The two-part ballot of the referendum, with the green paper (left) indicating "Yes" and red paper (right) indicating "No" in Persian.
- Outcome: Iran becomes an Islamic republic

Results
Choice	Votes	%
Yes	20,147,855	99.31%
No	140,996	0.69%
Total votes	20,288,851	100.00%
Registered voters/turnout	~22,000,000	89%

A referendum on establishing an Islamic republic was held in Iran on 30 and 31 March 1979. It took place in the aftermath of the Iranian Revolution, which led to the overthrow of the Pahlavi dynasty on 11 February 1979 and the rise of Ayatollah Ruhollah Khomeini as Iran's de facto leader. Voters were asked whether the country should be transformed into an "Islamic Republic", to replace the outgoing Imperial State. The proposal was approved by an overwhelming majority, although the result was marred by boycotts and disputes over electoral interference.

Following the referendum, the Persian Constitution of 1906 was declared invalid, and a new constitution based on Sharia law and the doctrine of velayat-e-faqih was drafted and ratified by a further referendum on 3 December 1979.

== Voting process ==
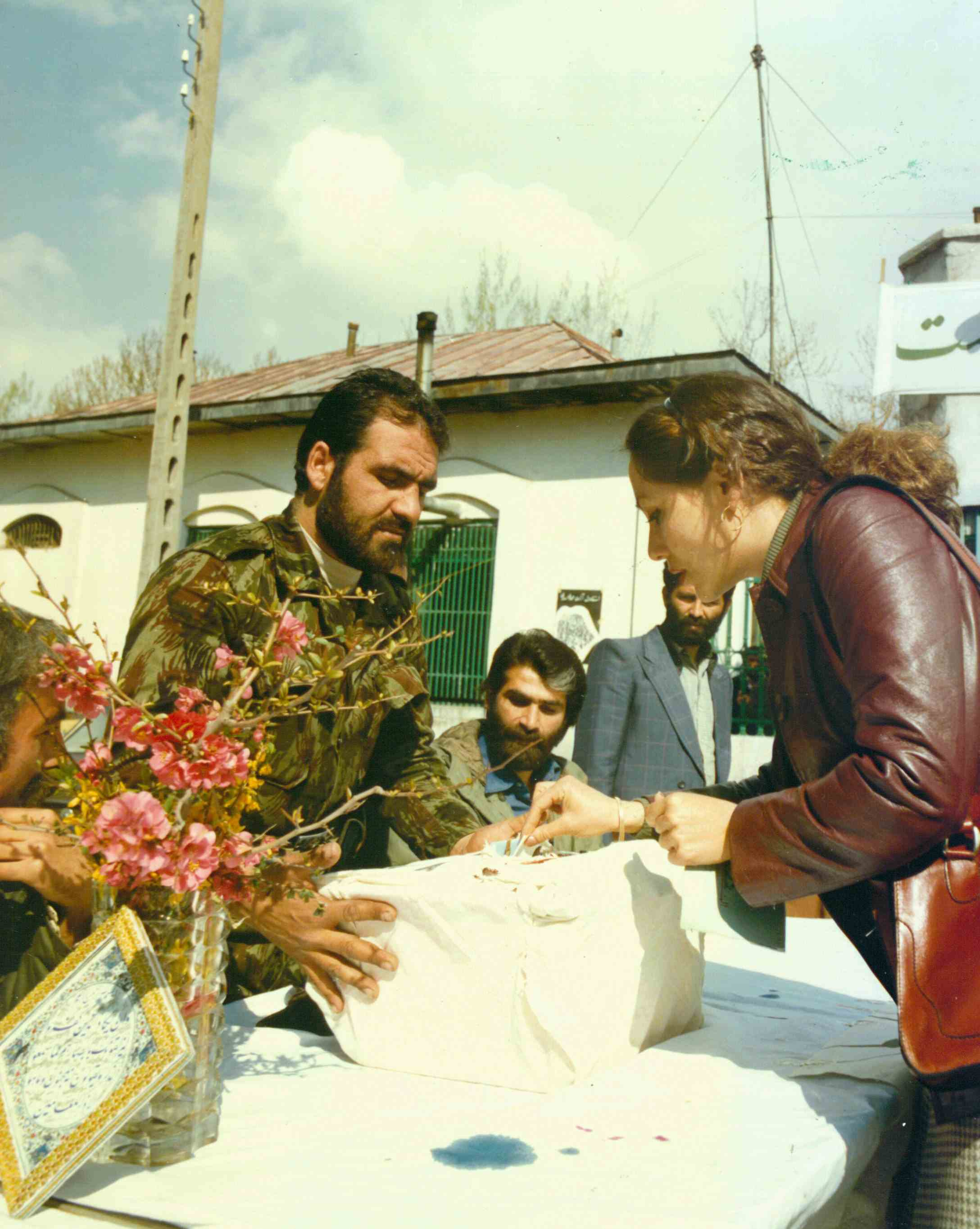
Woman casting her vote

Voters were given a three-part ballot, two of which (the "Yes" and "No" sections) contained the following statement:

بسمه تعالی
دولت موقّت انقلاب اسلامی
وزارت کشور
تعرفهٔ انتخابات رفراندم
تغییر رژیم سابق به جمهوری اسلامی
که قانون اساسی آن از تصویب ملّت خواهد گذشت.

Translation:

In the Name of God, the Exalted
Provisional Government
of the Islamic Revolution
Ministry of Interior
Referendum Ballot
Changing the former regime to an Islamic Republic,
the constitution of which
shall be submitted to the nation for approval.

In order to include Iranian youth who participated in the revolution, the voting age was lowered from 18 to 16.

== Results ==
The measure to transform Iran into an "Islamic Republic" was approved by 98.2% of eligible voters. A high voter turnout was reported nationwide, except in Turkmen Sahra and Kurdistan, where the referendum was not fully held due to ongoing armed conflicts.

=== Dispute over legitimacy ===
Ahead of the referendum, the Interim Government of Iran invited a four-man delegation from International Association of Democratic Lawyers to monitor the voting process. Nuri Albala, a French member of the delegation, told The New York Times that "there were no booths, and voting was done in the presence of Islamic officials, often amid dozens of posters calling for a yes vote. There were many reports of polling officers tearing off the green‐colored "yes" portions of the ballots and stuffing them in the boxes on behalf of the voters...A number of young voters told reporters that they were afraid to openly vote no in the presence of so many others who felt otherwise". Similarly, a report by The Washington Post noted that polling places lacked private booths, and that the color-coded ballots could clearly be seen by the polling officers, prompting the head of the delegation to state that "this is not the way we do things in the West, and it does not meet our criteria of democracy". However, Michael Axworthy, author of Revolutionary Iran: A History of the Islamic Republic, states that "there may have been some irregularities in the referendum, but most balanced observers then and since have accepted that whatever the conditions, a referendum at that time with that question would always have given a massive majority for the same result", namely the end of the monarchy.

Numerous political parties, such as the National Democratic Front and the People's Fedai Guerrillas, boycotted both participation in and the results of the referendum. The People's Mojahedin Organization, the Tudeh Party, the Freedom Movement, the National Front, and the Muslim People's Republican Party, while approving the referendum, "objected to the imposition of Khomeini's choice".

== Party policies ==
Position	Organizations	Ref
Yes	Islamic Republican Party	
Yes	National Front	
Yes	Freedom Movement	
Yes	Tudeh Party	
Yes	People's Mojahedin Organization	
Yes	Muslim People's Republic Party	
Yes	Toilers Party	
Yes	Iran Party	
Yes	Pan-Iranist Party	
Yes	Nation Party	
Boycott	National Democratic Front	
Boycott	Organization of People's Fedai Guerrillas	
Boycott	People's Fedai Guerrillas	
Boycott	Peykar	
Boycott	Democratic Party of Iranian Kurdistan	
Boycott	Komala Party of Iranian Kurdistan	

== Statistics ==
Choice	Votes	%
For	20,147,855	99.3
Against	140,996	0.7
Valid Votes	20,288,851	100
Source: Nohlen et al

Choice	Votes
Number of Eligible Voters	20,857,391
Number of Actual Voters	20,440,108
Voter Turnout	98%
Source: Iran Social Science Data Portal

=== Results by province ===
Province	Votes		Proportion of votes	
Province	Yes	No	Yes	No
East Azerbaijan province	2,001,628	5,354	99.73%	0.27%
West Azerbaijan province	640,323	5,547	99.14%	0.86%
Isfahan province	1,357,605	4,470	99.67%	0.33%
Ilam province	161,942	16	99.99%	0.01%
Bakhtaran Province	612,830	6,159	99.00%	1.00%
Bushehr province	200,023	333	99.83%	0.17%
Tehran province	3,462,449	72,980	97.94%	2.06%
Chaharmahal and Bakhtiari province	210,936	885	99.58%	0.42%
Khorasan Province	1,983,458	6,712	99.66%	0.34%
Khuzestan province	1,248,591	8,557	99.32%	0.68%
Zanjan province	765,786	875	99.89%	0.11%
Semnan province	185,674	424	99.77%	0.23%
Sistan and Baluchestan province	314,319	1,052	99.67%	0.33%
Fars province	1,224,821	5,281	99.57%	0.43%
Kurdistan province	318,360	2,570	99.20%	0.80%
Kerman province	651,011	1,507	99.77%	0.23%
Kohgiluyeh and Boyer-Ahmad province	159,463	254	99.84%	0.16%
Gilan province	810,708	7,539	99.08%	0.92%
Lorestan province	643,216	821	99.87%	0.13%
Mazandaran province	1,205,501	3,871	99.68%	0.32%
Markazi province	771,189	1,052	99.86%	0.14%
Hormozgan province	252,791	3,842	98.50%	1.50%
Hamedan Province	744,636	1,023	99.86%	0.14%
Yazd province	241,024	187	99.92%	0.08%
Abroad	118,069	12,444	90.47%	9.53%
Total	20,286,353	153,755	99.25%	0.75%
Source: Ministry of Interior

== See also ==
- Iranian Islamic Republic Day
- 1979 Iranian constitutional referendum
