= Abortion in Iran =

Policies surrounding abortion in Iran have changed drastically between governments.

Abortion was first criminalized in 1926, twenty years after the establishment of a modern legal system. By 1979, during the Iranian Revolution, it was not considered illegal to abort fetuses less than twelve weeks old.

In April 2005, the Iranian Parliament approved a new bill easing the conditions by also allowing abortion in certain cases when the fetus shows signs of disability, and the Council of Guardians accepted the bill on 15 June 2005.

Abortion is currently legal in cases where the mother's life is in danger, and also in cases of fetal abnormalities that make it not viable after birth (such as anencephaly) or produce difficulties for the mother to take care of it after birth, such as major thalassemia or bilateral polycystic kidney disease. There is no need for a consent from the father and request and consent of mother with approval of three specialist physicians and final acceptance by legal medicine center suffices. Legal abortion is allowed only before 19th week of pregnancy.

Much of the controversy has historically stemmed from Iran's status as a theocracy as it was established after the 1979 revolution; many policies, including those concerning social topics, are based on sharia law as interpreted from the Qur'an through the nation's Shi'a legal philosophy. While abortion is not actually referenced in the Qur'an, infanticide is specifically condemned, and this has been used as an argument to keep abortion illegal in most or all cases in which it might be sought. The sections of the Qur'an that detail the importance of health for women have been used to combat this argument, and have been moderately successful at changing the legislation against abortion enacted after 1979. Nowadays, most Islamic legal schools of thought hold that the ensoulment of a fetus takes place four months after conception, which has extended the discussion of abortion in many nations and communities that base their judicial codes off of Islamic law; in Iran, a consensus has recently developed that abortion is legitimate if it is before this four-month mark.

Arguing for the legality or partial legality of abortion has the potential to be successful in Iran only if it is through religious discourse. All religious ruling in Iran has its final approval or veto assigned by the Guardian Council, a reviewing and regulatory body that has the ability to support or strike down all policies of Iran. In October 2021 a bill was proposed that would mandate local laboratories to report positive pregnancy tests in order to prevent "criminal abortions."

== History ==
=== Pre-Revolution ===
There is a long history of abortion in Iran. In medieval Iran, it was not shocking to have plant-based agents of abortion and their relative effectiveness listed in physicians' texts; other means of abortion were also described with warnings and instructions for treatment of the woman after the procedure. The dissemination and translation of different medical texts to and from China, India, Greece, and Persia led to attempts to develop extensive lists of all medical practices, including abortion, and the practice is described in detail in texts from many different regions. One text, written by physician and jurist Hakim Esmail Jorjani (1042-1137 AD), gives instruction for the appropriate use of natural abortifacients, with the caveat that these instructions are meant only for "a very young mother who fears she may die ... or when there is disease in the uterus". For a long time, abortion in Persia (and then Iran) was a legal gray area, which may explain why it was not uncommon to describe the correct procedure. Natural abortifacients continued to be used for centuries in Iran, and national law said little about the practice itself until European colonial and imperial intervention in the area. Because of this, up until the last years of the shah's regime, Iranian policy on abortion was partially based on parts of Islamic law and parts of law from the French colonial empire, which had carried influence in the region for some time.

The immediate pre-revolutionary period was full of stops and starts in terms of social policy and family planning in Iran, as the regime of Mohammad Reza Pahlavi fell in and out of favor with Iranians in quick fluctuation, eventually collapsing in the 1979 revolution. The pointed nationalism of the shah's government in the early 1960s made for a generally pronatal policy, as the White Revolution began to reform social and economic law; families were encouraged to have children, and the country was set to expand until the shah began a national family planning program in 1967, when the country's extreme population growth made officials worry about resources diminishing too quickly. Abortion became legal at that time under a set of circumstances and restrictions; in fact, a law passed in 1977 even allowed abortion on request. A law a year earlier "broadened access and granted an official license" for abortions to be performed in medical facilities such as clinics and hospitals. Abortions were legal so long as the pregnancy had not exceeded twelve weeks, the ensoulment period—or, if it had, so long as the mother's life was endangered specifically by carrying the child to term.

The conversation about abortion had begun even before the shah's family planning program in 1967, however; a new global interest in reproductive health and progress in contraception and sexual health matters led a gynecologist in Iran to receive a fatwa from Ayatollah Mahallati of Shiraz that approved of, and even encouraged, contraception with the aim of reducing unwanted pregnancies among Iranian families. One of the reasons the legality of abortion was debated in such open air at this time was that the number of women who had abortion declined in Iran in the 1960s due to increased use of contraceptives.

=== Post-Revolution ===
The 1991 law of Islamic Penalties stated that though abortion was still legally prohibited, it could be allowed to save the life of the mother. This law stands today as a background for further discourse on legalizing abortion in Iran. The legal medicine organization that had the ability to approve of the abortion of a fetus suffering from a specified list of problems was a bureaucratic system that made actual approval hard to obtain. Nearly half of the applicants in the 1999-2000 year were not accepted. Abortion is still haram, or forbidden, according to both Islamic law and to post-revolutionary Iranian law, and the punishments for providing or receiving an illegal abortion can be strict. Under current law, physicians can be sentenced to months of imprisonment, and women who get abortions before ensoulment are at the least fined blood money. In other cases, for example if the abortion takes place after ensoulment, the punishments are more severe: both woman and physician can be sentenced to up to ten years' imprisonment. This is because, after much debate over the possible legality of abortion in general, the 16-week limit (when ensoulment is believed to happen) was determined by all involved in that policymaking as the last possible time to have a legal abortion for any reason. Regardless of this baseline, the policies now in place regarding the legality of receiving or providing an abortion are vague in some places.

==== Recent developments ====
As a global trend, in recent years, it has become more common for members of relatively developed nations to bring up the question of selective abortion, as science about genetics and techniques for predicting and improving neonatal health has become both more advanced and more common. Iran has been no different; in fact, it is one of the few governments in the Middle East and North Africa that actively supports programs in sexual and reproductive health for its young people. While abortion remains technically illegal in most cases, and in all cases once the pregnancy passes the ensoulment time of 16 weeks, the government has expanded upon its earlier caveat concerning maternal health.

In 2005, the Legal Medicine Organization of Iran created a list of 29 fetal problems and 32 maternal issues in pregnancy that indicated that abortion might possibly be legal—only if, however, it was determined that the life of the mother and the fetus were both endangered if the pregnancy went through, and that the mother could be saved by an abortion. Ayatollah Ali Khamenei issued a fatwa to this effect, allowing abortion in the first trimester for these special cases. The Therapeutic Abortion Act of 2005, passed by the Iranian parliament, stated that if the reason for an abortion was not one of the 61 listed disorders or abnormalities, the cases could be referred to the physician and then the organization, which would decide on an appropriate course of action. The ambiguity of the guidelines for acceptance and the unpredictability of health during pregnancy, however, has not created much definition in the gray area that is Iranian abortion policy. In fact, the Guardian Council rejected the Therapeutic Abortion Act after its passage in 2005, adding to the confusion.

Today, most abortions happen "in unsafe and hazardous circumstances" because the penalties for receiving or giving an abortion can still be quite strict. Common reasons for getting an abortion range from fertility concerns (i. e., already having many children), possible or existing health complications, and socio-economic impediments to pregnancy, such as not being able to support another child. In a nation whose economy depends almost solely on oil, with 50% of revenue coming from those earnings, the distribution of wealth can be strained, and for many families it is not feasible to have many children despite the government's use of oil money to fund statewide welfare systems. With abortion counting for 5% of maternal deaths by some estimates, it is evident that illegal and unsupervised practice of the procedure does occur, and furthermore that it can be quite dangerous to the mother; and with 34% of surveyed pregnant Iranian women in one study reporting their pregnancies as "unintended", it has been noted that the danger has not disappeared in the shift from firm illegality and condemnation of abortion in Iran to its place in a current legal limbo.

== Statistics and trends ==
Abortions in Tehran
1. married women (7.50%)
2. unmarried women (19.5%)
*for every 1000 women

The abortion rate in Iran is contested, and many surveys on the topic land with estimated numbers as opposed to hard data. This is due not only to the inherent difficulty in reaching all populations of Iran, which is a diverse country with large groups of the poor and rural, but also because of the sensitivity of the issue; especially in highly religious groups, the questioning about abortion trends is difficult, and the on-and-off receipt of honest answers has the potential to skew data in a way that makes real conclusions rather vague.

The abortion rate does vary significantly among Iran's provinces, but estimates include 0.26 lifetime abortions per Iranian woman, an estimated 73,000 a year, 27 abortions per 1000 women and 7.5 abortions per 1000 married women, and 11,543 abortions annually in Tehran, the nation's capital. These statistics are as scholarly accepted as other quite dissimilar ones, such as one study's claim that more than a thousand unsafe abortions "take place every day in Iran" and another that reports that 100,000 younger women have illegal or induced abortions annually. The exact numbers on abortion in Iran are thus unknown, but there are some trends in the practice that have been widely reported and verified.

All over the world, there is a negative correlation between the use of contraceptives and the abortion rate; as the world adapts to new and accessible technologies developed for family planning and reproductive health, Iran is one of many nations that has found a lower rate of abortion in those areas that have higher rates of contraceptive use, which accounts for governmental acceptance and support of family planning and sexual health programs for the young. Additionally, ardent religious objections against the practice of abortion have become less legitimate in the eyes of many, especially in the middle and higher classes of Iran, as developments such as pre-natal genetic testing make abortion more of a viable option in the case of a difficult pregnancy.

== See also ==
- Abortion law
- Islam and abortion
- Women's rights in Iran
- Women's rights movement in Iran
