= Fazlollah Mousavi =

Iranian politician (born c. 1953)

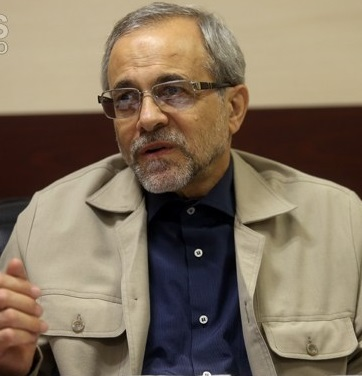

Member of the Parliament of Iran
- In office 28 May 2004 – 28 May 2008
- Constituency: Tehran, Rey, Shemiranat and Eslamshahr
- Majority: 530,301 (26.89%)

Personal details
- Born: Seyyed Fazlollah Mousavi c. 1953 (age 72–73) Isfahan, Iran
- Occupation: Academic
- Profession: Jurist

Sayyid Fazlollah Mousavi (Persian: سید فضل‌الله موسوی) is an Iranian conservative jurist and politician who was the former jurist member of the Guardian Council from 2016 to 2022.

He served as a member of the Parliament of Iran from 2004 to 2008, representing Tehran, Rey, Shemiranat, and Eslamshahr.
