= Hadi Tahan Nazif =

Member of Iran's Guardian Council

Hadi Tahan Nazif (Persian: هادی طحان نظیف, born 1983) was born in Dezful during the war between Iran and Iraq and is the youngest member of The Islamic Republic of Iran's Guardian Council. He was nominated for a seat as a legal expert in 2019 by the Head of the Judiciary after years of serving as a secretary for the Council.

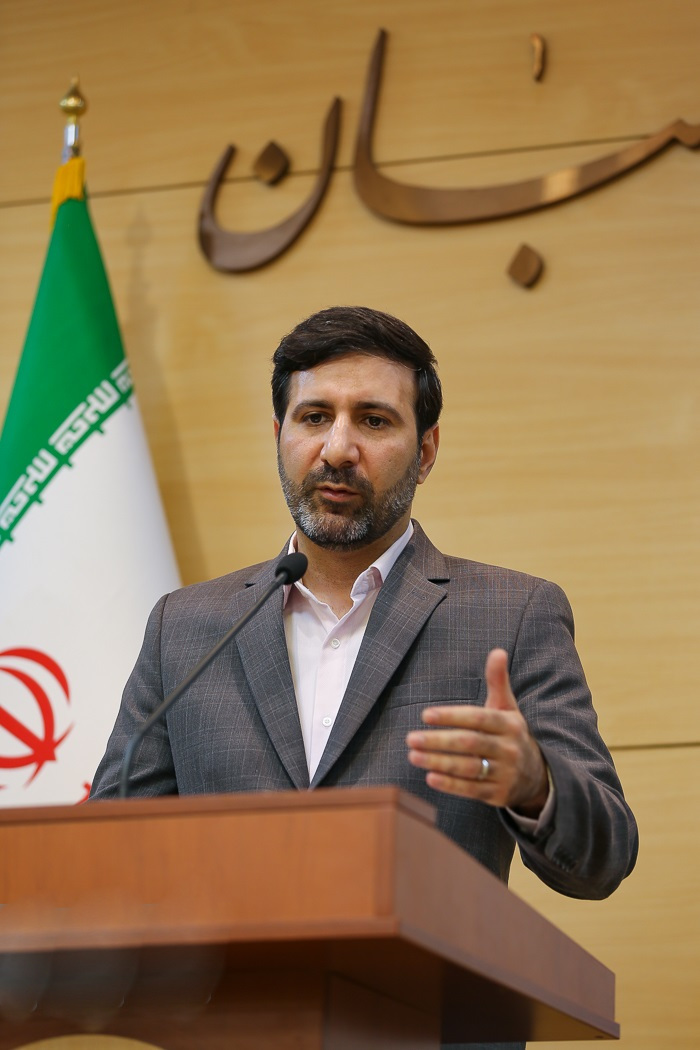
Hadi Tahan Nazif during a press conference, 12 February 2022

== Early life ==
Hadi Tahan Nazif was born in the city of Dezful in Khuzestan province in 1983.

=== Academic background ===
Nazif holds an undergraduate degree specializing in law from Imam Sadiq University In 2013, he completed a PhD from the University of Tehran.

While studying, Nazif was mentored by Professor Abbas-Ali Kadkhodaie who helped him to enter government. Kadkhodaie was the right-hand man of Ahmad Jannati in the Guardian Council when he became Nazif’s PhD adviser.

== Career ==
In 2008, while working on his PhD, Nazif became a member of Mahmoud Ahmadinejad’s government as deputy for Legal and Parliamentary Affairs.

Upon completion of his PhD, Nazif gained membership to the Scientific Board of Legal Rights of Imam Sadiq University and became the educational deputy of the law faculty.

Nazif also worked as a secretary for the Guardian Council. For about ten years he was working alongside both Ahmad Jannati and Abbas-Ali Kadkhodaie, the Secretary and Spokesperson of the Council, recording the minutes of sessions and arranging the agenda for Guardian Council meetings.

In 2019 Nazif was nominated by the Head of the Judiciary, Ebrahim Raisi, for a position as a legal scholar on the Guardian Council. In June 2019, when Nazif was just 36 years old, he was voted into the Guardian Council by members of Iran's Parliament (Majles) as its youngest member.
