= Ahmad Hosseini Khorasani =

Iranian Ayatollah (born 1959)

Ayatollah Seyyed Ahmad Hosseini Khorasani
- احمد حسینی خراسانی
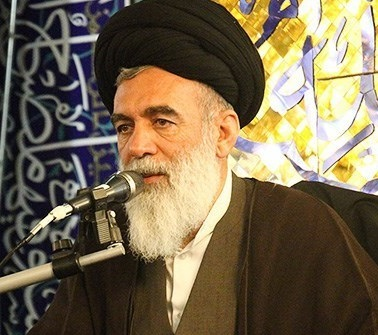

Member of the Assembly of Experts
- Incumbent
- Assumed office 24 May 2016
- Constituency: Razavi Khorasan Province
- Majority: 1,180,249

Personal details
- Born: 1959 (age 66–67) Shirvan, Iran

Ahmad Hosseini Khorasani (Persian: احمد حسینی خراسانی) is an Iranian Twelver Shia ayatollah who was born in 1959 Fajr-Abad (Shirvan). He is a member of Guardian Council and also representative of Razavi Khorasan Province people in Assembly of Experts.

Seyyed Ahmad Hosseini-Khorasani whose current dwelling place is in Qom, is the representative of Khorasan Razavi people in the Assembly of experts. This Shia cleric who is the son of Mirza-Arab, went to "Ayatollah-Hakim Hawzah" in Shirvan, afterwards departed to Mashhad (seminary); and was educating by the side of scholars/teachers such as: Falsafi, Mortazavi and RezaZadeh; he was also simultaneously teaching in Hawzah and Mashhad University of Ferdosi. Likewise, Hosseini-Khorasani immigrated to Qom, and participated at the classes of Shia scholars amongst: Hasanzadeh Amoli, Javadi-Amoli, etc. So far, there have been published more than 50 scientific articles from this Iranian ayatollah.

== See also ==
- Assembly of Experts
- Expediency Discernment Council
- Guardian Council
- Ahmad Alamolhoda
- Mohammad-Taqi Mesbah-Yazdi
