= 1979 Iranian constitutional referendum =

- 2–3 December 1979
- Do you approve the Constitution of the Islamic Republic of Iran?

Results
Choice	Votes	%
Yes	15,680,329	99.50%
No	78,516	0.50%
Valid votes	15,758,845	100.00%
Invalid or blank votes	111	0.00%
Total votes	15,758,956	100.00%

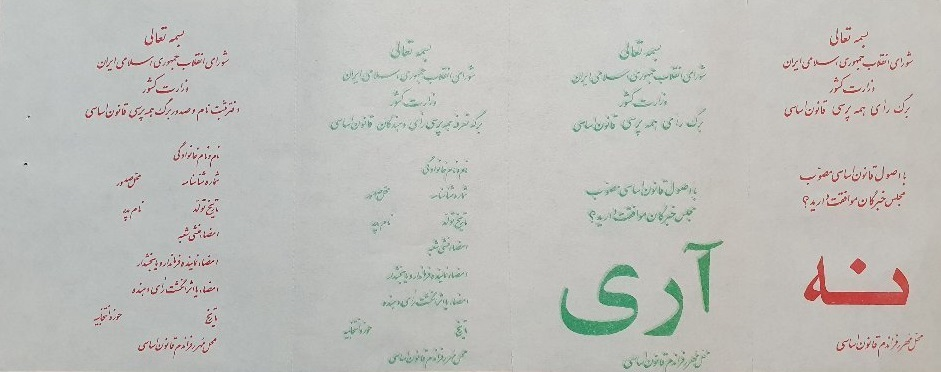
Referendum ballot

A constitutional referendum was held in Iran on 2 and 3 December 1979, in which the new Islamic constitution was approved by 99.5% of voters.

== Background ==
=== Path to an Islamic Republic ===
In 1907, a supplement to Iran's constitution was adopted to reconcile its European-influenced constitutional provisions with Shia doctrine, though it did not establish a distinctly Islamic legal framework. In March 1979 the Pahlavi dynasty was overthrown and an Islamic republic was established following the Iranian Islamic Republic referendum. On 1 April 1979, following the referendum, Imam Khomeini proclaimed the Islamic Republic of Iran, declaring the end of the 2,500-year-old monarchy and calling it the first day of a "Government of God," while emphasizing the need to ratify a new constitution.

=== Drafting the constitution ===
On 12 January 1979, an election for the Assembly of Experts was held, with Ayatollah Khomeini encouraging Iranians to choose their representatives. The Assembly, functioning as a constituent assembly, commenced its activities on 3–4 August 1979 with 72 representatives from across Iran. During these proceedings, Ayatollah Akbar Hashemi Rafsanjani conveyed Khomeini's message that the "Constitution and other laws in this Republic must be based one hundred per cent on Islam." The Assembly continued its deliberations until 15 November 1979, with the new constitution ultimately receiving approval from at least two-thirds of its representatives. In June 1979, Ayatollah Khomeini made minor adjustments to the draft and stipulated that it be subjected to a referendum.

=== Organisation of the referendum ===
The referendum was held by the Council of the Islamic Revolution, as Bazargan's Interim Government—which had overseen the previous referendum—had resigned in protest over the U.S. Embassy hostage crisis. The day before the vote, during the mourning of Ashura, Ayatollah Ruhollah Khomeini declared that those who did not vote would be helping Americans and desecrating Shohada (Martyrs).

== The proposed constitution ==
The new constitution codified Iran's governance according to Shia Islam and included an appendix citing verses of the Quran and religious traditions in support of its articles. Its principal provisions would make Iran an Islamic republic, introduce direct elections for the presidency, create a unicameral parliament, and require any constitutional changes to go to a referendum.

Among the most significant structural changes was a new chapter on leadership replacing the former chapter on monarchy, along with new chapters on foreign policy and mass media. Several articles from the previous constitution were preserved, including equality before the law (Articles 19–20); guarantees of the security of life, property, honour, and domicile (Articles 22, 39); freedom of opinion and choice of profession (Articles 23, 28); rights to due process (Articles 32–36) and to the privacy of communications (Article 25); and provisions governing public deliberations of the Majlis, parliamentary procedure, and the rights and responsibilities of ministers (Articles 69, 70, 74, 88–90).

== Campaign ==
=== Supporters ===
The Islamic Republican Party backed a yes vote, as did the communist Tudeh Party of Iran, which expressed its support for "Imam's line". The Freedom Movement of Iran also urged a yes vote, arguing that the alternative was anarchy.

=== Boycott ===
A broad coalition of opposition groups called for a boycott of the referendum, including leftists, secular nationalists, Islamist followers of Mohammad Kazem Shariatmadari, and the prominent opposition group People's Mojahedin Organization (PMOI). As a result of the boycott, turnout among Sunni minorities in Kurdistan and Sistan and Baluchestan Provinces, as well as in Shariatmadari's home region of Azerbaijan, was low, and the total number of votes fell compared to the March referendum. Historian Ervand Abrahamian estimates that nearly 17% of the population did not support the constitution.

=== Party positions ===
Position	Organizations	Ref
Yes
Yes	Islamic Republican Party	
Yes	Freedom Movement	
Yes	Tudeh Party	
Boycott	National Front	
Boycott	National Democratic Front	
Boycott	Muslim People's Republic Party	
Boycott	People's Mojahedin Organization	
Boycott	People's Fedai (Majority)	
Boycott	People's Fedai (Minority)	
Boycott	People's Fedai Guerrillas	
Boycott	Democratic Party of Iranian Kurdistan	
Boycott	Komala Party of Iranian Kurdistan	

== Results ==
Choice	Votes	%
For	15,680,329	99.50
Against	78,516	0.50
Invalid/blank votes	111	–
Total	15,758,956	100
Registered voters	~22,000,000	
Source: Nohlen et al.
