= List of Iranian legislative elections =

Iranian legislative elections are held every four years to elect members of the Islamic Consultative Assembly.

== Elections after revolution ==
Elections of the Islamic Consultative Assembly
Date	N. Eligible Voters	N. Actual Voters	Voter Turnout	N. Precincts	N. Seats	N. C. Registered	N. C. Qualified	C. Qualified	Ref.
14 March & 9 May 1980	20,758,391	10,875,969	52.14%	193	270	3,694	1,910	51.70%	
15 April & 17 May 1984	24,143,498 ▲	15,607,306 ▲	64.64% ▲	193	270	1,592 ▼	1,231 ▼	77.32% ▲	
8 April & 13 May 1988	27,986,736 ▲	16,714,281 ▲	59.72% ▼	193	270	1,999 ▲	1,417 ▲	70.88% ▼	
10 April & 8 May 1992	32,465,558 ▲	18,767,042 ▲	57.71% ▼	196 ▲	270	3,233 ▲	2,741 ▲	84.78% ▲	
8 March & 19 April 1996	34,716,000 ▲	24,682,386 ▲	71.10% ▲	196	270	8,365 ▲	6,954 ▲	83.18% ▼	
18 February & 5 May 2000	38,726,431 ▲	26,082,157 ▲	67.35% ▼	207 ▲	290 ▲	6,853 ▼	5,742 ▼	83.37% ▲	
20 February & 7 May 2004	46,351,032 ▲	23,734,677 ▼	51.21% ▼	207	290	8,172 ▲	5,450 ▼	66.69% ▼	
14 March & 25 April 2008	43,824,254 ▼	22,350,254 ▼	51% ▼ Disputed (Note: Despite an increase in Iranian population comparing to previous elections, number of eligible voters decreased. This was due to the fact that voting age was raised from 15 to 18. Ministry of Interior declared that eligible voters are some 43 million people, while according to the official results of 2006 general census done by the ministry's subdivision, "Statistical Center of Iran" (Persian: مرکز آمار ایران), the population of people over 18 years old was millions more, particularly 47,579,013. This led to allegations of 'manipulation'.)	207	290	7,597 ▼	4,476 ▼	58.92% ▼	
2 March & 4 May 2012	48,288,799 ▲	26,472,760 ▲	64.2% ▲ Disputed (Note: The official voter turnout was declared 64.2% by the Ministry of Interior. Considering the official statistics published by the ministry, observers and analysts say that the numbers are paradoxical and the turnout would be calculated 54.6% or 54.8%. They also dispute number of eligible voters.)	207	290	5,382 ▼	3,444 ▼	55% ▼	
26 February & 29 April 2016	54,915,024 ▲	34,047,315 ▲	62% ▼	207	290	12,027 ▲	10,443 ▲	88.51% ▲	
21 February and 11 September 2020	57,918,159 ▲	24,512,404 ▼	42.5% ▼	207	290	16,145 ▲			
1 March and 10 May 2024	61,172,298 ▲	24,861,542 ▲	40.64 ▼		290				
