= University of Judicial Sciences and Administrative Services =

University of Judicial Sciences and Administrative Services (UJSAS)
- دانشگاه علوم قضایی; Dāneshgāh-e Olome Ghazayee
- Type: Public
- Established: 1979
- Affiliations: FUIW
- Dean: Dr.farid mohseni (Faculty)
- Administrative staff: 643
- Location: Tehran, Iran
- Campus: Urban
- Website: http://www.ujsas.ac.ir/index.php?slc_lang=en&sid=1

University of Judicial Sciences and Administrative Services (Persian: دانشگاه علوم قضایی و خدمات اداری), also known as University of Judicial Sciences, is an Iranian university established in 1979, pursuant to Article 35 of the Rules of Justice Act.

Most of the judges in Iran are graduates of the University of Judicial Sciences.
