= Guardian Council =

Regulatory body in the Islamic Republic of Iran

Coordinates: 35°41′16.36″N 51°24′4.35″E

Guardian Council شورای نگهبان Shourā-ye Negahbān
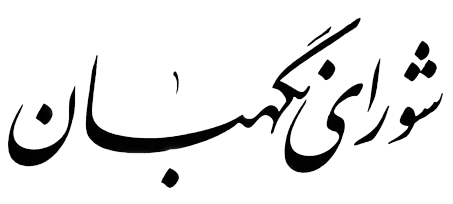

Type
- Type: Election supervision body; Constitutional court; Legislative council (overseeing parliament)

Leadership
- De facto leader: Ahmad Jannati
- Secretary: Ahmad Jannati since 17 July 1992

Structure
- Seats: 12
- Political groups: By faction: Principlists (6); Independents (6); By party: SST (6); IND (6)

Meeting place
- Tehran, Iran

Website
- www.shora-gc.ir

The Guardian Council (also called Council of Guardians or Constitutional Council, Persian: شورای نگهبان, romanized: Shourā-ye Negahbān) is a 12-member council that wields considerable power and influence in the Islamic Republic of Iran.

The Constitution of Iran mandates the Council to:

1. Veto unconstitutional legislation passed by the Islamic Consultative Assembly;
2. Supervise elections;
3. Approve or disqualify candidates seeking to run in local, parliamentary, presidential, or Assembly of Experts elections.

The Council is composed of Islamic clerics and lawyers. Membership is for phased six-year terms: half the membership changes every three years. The supreme leader of Iran directly appoints the six clerics, and may dismiss them at will. The chief justice of Iran nominates six lawyers for confirmation by the Islamic Consultative Assembly.

== Powers ==
The constitution of the Islamic Republic gives the council three mandates:

a) veto power over legislation passed by the Islamic Consultative Assembly;
b) supervision of elections; and
c) approving or disqualifying candidates seeking to run in local, parliamentary, presidential, or Assembly of Experts elections.

The Council has played a central role in controlling the interpretation of Islamic values in Iranian law in the following ways:

- As part of its vetting of potential candidates to determine who can and cannot run for national office, it has disqualified reform-minded candidates—including the most well-known candidates—from running for office;
- Vetoes laws passed by the popularly elected legislature.
- Has increased the influence that the Islamic Revolutionary Guard Corps (an ideological fighting force separate from the Iranian army) has on the economic and cultural life of the country.

There have also been instances where the Constitutional Council reversed its ban on particular people after being ordered to do so by Khamenei.

=== Legislative functions ===
The Islamic Consultative Assembly has no legal status without the Constitutional Council. Any bill passed by the Assembly must be reviewed and approved by the Constitutional Council to become law.

According to Article 96 of the constitution, the Constitutional Council holds absolute veto power over all legislation approved by the Assembly . It can nullify a law based on two accounts: being against Islamic laws, or being against the constitution. While all the members vote on the laws being compatible with the constitution, only the six clerics vote on them being compatible with Islam.

If any law is rejected, it will be passed back to the Majlis for correction. If the Majlis and the Council of Guardians cannot agree on a case, it is passed up to the Expediency Council for a decision.

The Constitutional Council is uniquely involved in the legislative process, with equal oversight with regards to economic law and social policy, including such controversial topics as abortion. Chapter 6 of the Constitution explains its interworkings with the Islamic Consultative Assembly. Articles 91-97 all fall into the legislative Chapter 6.

=== Judicial authority ===
The Council of Guardians also functions similar to a constitutional court. The authority to interpret the constitution is vested in the Council. Interpretative decisions require a three-quarters majority. The Council does not conduct a court hearing where opposing sides are argued.

=== Electoral authority ===
Since 1991, all candidates of parliamentary or presidential elections, as well as candidates for the Assembly of Experts, have to be qualified by the Constitutional Council in order to run in the election. For major elections, it typically disqualifies most candidates, as seen in the 2009 election, where out of the 476 men and women applied to the Constitutional Council to seek the presidency, only four were approved.

The Council is accorded "supervision of elections". The Constitutional Council interprets the term supervision in Article 99 of the Iranian Constitution as "approbation supervision" (Persian: نظارت استصوابی, romanized: nezārat-e estesvābī) which implies the right to accept or reject the legality of elections and the competency of candidates. This interpretation is in contrast with the idea of "notification supervision" (Persian: نظارت استطلاعی, romanized: nezārat-e estetlā‘ī) which does not imply the mentioned approval right. The "evidentiary supervision" (Persian: نظارت استنادی, romanized: nezārat-e estenādī), which requires evidences for acceptance or rejection of elections legality and candidates competency, is another interpretation of mentioned article.

== Composition ==
The Council is composed of Islamic clerics and lawyers. The Iranian constitution calls for the council to be composed of six Islamic faqihs (experts in Islamic Law), "conscious of the present needs and the issues of the day" to be selected by the Supreme Leader of Iran, who may dismiss them at will, and six jurists, "specializing in different areas of law, to be elected by the Majlis from among the Muslim jurists nominated by the Chief Justice" (who, in turn, is also appointed by the Supreme Leader). Membership is for phased six-year terms: half the membership changes every three years.

== Criticism ==
=== Role in the 2009 elections ===
When the 2009 presidential election was announced, popular former president Mohammad Khatami would not discuss his plans to run against Mahmoud Ahmadinejad, for the Council might have disqualified Khatami as it had other reformists' candidatures, on the grounds that they were not dedicated enough to Islamic values.

On 29 June 2009, the Constitutional Council certified the results of the controversial election in which Ahmadinejad was elected. The Council had completed a recount of 10 per cent of the overall votes in order to appease the citizens of Iran. As the "final authority on the election", the Council has declared the election closed. The certification of the results set off a wave of protests, disregarding the Iranian government's ban on street marches.

=== Increases the role of the IRGC in everyday politics ===
The Council favors military candidates at the expense of reform candidates. This ensures that the ideological Islamic Revolutionary Guard Corps (separate from the Iranian army) holds a commanding influence over the political, economic, and cultural life of Iran.

=== Arbitrary disqualifications of candidates from elections ===
Hadi Khamenei, the brother of Supreme Leader Ali Khamenei and an adviser in the administration of reformist former President Mohammad Khatami, has said the Constitutional Council's vetting of candidates threatens Iranian democracy. He believes some reformist candidates are wrongly kept from running. In 1998, the Constitutional Council rejected his candidacy for a seat in the Assembly of Experts for "insufficient theological qualifications".

After conservative candidates fared poorly in the 2000 parliamentary elections, the Council disqualified more than 3,600 reformist and independent candidates for the 2004 elections.

In the run-up to the 2006 Iranian Assembly of Experts election, all female candidates were disqualified.

The Council disqualified many candidates in the 2008 parliamentary elections. One third of them were members of the outgoing parliament it had previously approved. The Iranian Ministry of the Interior reasons for disqualification included narcotics addiction or involvement in drug-smuggling, connections to the Shah's pre-revolutionary government, lack of belief in or insufficient practice of Islam, being "against" the Islamic Republic, or having connections to foreign intelligence services.

=== Rule by unelected leaders ===
This unelected Council frequently vetoes bills passed by the popularly elected legislature. It repeatedly vetoes bills that are in favour of women's rights, electoral reform, the prohibition of torture and ratification of international human rights treaties.

=== Rigging results after elections in favor of conservatives ===
The Guardian Council has been criticized for ousting pro-Reform candidates who had won their elections, without providing legal justification or factual evidence. Examples of such interventions by the Guardian Council are:

- Annulment of the results in Khoy and Eslamabad-e Gharb (2000).
- Rahman Kargosha (2000, Arak), certain ballots were voided in order to declare the conservative incumbent as the winner.
- Alireza Rajaei (2000, Tehran), certain ballots were voided in order to declare the conservative incumbent as the winner.
- Minoo Khaleghi (2016, Isfahan), disqualified after winning the election.
- Khaled Zamzamnejad (2016, Bandar Lengeh), election annulled.
- Beytollah Abdollahi (2016, Ahar and Heris), election annulled.

== Membership ==
=== Current members ===
Principlists/Conservatives

Clerics
| Name | Seat up | Ref |
|---|---|---|
| Ahmad Jannati (Secretary) | 2028 | |
| Mehdi Shabzendedar Jahromi | 2028 | |
| Mohammad-Reza Modarresi Yazdi | 2028 | |
| Ahmad Hosseini Khorasani | 2031 | |
| Alireza Arafi | 2031 | |
| Ahmad Khatami | 2031 | |

Jurists
| Name | Seat up | Ref |
|---|---|---|
| Siamak Rahpeyk (Vice Secretary) | 2028 | |
| Abbas-Ali Kadkhodaei | 2028 | |
| Kheyrollah Parvin | 2028 | |
| Gholamreza Molabeygi | 2031 | |
| Behzad Pourseyyed | 2031 | |
| Hadi Tahan Nazif (Spokesman) | 2031 | |

=== Historic membership ===
| Name | | Period | | | | | | | |
| Name | | 1980–86 | 1986–92 | 1992–98 | 1998–04 | 2004–10 | 2010–16 | 2016–22 | 2022– |
|---|---|---|---|---|---|---|---|---|---|
| Clerics | Ahmad Jannati | Yes | | | | | | | |
| Clerics | Mohammad Momen | —N/a | Yes | | | | | —N/a | |
| Clerics | Mohammad Emami Kashani | —N/a | Yes | | —N/a | | | | |
| Clerics | Gholamreza Rezvani | —N/a | Yes | | | | —N/a | | |
| Clerics | Abolghasem Khazali | —N/a | Yes | | —N/a | | | | |
| Clerics | Mahmoud Hashemi Shahroudi | —N/a | | | | Yes | | —N/a | |
| Clerics | Abdolrahim Rabbani Shirazi | Yes | —N/a | | | | | | |
| Clerics | Lotfollah Safi Golpaygani | Yes | —N/a | | | | | | |
| Clerics | Yousef Sanei | Yes | —N/a | | | | | | |
| Clerics | Mohammad Reza Mahdavi Kani | Yes | —N/a | | | | | | |
| Clerics | Mohammad Mohammadi Gilani | —N/a | Yes | | —N/a | | | | |
| Clerics | Reza Ostadi | —N/a | | | Yes | —N/a | | | |
| Clerics | Mohammad-Hassan Ghadiri | —N/a | | | Yes | —N/a | | | |
| Clerics | Hassan Taheri Khorramabadi | —N/a | | | Yes | —N/a | | | |
| Clerics | Mohammad Yazdi | —N/a | | | Yes | | | —N/a | |
| Clerics | Mohammad Reza Modarresi-Yazdi | —N/a | | | | Yes | | | |
| Clerics | Mohammad Mehdi Rabbani-Amlashi | Yes | —N/a | | | | | | |
| Clerics | Sadegh Larijani | —N/a | | | | Yes | —N/a | Yes (until 2021) | —N/a |
| Clerics | Mehdi Shabzendedar Jahromi | —N/a | | | | | Yes | | |
| Clerics | Alireza Arafi | —N/a | | | | | | Yes | |
| Clerics | Ahmad Khatami | —N/a | | | | | | Yes | |
| Clerics | Ahmad Hosseini Khorasani | —N/a | | | | | | Yes | |
| Jurists | Mohsen Hadavi | Yes | —N/a | | | | | | |
| Jurists | Mehdi Hadavi | Yes | —N/a | | | | | | |
| Jurists | Mohammad Salehi | Yes | | —N/a | | | | | |
| Jurists | Ali Arad | Yes | | —N/a | Yes | —N/a | | | |
| Jurists | Hossein Mehrpour | Yes | | —N/a | | | | | |
| Jurists | Goudarz Eftekhar Jahromi | Yes | —N/a | | | | | | |
| Jurists | Jalal Madani | —N/a | | Yes | —N/a | | | | |
| Jurists | Khosro Bijani | Yes | | | —N/a | | | | |
| Jurists | Hassan Fakheri | —N/a | Yes | | —N/a | | | | |
| Jurists | Mohammad Reza Alizadeh | —N/a | Yes | | | | | —N/a | |
| Jurists | Hassan Habibi | —N/a | Yes | | | —N/a | | | |
| Jurists | Ahmad Alizadeh | —N/a | Yes | | —N/a | | | | |
| Jurists | Mohammad Reza Abbasifard | —N/a | | Yes | | —N/a | | | |
| Jurists | Reza Zavare'i | —N/a | | Yes | | —N/a | | | |
| Jurists | Ebrahim Azizi | —N/a | | | Yes | | —N/a | | |
| Jurists | Abbas-Ali Kadkhodaei | —N/a | | | | Yes | —N/a | Yes | |
| Jurists | Gholamhossein Elham | —N/a | | | | Yes | —N/a | | |
| Jurists | Abbas Ka'bi | —N/a | | | | Yes | —N/a | | |
| Jurists | Mohsen Esmaeili | —N/a | | | | Yes | | —N/a | |
| Jurists | Mohammad Salimi | —N/a | | | | | Yes | —N/a | |
| Jurists | Siamak Rahpeyk | —N/a | | | | | Yes | | |
| Jurists | Hossein-Ali Amiri | —N/a | | | | Yes | | —N/a | |
| Jurists | Sam Savadkouhi | —N/a | | | | | Yes | —N/a | |
| Jurists | Nejatollah Ebrahimian | —N/a | | | | | Yes | —N/a | |
| Jurists | Fazlollah Mousavi | —N/a | | | | | | Yes | —N/a |
| Jurists | Mohammad Dehghan | —N/a | | | | | | Yes (until 2021) | —N/a |
| Jurists | Mohammad-Hassan Sadeghi Moghaddam | —N/a | | | | | | Yes (until 2025) | |
| Jurists | Hadi Tahan Nazif | —N/a | | | | | | Yes | |
| Jurists | Gholamreza Molabeygi | —N/a | | | | | | Yes (from 2021) | Yes |
| Jurists | Kheyrollah Parvin | —N/a | | | | | | | Yes |
| Jurists | Behzad Pourseyyed | —N/a | | | | | | | Yes (from 2025) |
Note: Each period represents a six-year term from July to June and the number of members in a given period may exceed the maximum twelve-members quota because of the random rotations prescribed in the law.

== See also ==
- History of political Islam in Iran
