= Electoral history of Akbar Hashemi Rafsanjani =

Elections featuring President of Iran

This is a summary of the electoral history of Akbar Hashemi Rafsanjani, an Iranian politician who was member of Assembly of Experts from Tehran Province since 1982 and Chairman of the Expediency Discernment Council since 1989, and has been previously Chairman of the Assembly of Experts (2007–2011), President of Iran (1989–1997), and The Speaker and member of Islamic Consultative Assembly (1980–1989) from Tehran and Minister of Interior (1979–1980).

== Parliament elections ==
=== 1980 ===
He was elected to the Parliament representing Tehran with 1,151,514 (54%) votes. He was ranked 15th in the constituency and won a seat in first round.

=== 1984 ===
He was elected to the Parliament representing Tehran with 1,891,264 (81.9%) votes. He received the most votes and won the first seat in the constituency.

=== 1988 ===
He was elected to the Parliament representing Tehran with 1,573,587 (82.3%) votes. He received the most votes and won the first seat in the constituency.

=== 2000 ===
He received 749,884 (25.58%) votes and secured 30th and the last seat of Tehran for the parliament, but withdrawed after the election.

== Speaker of the Parliament elections ==
He was elected as Speaker of the Parliament of Iran in 10 consecutive sessions (3 terms).

Term	Years	Session	Votes	%	Deputy
1st	1980–1984	1st	146 / 196	74.5	Ali-Akbar Parvaresh
1st	1980–1984	2nd	140 / 167	83.8	Mohammad Mousavi Khoeiniha
1st	1980–1984	3rd	167 / 188	88.8	Mohammad Yazdi
1st	1980–1984	4th	165	–	Mohammad Yazdi
2nd	1984–1988	1st	181 / 189	95.7	Mohammad Yazdi
2nd	1984–1988	2nd	200 / 228	87.7	Mohammad Yazdi
2nd	1984–1988	3rd	179 / 224	79.9	Mehdi Karroubi
2nd	1984–1988	4th	183 / 230	79.5	Mohammad Yazdi
3rd	1988–1989	1st	187 / 192	97.4	Mehdi Karroubi
3rd	1988–1989	2nd	230 / 241	95.4	Mehdi Karroubi

== Presidential elections ==
=== 1989 ===
According to Nohen et al, he was the winner, receiving 15,537,394 votes (94.51%). ISSDP reported 15,550,528 votes (94.52%).

=== 1993 ===
According to Nohen et al, he was the winner, receiving 10,449,933 votes (64%). ISSDP reported 10,566,499 (63%).

=== 2005 ===
He was the leader in the first round, receiving 6,211,937 votes (21.13%). In the second round, he dropped to second place with 10,046,701 votes (35.93%).

== Assembly of Experts ==
=== 1982 ===
According to Abbas Abdi, he received ≈2.22 million votes out of ≈3.2 votes (≈69%) in Tehran.

=== 1990 ===
According to Abbas Abdi, he received ≈1.60 million votes out of ≈1.9 votes (≈82%) in Tehran.

=== 1998 ===
According to Abbas Abdi, he received ≈1.68 million votes out of ≈2.8 votes (≈60%) in Tehran.

=== 2006 ===
According to the Iranian Students News Agency (ISNA), he received ≈1.56 million votes.

== Chairman of the Assembly of Experts elections ==
Term	Date	Candidate	Votes	%
4th	25 July 2007	Akbar Hashemi Rafsanjani	41 / 75	54.7
4th	25 July 2007	Ahmad Jannati	34 / 75	45.3
4th	25 July 2007	Mohammad Yazdi	Withdrew	
4th	10 March 2009	Akbar Hashemi Rafsanjani	51 / 79	65.55
4th	10 March 2009	Mohammad Yazdi	26 / 79	32.9
4th	8 March 2011	Mohammad-Reza Mahdavi Kani	83 / 84	98.8
4th	8 March 2011	Akbar Hashemi Rafsanjani	Withdrew	
4th	10 March 2015 (1st Round)	Mohammad Yazdi	35 / 73	47.9
4th	10 March 2015 (1st Round)	Akbar Hashemi Rafsanjani	25 / 73	34.2
4th	10 March 2015 (1st Round)	Mohammad Momen	13 / 73	17.8
4th	10 March 2015 (1st Round)	Mahmoud Hashemi Shahroudi	Withdrew	
4th	10 March 2015 (2nd Round)	Mohammad Yazdi	47 / 73	64.4
4th	10 March 2015 (2nd Round)	Akbar Hashemi Rafsanjani	24 / 73	32.9
