= Hassan Sane'i =

Iranian cleric (1934–2023)

Hojjatol Eslam Hassan Sane'i
- حسن صانعی
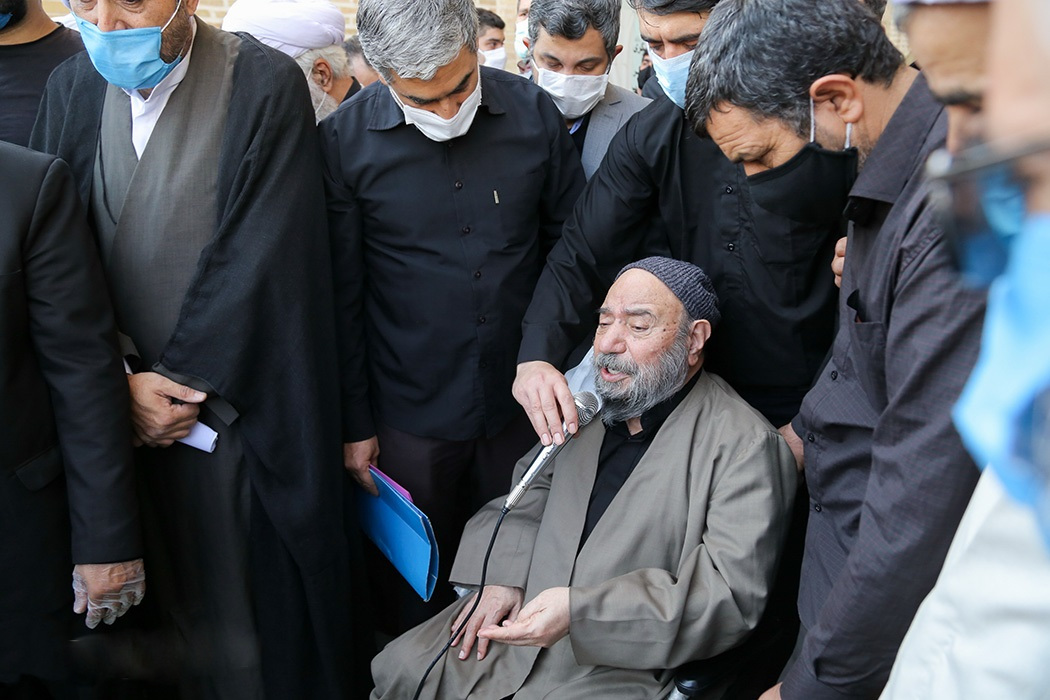
- Saane'i at his brother's funeral in 2020

Member of Expediency Discernment Council
- In office 4 October 1989 – 21 July 2023
- Appointed by: Ali Khamenei
- Chairman: Akbar Hashemi Rafsanjani; Ali Movahedi-Kermani (Acting); Mahmoud Hashemi Shahroudi; Sadeq Larijani

Personal details
- Born: 1934 Nikabad, Iran
- Died: 21 July 2023 (aged 89)

Hassan Sane'i (1934 – 21 July 2023) was an Iranian government official who was a member of the Expediency Discernment Council. He was also the president of the 15 Khordad Foundation, a quasi-governmental foundation that was created in 1981.

Sane'i was a fundamentalist who called for the execution of Salman Rushdie, raising a bounty for his insulting Islam.

Sane'i was the brother of the reformist Grand Ayatollah Yousef Saanei. He died on 21 July 2023, at the age of 89.
