= Ghorbanali Dorri-Najafabadi =

Iranian Ayatollah and politician (born 1950)

- قربانعلی دری نجف‌آبادی
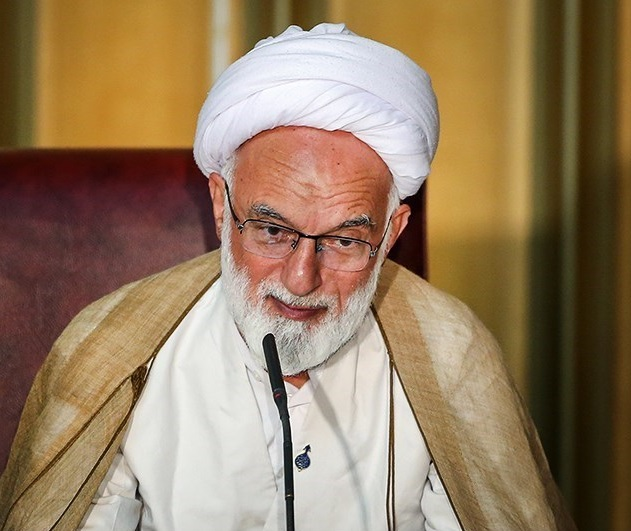
- Dorri-Najafabadi in 2016

Attorney-General of Iran
- In office 23 August 2004 – 24 August 2009
- Appointed by: Mahmoud Hashemi Shahroudi
- Preceded by: Abdolnabi Namazi
- Succeeded by: Gholam-Hossein Mohseni-Eje'i

Minister of Intelligence
- In office 20 August 1997 – 9 February 1999
- President: Mohammad Khatami
- Preceded by: Ali Fallahian
- Succeeded by: Ali Younesi

Member of Expediency Discernment Council
- Incumbent
- Assumed office 17 March 1997
- Appointed by: Ali Khamenei
- Chairman: Akbar Hashemi Rafsanjani; Ali Movahedi-Kermani (Acting); Mahmoud Hashemi Shahroudi; Sadeq Larijani

Member of the Assembly of Experts
- Incumbent
- Assumed office 23 February 1999
- Constituency: Tehran province
- Majority: 2,056,427
- In office 21 February 1991 – 22 February 1999
- Constituency: Ilam province

Member of the Parliament of Iran
- In office 28 May 1992 – 18 August 1997
- Constituency: Tehran, Rey, Shemiranat and Eslamshahr
- In office 28 May 1980 – 28 May 1984
- Constituency: Ardal

Personal details
- Born: Hosseinali Dorri; 1945 (age 80–81) Najafabad, Isfahan province, Iran
- Education: Qom Seminary
- Website: www.dorri.ir

Ghorbanali Dorri-Najafabadi (Persian: قربانعلی دری نجف‌آبادی; born 1945) is an Iranian politician and cleric. He is currently a member of the Assembly of Experts and also a member of the Expediency Discernment Council. He was previously the Minister of Intelligence of Islamic Republic of Iran.

== Career ==
Dorri-Najafabadi was the minister of intelligence in the cabinet of then president Mohammad Khatami. During his term of ministership, some journalists and reformist politicians were murdered by security agents, for which the Iranian government later charged his deputy, Saeed Emami, with orchestrating, claiming he had organized them independently. Dorri-Najafabadi resigned and was succeeded by Ali Younessi. The events were later named the "Chain Murders" by the reformist cabinet of President Mohammad Khatami.

After Mohammad Ismaeil Shooshtari, in 2005, he was the attorney-general of the Islamic Republic of Iran. He was succeeded by Jamal Karimi-Rad in the post.

In 2008, he said that toys such as the Barbie doll are "destructive culturally and social danger."

== Compulsory hijab ==
Dorri-Najafabadi is a fierce advocate of compulsory hijab in Iran. At a Friday prayer sermon, he said, "the Holocaust has been as a pretext to fight hijab."

== See also ==
- Haghani Circle
- List of ayatollahs

Political offices
Preceded by Ali Fallahian	Minister of Intelligence of Iran; 1997–2000	Succeeded by Ali Younesi
