= 1989 Iranian constitutional referendum =

- 28 July 1989
- Do you approve the amendments to the Constitution of the Islamic Republic of Iran?
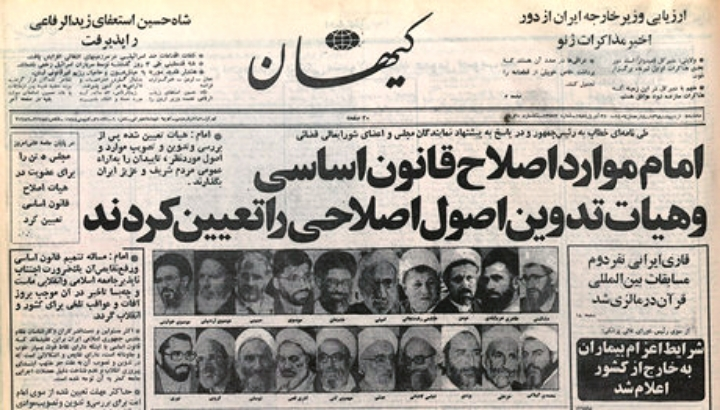
- Kayhan front page headline about the constitutional amendment.

Results
Choice	Votes	%
Yes	16,025,459	97.57%
No	398,867	2.43%
Valid votes	16,424,326	99.80%
Invalid or blank votes	32,445	0.20%
Total votes	16,456,771	100.00%

A constitutional referendum was held in Iran on 28 July 1989, alongside presidential elections. Approved by 97.6% of voters, it was the first and so far only time the Constitution of the Islamic Republic of Iran has been amended. It made several changes to articles 5, 107, 109, 111, and added article 176. It eliminated the need for the Supreme Leader (rahbar) of the country to be a marja or chosen by popular acclaim, it eliminated the post of prime minister, and it created a Supreme National Security Council.

== Background ==
On 24 April 1989 while on his deathbed, Ayatollah Khomeini appointed a 25-man "Council for the Revision of the Constitution" (Persian: شورای بازنگری قانون اساسی, romanized: Šurā-ye bāznegari-e qānun-e asāsi). The council named Ali Khamenei as Khomeini's successor as Supreme Leader of Iran and drew up several amendments to the original constitution. Since the senior mujtahid or Marja of Iran had given only lukewarm support to Khomeini's principle of the Guardianship of the Islamic Jurist, and Khamenei was not a marja, the original prerequisite that the rahbar (leader) be "a paramount faqih" (i.e. one of these marja) was dropped from the constitution.

Some changes to the constitution introduced by the Reform Council include:

- changing the name of the Majlis-e Melli to the Majlis-e Islami.
- increasing the size of the Assembly of Experts to 86 members
- giving the Assembly of Experts the authority to convene at least once a year and to determine whether the Supreme Leader was ‘mentally and physically capable of carrying out his arduous duties.’
- transforming the Expediency Council into a permanent body with members appointed by the Supreme Leader as well as representatives from the three branches of government, the armed forces, the intelligence service, and the Guardian Council.

The amendments were allegedly approved by Iranian voters and became law on 28 July 1989.

== Members of the council ==
This is a list of members of Constitutional Amendment Council of Iran, appointed by Ayatollah Khomeini, who reviewed and amended the Constitution of Iran in 1989:

- Abbas Ali Amid-Zanjani
- Ebrahim Amini
- Ahmad Azari Qomi
- Asadollah Bayat
- Mohammad Emami-Kashani
- Hassan Habibi
- Najafgholi Habibi
- Hossein Hashemian
- Akbar Hashemi Rafsanjani
- Ahmad Jannati
- Mehdi Karroubi
- Ali Khamenei (deputy chairman)
- Hadi Khamenei
- Abolghasem Khazali
- Mohammad Reza Mahdavi-Kani
- Ali Meshkini (chairman)
- Mohammad Mohammadi Gilani
- Mohammad Daneshzadeh Mo'men
- Mir-Hossein Mousavi
- Abdolkarim Mousavi Ardebili
- Mohammad Mousavi-Khoiniha
- Abdollah Noori
- Hassan Taheri-Khorramabadi
- Mohammad Reza Tavassoli
- Mohammad Yazdi

== Results ==
Choice	Votes	%
For	16,025,459	97.6
Against	398,867	2.4
Invalid/blank votes	32,445	–
Total	16,456,771	100
Source: Nohlen et al.
