= Sadegh Vaez-Zadeh =

Iranian professor

- صادق واعظ‌زاده

Member of Expediency Discernment Council
- Incumbent
- Assumed office 14 March 2012
- Appointed by: Ali Khamenei
- Chairman: Akbar Hashemi Rafsanjani; Ali Movahedi-Kermani (Acting); Mahmoud Hashemi Shahroudi; Sadeq Larijani

Vice President of Iran Head of National Elites Foundation
- In office 4 February 2007 – 21 September 2009
- President: Mahmoud Ahmadinejad
- Preceded by: Parviz Davoodi
- Succeeded by: Nasrin Soltankhah

Personal details
- Born: 10 April 1959 (age 67) Mashhad, Iran
- Education: University of Science and Technology (BS); Queen's University (MS & PhD)
- Occupation: Full Professor at Tehran university

Sadegh Vaez-Zadeh (Persian: صادق واعظ‌زاده; born 10 April 1959) is an Iranian politician and professor. He is currently member of the Expediency Discernment Council.

== Academic life ==
He received a B.Sc. degree from the Iran University of Science and Technology, Tehran, Iran, in 1985, and M.Sc. and Ph.D. degrees from Queen's University, Kingston, Ontario, Canada, in 1993 and 1997, respectively, all in electrical engineering. He had been with several research and educational institutions in different positions before joining the University of Tehran as an assistant professor, in 1997, where he became an associate professor, in 2001, and a Full Professor, in 2005. He served the university as the Head of the Power Division from 1998 to 2000 and is currently the Director of the Advanced Motion Systems Research Laboratory, which he founded in 1998. He has also been the Director of the Electrical Engineering Laboratory since 1998. He has coauthored over 200 research articles in these areas and holds a U.S. patent. He is the author of Control of Permanent Magnet Synchronous Motors (Oxford University Press, 2018). His research interests include advanced rotary and linear electric machines and drives, wireless power transfer, renewable energy integration, and energy policy. He is a member of the IEEE PES Motor Sub-Committee and Energy Internet Coordinating Committee. He has received several domestic and international awards for his contributions to the fields. He has been active in IEEE-sponsored conferences as the general chair, a keynote speaker, and as a member of technical and steering committees. He is an Editor of the IEEE Transactions on Energy Conversion, an Editor of the IEEE Transactions on Sustainable Energy, and a Subject Editor of IET Renewable Power Generation.

== Social life ==
He is also a member of Iran's Supreme Council of the Cultural Revolution and Expediency Council. He served as the Vice President for S&T and Head of the National Elites Foundation from 2006 to 2009.

== 2013 presidential elections ==
He was the first candidate to officially register in the 2013 Iranian presidential elections, stating that his campaign was in response to public demand for change. As part of his campaign, he stated he had "designed a comprehensive plan to solve inflation", which had long plagued Iran's economy as a result of years of international sanctions.

== Personal life ==
Vaez-Zadeh is a cousin of Iran's supreme leader Ali Khamenei.
