= Gholamreza Mesbahi-Moghaddam =

Iranian politician (born 1951)

- غلامرضا مصباحی‌مقدم
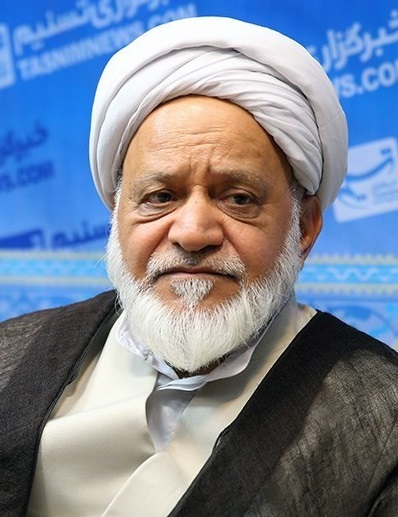
- Mesbahi-Moghaddam in 2018

Member of the Assembly of Experts
- Incumbent
- Assumed office 22 February 2021
- Constituency: Tehran Province
- Majority: 708,774

Member of Expediency Discernment Council
- Incumbent
- Assumed office 14 March 2012
- Appointed by: Ali Khamenei
- Chairman: Akbar Hashemi Rafsanjani; Ali Movahedi-Kermani (Acting); Mahmoud Hashemi Shahroudi; Sadeq Larijani

Member of the Parliament of Iran
- In office 28 May 2004 – 28 May 2016
- Constituency: Tehran, Rey, Shemiranat and Eslamshahr
- Majority: 286,402 (32.68%)

Personal details
- Born: July 11, 1951 (age 75) Mashhad, Iran
- Party: Combatant Clergy Association
- Children: 6
- Education: University of Tehran
- Website: Official website

Gholamreza Mesbahi-Moghaddam (Persian: غلامرضا مصباحی مقدم; born 11 July 1951) is an Iranian conservative politician and the former representative of Tehran in the Iranian parliament. He is currently a member of the Expediency Discernment Council and also a member of Assembly of Experts.

== Biography ==
Gholamreza Mesbahi Moghadam was born in 1951 in Mashhad, Iran, to a religious family. He had a seminary education and was a student of Fazel Lankarani and Jafar Sobhani to learn advanced levels of jurisprudence and principles. He learned philosophy from Ansari Shirazi, and completed a course of jurisprudence and principles in Vahid Khorasani's classes and achieved ijtihad. In addition to his seminary education, Mesbahi Moghadam also has a university education. He has a master's degree in economics and a doctorate in jurisprudence.

== Executive Records ==
- Member of the Council of Representatives of the Supreme Leader in Universities (by order of the Supreme Leader)
- Member of the Supreme Council for Education and Training for three 4-year terms (elected by the Supreme Council of the Seminary and the Guardian Council as a Mujtahid familiar with education and training)
- Vice President for Research at Imam M. Sadeq University (AS)
- Dean of the Faculty of Theology, University of Tehran
- Member of the Board of Trustees of the Research Institute of Islamic Sciences and Cultural Studies
- Head of the Supreme Leader's Representative Institution at the Islamic Azad University
- Director of the Economics Department of the Seminary-University Cooperation Office
- Dean of the Faculty of Theology, Imam M. Sadeq University (AS)
- Director of the Economics Department and Member of the Council for Reviewing Humanities Texts at Universities
- Representative of the People of Tehran in the Islamic Consultative Assembly (7th Term)
- Member of the Economic Commission of the Islamic Consultative Assembly
- Member of the Supreme Council for Money and Credit
- Member of the Bureau for Combating Economic Corruption
- Member of the Special Commission on Article 44 of the Constitution

== Political Records ==
- Member and Spokesperson of the Society of Combatant Clergy
- Member of the Council of Center of the Majlis Majority Faction

== Authors ==
He has also published numerous books and articles, including:

- Jurisprudence of Islamic State Financial Resources
- Discourses on the Epistemological and Cognitive Areas of Islamic Economics
- Baitul Mal in Islamic Economics and Finance
- Collection of Economic Articles
