= Ali Agha-Mohammadi =

Deputy Vice President for Economic Affairs for the Islamic Republic of Iran

Alimohammad Agha-mohammadi
- علی آقامحمدی
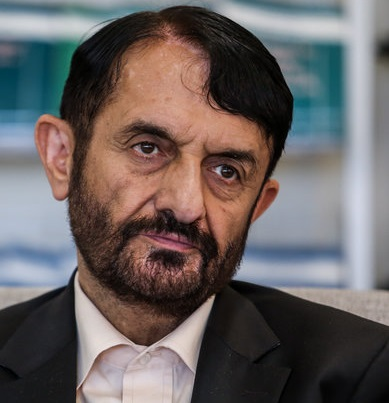
- Agha-Mohammadi in 2019

Member of Expediency Discernment Council
- Incumbent
- Assumed office 27 February 2007
- Appointed by: Ali Khamenei
- Chairman: Akbar Hashemi Rafsanjani; Ali Movahedi-Kermani (Acting); Mahmoud Hashemi Shahroudi; Sadeq Larijani

Member of the Parliament of Iran
- In office 1980–1992
- Constituency: Hamadan

Personal details
- Born: c. 1951 (age 74–75) Hamadan, Iran

Alimohammad Agha-mohammadi is the former deputy vice president for economic affairs of the Islamic Republic of Iran. He is currently member of the Expediency Discernment Council.

He was noted for his 2011 statement that the Iranian government is working on a "halal" (Islamically permitted) version of the Internet. “Iran will soon create an internet that conforms to Islamic principles, to improve its communication and trade links with the world." Some raised doubts about the feasibility of such a network.

== See also ==
- Internet censorship in Iran
