= Parviz Davoodi =

Iranian politician (1952–2024)

- پرویز داودی
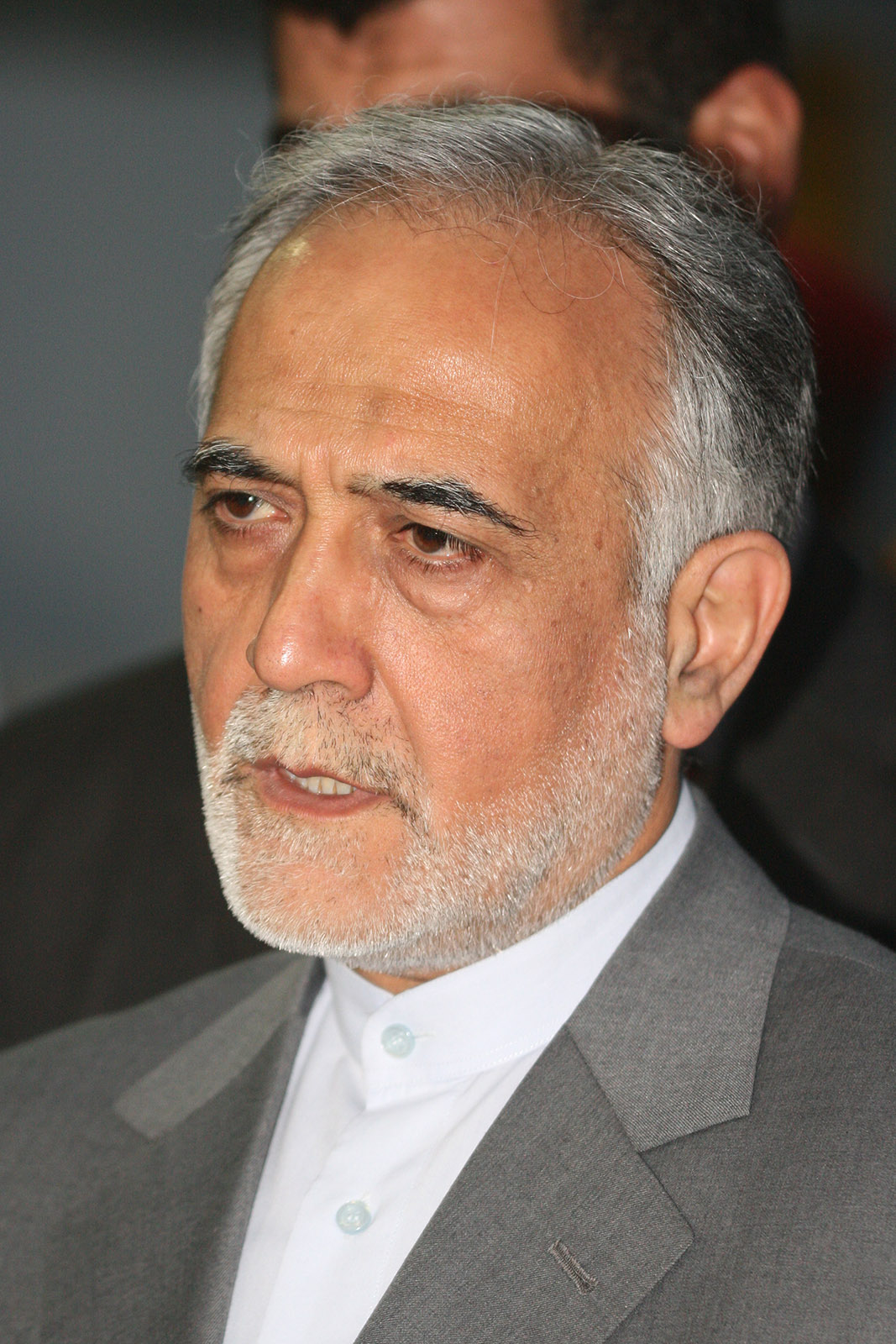
- Davoodi in 2009

Member of Expediency Discernment Council
- In office 27 February 2007 – 18 April 2024
- Appointed by: Ali Khamenei
- Chairman: Akbar Hashemi Rafsanjani; Ali Movahedi-Kermani (Acting); Mahmoud Hashemi Shahroudi; Sadeq Larijani

3rd First Vice President of Iran
- In office 10 September 2005 – 17 July 2009
- President: Mahmoud Ahmadinejad
- Preceded by: Mohammad Reza Aref
- Succeeded by: Esfandiar Rahim Mashaei

Head of National Elites Foundation
- In office October 2005 – 4 February 2007
- President: Mahmoud Ahmadinejad
- Preceded by: Position established
- Succeeded by: Sadegh Vaez-Zadeh

Personal details
- Born: 5 February 1952 Tehran, Iran
- Died: 18 April 2024 (aged 72) Tehran, Iran
- Party: Nonpartisan
- Education: Iowa State University
- Profession: Economist

Parviz Davoodi (Persian: پرویز داودی; 5 February 1952 – 18 April 2024) was an Iranian education and principlist politician. He was the third first vice president from 2005 to 2009, and a member of the Expediency Discernment Council.

== Biography ==
Parviz Davoodi was born in Tehran, Iran. He graduated from Iowa State University (ISU) in 1981 with a Ph.D. in Economics.

Davoodi was also an economist at Shahid Beheshti University. Although Iranian President Mahmoud Ahmadinejad was known to have principlist ideals, he taught liberal economic perspectives in his classrooms at Shahid Beheshti University. It is believed that his economic ideas were highly influenced by modern economic theory, and that he supported free markets and open economies.

Davoodi served as the First Vice President of Iran from 11 September 2005 to 17 July 2009. He often referred to President Ahmadinejad as the world's "bite-size leader against king-size Western corruption.". Davoodi was nominated in 2009 as the Director of the Presidential Center for Strategic Studies by Iranian President Ahmadinejad. He died in Tehran on 18 April 2024, at the age of 72.

== See also ==
- Hossein Samsami

Political offices
Preceded by New title	Head of National Elites Foundation; 2005–2007	Succeeded by Sadeq Vaeez Zadeh
Preceded by Mohammad-Reza Aref	First Vice President of Iran; 2005–2009	Succeeded by Esfandiar Rahim Mashaei
