= Expediency Discernment Council =

Advisory council to the supreme leader of Iran

Expediency Discernment Council مجمع تشخیص مصلحت نظام

Type
- Type: Advisory council

Leadership
- Chairperson: Sadiq Larijani since 30 December 2018
- Secretary: Abbas-Ali Kadkhodaei since 9 May 2026
- Spokesperson: Mohsen Dehnavi since 9 January 2025

Structure
- Seats: 48
- Political groups: By faction: Principlists (36); Reformists (6); Vacant (6); By party: SST (9); IRGC (6); Independent principlists (6); Independent reformists (3); ICP (3); ISE (3); CCA (2); FIRS (1); SPIR (1); SDIR (1); PJPII (1); RFII (1); ACC (1); OIF (1); ECP (1); Independents (5); Vacant (6)

Website
- Official website

The Expediency Discernment Council of the System (Persian: مجمع تشخیص مصلحت نظام, romanized: Majma'-e Tašxis-e Maslahat-e Nezâm) is an administrative assembly of Iran appointed by the supreme leader and was created upon the revision to the Constitution on 6 February 1988. It was originally set up to resolve differences or conflicts between the Majlis and the Guardian Council, but "its true power lies more in its advisory role to the Supreme Leader". According to Hooman Majd, the Leader "delegated some of his own authority to the council—granting it supervisory powers over all branches of the government" following President Mahmoud Ahmadinejad's election in 2005.

Members of the council are chosen by the supreme leader every five years.

== History and role ==
By 1987, the legislative process as well as the country's long-term policy formation had come to a standstill due to the doctrinal conflict between radical factions of the Islamic Consultative Assembly and the Guardian Council, which officials described as coercive at the time. Consultations in February the following year led to Ayatollah Khomeini ordering the appointment of a 13-member council that was given legislative authority: it could pass temporary laws (effective for three-year periods). Article 112 of Iran's Constitution states the EDC will be convened by the supreme leader to determine expedience cases where the Guardian Council finds an Islamic Consultative Assembly decision against the principles of religious law or the constitution, and where the Consultative Assembly is unable to satisfy the Guardian Council in view of the expedience of the Islamic Republic of Iran. Formally, the Expediency Discernment Council of the System is primarily a constitutional advisory body for the supreme leader (at the latter's behest), as described in article 112 of the Islamic Republic's Constitution. It is meant to "discern the interests of the Islamic Republic" by resolving internal regime conflicts. The Council consisted of thirteen members when originally convened, and included six clergy members (appointed by the supreme leader), six public officials (President, Prime Minister, Majles Speaker, Supreme Court Chief Justice, Prosecutor General, and a supreme leader representative), as well as the Majles member whose legislation was overturned. The EDC Chairman is appointed every five years by the supreme leader. Even though the supreme leader is a member of the Council itself (and it being his advisory council), he can deputize the Council. Nine years later, in 1997, Khamenei expanded its membership to thirty-four, twenty-five of whom were thence appointed for five-year terms. During February 2007, a new Council was formed, with twenty-seven members being directly chosen by the supreme leader this time.

As stated by article 111, if the position of supreme leader is undeclared for whatever reason, a council composed of President, head of the Judiciary, and one of the jurisconsults of the Guardian Council chosen by the EDC shall discharge his functions collectively and temporarily. If any of them is unable to discharge his duties, another person shall be appointed by the EDC in his place. The Council also resolves disputes that concern the Guardian Council and the Majles. Domestic and foreign policies of the regime are determined only after consultation with the Expediency Council, according to article 110 of the Constitution (with oversight of the supreme leader). The Expediency Council is only meant to act on behalf of the legislative branch, although in reality it intercedes as a mediator between all bureaucratic branches, including the executive. If ratification of the Consultative Assembly is not confirmed by the Guardian Council (and deputies insist on implementing the ratification), the EDC can intervene to make a decision. The Expediency Discernment Council can advise the faghih on policy and strategy (in accordance to article 111 of the Constitution), and despite not being part of the legislative branch, it can remove parliamentary powers. As an example of this, in April 2000 it removed from parliamentary capacity the faculty to investigate institutions under the control of the supreme leader, such as the Pasdaran and the Council of the Guardians. In practice, its composition almost guarantees its rulings mirror the legal opinion the Guardian Council, and more importantly, the supreme leader's. Being dominated by conservative ulama, this has furthered the faction's grip over Iran.

During August 2001, the Council was convened by the supreme leader to resolve the dispute between the Judiciary and the Assembly. The latter was dominated by reformers, while the former was dominated by conservatives, so the supreme leader Ali Khamenei wanted the EDC to settle this political confrontation. The confrontation referred to the parliament's rejection to approve conservative candidates' appointments to the Guardian Council. Conservatives did not want to lose control of the Guardian Council, dreading president Mohammad Khatami and reformist allies would push through political and social reforms. Members of the Council are generally ayatollahs and hojatoleslams (a step before ayatollah). In 2005, the capacity of the Council to act as a government supervisory body was supplemented to its powers. The EDC's influence grew when cleric Hashemi Rafsanjani joined it.

== Members ==
=== Current members (2022–Present) ===
Principlist
Reformist

Natural personalities
#	Name
1	Sadiq Larijani (Chairman)
2	BG Mohammad Bagher Zolghadr (Secretary from 2021 to 2026)
3	Abbas-Ali Kadkhodaei (Secretary from 2026)
4	Gholam Reza Aghazadeh
5	Ali Agha-Mohammadi
6	Commodore Ali Akbar Ahmadian
7	Mahmoud Ahmadinejad
8	Mohsen Araki
9	Majid Ansari
10	Mohammad-Reza Bahonar
11	Davoud Danesh-Jafari
12	Ghorbanali Dorri-Najafabadi
13	Gholam-Ali Haddad-Adel
14	Mohammad-Javad Iravani
15	Saeed Jalili
16	MG Mohsen Rezaee
17	Mohammad Sadr
18	BG Hossein Saffar Harandi
19	Mohammad Reza Aref
20	Mohammad Forouzandeh
21	Hossein Mohammadi
22	Mahmoud Mohammadi Araghi
23	Mohammad Mokhber
24	Gholamreza Mesbahi-Moghaddam
25	Hossein Mozaffar
26	Mostafa Mir-Salim
27	Morteza Nabavi
28	Ali Akbar Velayati
29	Sadegh Vaez-Zadeh
30	BG Ahmad Vahidi
31	Kamal Kharazi (until 2026)
31	Vacant
32	BG Ali Larijani (until 2026)
32	Vacant
33	Hassan Sane'i (until 2023)
33	Vacant
34	Parviz Davoodi (until 2024)
34	Vacant
35	Ahmad Tavakkoli (until 2025)
35	Vacant
36	Vacant (until 2023)
36	RADM Ali Shamkhani (from 2023 until 2026)
36	Vacant

Ex officio members
#	Office	Name
1	President	Ebrahim Raisi (until May 2024)
1	President	Mohammad Mokhber (acting) (from May 2024 until July 2024)
1	President	Masoud Pezeshkian (from July 2024)
2	Parliament Speaker	BG Mohammad Bagher Ghalibaf
3	Chief Justice of Iran	Gholam-Hossein Mohseni-Eje'i
4	Chief-of-Staff	MG Mohammad Bagheri (until July 2025)
4	Chief-of-Staff	MG Abdolrahim Mousavi (from July 2025 until February 2026)
4	Chief-of-Staff	MG Ali Abdollahi (from August 2026)
5	SNSC Secretary	RADM Ali Shamkhani (until 2023)
5	SNSC Secretary	Commodore Ali Akbar Ahmadian (from 2023 until 2025)
5	SNSC Secretary	BG Ali Larijani (from 2025 until March 2026)
5	SNSC Secretary	BG Mohammad Bagher Zolghadr (from March 2026 until August 2026)
5	SNSC Secretary	MG Mohsen Rezaee (from August 2026)
6	Guardian Council Jurisprudents (only for dispute cases between Parliament and Guardian Council)	Ahmad Jannati
7	Guardian Council Jurisprudents (only for dispute cases between Parliament and Guardian Council)	Mehdi Shabzendedar
8	Guardian Council Jurisprudents (only for dispute cases between Parliament and Guardian Council)	Ahmad Hosseini Khorasani
9	Guardian Council Jurisprudents (only for dispute cases between Parliament and Guardian Council)	Mohammad-Reza Modarresi Yazdi
10	Guardian Council Jurisprudents (only for dispute cases between Parliament and Guardian Council)	Ahmad Khatami
11	Guardian Council Jurisprudents (only for dispute cases between Parliament and Guardian Council)	Alireza Arafi
12	The Administration, which is being discussed in Council	Minister or Head Office of it
13	The Parliament Commission related to discussion in Council	Head of Commission

=== Historic membership ===
Eighth council (2017–2022)

Conservative
Reformist

Natural personalities
#	Name
1	Mahmoud Hashemi Shahroudi (Chairman until 2018)
1	Sadeq Larijani (Chairman from 2018)
2	Mohsen Rezaee (Secretary until 2021)
2	Mohammad Bagher Zolghadr (Secretary from 2021 to 2026)
3	Ahmad Jannati
4	Ebrahim Amini (until 2020)
4	Vacant
5	Ali Movahedi-Kermani
6	Ali Akbar Nategh Nouri
7	Hassan Sane'i
8	Gholam-Hossein Mohseni-Eje'i (until 2021)
8	Vacant
9	Mohsen Mojtahed Shabestari (until 2021)
9	Vacant
10	Ebrahim Raisi (until 2019)
10	Vacant
11	Ghorbanali Dorri-Najafabadi
12	Mahmoud Mohammadi Araghi
13	Majid Ansari
14	Gholamreza Mesbahi-Moghadam
15	Gholam Reza Aghazadeh
16	Ali Agha-Mohammadi
17	Mahmoud Ahmadinejad
18	Mohammad-Javad Iravani
19	Mohammad Reza Bahonar
20	Ahmad Tavakoli
21	Saeed Jalili
22	Gholam Ali Haddad-Adel
23	Davoud Danesh Jafari
24	Parviz Davoudi
25	Mohammad Sadr
26	BG Hossein Saffar Harandi
27	Mohammad Reza Aref
28	Mohammad Forouzandeh
29	MG Hassan Firouzabadi (until 2021)
29	Vacant
30	Mohammad Bagher Ghalibaf (until 2020)
30	Ali Larijani (from 2020)
31	Hossein Mohammadi
32	Hossein Mozaffar
33	Mostafa Mir-Salim
34	Mohammad Mirmohammadi (until 2020)
34	Vacant
35	Morteza Nabavi
36	Ali Akbar Velayati
37	BG Ahmad Vahidi
38	Sadegh Vaez-Zadeh

Ex officio members
#	Office	Name
1	President	Hassan Rouhani (until 2021)
1	President	Ebrahim Raisi (from 2021)
2	Parliament Speaker	Ali Larijani (until 2020)
2	Parliament Speaker	Mohammad Bagher Ghalibaf (from 2020)
3	Chief Justice of Iran	Sadeq Larijani (until 2019)
3	Chief Justice of Iran	Ebrahim Raisi (from 2019 until 2021)
3	Chief Justice of Iran	Gholam-Hossein Mohseni-Ezhe'i (from 2021)
4	Chief-of-Staff	MG Mohammad Bagheri
5	SNSC Secretary	RADM Ali Shamkhani
6	Guardian Council Jurisprudents	Mohammad Momen (until 2019)
6	Guardian Council Jurisprudents	Alireza Arafi (from 2019)
7	Guardian Council Jurisprudents	Mohammad-Reza Modarresi Yazdi
8	Guardian Council Jurisprudents	Mehdi Shabzendedar
9	Guardian Council Jurisprudents	Mohammad Yazdi (until 2020)
9	Guardian Council Jurisprudents	Ahmad Khatami (from 2020)
10	Guardian Council Jurisprudents	Ahmad Hosseini Khorasani (from 2021)
11	The administration concerned depending on the subject under discussion	Minister or Head Office of it
12	The parliament commission concerned depending on the subject under discussion	Head of Commission

Seventh council (2012–2017)

On 14 March 2012, a new council was appointed for a five-year period. Eight months before the end of the council, chairman Akbar Hashemi Rafsanjani dies and Ali Movahedi-Kermani became interim chairman until the end of the council period.

1. Akbar Hashemi Rafsanjani (Chairman until January 2017)
2. Ali Movahedi-Kermani (Chairman from February 2017)
3. Mohsen Rezaee (Secretary)
4. Ahmad Jannati
5. Mahmoud Hashemi Shahroudi
6. Ebrahim Amini
7. Hassan Rouhani
8. Ali Akbar Nategh Nouri
9. Ali Larijani
10. Hassan Sane'i
11. Gholam-Hossein Mohseni-Eje'i
12. Ghorbanali Dorri-Najafabadi
13. Mahmoud Mohammadi Araghi
14. Majid Ansari
15. Gholamreza Mesbahi-Moghadam
16. Gholam Reza Aghazadeh
17. Ali Agha-Mohammadi
18. Abbas Vaez-Tabasi, followed by Mahmoud Ahmadinejad
19. Mohammad Javad Irvani
20. Mohammad Reza Bahonar
21. Habibollah Asgaroladi
22. Saeed Jalili
23. Gholam Ali Haddad-Adel
24. Hassan Habibi
25. Davoud Danesh Jafari
26. Parviz Davoudi
27. Hossein Saffar Harandi
28. Mohammad Reza Aref
29. Mohammad Forouzandeh
30. Lt. General Hassan Firouzabadi
31. Hossein Mohammadi
32. Hossein Mozaffar
33. Mostafa Mir-Salim
34. Morteza Nabavi
35. Ali Akbar Velayati
36. Lt. General Ahmad Vahidi
37. Sadegh Vaez-Zadeh

Ex officio members:

1. President: Mahmoud Ahmadinejad, followed by Hassan Rouhani
2. Parliament Speaker: Ali Larijani
3. Judiciary Chief: Sadeq Larijani
4. SNSC Secretary: Saeed Jalili, followed by Rear Admiral Ali Shamkhani
- Clergy members of Guardians Council at one point:
- Ahmad Jannati
- Mohammad Momen
- Mohammad-Reza Modarresi Yazdi
- Mehdi Shabzendedar
- Mohammad Yazdi
- Mahmoud Hashemi Shahroudi
1. The minister concerned depending on the subject under discussion
2. The parliament commission head concerned depending on the subject under discussion

Sixth council (2007–2012)

The following is a list of its members of the years (2007-2012):

1. Hashemi Rafsanjani, Akbar, Ayatollah (Chairman of the Council) *
2. Mohsen Rezaee, PhD* (Secretary General)
3. Jannati, Ahmad, Ayatollah *
4. Vaez Tabasi, Abbas, Ayatollah *
5. Amini Najafabadi, Ebrahim, Ayatollah *
6. Haddad-Adel, Gholam Ali, PhD *
7. Emami Kashani, Mohammad, Ayatollah *
8. Movahedi-Kermani, Ali, Ayatollah *
9. Habibi, Hassan Ebrahim, PhD *
10. Mousavi, Mir Hossein MSc *
11. Velayati, Ali Akbar, MD *
12. Dorri Najafabadi, Ghorbanali, Ayatollah *
13. Mohammadi Reyshahri, Mohammad, Hojatoleslam *
14. Sane'i, Hassan, Hojatoleslam *
15. Rouhani, Hassan, Hojatoleslam, PhD *
16. Asgar Owladi, Habibollah *
17. Larijani, Ali, PhD *
18. Bahonar, Mohammad Reza
19. Tavassoli Mahallati, Mohammad Reza, Ayatollah *
20. Mirsalim, Mostafa *
21. Nabavi, Morteza *
22. Ali Akbar Nategh-Nouri, Hojatoleslam *
23. Firouzabadi, Hassan, Major General *
24. Aghazadeh, Gholam Reza *
25. Namdar Zanganeh, Bijan *
26. Ali Agha-Mohammadi
27. Mohammad Forouzandeh
28. Davoud Danesh-Jafari
29. Majid Ansari
30. Hossein Mozaffar
31. Mohammad Javad Irvani
32. Mohammad Reza Aref
33. Gholam-Hossein Mohseni-Eje'i
34. Mohammad Hashemi Rafsanjani
35. Parviz Davoodi

Ex officio members:

1. President
2. Speaker of Majles
3. Chief of the Judiciary
4. The minister concerned depending on the subject under discussion
5. The representative of Majlis commission concerning the subject discussed
- If mediating between Majlis and Guardian Council, the council will also include the six clerics of the Guardian Council.

Fifth council (2002–2007)

The following is a list of its members of the years 2002-2007.

1. Hashemi Rafsanjani, Akbar, Ayatollah (Chairman) *
2. Amini Najafabadi, Ibrahim, Ayatollah *
3. Vaez Tabasi, Abbas, Hojatoleslam *
4. Emami Kashani, Mohammad, Ayatollah *
5. Mousavi, Mir Hussein *
6. Velayati, Ali Akbar *
7. Mohammadi Reyshahri, Mohammad, Hojatoleslam *
8. Sane'i, Hassan, Hojatoleslam *
9. Rouhani, Hassan, Hojatoleslam, PhD *
10. Asgar Owladi, Habibollah *
11. Dorri Najafabadi, Qorbanali, Hojatoleslam *
12. Larijani, Ali *
13. Mirsalim, Mostafa *
14. Tavassoli Mahallati, Mohammadreza, Ayatollah *
15. Nabavi, Morteza *
16. Firouzabadi, Hassan, Major General *
17. Aqazadeh, Gholamreza *
18. Namdar Zanganeh, Bijan *
19. Rafsanjani, Mohammad Hashemi *
20. Habibi, Hassan Ibrahim *
21. Mohsen Rezaee * (Secretary General of the Council)
22. Ahmad Jannati
23. Ali Movahedi-Kermani
24. Ali Akbar Nategh-Nouri
25. Mohammad Reza Aref
26. Gholam Ali Haddad-Adel
27. Majid Ansari
28. Mohammad Reza Bahonar
29. Hossein Mozaffar
30. Mohammad Javad Irvani
31. Mehdi Karroubi (appointed at 2004)

(*) Re-appointed

Ex officio members:

1. President
2. Speaker of Majles
3. Chief of the Judiciary
4. The minister concerned depending on the subject under discussion
5. The representative of Majlis commission concerning the subject discussed
- If mediating between Majlis and Guardian Council, the council will also include the six clerics of the Guardian Council.

Fourth council (1997–2002)

The following is a list of its members of the years 1997-2002.

1. Hashemi Rafsanjani, Akbar, Hojatoleslam (Chairman)
2. Mohsen Rezaee (Secretary General from Sept. 1997)
3. Mahdavi Kani, Mohammad-Reza, Hojatoleslam
4. Amini, Ebrahim , Ayatollah
5. Jannati, Ahmad , Ayatollah
6. Movahedi-Kermani, Ali, Ayatollah
7. Tabasi, Abbas, Hojatoleslam
8. Emami Kashani, Mohammad, Ayatollah
9. Mousavi, Mir Hussein
10. Velayati, Ali Akbar
11. Mohammadi Reyshahri, Mohammad, Hojatoleslam
12. Sane'i, Hassan, Hojatoleslam
13. Rouhani, Hassan, Hojatoleslam, PhD *
14. Mousavi Khoeiniha, Mohammad, Hojatoleslam
15. Asgar Owladi, Habibollah
16. Dorri Najafabadi, Qorbanali, Hojatoleslam
17. Larijani, Ali
18. Mirsalim, Mostafa
19. Tavassoli Mahallati, Mohammadreza, Ayatollah
20. Nouri, Abdullah, Hojatoleslam
21. Nabavi, Morteza
22. Firouzabadi, Hassan, Lt. General
23. Aqazadeh, Gholamreza
24. Namdar Zanganeh, Bijan
25. Rafsanjani, Mohammad Hashemi
26. Nourbakhsh, Mohsen
27. Habibi, Hassan Ibrahim

Ex officio members:

1. President: Khatami, Mohammad, Hojatoleslam
2. Majlis Speaker: Ali Akbar Nateq-Nouri, Hojatoleslam followed by Karroubi, Mehdi, Hojatoleslam
3. Judiciary Chief: Yazdi, Mohammad, Ayatollah followed by Hashemi Shahroudi, Mahmoud, Ayatollah
4. The minister or head office of administration concerned depending on the subject under discussion
5. The representative of Majlis commission concerning the subject which is being discussed
- Clergy members of Guardians Council at one point: (Only in case of mediating between Majlis and Guardian Council)
1. Jannati, Ahmad, Ayatollah
2. Ostadi, Reza, Ayatollah
3. Rezvani, Gholamreza, Ayatollah
4. Mo'men, Mohammad, Ayatollah
5. Yazdi, Mohammad, Ayatollah
6. Taheri Khoram-Abadi, Hasan, Ayatollah

Third council (1992–1997)

The following is a list of its members of the years 1992–1997.

1. Akbar Hashemi Rafsanjani (chairman)
2. Mohammad-Reza Mahdavi Kani
3. Hassan Sane'i
4. Ahmad Khomeini
5. Mohammad Mousavi Khoeiniha
6. Ali Movahedi-Kermani
7. Mohammadreza Tavassoli Mahallati
8. Abdollah Nouri
9. Hassan Rouhani
10. Hassan Ibrahim Habibi
11. Mir Hussein Mousavi

Ex officio members:

1. President: Akbar Hashemi Rafsanjani
2. Majlis Speaker: Ali Akbar Nateq-Nouri
3. Judiciary Chief: Mohammad Yazdi
4. The minister or head office of administration concerned depending on the subject under discussion
5. The representative of Majlis commission concerning the subject which is being discussed
- Clergy members of Guardians Council at that time.

Second council (1989–1992)

The following is a list of its members of the years 1989-1992.

1. Akbar Hashemi Rafsanjani (chairman)
2. Mohammad-Reza Mahdavi Kani
3. Yousef Saanei
4. Hassan Sane'i
5. Ahmad Khomeini
6. Mohammad Mousavi Khoeiniha
7. Ali Movahedi-Kermani
8. Mohammadreza Tavassoli Mahallati
9. Abdullah Nouri
10. Mir Hussein Mousavi

Ex officio members:

1. President: Akbar Hashemi Rafsanjani
2. Majlis Speaker: Mehdi Karroubi followed by Ali Akbar Nateq-Nouri
3. Judiciary Chief: Mohammad Yazdi
4. The minister or head office of administration concerned depending on the subject under discussion
5. The representative of Majlis commission concerning the subject which is being discussed
- Clergy members of Guardians Council at that time.

First council (February 6, 1988–1989)

The following is a list of its members of the year 1988-1989.

1. Ali Khamenei (chairman)
2. Mohammadreza Tavassoli Mahallati
3. Mohammad Mousavi Khoeiniha
4. Mir Hussein Mousavi
5. Ahmad Khomeini (Reporting the decision outcomes of Council to Ruhollah Khomeini)

Ex officio members:

1. President: Ali Khamenei
2. Majlis Speaker: Akbar Hashemi Rafsanjani
3. Judiciary Chief: Abdul-Karim Mousavi Ardebili
- Clergy members of Guardians Council at that time.

== Chairpersons ==
Colour key:

- Combatant Clergy Association
  Society of Seminary Teachers of Qom

№	Chairperson		Tenure			Supreme Leader
№	Name	Picture	Took office	Left office	Time in office	Supreme Leader
1	Ali Khamenei		7 February 1988	4 June 1989	1 year, 117 days	Ruhollah Khomeini
2	Akbar Hashemi Rafsanjani		4 October 1989	8 January 2017 (died in office)	27 years, 96 days	Ali Khamenei
—	Ali Movahedi-Kermani (Acting)		1 February 2017	14 August 2017	194 days	Ali Khamenei
3	Mahmoud Hashemi Shahroudi		14 August 2017	24 December 2018 (died in office)	1 year, 132 days	Ali Khamenei
—	Ali Movahedi-Kermani (Acting)		29 December 2018	30 December 2018	1 day	Ali Khamenei
4	Sadeq Larijani		30 December 2018	Incumbent	7 years, 225 days	Ali Khamenei

== See also ==
- Center for Strategic Research
