= Jahromi =

Jahromi (Persian: جهرمی) is an Iranian surname.

Notable people with this surname include:

- Mehdi Shabzendedar Jahromi, Iranian Shia jurist
- Mohammad Jahromi, Iranian politician
- Mohammad-Javad Azari Jahromi, Iranian engineer
- Sajad Zareian Jahromi, Iranian squash player
