= Morteza Nabavi =

Iranian politician

- مرتضی نبوی
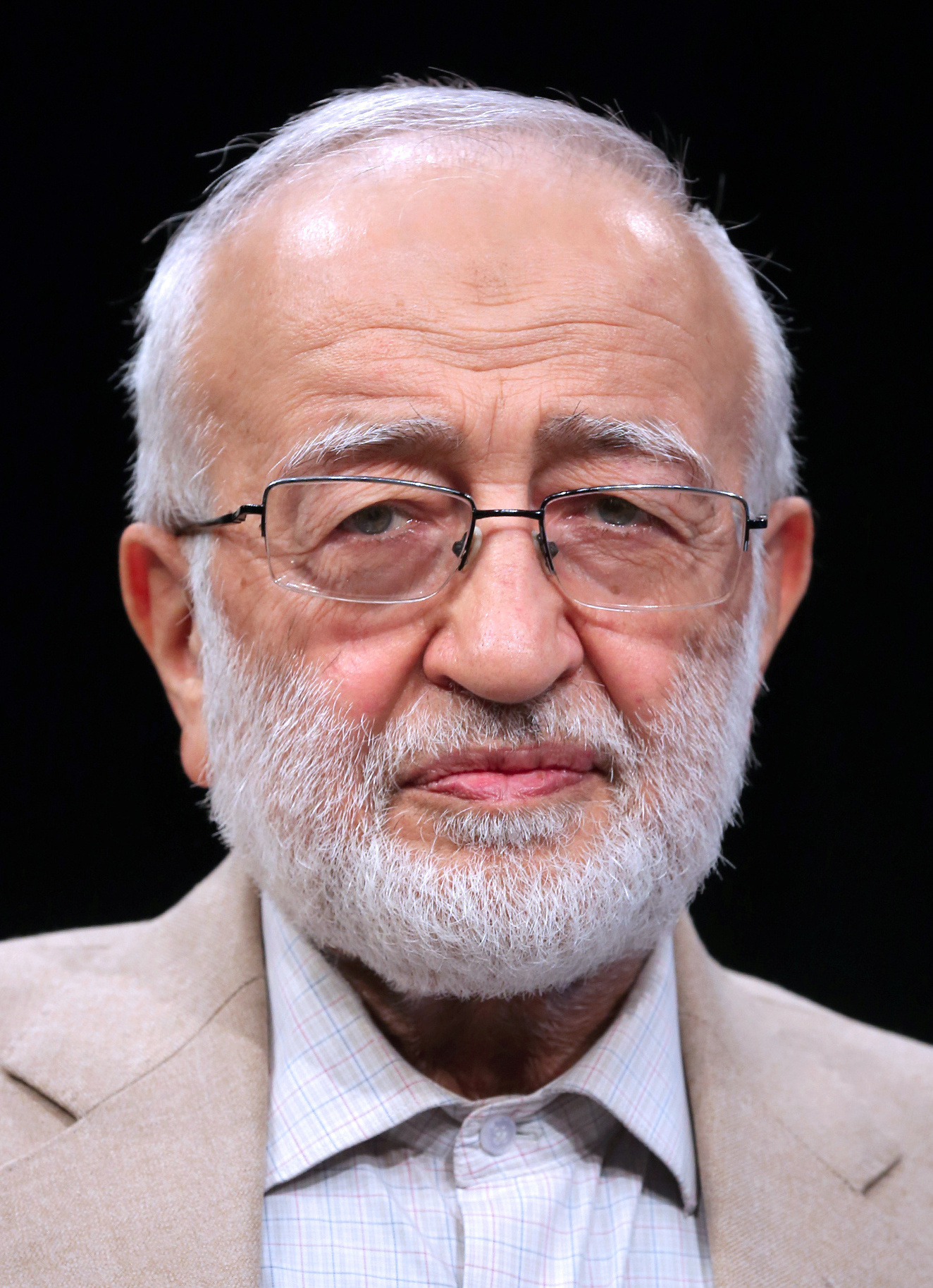
- Nabavi in 2020

Member of Expediency Discernment Council
- Incumbent
- Assumed office 14 March 2012

Minister of Post and Telegraph
- In office 17 August 1981 – 28 October 1985
- Prime Minister: Mohammad-Javad Bahonar; Mohammad-Reza Mahdavi; Mir-Hossein Mousavi
- Preceded by: Mahmoud Ghandi
- Succeeded by: Mohammad Gharazi

Member of the Parliament of Iran
- In office 27 June 1992 – 26 June 1999
- Constituency: Tehran, Rey and Shemiranat

Personal details
- Born: 1947 (age 78–79) Qazvin, Imperial State of Iran
- Party: Islamic Society of Engineers
- Education: Islamic Azad University

Morteza Nabavi (Persian: مرتضی نبوی; born 1947) is an Iranian politician who served as Minister of Post and Telecommunications from 1981 to 1985. He previously served as editor-in-chief of Resalat newspaper, a former member of the Central Council of the Islamic Society of Engineers, and a member of the Expediency Discernment Council from 2012.

== Biography ==
Morteza Nabavi was born in 1947 in Qazvin. He was politically active during the Shah's regime and was imprisoned for a period. He was a member of the Supreme Council for the Resolution of Disputes between Powers, head of the Research Center for Strategic Development Studies, editor-in-chief of the quarterly journal Development Strategy. From 1981 to 1985 he served as the Minister of Post, Telegraph, and Telephone in the Cabinet of Mohammad-Javad Bahonar, in the 1981 Interim Government led by Mohammad-Reza Mahdavi Kani and in the first government of Mir-Hossein Mousavi. He also served as a deputy in the fourth and fifth convocations of the Islamic Consultative Assembly as a representative of the Tehran, Rey, Shemiranat, Eslamshahr and Pardis constituency. Following the 2009 Iranian presidential election protests he claimed that the Ahmadinejad government used the crackdown to sideline conservative elements within the regime. From March 14, 2012 he serves as a member of the Expediency Discernment Council.
