= Ministry of Intelligence (Iran) =

Government ministry of Iran

Coordinates: 35°45′04″N 51°27′25″E

Ministry of Intelligence of the Islamic Republic of Iran
- وزارت اطّلاعات جمهوری اسلامی ایران

- Flag of the Ministry of Intelligence

Agency overview
- Formed: 18 August 1983; 43 years ago
- Preceding agency: Prime Ministry Intelligence Office
- Jurisdiction: Government of the Islamic Republic of Iran
- Headquarters: Hirmand Street, Pasdaran, Tehran
- Employees: Classified (30,000 by estimation of Magnus Ranstorp)
- Minister responsible: Undeclared (Acting)
- Website: vaja.ir

The Ministry of Intelligence (Note: (Persian: وزارت اطّلاعات جمهوری اسلامی ایران, romanized: Vezarat-e Ettela'at Jomhuri-ye Eslami-ye Iran)) is the primary intelligence agency of Iran and a member of the Iranian Intelligence Community. It was initially known as SAVAMA after it took over the Shah's intelligence apparatus SAVAK. The ministry is one of the three "sovereign" ministerial bodies of Iran due to the nature of its work at home and abroad.

== History ==
Reliable and valid information on the ministry is often difficult to obtain. Initially, the organization was known as SAVAMA, and intended to replace SAVAK, Iran's intelligence agency during the rule of the Shah, but it is unclear how much continuity there is between the two organizations—while their role is similar, their underlying ideology is radically different. It is suspected that the new government was initially eager to purge SAVAK elements from the new organization, but that pragmatism eventually prevailed, with many experienced SAVAK personnel being retained in their roles. Former SAVAK staff are believed to have been important in the ministry's infiltration of left-wing dissident groups and of the Iraqi Ba'ath Party.

The formation of the ministry was proposed by Saeed Hajjarian to the government of Mir-Hossein Mousavi and then the parliament. There were debates about which branch of the state should oversee the new institution, and the other options apart from the presidency were the Judiciary system, the Supreme Leader, and Islamic Revolutionary Guard Corps. Finally, the government got the approval of Ayatollah Khomeini to make it a ministry, but a restriction was added to the requirements of the minister: that he must be a doctor of Islam.

The ministry was finally founded on 18 August 1983, either abandoning, silently subsuming, or relegating to hidden existence many small intelligence agencies that had been formed in different governmental organizations. The five ministers since the founding of the ministry, have been Mohammad Reyshahri (under Prime Minister Mir-Hossein Mousavi), Ali Fallahian (under President Ali Akbar Hashemi Rafsanjani), Ghorbanali Dorri-Najafabadi (under President Mohammad Khatami, resigned after a year), Ali Younessi (under President Khatami, until 24 August 2005), Gholam Hossein Mohseni-Ejehei (under President Mahmoud Ahmadinejad, from 24 August 2005 to 24 August 2009) and Heyder Moslehi (under President Mahmoud Ahmadinejad, from 29 August 2009 to 15 August 2013).

=== "Chain" assassinations ===
In late 1998, three dissident writers, a political leader and his wife were killed in Iran in the span of two months.

After great public outcry and journalistic investigation in Iran and publicity internationally, prosecutors announced in mid-1999 that one Saeed Emami had led "rogue elements" in Iran's intelligence ministry in the killings, but that Emami was now dead, having committed suicide in prison. In a trial that was dismissed as a sham by the victims' families and international human rights organisations, three intelligence ministry agents were sentenced in 2001 to death and twelve others to prison terms for murdering two of the victims. Two years later, the Iranian Supreme Court reduced two of the death sentences to life.

=== Foreign executions ===
Masoud Molavi, an online opposition activist, was shot and killed on a street in Istanbul's Şişli neighborhood on Thursday, 14 November 2019. A Turkish security official later claimed Verdanjani's suspected killer had confessed to acting under the orders of two Iranian intelligence officers at the Iranian consulate in Turkey.

On 20 April 2022, according to a statement by the semi-official Fars news agency, Iran's intelligence ministry claimed it had captured three Mossad spies.

In November 2023, former European Parliament Vice-President Alejo Vidal-Quadras was shot in the face in Madrid. The attack, which he survived, is suspected to have connections to Iranian operatives, highlighting Iran's pattern of targeting dissidents abroad.

In April 2025, the Dutch government summoned Iran's ambassador following the exposure of two assassination attempts linked to Tehran. These plots involved the use of criminal networks in Europe to silence critics of the Iranian regime.

In May 2025, British authorities arrested five Iranian nationals suspected of plotting an attack on the Israeli embassy in London. The operation, described as one of the most significant counterterrorism actions in recent years, is believed to have been orchestrated by Iran's IRGC Unit 840.

=== Attempts in the U.S. ===
Masih Alinejad – Iranian agents have been accused of multiple plots to kidnap or assassinate Iranian-American journalist Masih Alinejad in New York. These attempts underscore Iran's efforts to silence dissenting voices even on U.S. soil.

Former U.S. officials – The U.S. Department of Justice has charged Iranian national Shahram Poursafi with plotting to assassinate former National Security Adviser John Bolton. This plot was reportedly in retaliation for the U.S. killing of Iranian General Qasem Soleimani in 2020.

== Financials ==
The ministry received a tenfold increase in fundings in 2024.

== List of ministers ==
No.	Portrait	Minister	Took office	Left office	Time in office	Head of government
1	Mohammad Reyshahri	Mohammad Reyshahri (1946–2022)	15 August 1984	29 August 1989	5 years, 14 days	Mir-Hossein Mousavi
2	Ali Fallahian	Ali Fallahian (born 1949)	29 August 1989	20 August 1997	7 years, 356 days	Akbar Hashemi Rafsanjani
3	Ghorbanali Dorri-Najafabadi	Ghorbanali Dorri-Najafabadi (born 1950)	20 August 1997	9 February 1999	1 year, 173 days	Mohammad Khatami
4	Ali Younesi	Ali Younesi (born 1955)	9 February 1999	24 August 2005	6 years, 196 days	Mohammad Khatami
5	Gholam-Hossein Mohseni-Eje'i	Gholam-Hossein Mohseni-Eje'i (born 1956)	24 August 2005	26 July 2009	3 years, 331 days	Mahmoud Ahmadinejad
–	Majid Alavi	Majid Alavi; Acting	26 July 2009	26 July 2009	1 day	Mahmoud Ahmadinejad
–	Mahmoud Ahmadinejad	Mahmoud Ahmadinejad (born 1956); Acting	28 July 2009	3 September 2009	67 days	Himself
6	Heydar Moslehi	Heydar Moslehi (born 1957)	3 September 2009	15 August 2013	4 years, 23 days	Mahmoud Ahmadinejad
7	Mahmoud Alavi	Mahmoud Alavi (born 1954)	15 August 2013	25 August 2021	8 years, 10 days	Hassan Rouhani
8	Esmaeil Khatib	Esmaeil Khatib (1961–2026)	25 August 2021	18 March 2026 †	5 years, 59 days	Ebrahim Raisi Masoud Pezeshkian

== See also ==
- The Iran Cables (2019)
- Chain murders of Iran
- Oghab 2
- SAVAK
- Iranian external operations
