= Oghab 2 =

Iranian counter-espionage agency

Oghab 2 ("Eagle 2") (Persian: عقاب ۲) is an Iranian counter-espionage agency tasked to protect Iran's nuclear facilities from threats, including sabotage and cyber warfare. According to The New York Times, Iran has acknowledged that it is fighting nuclear espionage, and has foiled attempts to recruit spies and defectors to pass secrets out of their enrichment facilities. The New York Times also states this may be due to efforts rumoured to have started under the George W. Bush administration in the United States to sabotage parts imported into Iran. It is claimed these efforts were accelerated under President Barack Obama's administration, with the facilities facing trouble with poor designs and difficulty obtaining parts, due to sanctions imposed by the United Nations.

== History ==
The agency was formed in December 2005 after two foreign agents were arrested at the then secret sites of Parchin and Lavizan. Today the agency is led by Ahmad Vahidi, a member of Iran's Revolutionary Guard.

== Derailment attempts ==
The New York Times has reported that the Stuxnet computer worm appears to have wiped out roughly a fifth of Iran's nuclear centrifuges, and has delayed the Iranian's nuclear weapons capability. Secretary of State Hillary Clinton has stated that Iran's progress had been set back years, possibly until 2015.

The worm is believed to cause centrifuges to spin out of control damaging themselves, while a pre-recorded version of safety displays is played, showing what normal operations looked like to plant operators, while the centrifuges were being destroyed. The computers of the nuclear facilities are not connected to the Internet, so it is likely that a recruited agent uploaded the virus from the inside, using a USB port.

The United States has neither confirmed nor denied any involvement with the Stuxnet virus. According to the Bulletin of the Atomic Scientists, industrial espionage/sabotage is highly effective, and many industrialised countries are extremely vulnerable to it.

== See also ==
- Ministry of Intelligence and National Security of Iran
- Counter-intelligence and counter-terrorism organizations
- Nuclear program of Iran
- Lawrence Franklin espionage scandal
