= Abbas Vaez-Tabasi =

Iranian Ayatollah (1935-2016)

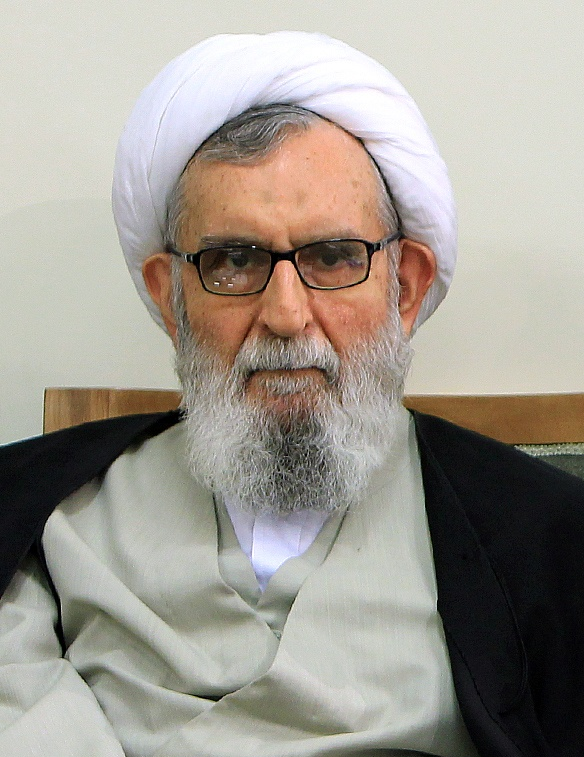

Custodian of the Astan Quds Razavi
- In office 14 February 1979 – 4 March 2016
- Appointed by: Ruhollah Khomeini
- Preceded by: Mohammad-Sadegh Amir-Azizi
- Succeeded by: Ebrahim Raisi

Member of the Assembly of Experts
- In office 19 February 2007 – 4 March 2016
- Constituency: Razavi Khorasan Province
- In office 15 August 1983 – 19 February 2007
- Constituency: Khorasan Province

Personal details
- Born: 25 June 1935 Tabas, Imperial State of Iran
- Died: 4 March 2016 (aged 80) Mashhad, Iran
- Party: Islamic Republican Party (1979–1987)

Abbas Vaez Tabasi (Persian: عباس واعظ طبسی; 25 June 1935 – 4 March 2016) was an influential Iranian cleric who held memberships at different institutions. He was Grand Imam and Chairman of the Astan Quds Razavi board from 1979 until his death in 2016.

== Early life ==
Vaez Tabasi hailed from a family of Mashhadi origin. He was born on 25 June 1935. He began his education when he was only 12 years old in various seminaries.

== Career ==
Vaez Tabasi was a member of Islamic Republican Party's central council, the Expediency Discernment Council and the Assembly of Experts of the Islamic Republic of Iran. He was also the head of the Astan Quds Razavi.

In 2006, he was elected to the Assembly of Experts to the surprise of some observers. However, he retired after declining to run in 2016 election. In May, 2008, Abbas Palizad made declarations at Shiraz Law University, and a few other institutes, alleging that Tabasi, alongside numerous other politicians, had been implicated in money laundering, illicit trade operations, and the establishment of an illicit underground network.

== Personal life ==
Vaez Tabasi's daughter married Supreme Leader Khamenei's son, Sayyid Hassan.

== Illness and death ==
On 2 November 2015, it was announced that he was suffering from cancer. On 27 February 2016, he was hospitalized due to respiratory complications. After a few days of hospitalization, Vaez died on 4 March. He died at the age of 80. Following his death, three days mourning was declared in Khorasan province. His funeral was held on the following day with Ali Khamenei and other officials like President Hassan Rouhani attending the ceremony. He was buried at the Imam Reza shrine. Following his death, all traces of his wealth vanished, leaving his family unable to assert any rights to his estate.

== Revolutionary activities ==
Vaez Tabasi, Ali Khamenei and Syed Abdul Karim Hashemi Nejad were the core of clerics in Mashhad revolutionary activities revolving around the Holy shrine of Imam Reza they managed. He was heavily influenced by the Navvab Safavi during the years 1952 to 1955 in his speeches against the Pahlavi regime takeoff and the speech was prohibited again in 1955 and continued until the fall of the Pahlavi regime. Abbas Vaez Tabasi was first arrested in 1952 and was in SAVAK prison. Abbas Vaez Tabasi first in the year 1955 Mohammad-Javad Bahonar in Rafsanjan was invited to give a speech at a ceremony to be met. Bahonar was speaking before a meeting with issues raised in speeches which were over. After the speech, he was banned from speech.

Non-profit organization positions
Preceded by Mohammad-Sadegh Amir-Azizi	Custodian of Astan Quds Razavi; 1979–2016	Succeeded by Ebrahim Raisi
Political offices
New title Office created	Representative of the Supreme Leader in Khorasan Province; 1979–2016	Succeeded by Ahmad Alamolhoda as Representative of Razavi Khorasan Province
New title Office created	Representative of the Supreme Leader in Khorasan Province; 1979–2016	Succeeded by Alireza Ebadi as Representative of South Khorasan Province
New title Office created	Representative of the Supreme Leader in Khorasan Province; 1979–2016	Succeeded by Abolghasem Yaghoubi as Representative of North Khorasan Province
