= Masoud Molavi =

Member of Iran's intelligence agencies and dissident (1987–2019)

Masoud Molavi Vardanjani
- Born: 28 April 1987; Iran
- Died: 14 November 2019 (aged 32); Turkey
- Cause of death: Assassination
- Citizenship: Iranian
- Education: Islamic Azad University; Tehran University

Masoud Molavi Vardanjani (Persian: مسعود مولوی وردنجانی; 28 April 1987 – 14 November 2019) was a cyber security specialist and Iranian dissident who leaked information about the Islamic Republic. Vardanjani was assassinated in Istanbul, Turkey, in what was widely alleged to be an operation carried out by Iranian intelligence.

Vardanjani was reportedly involved in Iran's cyber defense program, working with the Islamic Revolutionary Guard Corps (IRGC) and the Iranian Ministry of Defense, before later becoming a critic of the government. He operated a Telegram channel called "Black Box", which claimed to publish documents exposing corruption within the Office of the Supreme Leader, the Iranian judicial system, and the Iranian armed forces.

Reuters had reported that Iranian diplomatic officers of the Iranian consulate in Turkey helped assassinate him.

== Academic life ==
He had a Bachelor of Science in construction engineering from Islamic Azad University Najaf Abad Branch and Artificial Intelligence and Robotics from Tehran University.

=== Accusations of fraud ===
Mohammad Jorjandi, has published multiple evidence regarding details of Molavi's fraud, forgery, and malicious activities, on his Telegram Channel and website called "Webamooz"; which conducts investigative journalism on fraud & cybercriminals.

== Flee to Turkey ==
In 2018, Vardanjani fled from Iran to Turkey because he was being investigated by the Iranian government. He made social media posts critical of the Islamic Revolutionary Guard Corps (IRGC) and the Iranian Ministry of Defense. His Telegram channel "Black Box" exposed corruption among Iranian officials.

== Assassination ==
According to Iran Wire citing TRT journalist, Azari Jahromi, Iranian telecommunications minister had threatened him before he was killed.

On November 14, 2019, Vardanjani was assassinated in Istanbul, Turkey by gunshot while walking down a street. Former U.S. Secretary of State Mike Pompeo referred to it as another example of Iran assassinating dissidents.

In 2020, an Iranian embassy in Ankara staff member was arrested in this assassination case.
