= Mehdi Shabzendedar Jahromi =

Iranian Ayatollah

Ayatollah Mehdi Shabzendedar
- مهدی شب‌زنده‌دار
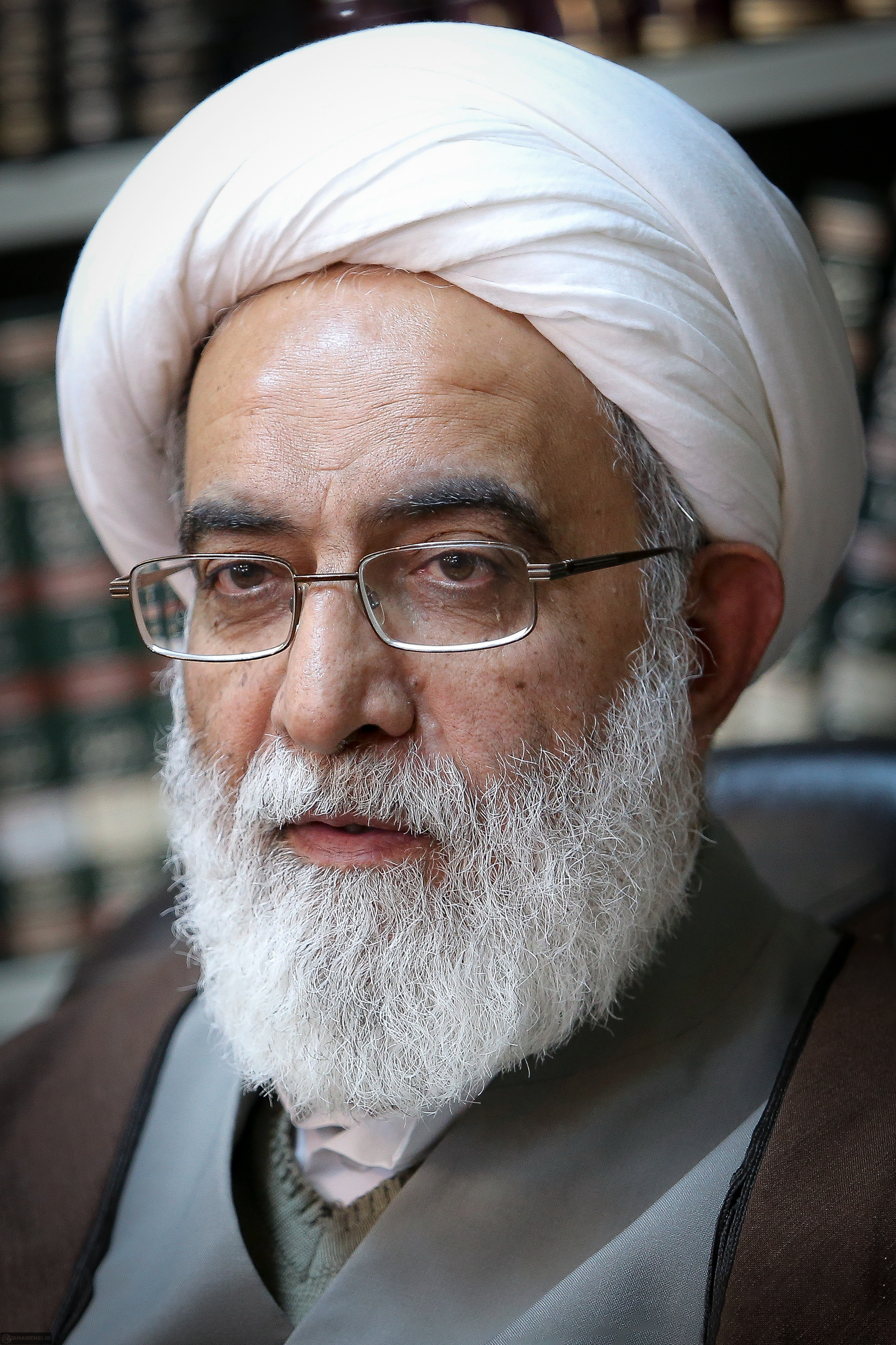
- Born: 1953 (age 72–73); Darab, Fars, Iran

Academic work
- Discipline: Shia scholar

Mehdi Shabzendedar Jahromi (Persian: مهدی شب‌زنده‌دار جهرمی) is an Iranian Shia jurist and member of the Guardian Council."

== Early life ==
He is the son of the late Ayatollah Haj Sheikh Hussein Shabzendehdar Jahromi, a student of Ruhollah Khomeini, and the grandson of Sheikh Gholam Hossein Sharii Shirazi.

== Career ==
He is the principal of the Baghiyato-Allah Institute which trains students in the field of Jurisprudence and Principles. He is a former member of the Society of Seminary Teachers of Qom and the Supreme Council of the Seminary. He was the Qom Seminary Teacher. Following the demise of Gholamreza Rezvani in April 2013, Mehdi Shab Zende Dar by the command of seyyed Ali Khamenei, he became a member of the Guardian Council jury in July 2013. The Guardian Council is a member of the Expediency Discernment Council.

== Education ==
In 1345 AH (1926/1927 CE), Shab Zendeh Dar Jahromi began his seminary studies and preliminary lessons with his father Hossein Shab Zendeh Dar Jahromi, and studied under Seyyed Hassan Taheri Khoramabadi, Ali Meshkini, Mohammad Momen, Ahmad Jannati, Ja'far Sobhani, late Moslehi Araki and Setoodeh. He studied philosophy and theology from Seyyed Reza Sadr, Hassan Hasanzadeh Amoli, Ebrahim Amini, Abdollah Javadi-Amoli and Ansari Shirazi. His teachers in lessons and principles of jurisprudence were Kazem Garoubi Tabrizi, Morteza Haeri Yazdi, Hossein Vahid Khorasani, Mirza Jawad Tabrizi and Haj Moussa Shobeiri Zanjani. Shab Zendeh Dar's Qom Seminary level courses have been taught for nearly 15 years, teaching the principles of Fiqh.

== Activities ==
- Membership in the Society of Seminary Teachers of Qom
- Member of the Guardian Council constitution
- Representing the Supreme Council of the Board of Trustees of the International Center for Islamic Sciences and seminaries abroad
- Chairman and member of the Jurisprudence and Consultative Council of the Guardian Council
- Secretary and member of the Supreme Council of Seminary

== See also ==
- Hossein Shabzandehdar Jahromi
