= Ali Younesi =

Iranian cleric and politician

- علی یونسی
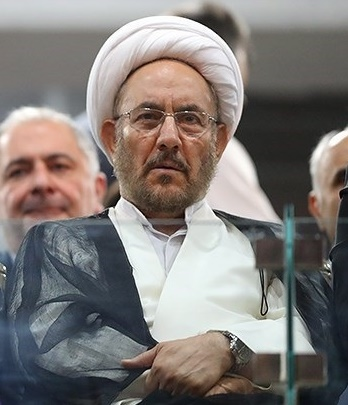
- Ali Younesi in September 2016

Special Aide to the president of Iran for Ethnic and Religious Minorities Affairs
- In office 22 August 2013 – 24 November 2018
- President: Hassan Rouhani
- Preceded by: Position established
- Succeeded by: Position abolished

Minister of Intelligence
- In office 24 February 1999 – 24 August 2005
- President: Mohammad Khatami
- Preceded by: Ghorbanali Dorri-Najafabadi
- Succeeded by: Gholam Hossein Mohseni-Ejehei

Personal details
- Born: Mehr-Ali Younesi; 26 August 1955 (age 71) Nahavand, Iran
- Spouse: Sediqeh Jalalvand
- Children: 5

Ali Younesi (born 26 August 1955) is an Iranian politician, who served in different positions.

== Education ==
Younesi is a graduate of the Haqqani school in Qom.

== Career ==
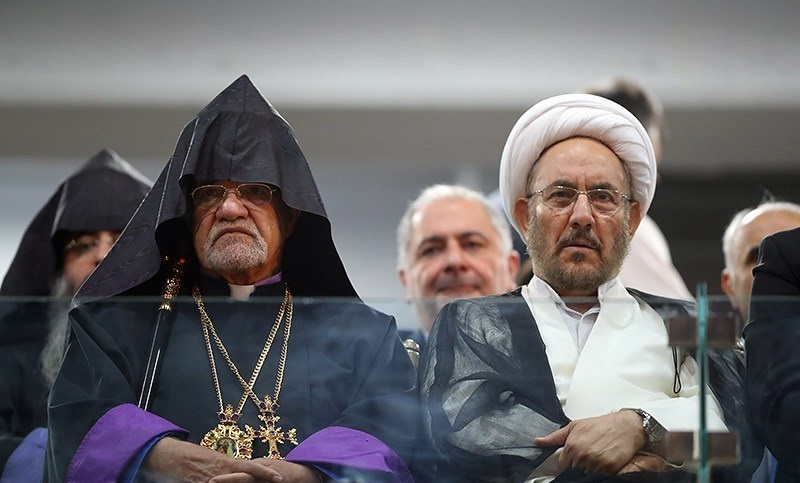
Opening ceremony of Pan-Armenian Games at the Ararat Stadium on 13 September 2016: Sepuh Sargsyan (left) and Ali Younesi (right)

Following the Islamic Revolution, Younesi became the head of the Islamic Revolutionary Court of Tehran and later head of the politico-ideological bureau of Islamic Revolutionary Guards. He was minister of intelligence and a member of the Supreme National Security Council during the presidency Mohammad Khatami. He was Hassan Rouhani's adviser on political and security affairs.

== Personal life ==
On 24 January 2026, Younesi's son Hassan, in response to the high casualty rate of the 2025–2026 Iranian protests, wrote on X: "I am disgusted by the government and the leadership that ordered this crime and massacre. I am disgusted by the government that became complicit in this crime, disgusted by the reformists that justified this massacre, and I am with the sons and daughters of Iran in their grief and mourning."

Political offices
Preceded by Ghorbanali Dorri-Najafabadi	Chief of intelligence ministry of Iran; 2000–2005	Succeeded by Gholam Hossein Mohseni-Ejehei
