= The Iran Cables (2019) =

The Iran Cables was a comprehensive reporting project of The Intercept in partnership with the New York Times detailing the level of influence that Iran has had on Iraq since the 2003 United States invasion of Iraq. This series of in-depth articles published on November 18, 2019, is based on a leak of over 700 pages of Iranian intelligence reports provided to The Intercept by an anonymous source.
