= Mohammad-Reza Tavassoli =

Iranian Ayatollah (1931-2008)

Ayatollah Mohammad-Reza Tavassoli
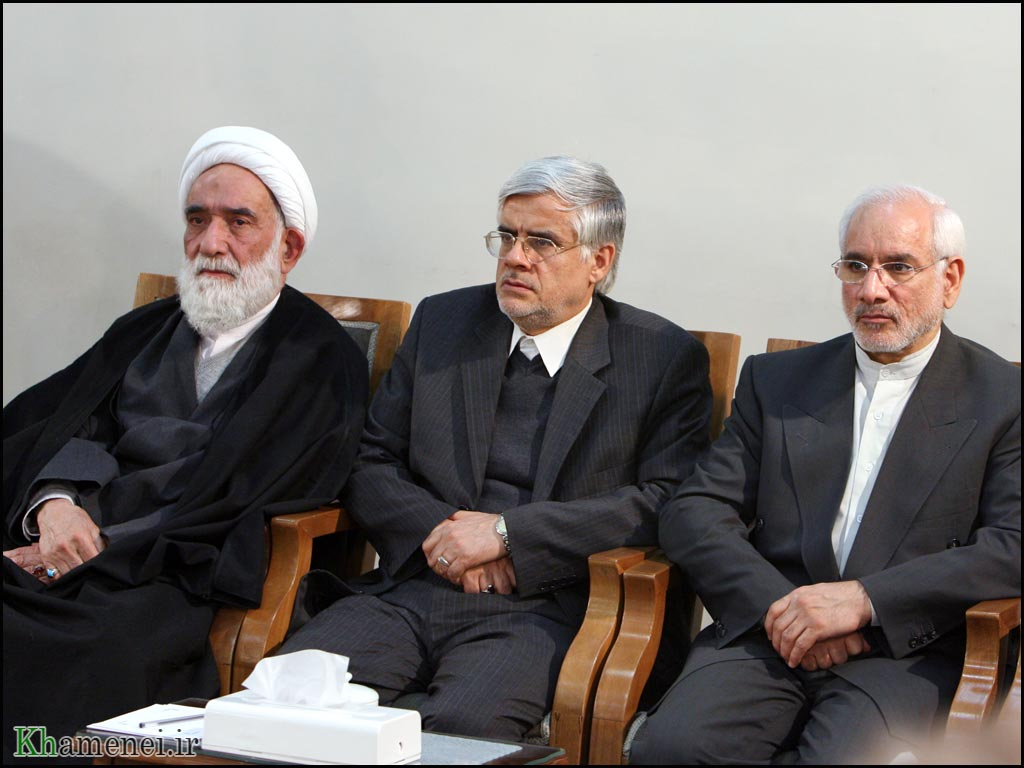
- Tavassoli in a meeting with Ali Khamenei in 2007

Chief of Staff to the Supreme Leader
- In office 1979–1989
- Supreme Leader: Ruhollah Khomeini
- Preceded by: Office established
- Succeeded by: Mohammad Mohammadi Golpayegani

Personal details
- Born: 1931 Iran
- Died: 16 February 2008 (aged 76–77) Tehran, Iran
- Resting place: Mausoleum of Ruhollah Khomeini

Ayatollah Mohammad Reza Tavassoli (Persian: محمدرضا توسلی; 1931 – 16 February 2008) was an influential Iranian theologian, reformist politician, a close associate of Ayatollah Ruhollah Khomeini, and was the first chief of staff of the Office of the Supreme Leader of Iran from 1979 to 1989. Tavassoli was a member of the Expediency Discernment Council of the Islamic Republic of Iran. He belonged to the Militant Clerics League. Ayatollah Tavassoli simultaneously held a seat in the 3rd Assembly of Experts.

Tavassoli died on 16 February 2008, from a heart attack, while delivering a speech to the Expediency Council. He was 77 years old at the time of his death.

== See also ==
- List of members of Constitutional Amendment Council of Iran
- List of ayatollahs
