= Yousef Saanei =

Iranian Grand Ayatollah (1937-2020)

- يوسف صانعى
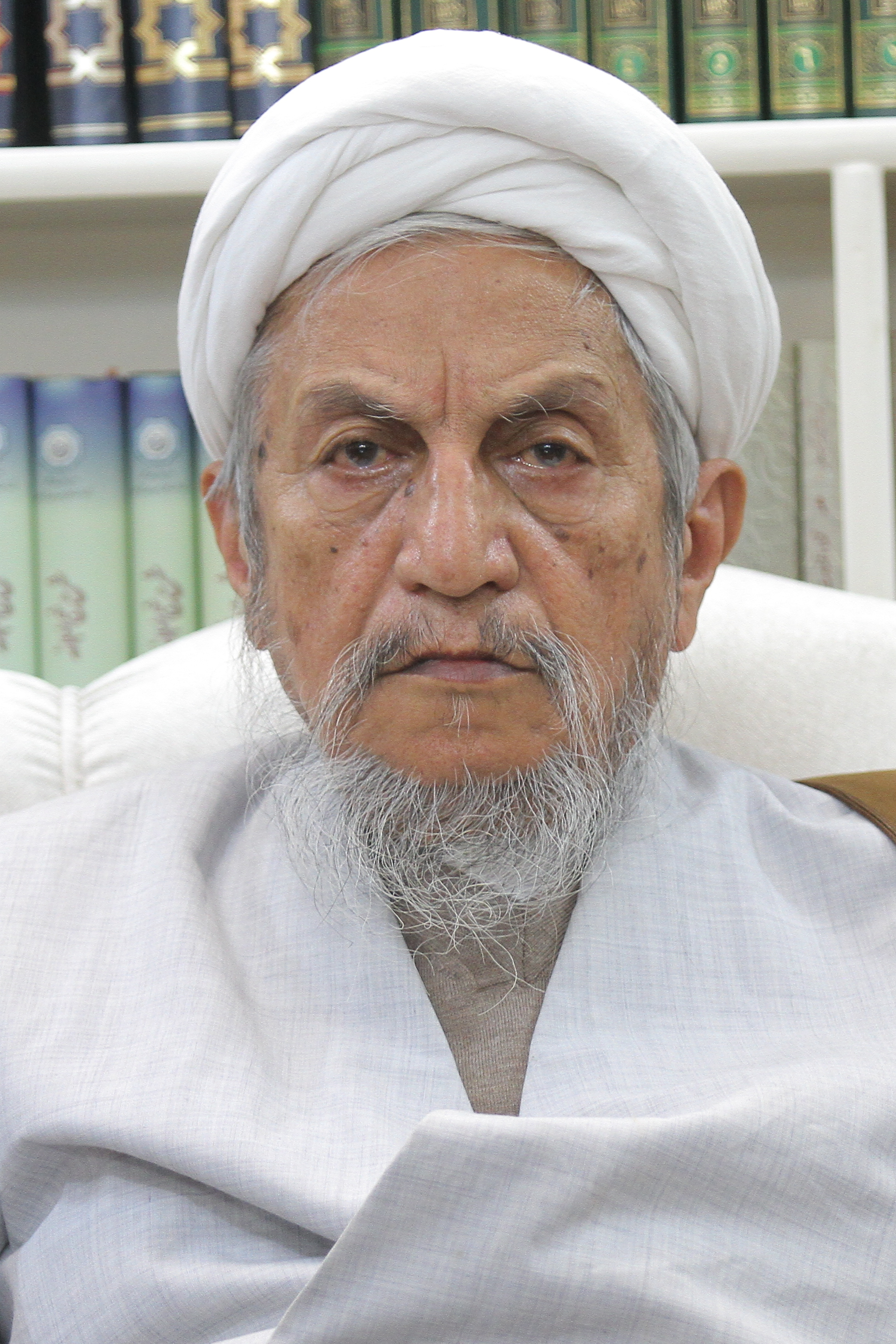
- The late Grand Ayatollah Yousef Saanei in his office.
- Title: Grand Ayatollah

Personal life
- Born: 16 October 1937 Isfahan, Iran
- Died: 12 September 2020 (aged 82) Qom, Iran
- Political party: Islamic Republican Party (1980s)
- Main interest(s): Politics, Jurisprudence, Marja'yah and Theology
- Relations: Hassan Sane'i (brother)

Member of the Assembly of Experts
- In office 10 December 1982 – 8 October 1990
- Preceded by: Office Began
- Succeeded by: Ahmad Khomeini
- Constituency: Tehran Province

Prosecutor-General of Iran
- In office 1983–1985
- Appointed by: Ruhollah Khomeini
- Preceded by: Mohammad-Mehdi Rabbani Amlashi
- Succeeded by: Mohammad Mousavi Khoeiniha
- Website: Official website

Religious life
- Religion: Islam
- Jurisprudence: Twelver Shia
- Creed: Usuli

Yousef Saanei (Persian: يوسف صانعى; 16 October 1937 – 12 September 2020) was an Iranian Twelver Shi'a Marja' and politician, a member of the Islamic Republic of Iran's powerful Guardian Council from 1980 to 1983 and also Attorney-General of Iran from 1983 to 1985.

Whether he was a Marja' (Grand Ayatollah) was disputed. His calls for radical political reform in Iran were very controversial and in 2010 the government-sponsored "Qom Theological Lecturers Association" (Jame-e-Modarressin) declared him no longer qualified for emulation as a Grand Ayatollah. However, many of his followers continued to consider him their Marja, and this was acknowledged by several influential Maraji such as Grand Ayatollah Ali al-Sistani, Naser Makarem Shirazi, Abdul-Karim Mousavi Ardebili, and Hossein Noori Hamedani.

== Family, early life, and education ==
Saanei was born in the Persian month of Mehr 1316 SH and in the month of Shaban 1356 AH in the semi-desert farming village of Yingabad (now Nikabad), 60 km (37 mi) southwest of Isfahan. He was the third of four children (a fifth child died in infancy) of Hujjud-al-Islam Mohammed Ali Saanei (1892–1974) and his wife Sharbonoo (1899–1947). His father, despite having lost his own father at the age of six, and being partially sighted rose from untrained village mullah to study in hawza in his thirties, going on to serve his community for fifty years. Mohammad Ali's father Hajjmulla Yousef Yingabadi (1867–1899) was an Isfahan-trained cleric known for his strong sense of social justice, and was active in the Isfahan-area activities of Ayatollah Shirazi's tobacco movement in the early 1890s.

At age six he began his education at the local maktab, later studying at home with his father after the latter noticed his intellect, studying the Quran and other basic texts of the period. Shortly before his tenth birthday, in the autumn of 1947, together with his father and brother Hassan (who also became a cleric and political official) he left for hawza in Isfahan, studying at that city's Kasseh Garan Madrassa (his father later returned to Nikabad). In Isfahan, his most noted teacher was the historian Allamah Mirza Mohammed Ali Habib Abadi (1890–1976).

Saanei completed his preliminary studies (the equivalent of secondary school) in 1951, whereupon he went to Qom to continue his studies. 1955 saw Saanei place well in the first-level examinations (equivalent to a bachelor's degree) thus awarded the commendation of Grand Ayatollah Borujerdi. While at Qom he was a student of the leading theologians of his day, among them Mohammad Mohaghegh Damad, Abbas Ali Shahroudi, Mohammad Ali Araki, and Borujerdi himself for about a year. His most lasting education came from the seven years he spent being taught by Khomeini until the latter's exile in 1964. At the age of 22, he was granted the degree of Ijtihad allowing him to formulate religious judgements for his own use.

In September 1964, Ayatollah Saanei married Khanum Shafiei (d. 2012) and has two sons and a daughter. One son, Fakruddin (Saeed) is also a cleric, with the honorific of Hujjud-al-Islam.

== Career ==
He taught regularly in the hawza of Qom beginning in the 1950s. In 1975, Saanei became a teacher at the Haghani School of Divinity. Later he became Grand Ayatollah. In 1980, he was appointed chairman of the Guardian Council. Saanei retired from the council in 1983 and has not held any political office since. According to the CBS GlobalPost, Saanei has been considered "the successor" of Grand Ayatollah Hussein-Ali Montazeri and as "the spiritual leader" of the Iranian political opposition movement. After the urging of many students and scholars, Saanei published his risalah in 1993, thus becoming a Marja', or source of imitation on matters of religious law to others.

== Death ==
Ayatollah Saanei fell at his Qom home on the night of 10 September, fracturing his pelvis and arm. Due to preexisting conditions (he suffered from Diabetes-related kidney problems, as well as cirrhosis of the liver), he died during dialysis treatment before surgery could be safely performed to repair his injuries. He died shortly after the time of Fajr prayer on 12 September 2020. Due to COVID-19 pandemic precautions, no public funeral was held. The Ayatollah was buried in Sheikhan Cemetery located near Fatima Masumeh Shrine in Qom. He was survived by his three children. Tributes were paid to him from many parts of the clerical establishment and wider society, including the Supreme Leader, Ayatollah Khemanei and the Society of Seminary Teachers of Qom.

== Views ==
=== Inheritance ===
He held in the area of inheritance that:

- A non-Muslim can inherit from a Muslim just as a Muslim can inherit from a non-Muslim.
- An illegitimate child inherits from and through both his natural parents, but they cannot inherit from him.
- A widow is entitled in addition to a share of her deceased husband's movable property, to the monetary value in the same proportion of the real estate.
- If the widow is the only heir, she inherits all of her husband's property, not just the share specified in the Quran.

=== Betting, prizes and gambling ===
- Betting by spectators and participants in sports and contests is permissible.
- Government-sponsored and private lotteries and raffles are allowed, provided the proceeds go to a charitable purpose, even if the player's intent was to win a prize, and not motivated by the charitable donation.
- The use of gambling tools, arcade games, or board games for entertainment purposes is allowed.
- Prizes in academic competition are permissible.
- Any type of game or contest where the organizer/owner can collect all the participants money, and use it to enrich themselves is unlawful gambling.
- Playing with gambling tools, such as cards or backgammon, with the intent of gambling is unlawful.

=== Halal meat ===
- The person performing Halal slaughter may be a non-Muslim and it is sufficient to invoke the name of God (and a blessing) in any language at the commencement of the slaughter.
- If Halal meat is unavailable, it is permissible to eat non-Halal meat, if doing so will relieve hardship.

=== Adoption ===
The foster parent of an adopted child should treat the child in all respects as their own, including the mother not having to observe hijab around a male child; however this does not extend to inheritance absent the permission of the Quranic heirs.

=== Nuclear weapons ===
In an interview with The San Francisco Chronicle, Grand Ayatollah Yousef Saanei said:

"There is complete consensus on this issue. It is self-evident in Islam that it is prohibited to have nuclear bombs. It is eternal law, because the basic function of these weapons is to kill innocent people. This cannot be reversed."

Ayatollah Yousef Saanei said clerical authorities have quietly expressed opposition to the development of weapons of mass destruction for many years, and he described it as the reason that Iran never retaliated with chemical weapons when Saddam Hussein used them to kill Iranian troops and Iran-backed Kurds during the 1980– 88 Iran-Iraq war. "You cannot deliberately kill innocent people," he said.

=== Women ===
He has declared that women have equal status in Islam. Saanei held that a woman can lead a man in prayer, although a man leading is mustahab. Like Zohreh Sefati, he believed that women can even become a marja' in Islam, i.e. that men and women can follow a female Islamic jurists' ijtihad.

=== Suicide bombing ===
He is particularly noteworthy for issuing a fatwa in which he declared suicide bombing as haram and a "terrorist act".

=== 2009 Iranian election ===
During the 2009 Iranian election protests, rumours arose that he had issued a religious edict proclaiming that Mr. Ahmedinejad was "not the president and that it is forbidden to cooperate with his government." These rumours were reported as such by several internet news agencies.

=== Forced confessions ===
He is reported to have said during a 12 August speech at Gorgan that "Confession in prison and detention has not been and is not valid ... all persons who have somehow been involved in issuing these confessions are sharing same sin ... they will receive the retribution of their perfidious acts in this world and in a fair, righteous court."

=== Islamic democracy ===
Saanei was an outspoken Islamic democracy activist and has even called for the "discussion" of the clerical control of the Iranian government. He held that the Velayat-e-faqih should have the support of the people (i.e. be elected).

=== Ethnic minorities ===
Having studied in clerical schools in Qom, Iraq and Tabriz; Saanei was raised fluent in the Persian, Arabic and Azerbaijani languages.

== After the death of Hossein Ali Montazeri ==
According to one report, Saanei was likely to replace Hossein-Ali Montazeri as the leading clerical opponent of the regime and to be even more aggressive. Saanei declared the government illegitimate and warned that it "cannot reverse the situation in the country with terror, killing, torture and imprisonment."

A day after the funeral procession of Montazeri, around 1,000 members of Iran's Basij militia and "plainclothes men" attacked offices of Saanei in the central shrine city of Qom, a reformist website reported on 22 December 2009. The plainclothes militiamen broke the windows of Saanei's office and insulted him and his staff and also beat up his staff. They also put up posters of Iran's supreme leader Ali Khamenei, who has been a staunch defender of hardline President Mahmoud Ahmadinejad's controversial June re-election and who ordered a post-election crackdown on opposition protests. Police sided with the militia and prevented Saanei's supporters from defending his office, the website said. There was no immediate official comment. However, earlier on Tuesday, the semi-official Fars News Agency said pro-government theology students had staged a rally in Qom to protest "the insult against sanctifies" during Montazeri's funeral procession. The demonstration ended outside Saanei's home, Fars said, but it was not clear whether it was linked to the attack on Saanei's house reported by the aforementioned reformist website. The demonstrators chanted "The city of Qom is no city for hypocrites," and signed a statement calling for Saanei to be defrocked, Fars reported. One of the signatories, cleric Ahmad Panahian, said: "The trenches of the hypocrites in Qom must be destroyed."

On 3 October 2010, news sites linked with Iran's political opposition movement reported that Saanei's website was blocked. According to The New York Times, "Internet users who attempted to access them ... were automatically redirected to a standard Iranian government filtering page which offers links to government-authorized web sites ... and the official web site of Iran's Supreme Leader, Ayatollah Ali Khamenei."

== Demotion from religious authority ==
On 2 January 2010, a top clerical body in Qom, the Society of Seminary Teachers of Qom, declared that Saanei no longer qualified to be a marja al-taqlid, or a source of emulation – the highest clerical rank in Shia Islam. The body said that it had launched a yearlong investigation into the qualifications of Saanei in response to repetitive inquiries on the issue. In a statement bearing the signature of Ayatollah Mohammad Yazdi, the former head of Iran's judiciary, the body announced that the result of the investigation indicate that Saanei is not eligible to be a marja'.

Conservatives and traditionalists condemned this move by Ayatollah Mohammad Yazdi of Hoze Modaresin to disqualify Ayatollah Saanei as a Marja', questioned the authority of the government sanctioned and subsidised association, and pointed out that even Ayatollah Sistani is not even listed by them as such.

Legal offices
Preceded by Mohammad Mehdi Amlashi	Attorney-General of Iran; 1983–1985	Succeeded by Mohammad Mousavi Khoeiniha
