= Mohammad-Reza Modarresi Yazdi =

Iranian Ayatollah

Ayatollah; Seyyed; Mohammad Reza Modarresi-Yazdi
- محمد رضا مدرسی یزدی
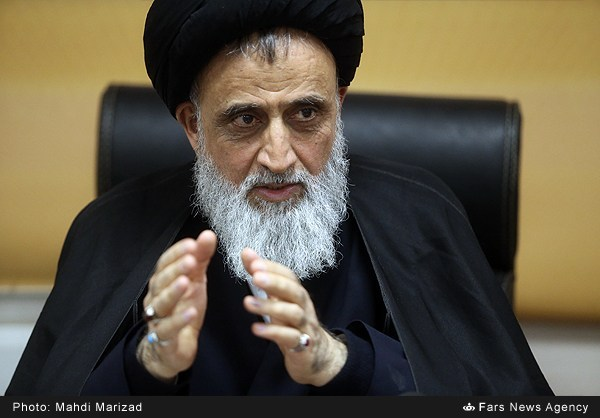
- Ayatollah Seyed Mohammad Reza Yazdi during a press conference in 2016.

Member of the Assembly of Experts
- Incumbent
- Assumed office 8 March 2022
- Constituency: Razavi Khorasan Province
- Majority: 1,053,385

Personal details
- Born: 1955 (age 70–71) Yazd, Iran

Ayatollah Mohammad Reza Modarresi-Yazdi (born 1955 in Yazd) is one of the 12 members of the Guardian Council of the Islamic Republic of Iran and also a member of the Assembly of Experts.

== See also ==
- List of ayatollahs
