= Mohammad Momen =

Iranian Ayatollah (1938-2019)

Ayatollah Mohammad Momen
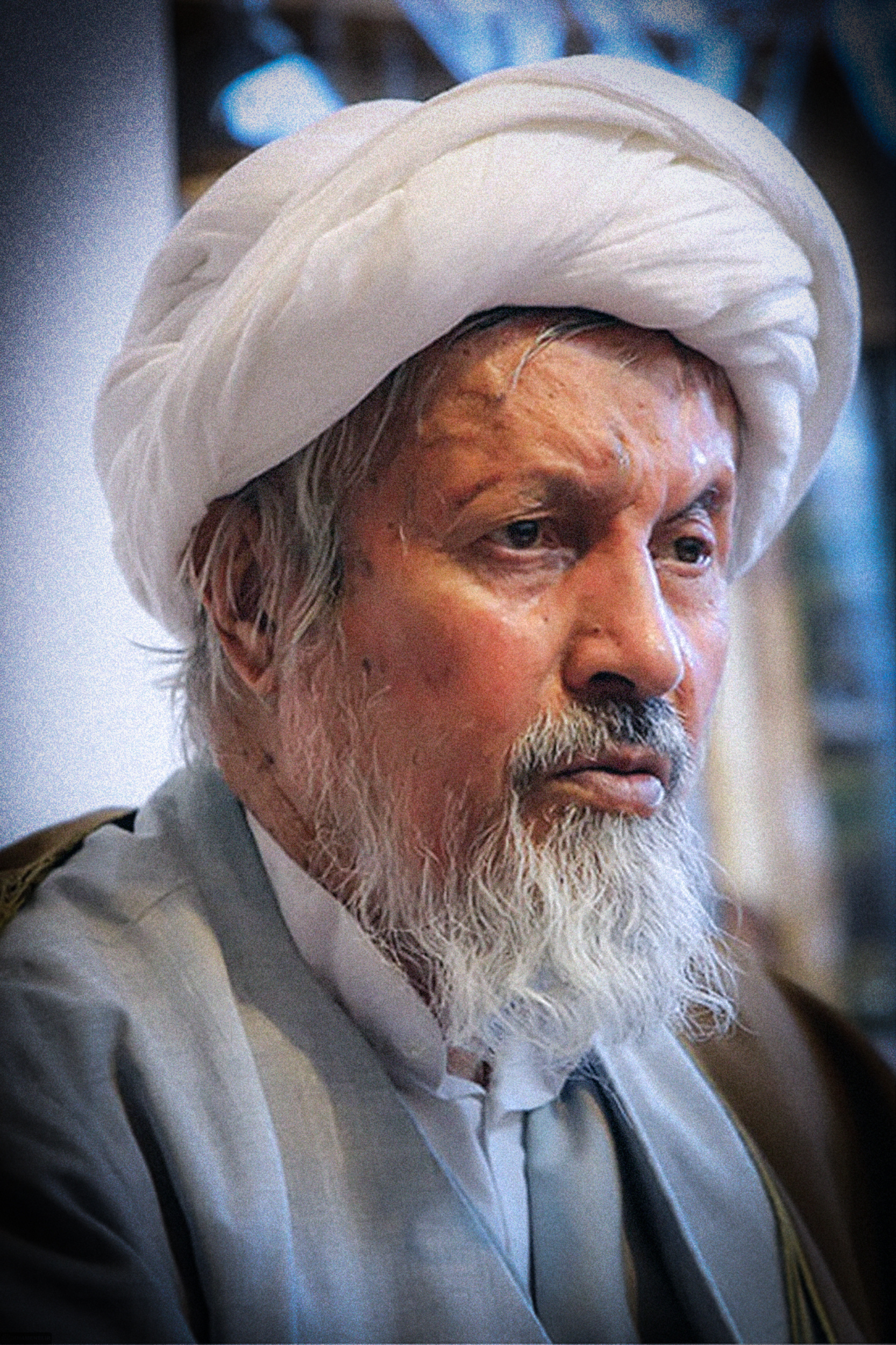

Personal life
- Born: 13 January 1938 Qom, Iran
- Died: 21 February 2019 (aged 81) Tehran, Iran
- Resting place: Fatima Masumeh Shrine, Qom
- Education: Hawza Najaf

Religious life
- Religion: Shia Islam
- Profession: Faqih; politician

Member of the Assembly of Experts
- In office 3 September 2001 – 21 February 2019
- Constituency: Qom Province
- In office 15 August 1983 – 22 February 1999
- Constituency: Semnan Province

Member of the Guardian Council
- In office 17 July 1983 – 21 February 2019
- Appointed by: Ruhollah Khomeini; Ali Khamenei

Personal details
- Party: Society of Seminary Teachers of Qom

Ayatollah Mohammad Momen (13 January 1938 – 21 February 2019) was a Faqih and a very influential member of the Guardian Council of the Islamic Republic of Iran.

== Influence in government ==
He simultaneously sat on the Expediency Discernment Council and the Assembly of Experts, representing the Islamic holy city of Qom in the latter and winning in the 2006 Iranian Assembly of Experts election. He gained a very large percentage of the vote. His opponent, Ayatollah Mohammad Taqi Mesbah-Yazdi, was a strong supporter and spiritual mentor of President Mahmoud Ahmadinejad, and his victory has been interpreted by some as a sign of dissatisfaction with Ahmedinejad's policies. Because of his political influence in the government, Siyasat, a conservative weekly periodical, had been touted, along with the hard-line conservative Ayatollah Morteza Moghtadai, to be a possible replacement for Judiciary Chief Ayatollah Mohammad Yazdi.

== Political position ==
He was a moderate conservative, and was considered to be an excellent student of the Qur'an. He was a notable figure among fundamentalists in Iran. Some considered him to be more of a theologian than a politician.
