= Hujjat al-Islam =

Islamic honorific title

Hujjat al-Islam (Arabic: حجة الإسلام, romanized: ḥujjat ul-Islām, Persian: حجةالاسلام or حجت‌الاسلام, romanized: hojjat-ol-Eslām) is an Islamic honorific title which translates in English to "authority on Islam" or "proof of Islam".

The title "Hujjat al-Islam" is given to scholars with a high level of Islamic expertise and Islamic theology. Essentially, one who acquires this title is considered to be an authority on Islam worthy of respect. The person with this title is also able to provide guidance and clarify topics on issues in the Islamic community. The term "Hujjat al-Islam" has different connotation to Sunnis and Shias.

== History of the Title ==
The title Hujjat al-Islam has a significant weight within the Islamic community. It offers historical significance, educational purposes and responsibilities, traditional continuation, and ethical guidance. This term, first established in the beginning of Islamic history, used to refer to figures who served as authorities, but now it is used to refer to the scholars who have Islamic knowledge. Individuals with this title are looked upon due to their deep knowledge of Islam. They could be responsible to teach Islamic classes, provide fatwas on legal and ethical issue, and they can interrupt Islamic teaching to others. Since the term was established, it held a valuable meaning within the Islamic community. It serves as a mark of honor and the term continues to be used to this day.

== Sunni Islam ==
Its first recorded use was in a Sunni context, as a title for the 11th-century theologian al-Ghazali, due to his refutations of Hellenistic-influenced philosophers and Isma'ilis. It was later used as a term of respect for judges. Unlike in Shia Islam, Hujjat al-Islam is not as commonly used in the Sunni branch of Islam. Hujjat al-Islam serve more as teachers and guiders for their community, rather than a scholars. They may also be referred to as sheikhs or imams. They are also in charge of providing legal fatwas on religious information.

In the contemporary era, Egyptian Muhaddith Qadi Ahmad Shakir would confer the title "Hujjat al-Islam" to his teacher Muhammad Rashid Rida, upon his death. Deobandis granted this title to their leader Hanafi Maturidi theologian Muhammad Qasim Nanautavi for his debates with scholars of other religions and establishing Darul Uloom Deoband.

== Shia Islam ==
The title of the "Hujjat al-Islam" is primarily popular in the Shia branch of Islam. In the Twelver Shia the title is awarded to scholars. Its earliest attested use, for a Shia personage, was during the Qajar period for Muhammad al-Baqir (d. 1843). It was originally applied as an honorific to leading scholars, but now the use indicates a status in the hierarchy of the learned below ayatollah.

Shias believe that Imam al-Mahdi was the twelfth Imam after Muhammad. They await his return in order to bring peace, unity, and guidance to their community. In Shia Islam, Hujjaj al-Islam are supposed to be an authority in order to guide them until the return of Imam al-Mahdi while preserving and continuing his teachings.

== See also ==
- List of hujjat al-Islams
- Shaykhism
- Shaykh of Sufism
- Seghatoleslam
- Mohyeddin
- Sufism
- Islamic religious leaders
