= Mohammad-Ali Movahedi Kermani =

Iranian Ayatollah (born 1931)

Ayatollah Mohammad-Ali Movahedi Kermani
- محمدعلی موحدی کرمانی
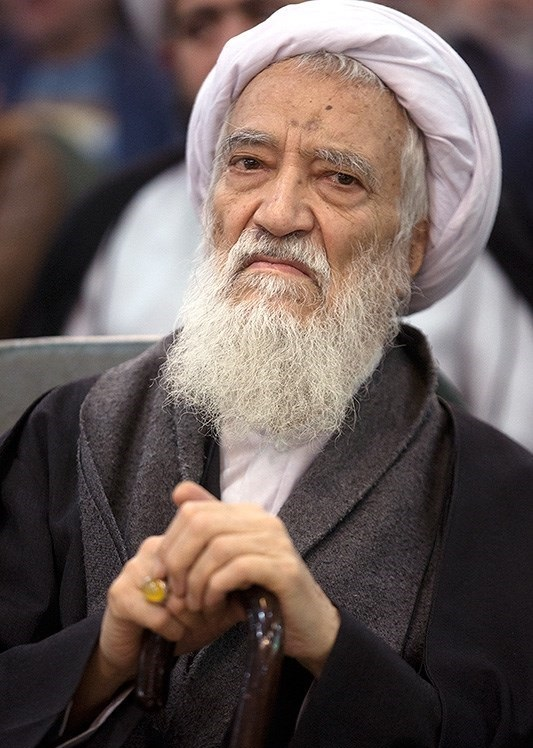
- Ayatollah Mohammad-Ali Movahedi Kermani

Chairman of the Assembly of Experts
- Incumbent
- Assumed office 21 May 2024
- Supreme Leader: Ali Khamenei; Mojtaba Khamenei
- Preceded by: Ahmad Jannati

Acting Chairman of the Expediency Discernment Council
- In office 29 December 2018 – 30 December 2018
- Preceded by: Mahmoud Hashemi Shahroudi
- Succeeded by: Sadeq Larijani
- In office 1 February 2017 – 14 August 2017
- Preceded by: Akbar Hashemi Rafsanjani
- Succeeded by: Mahmoud Hashemi Shahroudi

Tehran's Ephemeral Friday Prayer Imam
- Incumbent
- Assumed office 2 December 2012
- Appointed by: Ali Khamenei

Member of Assembly of Experts
- Incumbent
- Assumed office 14 July 1983
- Constituency: Kerman province (1983–2016); Tehran province (2016–present)

Member of the Parliament
- In office 28 May 1980 – 28 May 2000
- Constituency: Kerman (1980–1984); Tehran, Rey, Shemiranat and Eslamshahr (1984–2000)

Member of Expediency Discernment Council
- In office 4 October 1989 – 20 September 2022
- Appointed by: Ali Khamenei
- Chairman: Akbar Hashemi Rafsanjani; Mahmoud Hashemi Shahroudi; Sadeq Larijani

Personal details
- Born: 1931 (age 94–95) Kerman, Pahlavi Iran
- Party: Combatant Clergy Association
- Other political affiliations: Islamic Republican Party (1979–1987)

Ayatollah Mohammad-Ali Movahedi Kermani (Persian: محمدعلی موحدی کرمانی; born 22 March to 22 June 1931) is Tehran's Friday Prayer Ephemeral Imam and the former secretary-general of Combatant Clergy Association. He is also a member of the Assembly of Experts. He is a conservative and principlist politician.

He was formerly one of the deputy speakers in the Islamic Consultative Assembly.

== Political career ==
Movahedi won 685,974 votes of the Kerman province for his re-election to the 4th Assembly of Experts. He was ranked 2nd after Ahmad Khatami in the constituency.

== Views ==
In 2019, Mohammad Ali Movahedi Kermani in Tehran Friday prayer declared that Telegram is haram and requested a National Information Network deployment like the great firewall of China. Movahedi-Kermani asserts that one must adhere to the instruction of the Chief Islamic Jurisprudent, according to the doctrine of Velayat-e faqih. He also believes that the United States is trying to "portray the clergy and religion as failures."

== See also ==
- List of ayatollahs
- List of Iranian officials
- List of members in the First Term of the Council of Experts

Political offices
Preceded by Ahmad Jannati	Chairman of the Assembly of Experts; 2024–	Succeeded by Incumbent
Assembly seats
Preceded by Ali Akbar Parvaresh	2nd Vice Speaker of Parliament of Iran; 1993–1994; 1995–2000	Succeeded by Hossein Hashemian
Preceded by Hossein Hashemian	2nd Vice Speaker of Parliament of Iran; 1993–1994; 1995–2000	Succeeded by Mohammad Reza Khatami
Party political offices
Preceded by Mohammad Reza Mahdavi Kani	Secretary-General of the Combatant Clergy Association; 2014–2018	Succeeded by Mostafa Pourmohammadi
