= Mahmoud Hashemi Shahroudi =

Iranian Ayatollah (1948–2018)

Seyyed Mahmoud Hashemi Shahroudi
- محمود هاشمی شاهرودی
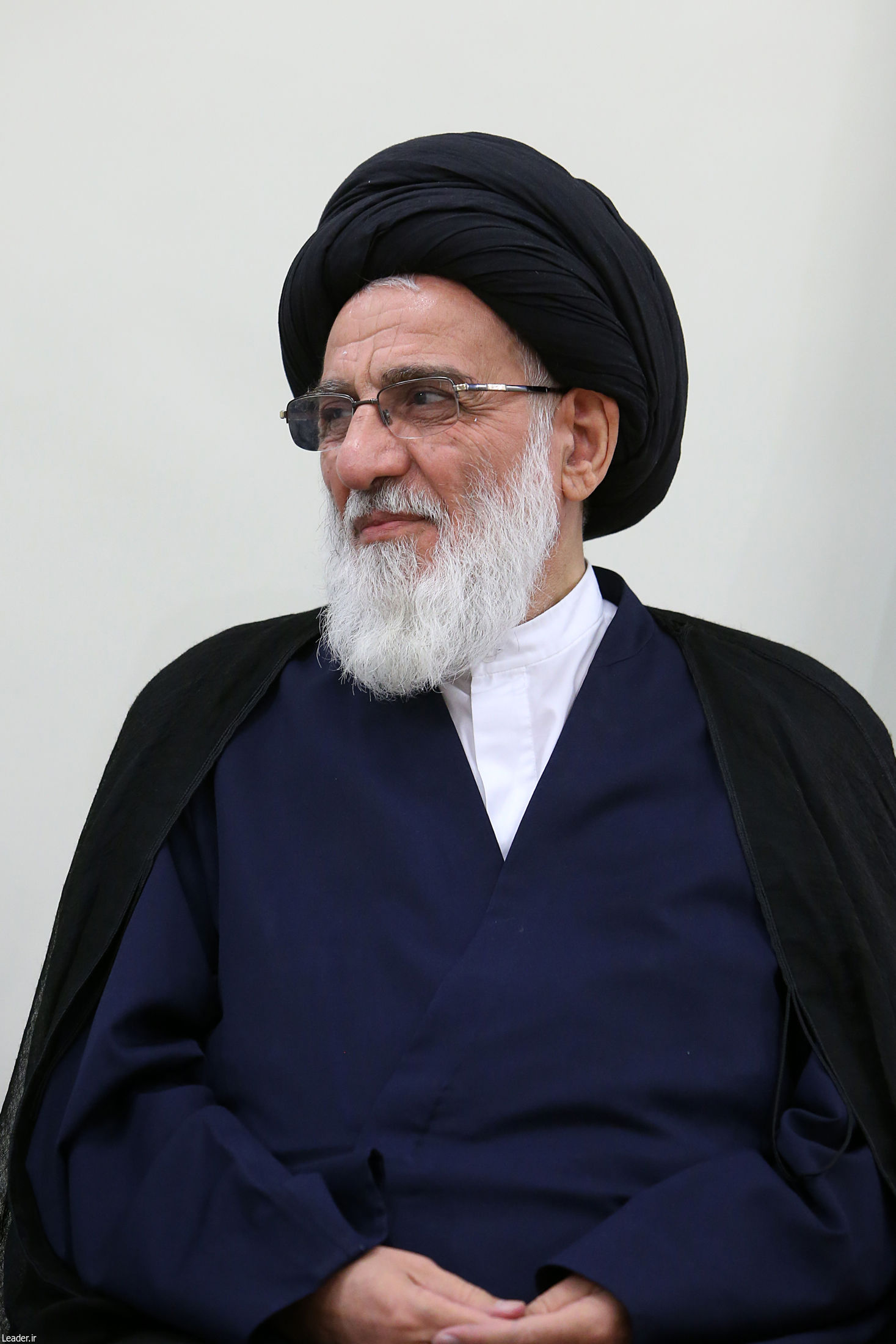

3rd Chairman of Expediency Discernment Council
- In office 14 August 2017 – 24 December 2018
- Appointed by: Ali Khamenei
- Preceded by: Akbar Hashemi Rafsanjani
- Succeeded by: Sadeq Larijani

Chairman of the Assembly of Experts Acting
- In office 21 October 2014 – 10 March 2015
- Supreme Leader: Ali Khamenei
- Preceded by: Reza Mahdavi Kani
- Succeeded by: Mohammad Yazdi

5th Chief Justice of Iran
- In office 14 August 1999 – 14 August 2009
- Appointed by: Ali Khamenei
- Preceded by: Mohammad Yazdi
- Succeeded by: Sadeq Larijani

Member of Assembly of Experts
- In office 24 February 1999 – 24 December 2018
- Constituency: Razavi Khorasan Province
- Majority: 1,499,109

Personal details
- Born: Mahmoud Hashemi Shahroudi; 15 August 1948 Najaf, Iraq
- Died: 24 December 2018 (aged 70) Qom, Iran
- Resting place: Fatima Masumeh Shrine, Qom
- Citizenship: Iranian and Iraqi
- Party: Society of Seminary Teachers of Qom; Islamic Dawa Party
- Website: www.hashemishahroudi.org

Mahmoud Hashemi Shahroudi (Persian: محمود هاشمی شاهرودی; 15 August 1948 – 24 December 2018) was an Iranian-Iraqi Twelver Shia cleric and principlist politician who was the chairman of the Expediency Discernment Council from 14 August 2017 until his death on 24 December 2018. He was previously the chief justice of Iran from 1999 to 2009.

He was also an Iraqi citizen and a former member of the Islamic Dawa Party. Shahroudi's official English-language biographical information from the Iranian Assembly of Experts' website opens with his education received in Najaf, Iraq from Muhammad Baqir al-Sadr, the Islamic Dawa Party's founder, and takes the view that al-Sadr was killed; al-Sadr was executed without trial by Saddam Hussein's regime in April 1980. Hashemi Shahroudi became the leader of the Supreme Council for the Islamic Revolution in Iraq, which caused objections to his serving as the Head of Iran's Judiciary. He was a member of Iran's Guardian Council.

Upon accepting his position as the Head of Iran's Judiciary, Shahroudi proclaimed: "I have inherited an utter ruin from the previous judiciary," referring to Mohammad Yazdi's 10 years in office. He appointed Saeed Mortazavi, a well known fundamentalist and controversial figure, prosecutor general of Iran. Later when Mortazavi led the judiciary against Khatami's reform movement, Shahroudi was prevented by regime hardliners from stopping Mortazavi's violent acts against dissidents or removing him from power. In July 2011 Shahroudi was appointed by Supreme Leader Ali Khamenei to head an arbitration body to resolve an ongoing dispute between Mahmoud Ahmadinejad and the parliament. He was a favorite as one of the potential successors of Ali Khamenei as Supreme Leader of Iran.

According to one of his former alleged students, Shahroudi was considered among the wealthiest of Shi'i scholars in Iran, having amassed a substantial multi-million dollar revenue generating income from an export-import business. In 2010, he declared himself a Marja'.

== Early life ==
Ayatollah Mahmoud Hashemi Shahroudi was born in Najaf, Iraq, to ethnic Persian parents. His father, Ali Hosseini Shahroudi was a scholar and teacher at the Najaf seminary and Ayatollah Mahmoud Hashemi Shahroudi completed elementary schooling at Najaf's Alaviye school before going to seminary. Ayatollah Khomeini and Muhammad Baqir al-Sadr were his teachers in Najaf. When he came to Iran following the Iranian Revolution, he taught at Qom and Hassan Nasrallah, former secretary-general of the Lebanese political and paramilitary party Hezbollah, was one of his students.

== Works ==
Selected works include:

- Dars-nāma-ye Uṣūl al-Fiqh
- Kitāb al-Ḥajj
- al-Ṣirāṭ (Ajwibat al-Istiftāʾāt)
- Manshūr-e Siyāsat
- Mobāreze bā Mafāsed
- Ḥoqūq-e Shahrvandī
- Bidārī-ye Islāmī

== Political career ==
=== Before the Iranian Revolution ===
In 1974, Ayatollah Shahroudi was imprisoned by the Ba'ath Party, due to political activities related to the Dawa Party.

=== After the Iranian Revolution ===
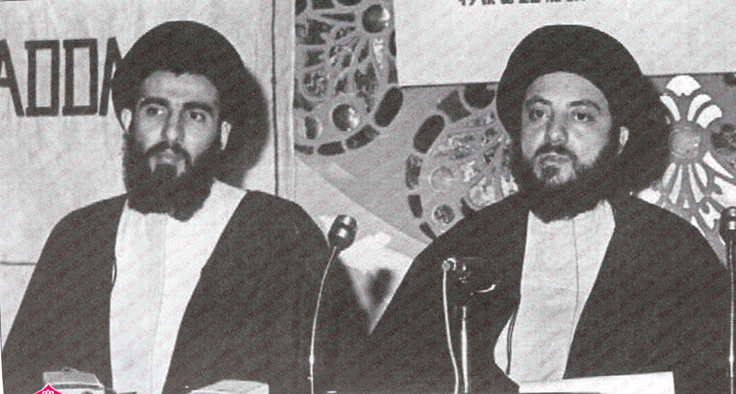
Shahroudi with Mohammad Baqir al-Hakim

After the Iranian Revolution, Shahroudi moved to Iran. Ayatollah Shahroudi helped preserve the relationship between Ayatollah Khomeini and Muhammad Sadiq al-Sadr, as well as relaying the messages of Marja in Najaf to Ayatollah Khomeini. He was elected as a member of guardian council in 1995. Then he was appointed the head of the Judiciary in 1999. In July 2011, Shahroudi was appointed by the Supreme Leader Ali Khamenei to head an arbitration body to resolve an ongoing dispute between president Mahmoud Ahmadinejad and the parliament. The five-member body which Shahroudi headed is made up of "hard-liners known for their opposition to any reforms within the ruling system", according to the Associated Press news agency. The appointment was seen as a move to sideline or weaken the past President of Iran Hashemi Rafsanjani who helmed the Expediency Council, a body set up to arbitrate disputes within the ruling system in the Islamic Republic. Rafsanjani had alienated Khamenei and the Islamic establishment with "his tacit support" for opposition to the controversial June 2009 presidential elections results that re-elected president Ahmadinejad.

Shahroudi denounced ISIL as a terrorist organization that commits the worst sins of killing people in the name of jihad. Shahroudi had also denounced ISIL for wrecking the infrastructure of civilizations and countries, and for committing murder.

== Appointment as Chief Justice ==
=== Career in juridical power ===
After Ayatollah Khamenei became leader of the Islamic Republic, Ayatollah Yazdi served as the president of the Supreme Court. He remained in the post for many years before being replaced by Ayatollah Shahroudi.

=== Prosecution of parliament members ===
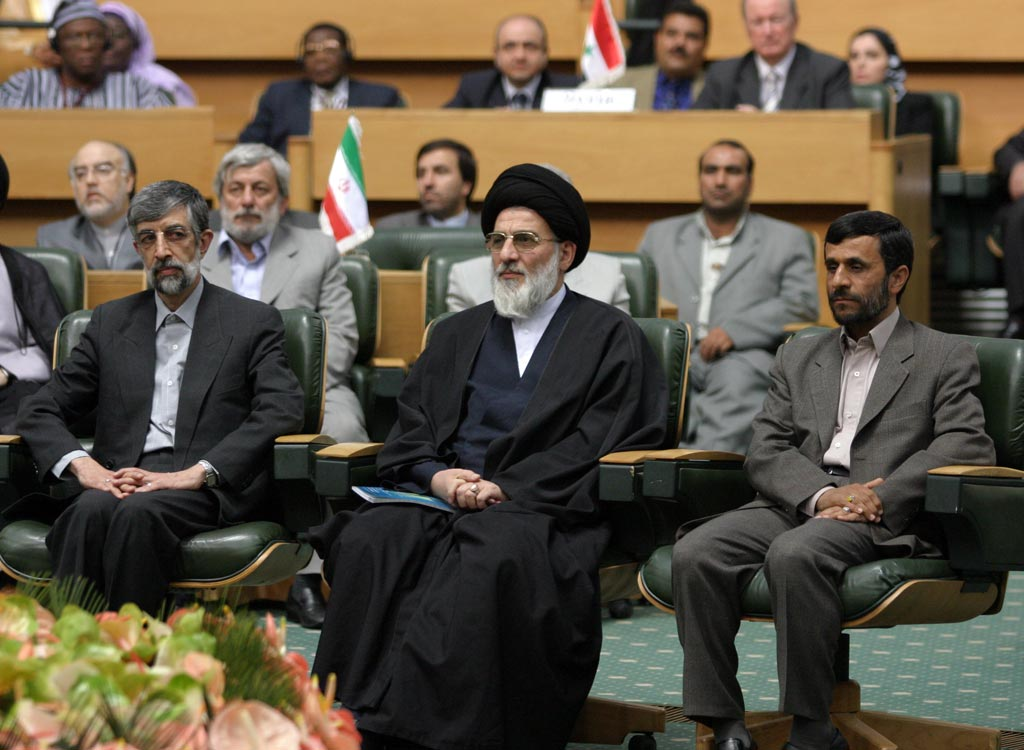
Shahroudi along with Mahmoud Ahmadinejad and Gholam-Ali Haddad-Adel

In 2001, the judiciary prosecuted several reformist members of parliament for speeches and activities they had carried out in their capacity as MPs. The Iranian constitution grants immunity to members of parliament during their tenure and the courts have no right to put MPs on trial for speeches given in parliament. The incident led to a major conflict between Iranian president Mohammad Khatami and Chief of Judiciary Shahroudi. In a letter, Khatami protested the courts' prosecution of MPs, insisting the act contravened the political immunity which the Iranian Constitution has provided for the deputies. The notice prompted Shahroudi to respond, calling Khatami's letter "a surprise." "Since judges, according to the Constitution and ordinary laws as well as the jurisprudential principles, are independent in their interpretation of the law and issuing verdicts, nobody -- not even the judiciary chief -- has the right to impose its interpretation of the law on judges," Shahroudi said in part of his letter to President Khatami. Shahroudi denounced reformist MPs, stating they weakened parliament by defending "westernized" journalists and other liberals.

=== Decriminalization Bill ===
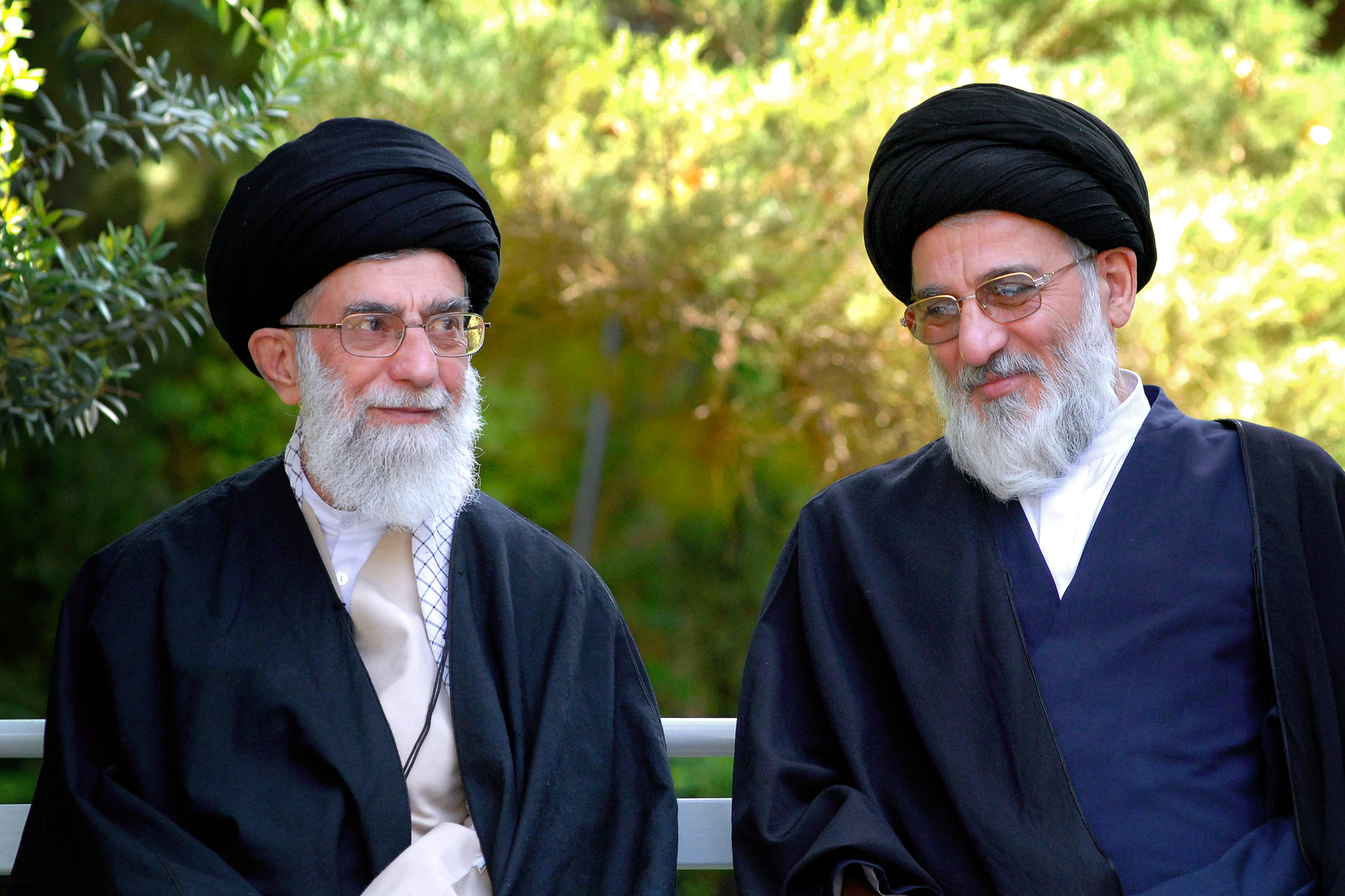
Shahroudi (right) with Supreme Leader Ali Khamenei

The Decriminalization Bill (Persian: تعيين مجازات‌های جايگزين) refers to a legal bill submitted by the Iranian Judiciary to the parliament. It aims at substituting imprisonment and execution by educational workshops and social penalties. The bill is considered one of the most important legal bills to have been prepared by the Iranian judiciary during Shahroudi's tenure.

According to the bill, for all minor crimes, whose punishment is less than six months of imprisonment, imprisonment will be substituted with social penalties. This category of crimes include crimes related to traffic, environmental, medical, family, cultural and hunting offenses. The bill also demands that criminals undergo an educational or skill training course convened by the judiciary system.

The bill also addresses the crimes conducted by minors in the three age categories 7–12, 12-15 and 15–18 years old. It is reminiscent to the Iranian criminal law of 1925. According to the bill, minors can no longer be executed. The bill is based on several years of continuous discussion with religious scholars at the seminaries.

According to the bill, the crimes conducted by children of 7–12 years old are not punishable. For the 12-15 and 15-18 age ranges, imprisonment is replaced by mandatory training and education programs. For the age category of 15–18, execution is applied for crimes like murders if and only if the judge is confident that the criminals are mentally developed as adults and the crime is intentional and premeditated. However, both teenagers and young adults (older than 18) with low mental development, cannot be sentenced to death.

In 2009, the bill was approved by the judiciary commission of the Iranian parliament. The bill will be ratified after the approval of the parliament and the guardian council.

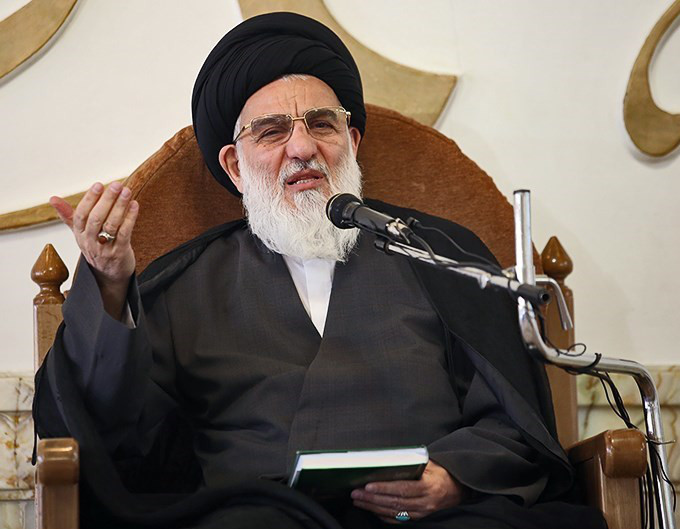
Shahroudi speaking in Fatima Masumeh Shrine in Qom, April 2015

Shahroudi is most notable in the West for instituting Iran's 2002 moratorium on stoning as a form of capital punishment. The penalty remains on the books however, leaving open the possibility that the moratorium could again be overturned as it was in 2006 and 2007.

=== 2009 Bill on Iran's Bar Association ===
In 2009, Shahroudi offered a bill to the Iranian parliament that targets the independence of Iran's Bar Association. According to this bill, lawyers will be watched by the Iranian ministry of Intelligence and their credentials depend on the approval of the intelligence service.

=== Restriction of media ===
In 2009, Shahroudi issued an order to restrict people's access to Iranian Satellite TV Channels and to prosecute staff of Satellite TV Channels whose opinion is not in line with that of the Islamic Republic. People who support these channels and Internet users who do not act according to the line of the constitution can be punished with up to five years of imprisonment.

== Political and social positions ==
- Chairman of the Expediency Council
- Member of the World Assembly of Ahl al-Bayt
- Member of the World Assembly for the Rapprochement of Islamic Religions
- Chairman and founder of the Encyclopedia of Islamic Jurisprudence on the religion of the Ahl al-Bayt
- Member and Vice President of the Assembly of Leadership Experts
- Member and Vice President of the Expediency Council
- Member of Qom Seminary Teachers Association
- Member of the jurists of the Guardian Council
- Head of the Judiciary
- Chairman of the High Board for Dispute Resolution and Regulation of the relations between the three powers

== Illness and death ==
Demonstrators protesting against Mahmoud Hashemi Shahroudi at Hannover Neurology Hospital

Shahroudi was admitted to a Tehran hospital in May 2017 due to illness. Some other officials, including the Iranian Supreme leader Ali Khamenei, visited him. Shahroudi's physician indicated that his surgery was for a "fairly common digestive disorder". In January 2018, Shahroudi's son announced that he had traveled abroad to continue the treatment but did not refer to the country in which the further treatment was sought. The Hannoversche Allgemeine newspaper reported on 4 January 2018 that Shahroudi was currently in the International Neuroscience Institute in Hannover, Germany.

The news agencies then confirmed the news, a photo of Shahroudi was published along with Majid Samii, who heads the center. Shahroudi's presence draw a lot of criticism in Germany. The mass-circulation Bild daily's front-page headline Monday read: "Death judge in Iran, luxury patient in Germany." At the same time, many Iranians from Germany resorted to the Neurology Clinic. So from these protests and criticisms made to Samii, a physician and surgeon in the Iranian brain, conducted an interview with the BBC Persian Department, claiming that he was not aware of the policy because of his departure. A poster on Instagram wrote that "Any medicine that treats a patient with sex, race, sexual orientation, politics, or any other component".

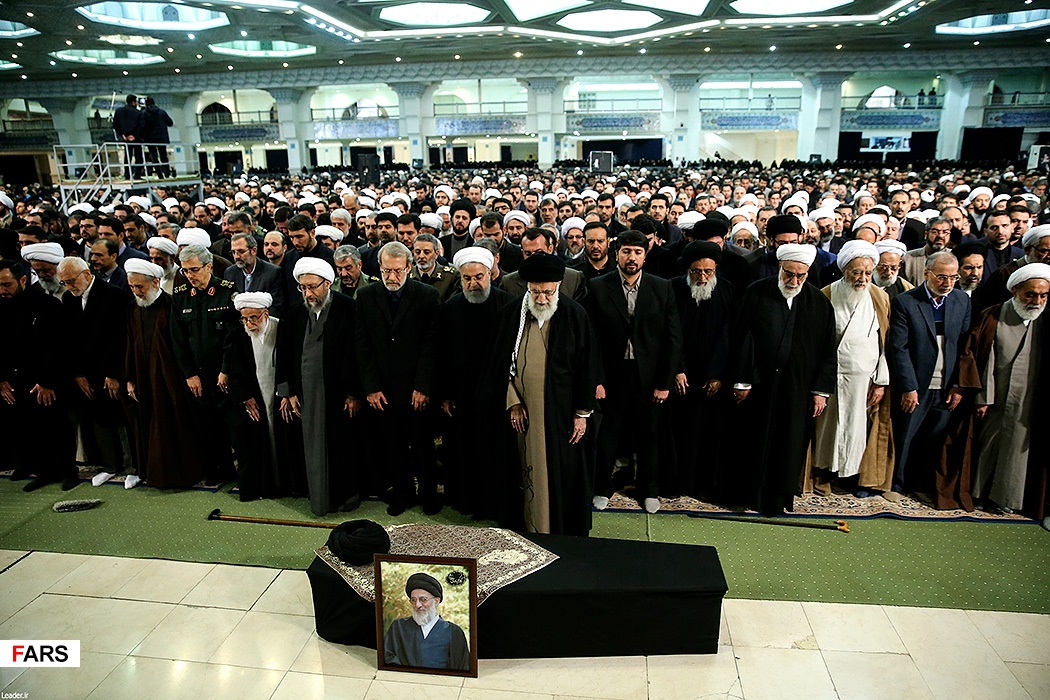
Funeral of Hashemi Shahroudi led by Ali Khamenei

With the rise of protests, Volker Beck, a Green Party member and former German MP, reportedly sued Shahroudi on charges of "murder" and "crimes against humanity." However, the complaint did not finally come to a close, and Shahroudi left Germany for two days in the territory two days later. He later announced in an interview that he had been insinuing doctors to Germany, and he himself had opposed it. Bild and Hannoversche Allgemeine newspapers have reported that Shahroudi had a brain tumor.

On 23 December 2018, it was reported by some Iranian media outlets that Shahroudi had died. However, the news was not confirmed by his family. His medicine team announced that Shahroudi was in a coma and that there was no hope for his recovery. On 22:04 IST of the following day, his death was announced. He was 70. A state funeral was held on 26 December in Tehran and he was buried at Fatima Masumeh Mosque in Qom.

== Criticism ==
Shahroudi received criticism from a number of Iranian scholars and lawyers. Mostafa Mohaghegh Damad, a well-known Iranian scholar and expert on Islamic law, wrote a letter criticizing Shahroudi in August 2009.

== See also ==
- List of ayatollahs
- Iranian Criminal Code

Legal offices
| Preceded by Mohammad Yazdi | Chief Justice of Iran; 1999–2009 | Succeeded by Sadeq Larijani |
Political offices
| Preceded by Ali Movahedi-Kermani; Acting | Chairman of Expediency Discernment Council; 2017–2018 | Succeeded by Ali Movahedi-Kermani; Acting |
