= Ahmad Mohseni Garakani =

Iranian Ayatollah

Ayatollah Sheikh Ahmad Mohseni Garakani
- آیت الله شیخ احمد محسنی گرکانی
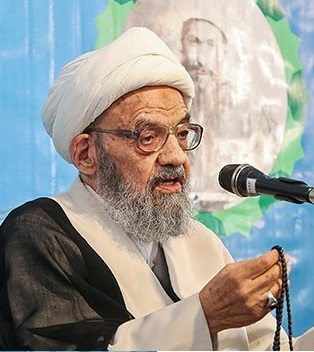
- Ayatollah Garakani giving a lecture in 2015

Chief of the Supreme Court of Iran
- In office 11 September 2009 – 2 September 2014
- Appointed by: Sadeq Larijani
- Preceded by: Hossein Mofid
- Succeeded by: Hossein Karimi

Member of the Third, Fourth, and Fifth terms of the Assembly of Experts
- In office 23 October 1998 – 20 May 2024
- Preceded by: Abolfazl Khonsari
- Constituency: Markazi Province

Imam of Friday Prayer in Tuyserkan
- In office 24 September 1979 – 1982
- Appointed by: Ruhollah Khomeini
- Succeeded by: Abdolhossein Sabzevari
- احمد محسنی گرکانی
- Title: Ayatollah

Personal life
- Born: 1926 (age 99–100) Garakan, Imperial State of Iran
- Parent: Ali Asghar Garakani (father)
- Political party: Society of Seminary Teachers of Qom
- Education: Qom Hawza; Hawza Najaf

Religious life
- Religion: Islam
- Jurisprudence: Twelver Shia Islam

Muslim leader
- Teacher: Hossein Borujerdi; Ruhollah Khomeini; Abu al-Qasim al-Khoei

Sheikh Ahmad Mohseni Garakani Persian: شیخ احمد محسنی گرکانی, (born 1926) is an Iranian Ayatollah. He was the Imam of Friday Prayer in Tuyserkan and the Chief of the Supreme Court of Iran, as well as representing the people of Markazi province in the Assembly of Experts from 1998 to 2024.

== Biography ==
Ahmad Garakani was born on 1926 in a village called Garakan in Markazi province. His father, Ali Asghar was a farmer. After attending primary school, Garakani pursued his Islamic education by travelling to Qom in 1946 to attend the Qom Seminary. He attended classes from many esteemed Shia scholars such as Hossein Borujerdi, Ruhollah Khomeini, and Mohaghegh. He travelled to Najaf and attended the Hawza Najaf for around a year. While in Najaf, he was taught by Abu al-Qasim al-Khoei, Muhsin al-Hakim and others. After the 1979 Iranian revolution, he was appointed as the prayer leader in Tuyserkan by Khomeini. He spent several years as a judge in the Supreme Court, before being elected as Chief of Supreme Court by Sadeq Larijani in September 2009.

== Teachers ==
Here are some of Ayatollah Garkani's teachers on his journey to becoming an Ayatollah.

- Ruhollah Khomeini
- Muhsin al-Hakim
- Abu al-Qasim al-Khoei
- Hossein Borujerdi
- Mohammad-Reza Golpaygani
- Muhammad Husayn Tabatabai
- Seyed Mahmoud Hosseini Shahroudi
- Sheikh Mahdi Mazandarani
- Seyed Reza Sadr
- Sheikh Abbas Tehrani
- Seyed Hossein Tabatabai Qomi
- Sheikh Mohammad Lakani
- Sheikh Mohammad Mojahedi Tabrizi

== Works ==
Ayatollah Garakani has published many works in Iran, here are some of them.

- Hijab in Islam
- Friday Prayers
- Tafsir Surah al-Jumu'ah
- Tafsir Surah al-Munafiqun
- The Guardianship of Ahlul Bayt (as)
- Zakat (charity) in Islam
- The Message of Action
- Velayat Faqih and the Position of Leadership Experts

== See also ==
- List of ayatollahs
- List of members in the Third Term of the Council of Experts
- List of members in the Fourth Term of the Council of Experts
- List of members in the Fifth Term of the Council of Experts
- Judicial system of the Islamic Republic of Iran
- Zaynolabideen Ghorbani
