= 2025 assassination of Iranian Supreme Court judges =

2025 assassination of Iranian judges

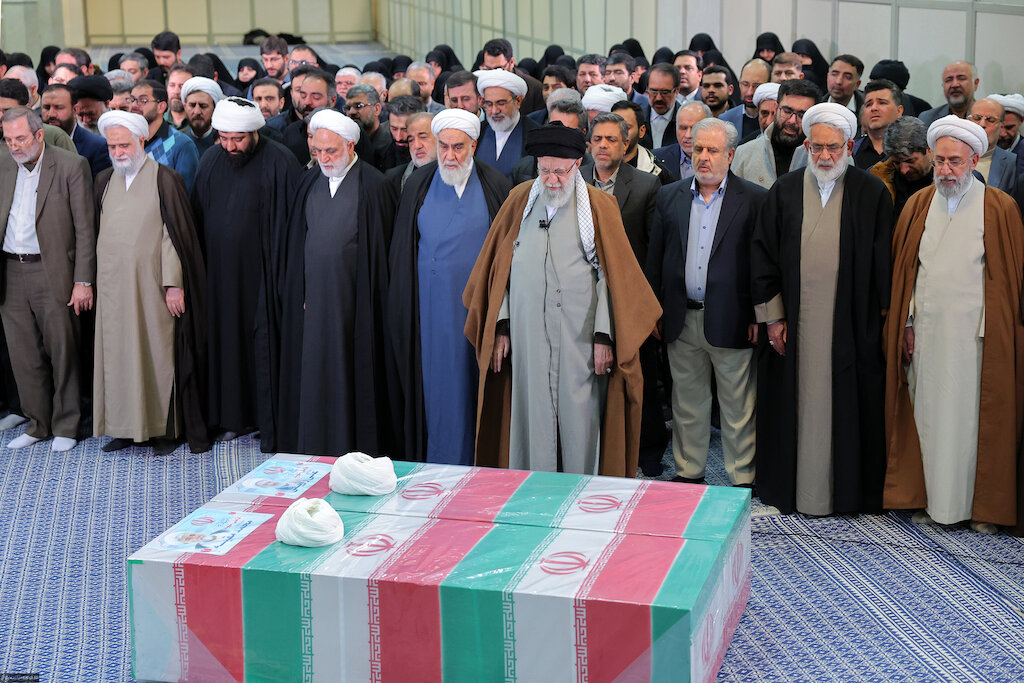
- The funeral with Supreme Leader of Iran Ali Khamenei (front row, center) in attendance
- Location: 35°40′54″N 51°25′08″E; Supreme Court of Iran, Tehran, Iran
- Date: 18 January 2025; 10:30 a.m. (IRST)
- Target: Judges
- Attack type: Mass shooting, assassination, murder–suicide, stabbing
- Weapons: Handgun, knife
- Deaths: 3 (including the perpetrator)
- Injuries: 1
- Victims: Ali Razini and Mohammad Moghiseh
- Perpetrator: Farshad Asadi
- Motive: Under investigation

On 18 January 2025, an attack took place at the Supreme Court of Iran, located inside the Palace of Justice in Tehran, Iran. Initial reports stated that the shooting occurred when a man armed with a knife entered, attacking a bodyguard before taking control of the bodyguard's handgun and opening fire. Two senior Qadi (Sharia judges), Ali Razini and Mohammad Moghiseh, died after being shot in their offices. A third judge survived his injuries.

The judges were reportedly adjudicating cases of student protesters, artists, intellectuals and activists in bench trials and had roles in the 1988 executions of Iranian political prisoners.

The perpetrator killed himself soon after the shooting, before he could be apprehended. No potential motive has been released.

== Background ==
According to Article 161 of the 1979 Constitution of Iran, the Supreme Court (Persian: دیوان عالی کشور, romanized: Divan-e 'Ali-ye Keshvar) is the highest judicial authority in the country, established for "the purpose of supervising the correct implementation of the laws by the courts, ensuring uniformity of judicial procedure, and fulfilling any other responsibilities assigned to it by law." Iran's legal system is based on Islamic law. According to Preamble 10, titled The Judiciary in the Constitution, jurists must operate "with meticulous knowledge of the Islamic laws." In 2005, judge Hassan Moghaddas was assassinated.

== Attack ==
The attack began when a man, armed with a knife, entered Branch 39 of the Supreme Court, located inside the Palace of Justice in Tehran and stabbed a bodyguard before taking his handgun. He then fired six shots, killing two senior judges. Early reports that three judges of the court had been targeted were denied by the Iranian government.

The assailant shot himself on the third floor of the building while apparently fleeing the scene.

The perpetrator was identified as 39-year-old Iranian citizen Farshad Asadi, who was born in 1986. Asadi worked at the Supreme Court for seven to eight years as a service worker and drink carrier. His motives are currently unknown, but it is known that the attack was premeditated and that Asadi did not get the salary increase he wanted. He is being investigated by authorities. In a media statement, the judiciary said that "preliminary investigations indicate that the perpetrator had no prior cases in the Supreme Court nor was he one of its visitors" and described the attack as a "premeditated assassination".

== Fatalities ==
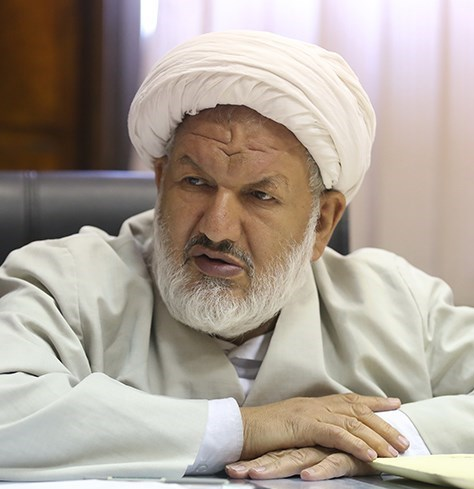
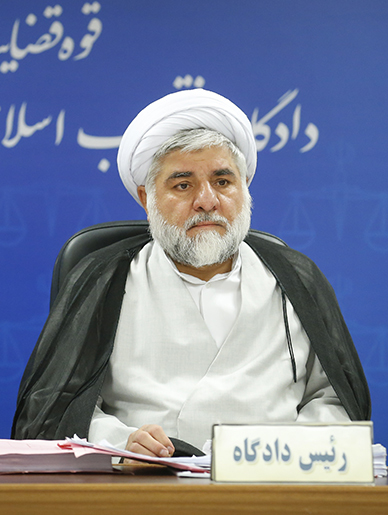
Ali Razini (left) and Mohammad Moghiseh (right).

=== Ali Razini ===
Ali Razini (Persian: علی رازینی; 23 May 1953 – 18 January 2025) was an Iranian judge and politician. He served in the Assembly of Experts from 2007 to 2016. Razini had been a target of an assassination attempt in 1998. At the time of his assassination, he was aged 71.

=== Mohammad Moghiseh ===
Mohammad Moghiseh (Persian: محمد مقیسه; 1956 – 18 January 2025) was an Iranian judge. He served on the Supreme Court of Iran from 2020 until his death. Moghiseh was the sentencing judge of Nasrin Sotoudeh and adjudicated the case of Hossein Rajabian. He was sanctioned in December 2019 by the United States Department of the Treasury's Office of Foreign Assets Control (OFAC) "pursuant to E.O. 13846 for engaging in censorship and other activities with respect to Iran on or after 12 July 2009 that prohibit, limit, or penalize the exercise of freedom of expression or assembly by citizens of Iran". He was also sanctioned by the European Union and Canada over alleged human rights abuses. At the time of his assassination, he was aged 68.

== Aftermath ==
In a message, Supreme Leader Ali Khamenei offered his condolences for the "martyrdom" of both judges. Khamenei also lauded them as Mujahid brothers. President Masoud Pezeshkian said the "terrorist and cowardly" act must be followed up quickly by security forces and law enforcement.

The Iranian judiciary spokesman Asghar Jahangir stated that the judges were working on "national security cases, including espionage and terrorism." According to the state-affiliated newspaper Tehran Times, several people working at the court building where the attack took place were detained.

Prosecutor-General Mohammad Jafar Montazeri described the killings as the "price" the Islamic Republic paid for its "survival". He stated that "capable young judges" would soon replace them.

== See also ==
- 2017 Tehran attacks
- 2023 attack on the Azerbaijani embassy in Tehran
- Assassination and terrorism in Iran
- List of terrorist incidents in 2025
