= Judicial system of the Islamic Republic of Iran =

One of the three forces in Islamic republic of Iran

Judicial System of the Islamic Republic Iran
- قوه قضاییه جمهوری اسلامی ایران
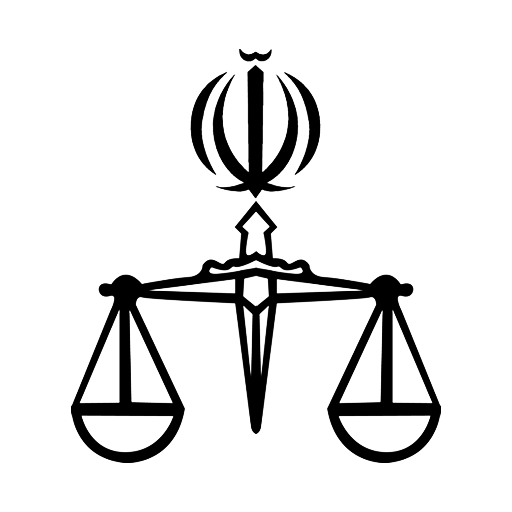
- Emblem of the Judicial System

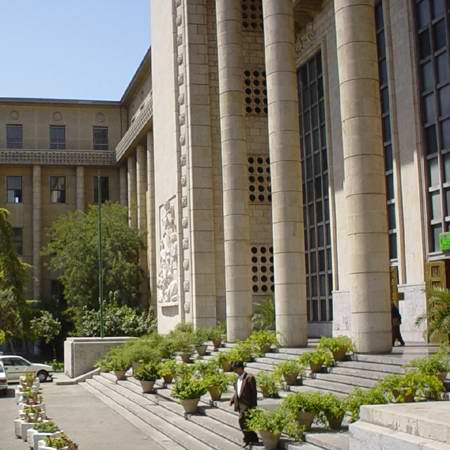
- Kakh-e Dadgostari
- Established: 1905
- Jurisdiction: Iran
- Location: Tehran, Iran
- Composition method: Supreme Leader selection
- Authorised by: Constitution of the Islamic Republic of Iran
- Judge term length: 5 years
- Website: https://eadl.ir/ (Persian)

Head of the Judiciary
- Currently: Gholam-Hossein Mohseni-Eje'i
- Since: 1 July 2021

Deputy Head of the Judiciary
- Currently: Hamzeh Khalili
- Since: 18 April 2024

The Islamic Republic of Iran was founded after the 1979 overthrow of the Pahlavi dynasty by the Islamic Revolution, and its legal code is based on Islamic law or sharia, although many aspects of civil law have been retained, and it is integrated into a civil law legal system. According to the constitution of the Islamic Republic, the judiciary in Iran "is an independent power". The entire legal system—"from the Supreme Court to regional courts, all the way down to local and revolutionary courts"—is under the purview of the Ministry of Justice, but in addition to a Minister of Justice and head of the Supreme Court, there is also a separate appointed Head of the Judiciary. Parliamentary bills pertaining to the constitution are vetted by the Council of Guardians.

The original nationwide judicial system in Iran was implemented and established by Abdolhossein Teymourtash under Reza Shah, with further changes during the second Pahlavi era.

== Structure of the judicial system ==
A map of incarceration rates by country

The 1979 Constitution of the Islamic Republic called for the judiciary to be "an independent power," and charges it with "investigating and passing judgement on grievances; ... supervising the proper enforcement of laws; ... uncovering crimes; prosecuting, punishing, and chastising criminals;" taking "suitable measures" to prevent crime and reform criminals.

The Head of the Judiciary, also known in English as 'Chief Justice of Iran', is to be a "just Mujtahid" appointed by the Supreme Leader and serve for "a period of five years." He is responsible for the "establishment of the organizational structure" of the judicial system; "drafting judiciary bills" for Parliament; hiring, firing, promoting, and assigning judges. Judges cannot be dismissed without a trial.

Judicial authority is constitutionally vested in the Supreme Court and the four-member High Council of the Judiciary, according to Hunt Janin and Andre Kahlmeyer.

According to Article 160 of the Constitution:

The Minister of Justice owes responsibility in all matters concerning the relationship between the judiciary, on the one hand, and the executive and legislative branches, on the other hand. ... The Head of the Judiciary may delegate full authority to the Minister of Justice in financial and administrative areas and for employment of personnel other than judges.

The Minister is to be chosen by the President from a list of candidates proposed by the Head of the Judiciary.
The Head of the Supreme Court and Prosecutor-General are also to be "just mujtahids" "nominated" by the Head of the Judiciary "in consultation with the judges of the Supreme Court" and serving for a period of five years.

== Court structure ==
According to Luiza Maria Gontowska, the Iranian court structure includes Revolutionary Courts, Public Courts, Courts of Peace and Supreme Courts of Cassation. There are 70 branches of the Revolutionary Courts. Public courts consist of Civil (205), Special Civil (99), First class criminal (86) and Second Class Criminal (156). Courts of Peace are divided into Ordinary courts (124), and Independent Courts of Peace (125), and Supreme Judicial Council of Iran (22).

=== Operation ===
The courts of the Islamic Republic are based on an inquisitorial system, such as exists in France, rather than an adversarial system as in the United Kingdom and the United States. The judge is the arbiter and decides on the verdict. In serious cases, he is assisted by two other secondary judges, and in cases involving the death penalty, four other secondary judges. There is also a public prosecutor. However, according to Article 168 of Iran's constitution, in certain cases involving the media, a jury is allowed to be the arbiter. The judge holds absolute power. In practice, judges may be overwhelmed by cases, and not have the time to consider each case carefully. All judges are certified in Islamic and Iranian law.

==== Clerical courts ====
The rulings of the Special Clerical Court, which functions independently of the regular judicial framework and is accountable only to the Supreme Leader, are also final and cannot be appealed through the normal appeals court system, but only through an internal appeals mechanism to which the ruling judge must agree. Princeton Professor Mirjam Künkler writes "It is not difficult to see how the SCC, given its legal status outside any accountable, transparent check by a governmental office other than the Office of the Supreme Leader, could transform into the Supreme Leaders’ primary instrument to discipline and prosecute dissident clerics." The Special Clerical Court handles crimes allegedly committed by clerics, although it has also taken on cases involving lay people.

==== Revolutionary courts ====
Islamic Revolutionary Courts that try certain categories of offenses, including crimes against national security, narcotics smuggling, and acts that are said to undermine the Islamic Republic.

Shortly after the overthrow of the monarchy, Revolutionary Tribunals were set up in the major towns, with two courts in the capital of Tehran - one each in the prison of Qasr and Evin, and one traveling tribunal for Hojjat al-Islam Sadegh Khalkhali, who was known for his stiff sentences (often execution). The courts presiding judges were clerics appointed by Khomeini himself. The decisions rendered by the Revolutionary courts initially were final and could not be appealed, and so bypassed what remained of the Justice Ministry and its appeal system. In 1989, a law was passed allowing an appeal to be made to the Supreme Court of Cassation. If the appeal was recognized, then the case would be given a retrial. Many Revolutionary Court judges today are not clerics however.

At least at first, the revolutionary courts differed from standard Western law courts by limiting trials to a few hours, sometimes minutes. Defendants could be found guilty on the basis of 'popular repute.' The concept of defense attorney was dismissed as a 'Western absurdity.' A charge that was widely applied against defendants but unfamiliar to some was 'sowing corruption on earth' (mofsed-e-filarz). This covered a variety of offenses - "'insulting Islam and the clergy,' 'opposing the Islamic Revolution,' 'supporting the Pahlavis,' and 'undermining Iran's independence' by helping the 1953 coup and giving capitulatory privileges to the imperial powers". Between 1979-1989, the Revolutionary Courts ordered the execution of at least 10,000 political prisoners, belonging to anti-revolutionary opposition groups, and sentenced others to death for crimes such as drug trafficking, adultery, sodomy, kidnapping, "disruption of the public order", and "terrorism". It is hard to know how many actual political prisoners were executed, because often of those executed for political crimes were also accused of "drug trafficking" or "sodomy".

In 1982, with continuous military coup threats, the Military Revolutionary Court was created.

By the 1990s, political executions became less common, but not unheard of, and by the 21st century are rare, carried out mainly in cases of "armed" or "riot-related" regime opposition. Belonging to an anti-regime "armed" opposition group is could also result in a death sentence. In recent years, the Revolutionary Courts operate more like normal courts, although they are still considered politically allied with the Supreme Leader rather than the regular, public courts which are neutral. Oftentimes, Revolutionary courts exist side by side with public courts. They also still try political and national security cases, as well as drug trafficking, smuggling, and "disturbance of the public order".

== Prison system ==
Iran's prison system was "centralized and drastically expanded" by the Islamic Republic. Under the Shah prisons had been administered separately by SAVAK, the urban police, and the gendarmerie. The new regime entrusted their management "to a supervisory council of three clerics".

In Tehran, all four prisons where political dissidents were kept were expanded. Evin was enlarged "with two new blocks containing six wards and six hundred solitary cells" so it could accommodate "an additional 6,000 inmates". Qezel Hesar was also expanded. Construction of the new Gohar Dasht prison had been started under the shah, it "was completed with hundreds of solitary cells and large wards housing more than 8,000 inmates".

Despite all this new capacity, Iran's prisons "were seriously overcrowded by 1983". Komiteh prison, built for 500, had 1,500 inmates; Evin Prison, built for 1,200, had 15,000; Qezel Hesar, built for 10,000, had 15,000; and Gohar Dasht prison, built for 8,000, had 16,000. Meanwhile, "Qasr, which had housed 1,500, in 1978, had more than 6,000".

At least for political prisoners prison life was considerably harsher in the Islamic Republic than under the Pahlavis according to those who had tasted both. "One who survived both writes that four months under [warden] Asadollah Ladjevardi took the toll of four years under SAVAK. Political prisoners were "incessantly bombarded with propaganda from all sides ... radio and closed-circuit television ... loudspeakers blaring into all cells even into solitary cells and 'the coffins' [where some prisoners were kept] ... ideological sessions." Any reading material of a secular nature such as Western novelists, or even religious material that didn't agree ideologically with the Islamic Republic such as work by Ali Shariati was banned. At least in Evin prison the Persian Nowruz celebration was banned. In the prison literature of the Pahlavi era, the recurring words had been 'boredom' and 'monotony.' In that of the Islamic Republic, they were 'fear', 'death', 'terror', 'horror,' and most frequent of all 'nightmare' (kabos)". By the 2000s prison life was considerably better, although torture was still carried out on political inmates (even allegedly criminals). But after the controversial 2009 elections, the situation for political prisoners has reportedly deteriorated.

Although classical Sharia law does not mention imprisonment, prisons are widely used in Iran. Typically, it would be given as a discretionary punishment from the civil code. In other cases, the defendant receives a sentence of exile, which would be carried out in a prison.

In 2005, with the prison capacity of 80,000, the actual number of prisoners was close to 160,000 people.
Statistics released in 2014 indicated that Iran then had 210,000 prisoners.
In June 2016, Iran has 228,000 prisoners, according to Iran's Minister of Justice Mostafa Pourmohammadi.

World Prison Brief provides statistics from 2018 that help size up the prisons in Iran. As of 2014, Iran had 253 prisons. As of 2018, 240,000 prisoners occupied those 253 prisons. The official occupancy level of the prisons in Iran is 150,000. Iran is currently 153% overcrowded. Out of every 100,000 people in Iran, 294 of them are incarcerated.

On 27 March 2020, Asghar Jahangir, head of Iran’s Prisons Organization, said that, because of the COVID-19 pandemic, more than 100,000 prisoners had been granted furloughs, around 40% of Iran’s estimated 240,000 prisoners.

== The legal profession ==
According to Banakar and Ziaee, the history of the Iranian Bar Association (Kānūn-e Vūkalā-yeh Dādgūstarī) “can be traced back to the period after the 1906 Constitutional Revolution, when a modern legal system was established in Iran. The IBA was founded in 1915 and organised under the supervision of the judicial system until 1953, when it was granted legal personality. It operated as an independent civil society organisation for the next twenty-seven years, until it was closed in 1980 by the revolutionary government and its ranks and files were purged. It was reopened in 1991 under the control of the Head of the Judiciary and regained some of its independence in 1997 when President Khatami […] won the general election. Since then, the numbers of lawyers have grown steadily to an estimated 60,000, and perhaps most significantly a large number of women have passed the Bar and joined the legal profession”. A new body of lawyers was created by the judiciary in 2001 and authorized to present cases in court under Article 187 of the Law of Third Economic, Social and Cultural Development Plan (adopted in May 2000). This group, whose membership in 2014 was estimated to exceed 20,000, is officially known as the Legal Advisors of the Judiciary. The Legal Advisors do not take the bar exam and are not organised by the bar. They need to seek re-accreditation by the judiciary every year, which, as Künkler has shown, undermines their political independence.

== Law ==
=== Compliance to sharia ===
Article 2 of the Iranian constitution states that the Islamic Republic of Iran "is a system based on belief in ... One God ... His exclusive sovereignty and the right to legislate". All laws enacted by Parliament must be based on Sharia, as the Guardian Council, composed of six faqihs, is required to verify their compliance with Sharia.

=== Banking ===
After the 1979 Islamic Revolution, all banks had to follow Sharia banking procedures, including the forbidding of interest (riba) and the forbidding of usury. The Supreme Audit Court of Iran regulates banking and financial operations. In recent years, Iran has created free trade zones, such as on Kish Island and the port of Chabahar where such rules are not applied in order to stimulate investment, similar to other Muslim countries. While the Islamic Republic has publicly and officially committed itself to interest-free economy and banking, "has decreed that government borrowing on the basis of a fixed rate of return from the nationalized banking system would not amount to interest and would hence be permissible."

=== Criminal law ===
After the election of the first Majles of the Islamic Republic, the Majles and the Guardian Council quickly codified important features of the sharia law by passing two landmark bills in July 1982:

- Qanon-e Ta'zir (Discretionary Punishment Law). Ta'zir laws dealt not only with criminal law but this law gave judges the authority to execute and imprison those found guilty of crimes such as 'declaring war on God' (equivalent to treason/terrorism) and 'plotting with foreign powers.' It also gave them the power to sentence offenders to as many as 74 lashes to those who "'insult government officials,' 'convene unlawful meetings,' sell alcoholic beverages, fix prices, hoard goods, kiss illicitly, fail to wear the proper hijab, and 'lie to the authorities.'"
- Qanon-e Qisas (Retribution Law) This law codified other aspects of the sharia. It subdivided crimes into hadd - those against God - and those against fellow beings, especially other families. Some punishments are mandatory; others, discretionary. "Based on the notion of lex talionis, the Qisas Law calls for 'an eye for an eye, a tooth for a tooth, a life for a life', unless the victim or his/her family forgive the perpetrator, and/or accept compensation for the death/injury (blood money).

In 1991–1994, Iran combined all of these laws into the unified "Islamic Penal Code" which consisted of five "Books". The new Islamic Penal Code was adopted in January 2012 and incorporates the bulk of penal laws in the IRI, replacing Books One through Four of the old code. Book Five of the Islamic Penal Code ("the only part of the Penal Code that has been adopted permanently and is not subject to experimental periods") passed on May 22, 1996. Book Five deals with ta'zir crimes and deterrent punishments, crimes against national security, crimes against property, against people, theft, fraud, forgery, insult and many other offenses.

=== Qisas ===
Qisas (the law of retaliation/retribution) is a sharia class of crime involving personal injury. It is similar to a civil law tort. If a person has intentionally murdered or maimed another person, the victim (or victim's family) is entitled to retribution (an "eye for an eye" in the case of personal injury or a life for a life in the case of murder). However, the victim (victim's family) can forgive the perpetrator and have the punishment not carried out. If so, the perpetrator must pay blood money (diyya) to compensate for the injury/death.

If the death was intentional murder (qatl-e-amd) or intentional injury (zarb-jahr amd), qisas can be applied. If the death was unintentional (manslaughter; qatl-e-na-amd) or unintentional injury (zarb-jahr na-amd), qisas cannot apply, but the person can receive up to three years in prison in order to pay the money. If an unborn child was killed, while considered intentional murder, the maximum punishment is one to three years in prison.

If the death/injury was unintentional, the perpetrator must pay diyya, he/she cannot receive qisas. The judge only convicts the perpetrator, he has no say in whether qisas will be applied or not (although he can try to influence the decision). It cannot be overturned upon appeal either unless the person is found not guilty on appeal. The age qisas is applied is 15 years of age, which has resulted in some controversy due to juvenile executions (that the authorities are powerless to stop). In 2012, the authorities said that qisas would not be applied anymore for youths under 18 years of age, except in rare cases. However, Iran uses the lunar Islamic calendar to determine criminal age, meaning some "eighteen-year olds" would actually still be seventeen years old.

If forgiven, the intentional murderer/injurer can also get a discretionary civil law sentences as well (such as 10 years imprisonment on a murder charge), if there were aggravating circumstances. All murderers must serve a minimum of 2–3 years in prison. Unintentional murderers cannot receive any additional punishment unless they also committed another crime, such as drinking. However, as a general rule, murder is considered to be more of a tort rather than an offense against the state.

Qisas is considered by Islamic scholars to be extremely fair and just. For example, in Western countries, the family of the victim has no say in the punishment that the perpetrator receives, yet in Islamic law, a murderer could be executed or forgiven depending upon the wishes of the family. In intentional qisas cases, the sentence would sometimes be delayed for five years in order to increase the chances of a settlement, and allow the criminal to amass the blood money.

Qisas cannot be applied in cases of self-defense, manslaughter, where the case lacks the proof requirements, on minors (age 15 for boys, 9 for girls prior to 2012, after 2012 aged 18 in most cases), on insane people, a person who murdered a spouse and/or their lover caught in the act of adultery, a father who murders his children, etc. Depending on the crime, they would be punished through a tazir discretionary sentence, ranging from no prison to 2 years in prison to life imprisonment. Sometimes the death penalty can be used if the person has been found guilty of "spreading corruption on the earth" or "moharebeh". Crimes of passion are not recognized as a legitimate defense, with the exception of the spouse caught in adultery. Self-defense and insanity is also narrowly defined. With the exception of manslaughter, and where proof requirements are lacking, none need to pay diyyeh either. If a murderer was working on the orders of another and he/she can prove it, they will receive a tazir punishment (imprisonment, fines and/or whipping, sometimes even death), while the person(s) who ordered the killing will suffer qisas/diyyeh.

One secular critic claimed the Qisas Law of Iran as discriminating against women, non-Muslims, and the poor; as reviving horrific physical punishments; and assuming parts of the human body can be converted into money. Qisas punishments "threatens to create an army of handicapped victims. And it 'paves the way for judicial torture' by permitting the use of confessions".

A qisas case that was said to have brought attention following publicity by Amnesty International, was a 2011 sentence of blinding by an Iranian court against a man who had blinded a woman in Tehran. In 2004, Majid Movahedi poured several liters of sulphric acid on the face of Ameneh Bahrami, blinding and severely disfiguring her, after she had spurned his proposals of marriage. Movahedi was tried in 2008 and found guilty, and for his sentence arrangements were made for Bahrami to inject "twenty drops of acid" into each of Movahedi's eyes while Movahedi was under anesthesia in a Tehran hospital. After appeals the punishment was set to be carried out on 14 May 2011, but has been postponed, and later Bahrami forgave Movahedi, thus sparing him the punishment.

=== Diyyeh (blood money) ===
In any case of personal injury, the victim's family may accept diyyeh, or blood money to compensate for the death/injury. The official rate that diyyeh is a price equal to 100 camels (this precedent was set by Muhammad). However, the blood money must be paid in cash only, not by bartering or any other means. While the victim's/victim's families have a right to retribution (qesas) when the crime is committed intentionally, they are recommended by the Qur'an and judges to forgive the defendant.

In practice, blood money is settled through negotiation between the two parties, and the final sum is usually more or less than the official "100 camels" amounts, unless both sides could not reach a settlement.

A woman receives 1/2 of the blood money a man does. However, in practice, since the blood money is settled through negotiation between the parties, normally women receive equal amounts as men, and in 2008, the law was changed allowing women equal amounts of diyyeh in cases involving insurance and life-insurance.

An unborn child in the first period of pregnancy will receive 1/20 of regular diyyeh, and in the second period, 1/10 of regular diyyeh.

In an intentional case, the money must be paid at once, and the person must remain in prison until the money is paid. In unintentional cases, the blood money can be paid over a period of 1–3 years, it the person fails to generate the money, they will go to debtor's prison until it is paid. The family of the murderer/injurerer is expected to help pay the blood money. In other cases, the government will subsidize it, or private charities/citizens will help pay.

In rape/sodomy rape cases, the rapist must pay "jirah", which is similar to blood money, but equivalent to a woman's dowry (mahr), usually in exchange for forgiveness. In addition, they may be forced to also pay diyyeh as well, for injuries inflicted during the rape.

=== Hadd crimes ===
Iran uses the Shia based Jaafari school of Islamic jurisprudence. Some of the Hudud (Hadd is the singular) punishments differ from other countries, such as Saudi Arabia. Some of these laws are part of Iran's penal code, while others are uncodified. These laws are more the maximum limits for sentencing and are rarely applied, but in serious cases they can be applied. All of these crimes have civil/tazir code punishments, but in serious cases, hadd punishments would be carried out.

Hadd crimes are considered to be "claims against God", and they are punishable by a mandatory, fixed sentence that was laid down in the Koran and Hadith. They are very rarely applied in practice, because they require a high standard of proof and if the person is repentant or if there is any reasonable doubt, it may not be carried out. Two witnesses or a confession are required for a conviction. For sexual crimes, 4 witnesses are required.. Others forms of evidence (such as video evidence) are admitted for hadd punishment, except in cases of consensual sexual crimes. They are:

- Waging war against God (moharebeh) and spreading corruption in Earth (mofsede-fel-arz): judge has option of 1) death penalty; 2) crucifixion for three days; 3) amputation of right hand and left foot; 4) exile/imprisonment

This crime is for somebody who used a weapon to strike fear and spread disorder, for example through armed robbery, kidnapping, terrorism/violent armed crimes, rape, and gang violence. This charge has been used in Iran as a political charge/treason/disrupting stability of Islamic Republic, and belonging to anti-regime opposition groups. Mitigating factors are repentance and lack of success of the crime. People are generally only convicted of moharebeh and executed if they had murdered somebody (at any point in their lives), or they committed serious acts against the state and society (such as repeatedly attempting the murder of police). It can also be applied for treason, espionage, "terrorism", and "acts against the state".

- Theft (sirqhat-e-haddi): 1st offense, amputation of the 4 right fingers; 2nd offense, amputation of the 5 left toes; 3rd offense, life imprisonment; 4th offense, death penalty. There are numerous mitigating factors, such as poverty, repentance, failure, if it was public property, if it was not in a secure place inside of a house/store, and such. As a general rule, Iranian judicial authorities do not carry out amputation. In Iran, amputation as punishment was described as "uncommon" in 2010, but in 2014 there were three sentences of hand amputation, and one of eye gouging in 2015. Fingers, but not the complete hand, were amputated as punishment four times in 2012-13.
- Apostasy (irtaad): officially not a crime in Iran, but still punished because it is inspired by religious texts in serious cases. Death penalty for men, life imprisonment for women. (If person had converted and then became apostate, three days are given to repent, otherwise execution carried out).
- Blasphemy (sabb-al-nabi): death penalty or imprisonment
- Adultery (zina): Unmarried (fornication), 100 lashes, death penalty by stoning for married couples. Mitigating Factor: repentance, lack of evidence, marrying partner, temporary marriage in some cases.
- Married: death penalty by stoning. Mitigating factor: repentance, lack of evidence, forgiveness by spouse, (in practice if partner did not die, no death penalty given) It would normally would be reduced to 99 lashes discretionary punishment
- Rape: death penalty for rapist (4 witnesses not needed in most cases). Mitigating factor: repentance, forgiveness of victim, paying compensation "jirah" to victim, lack of evidence
- Sodomy (lavat): Rape, death penalty for rapist; Consensual; 100 lashes for active partner, death penalty for passive partner unless repentant (prior to 2012, it was death penalty for both). Mitigating factor: repentance, lack of evidence, (see adultery's mitigating factors)
- Takhfiz (non-penetrative homosexuality): 100 lashes; 4th offense, death penalty. Mitigating Factor: repentance, lack of evidence
- Lesbianism (mosahegheh): 100 lashes; death on 4th offense Mitigating factors: repentance, lack of evidence
- Procuring of prostitute (ghavvadi): 100 lashes; 4th offense, death penalty. If widespread prostitution rings were run, person could be sentenced to death as a "corrupter of the earth". Mitigating factor: repentance, lack of evidence
- False accusation of sexual crimes (ghazf): 80 lashes; 4th offense, death penalty. Mitigating factors: forgiveness of the falsely accused person.
- Consumption of alcohol (shurb-e-khamr): 80 lashes; 4th offense death penalty (prior to 2008, 3rd offense) This also applies to drug users. Mitigating factors: repentance, lack of evidence, promising to receive treatment for addiction

These sentences are not commonly implemented (at least in full) due to the high burden of proof and the emphasis on repentance and forgiveness required. Most criminals thus receive a lesser conviction, through the tazir code.

=== Tazir (deterrent crimes) ===
A tazir crime is a crime in Sharia law that receives a discretionary sentence by a judge. The "vast majority" of offences in the Iranian judiciary system "are related to Ta’zirat crimes," and their rules under Islamic criminal law are more flexible than with Hudud, Qisas and Diyat punishments. A deterrent crime is a tazir crime that has a punishment in Iran's Penal Code (mostly based on pre-Revolutionary French civil law). These crimes are divided into felonies, misdemeanors, and contraventions. All criminal acts have a civil code penalty in Iran, and are usually punished as such.

A judge can also give a sentence of up to 74 lashes for an individual crime (and possibly more if multiple crimes were committed at once), and up to 99 for sexual crimes. Imprisonment, fines, and other penalties can be implemented (the maximum being life imprisonment, usually for recidivists and serious criminals). The law is variable, and the judge decides depending upon each individual case. The vast majority of criminal cases in Iran are punished as "tazir", and generally they receive a lesser punishment than a hadd crime.

Tazir crimes are considered "claims of the state", so criminals will generally receive a tazir punishment even if they avoided qisas or hadd.

Examples: 1) A thief was not given the hadd punishment for theft (amputation of right fingers). He receives the tazir punishment for theft instead (1 year in prison at a minimum, and maximum of 74 lashes).

2) A rapist was forgiven by his rape victim, avoids death but given tazir punishment of 99 lashes, and an additional 8 years in prison.

3) An adulterer was repentant, and was given tazir punishment (99 lashes, 1 year in prison)

4) A drug addict avoided the hadd punishment of 80 lashes because he was addicted to the drug, and he promised to enter a drug rehabilitation program.

Civil crimes such as hoolganism (ashrar), aggravated assault (sherarat), rape (tajavoz-be-onf), armed robbery (serghat) receive prison sentences. In some cases, where the crime is so severe that it is tanatmount to the hadd crime committed (such as moharebeh), the person can even receive the death penalty on the basis of that hadd crime.

If a person commits serious crimes "against the state", such as espionage, treason, activism, "terrorism", and such, they could receive the death penalty for "moharebeh" and "mofsede-fel-arz". Large scale economic crimes can also be punishable by death for "mofsed-fel-arz" if the stability of the financial system was threatened.

Iran's Anti-Narcotics Law specifies that a person who commits the following drug offenses would be sentenced to death. (typically applied on the second or third offense, and even then some are given life imprisonment) -Possession of 30 grams of heroin/cocaine/methamphetamine/morphine/LSD. The death penalty is commuted for first-time offenders if the amount is less than 100 grams and the criminal did not make a sale. -Possession of 5000 grams/5 kilograms of opium/marijuana/cannabis/prescription drugs/industrial chemical drugs/hemp juice. The death penalty is commuted for first-time offenders when the amount is less than 20000 grams/20 kilograms and the criminal did not make a sale. -Armed smuggling of any narcotics, or being part of or the head of a narcotics smuggling gang (normally would receive a prison sentence prior to execution).

Usually the first offense would be imprisonment, but the second or third offense would be death. The death penalty would be applied if the crimes are deemed to be at the level of "mofsed-fel-arz" (see definition for moharebeh/mofsed-fel-arz).

Iran has been noted for a progressive policy in the treating of drug users (see harm reduction). These include needle exchange programs and methadone treatments as a way of reducing the drug problem. Drug addicts are usually not prosecuted if they enter into one of these programs, with the goal being weaning people off the drugs. However, drug dealers are dealt with severely long prison sentences, corporal punishment, and even the death penalty in some cases. Iran currently is one of the most addicted countries in the world, with over 1.5-3.5 million addicts out of 75 million people.

== Criticism and human rights issues ==
In a 2013 poll by Pew Research Center, while 83% of Iranians favored the use of Islamic law, only 37% of Iranians believed that Iran's legal system closely follows Islamic law.

=== Death penalty ===
During the early, more tumultuous years of the Islamic Republic, a great number of political prisoners were executed. In 1979, more than 800 people were executed. Between 1981 and 1985, 7,900 people were executed. In 1988, a mass execution of political prisoners was carried out, with estimates that between 4,500 and 5,000 prisoners were executed. The overwhelming majority of those executed (90%) were political prisoners, although many executions were carried out under the auspices of crimes such as "drug trafficking", "terrorism", or "sodomy".

Like 74 other countries in the world, Iran carries out capital punishment. As a State party to the International Convention on Civil and Political Rights (ICCPR) and the Convention on the Rights of the Child (CRC), Iran has undertaken not to execute anyone for an offence committed when they were under the age of 18, but continues to carry such executions out, and is one of only six nations in the world to do so. According to Article 6 of the ICCPR, "Sentence of death shall not be imposed for crimes committed by persons below eighteen years of age."

The legal methods of execution are hanging, firing squad, stoning, beheading, and throwing from a height. However, in practice only hanging is approved by the authorities (firing squads were used for many military/political crimes up to the 1990s). There are few records of beheading or throwing executions. Stoning was used rarely, but has been in practice removed as a punishment in recent years. In 2012, the penal code was amended to officially remove stoning as a punishment (although it could still technically be applied in unspecified circumstances). If the crime was serious, the execution could be carried out in public at the scene of the crime.

The Judiciary does not recognize the concept of sexual orientation, and thus from a legal standpoint there are no homosexuals or bisexuals - only heterosexuals "committing" homosexual acts.

From the beginning of the revolution until the mid-1980s transgender individuals were classified by the Judiciary as homosexual and thus subject to the same laws. The Judiciary began changing this policy and now classifies them as a distinct group with legal rights. Gender dysphoria is officially recognized in Iran today, and the Judiciary permits sexual reassignment surgery for those who can afford it. In the early 1960s, Ayatollah Khomeini had issued a ruling permitting gender reassignment, which has since been reconfirmed by Ayatollah Khamenei.

On 19 July 2005 two teenagers, Mahmoud Asgari and Ayaz Marhoni, aged 16 and 18, were publicly executed by hanging in Edalat (Justice) Square in the city of Mashhad. They had been convicted of sodomizing and raping a 13-year-old boy in 2004, and other charges included alcohol consumption, theft, and disturbing the peace. They were detained for 14 months in prison awaiting execution and sentenced to 228 lashes. Iranian officials complained that foreign and domestic media emphasized that the two were mere boys: "Instead of paying tribute to the action of the judiciary, the media are mentioning the age of the hanged criminals and creating a commotion that harms the interests of the state".

=== Gender inequality ===
One complaint that critics have of Iran's legal system (and sharia law in general) is that men receive twice as much blood money (diyyeh) as women do. While that is true in some circumstances, diyyeh is almost always negotiated between the victim (or his/her family) and the perpetrator's family. As a result, generally the amount of diyyeh given is different than the "official" amount, and in practice women receive equal blood money. In 2008, Iran officially made diyyeh equal in insurance cases.

Human rights activist and Nobel Prize winner Shirin Ebadi complains that the section of the penal code "devoted to blood money, diyyeh, holds that if a man suffers an injury that damages his testicles, he is entitled to compensation equal to a women's life," and this failure to make account for individual differences or cases is unfair. It means, according to Ebadi, that "if a professional woman with a PhD is run over in the street and killed, and an illiterate thug gets one of the testicles injured in a fight, the value of her life and his damaged testicle are equal." While this is not always accurate, she does point out a shortcoming of the system. However, in practice women receive equal amounts of blood money to men through negotiation.

Ebadi has also protested that while "the Islamic Revolution had anointed the Muslim family the centerpiece of its ideology of nation" and envisions a "restoration of traditional and authentic values" through women playing the role of "Muslim mother" staying home to care for "her multiplying brood," at the same time its family law automatically grants fathers custody "in the event of divorce," and makes "polygamy as convenient as a second mortgage." However, polygamy is rare in Iran, it must receive a court order, and the husband must "treat all of his wives equally" otherwise he could face divorce. In a divorce, if a father is deemed unfit, custody is given to the mother. Prior to the age of 7, children are also always given custody with the mother, and when they are older, they can choose to live with either parent.

=== Apostasy ===
While not officially a crime in Iran, in some cases people can be prosecuted for apostasy. Punishment is death for men and life imprisonment for women. It has been used for political crimes as well.

In November 2002, Hashem Aghajari, a university professor and veteran of the Iran–Iraq War, was convicted of apostasy and sentenced to death after making a speech telling Iranians not to "blindly follow" clerics. But after a storm of protests from the general populace, reformist politicians, and human rights advocates, the sentence was later commuted to three years imprisonment, and Aghajari was paroled within months. Apostasy convictions are sometimes meted out not only for openly renouncing the religion of one's birth, but also for criticizing clerical rule (as in the case of Aghajari), defaming Islam, conversion from Islam, attempting to lead others away from Islam, among other reasons. As such, the legal definition of apostasy is subject to the individual interpretation of the judge. The traditional definition of apostasy only applies to those who are born into one of the legally recognized religions - Islam, Judaism, Christianity, and Zoroastrianism. The Baháʼí Faith, for example, is not legally recognized, and the adherents of that religion are considered apostate by virtue. Also see religious minorities in Iran.

=== Reform ===
Many Iranians argue for necessary reform in the judicial system, primarily in the prison system (such as beatings and torture) and political prisoners.

Reformist politicians have made attempts in the past to challenge the death penalty, as well as to enforce the rule of law concerning the illegal use of torture in prisons. Journalists and human rights advocates in Iran who attempt to raise awareness of these issues often risk imprisonment and the death sentence themselves, such as in the case of Akbar Ganji. On 18 December 2003, President Mohammad Khatami stated, "I don't like the death penalty, although if there is one case where there should be an execution, the fairest case would be for Saddam. But I would never wish for that."

Due to the power and scope of the institutions of velayat-e-faqih (Guardianship of the Clergy), which includes the Council of Guardians and the Office of the Supreme Leader, as well as the Judiciary, elected institutions such as the Majlis and the Office of the President are often unable to challenge laws because they are constitutional.

== Heads ==
The Chief Justice of the Islamic Republic of Iran is appointed by the Supreme Leader of Iran.

== See also ==
- Blasphemy law in Iran
- Censorship in Iran
- Constitution of the Islamic Republic of Iran
- Corruption in Iran
- Crime in Iran
- Human rights in Iran
- Intellectual property in Iran
- Iran Tribunal
- Iran's Family Protection Law
- Iranian Cyber Police
- Iranian labor law
- Iranian nationality law
- Law Enforcement Forces of Islamic Republic of Iran
- List of economic laws in Iran
- List of national legal systems
- Parading on donkey
- Political repression in the Islamic Republic of Iran
- Special Clerical Court
- Taxation in Iran
- Traffic police of Iran
