= Hadi Jelveh =

Iranian Supreme Court judge

- هادی جلوه
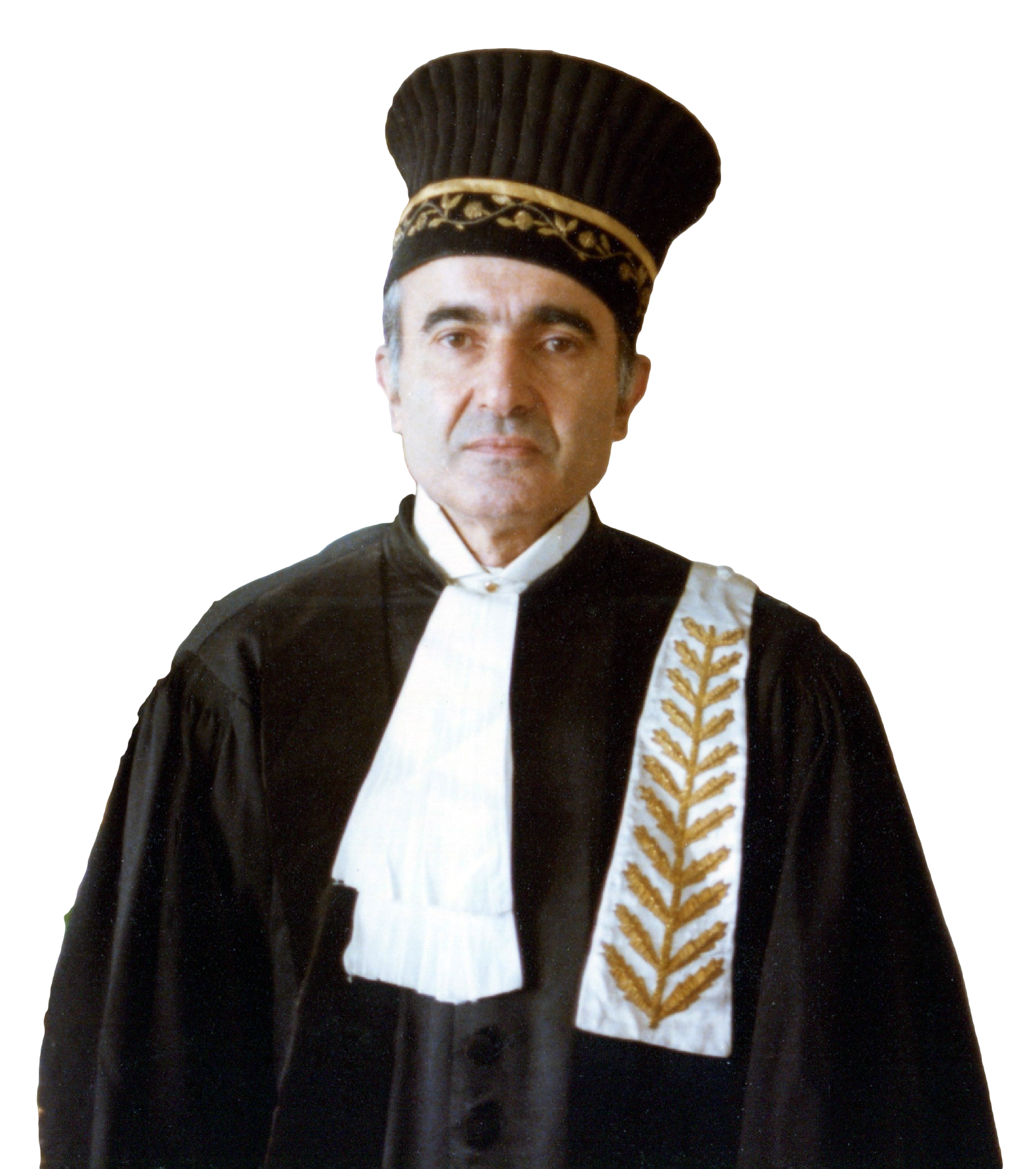
- Justice Hadi Jelveh in official "Salam" Robe

Associate Justice of the Supreme Court of Iran (1977)
- Appointed by: Mohammad Reza Pahlavi

Personal details
- Born: Hadi Jelveh; March 21, 1919 Rasht, Guilan, Qajar Iran (now Iran)
- Died: December 8, 2011 (aged 92) Vancouver, British Columbia, Canada
- Spouse: Manijeh Samii (m. 1933–2011; his death)
- Children: 6
- Education: Sorbonne Law School, University of Tehran

Hadi Jelveh (French: Hadi Djelveh, Persian: هادی جلوه; [hɒ'di dʒel'vehː]; 21 March 1919 – 8 December 2011) was an Iranian lawyer and judge for the Supreme Court of Iran. In his late life he lived in Vancouver, Canada.

== Early life ==
He was born in 1919 (or 1298 Solar Hijri calendar) in Rasht in the province of Guilan, Qajar Iran (now Iran), to Nosrat Poordavoodi and Mohammad Reza Jelveh, a prominent lawyer who also represented royalty in Iran. His father died when he was age 17. He completed his secondary studies at Shahpour High School in Rasht, where he received awards for his academic achievements. He had full command of Persian, French and Arabic languages.

Later he moved to Tehran and completed his law degree at the University of Tehran.

== Career ==
After graduation, he returned to Rasht and served as an assistant prosecutor, working his way up to become a prosecutor and then a judge.

Later he became the head of the Ministry of Justice for city of Lahijan, Guilan. During his tenure, as a judge in Guilan, he presided over many challenging cases.

In one case, he defended farmers against a powerful family in Rasht. He was asked to dismiss the complaints by many peers for the fear that it would cost him his job, but he refused. As a result, he was reassigned to work as a Judge in Shiraz, Fars, but refused to comply. After 7 months of efforts to regain his post, he wrote a letter to the Shah of Iran, Reza Shah Pahlavi, complaining about the treatment he had received. Within 48 hours a decree was issued by the Shah that he should be reinstated in Rasht. His reinstatement made him an instant celebrity, as someone who had fought to protect the rights of the underprivileged.

While on the bench, he challenged prosecutors to send him cases involving real criminals, (drug traffickers rather than drug users). He believed resources of the justice system would be better utilized in handling the source of the problems and not its symptoms.

He later became head of the Justice department office in the province of Esfahan for 8 months and later in Shiraz for 1 year. He later returned to Tehran and became associate justice at Divan-eh-Kay-far.

=== France and Italy ===
In 1963, took an unpaid leave of absence from the bench and traveled to Paris to continue his law studies. He enrolled in the doctorate program at the University of Sorbonne, where he met with Dr. Pascuali (at the coroner's office) who put him in contact with Professor Fillipo Gramatica, an Italian legal scholar who had worked on the topic of social defense and had written the constitution for the Republic of San Marino. Hadi sent a copy of his research on Social Defense. Jelveh met with him in Italy where Gramatica encouraged him to continue his work on Social Defense. He met Professor Giacello Canepa a scholar in criminology from the University of Genoa. While in Europe, he worked for UNESCO reporting on the conditions of prisons in several European cities. In 1967, he was awarded a doctorate in Criminology from the University of Sorbonne. While abroad, he mastered the French language. His thesis was published in the journal Revue internationale de droit comparé and Revue de science criminelle et de droit pénal comparé.

=== Iran ===
He returned to Iran from France to become the first head of the bureau of crime statistics (daftar Motaleat and barrasyhaya vazarat dadghostai) at the Ministry of Justice. Later, he became "Dadyar Divan Keshvar" (Assistant Solicitor General) of Iran.

He continued to work his way up the judiciary hierarchy in the capital city from an assistant district attorney to presiding judge of the 12th circuit court in Tehran, and later as presiding judge of the higher criminal court branch 6. While working in Tehran, he presided over many high-profile criminal and civil cases involving foreign nationals. His final position was Associate Justice of the Supreme Court. He was awarded the Iranian Bar Association blind justice statue award during his tenure at the justice department.

In 1977, he was approached to serve as the governor of Province of Shiraz, Iran, but respectfully declined.

After the 1977 Islamic Revolution, Chief Justice of Iran, Mohammad Beheshti asked him to remain at his post. However, he had already decided to step down and establish a private law practice. He represented several banks such as Bank-e-Tejarat (Tejarat Bank).

He taught law at the National Police Academy in Tehran, Khom School of Law (Qom) and University of Meli. As a lawyer, he represented clients who had legal as well as moral standing. He conducted thorough investigations to ensure that his clients were truthful before he accepted their cases. He worked pro bono on many cases, since many of his clients did not have the money to pay him.

Jelveh was asked to return to work for the justice department by Mahmoud Hashemi Shahroudi, but respectfully declined.

== Publications ==
While practicing law, Jelveh worked on several publications.

- Defence Sociale (English: Social Defense) 1st and 2nd edition.
- Divan-eh Hakim Sabouri (Persian: حکیم صبوری)
- Eghlim-E-Eshgh (Persian: اقلیم عشق)
- Danesh Guilani

His works were cited in legal publications such as:

- Human Rights and The Legal System In Iran, Two Reports by William J. Butler, Esq. and Professor Georges Levasseur. International Commission of Jurists. Geneva, Switzerland. March, 1976
- Quelques réflexions sur prévention et répression d'après l'expérience des cours d'assises françaises, belges et italiennes, Publisher: Sirey, Paris, 1973 Language: French. Biblioteca da Procuradoria Geral da República

== Personal life ==
In 1951, he married Manijeh Sonia Samii (Rasht, Guilan, Iran) and had their first of six children in 1952.

He eventually closed his practice and retired in Vancouver, British Columbia, Canada where he continued his research on various legal topics. He died on December 8, 2011, in North Vancouver, British Columbia, Canada. He left behind his wife, 6 children and 7 grandchildren.
