= Mohammad Movahedi Azad =

Iranian cleric (born 1960)

Mohammad Movahedi-Azad
- محمد موحدی آزاد
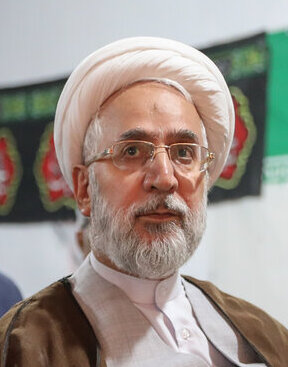
- Movahedi-Azad in September 2023

Prosecutor-General of Iran
- Incumbent
- Assumed office 6 August 2023
- Appointed by: Gholam-Hossein Mohseni-Eje'i
- Preceded by: Mohammad Jafar Montazeri

Chief of the Supreme Council of Justice
- In office 29 November 2022 – 21 August 2023
- Appointed by: Gholam-Hossein Mohseni-Eje'i
- Preceded by: Nabiullah Davoudi Mazandarani
- Succeeded by: Hossein Ali Nayiri

Personal details
- Born: 6 September 1960 (age 65) Qom, Iran

Mohammad Movahedi-Azad (Persian: محمد موحدی آزاد; born 6 September 1960) is an Iranian cleric and judge, currently serving as the country's Prosecutor-General. During the 2025–2026 Iranian protests, he played a prominent role, labeling protesters "enemies of God" and saying that "the provocateurs will be tried and punished in accordance with all legal procedures." In January 2026, the European Union proposed sanctions against Azad for threatening protesters with death sentences.

== Biography ==
Mohavedi-Azad was born in Qom and began his career in law shortly after the Iranian Revolution, working for the Tehran Province Prosecutor's office. He ascended gradually as a prosecutor and reached the highest position within the Tehran Court of Appeals and the Tehran Islamic Revolutionary Court. Before becoming Prosecutor-General, Mohavedi-Azad served as the chief of the High Disciplinary Court of Judges, a judicial body which investigates legal conduct among judges and the courts.

In 2009, he led the prosecution of protesters of that year's presidential election, which resulted in harsh sentences against many of them. In March 2011, an appeals court reduced the sentences of seven Bahá'í leaders (the Baháʼí 7 case) from 20 to 10 years in prison; Mohavedi-Azad, however, reversed the decision and reimposed the previous punishment. He has been accused of persecuting minorities, including Baháʼís, and of upholding sentences for dress code violations by women arrested by morality police.

Movahedi-Azad assumed office as Prosecutor-General on 6 August 2023, succeeding Mohammad Jafar Montazeri. He took a prominent role during the 2025–2026 Iranian protests, calling protesters "enemies of God" and promising to seek the death penalty against those arrested under the charge of moharebeh (waging war against God).
