= Ali Orumian =

Iranian Ayatollah (1932–2024)

Ayatollah Sheikh Ali Orumian
- علی ارومیان
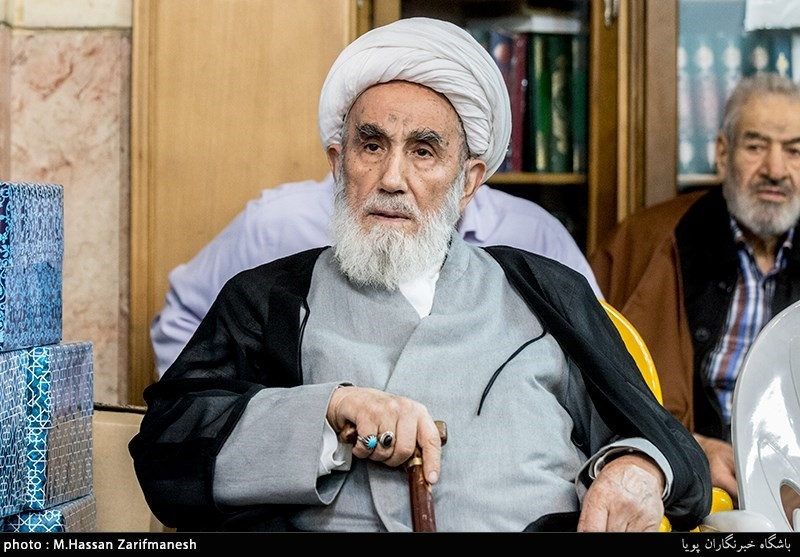
- Orumian in 2018

Member of Second, and Third terms of the Assembly of Experts.
- In office 8 October 1990 – 15 December 2006
- Preceded by: Abdol Hossein Tabrizi Gharavi
- Succeeded by: Mohammad Feyz Sarabi
- Constituency: East Azerbaijan Province

Member of the Second term of Islamic Consultative Assembly.
- In office 15 April 1984 – 8 April 1988
- Constituency: East Azerbaijan Province
Ali Orumian
- علی ارومیان
- Title: Ayatollah
Personal life
- Born: 1932 Maragheh, East Azerbaijan Province, Imperial State of Persia
- Died: 23 January 2024 (aged 92)
- Children: Mehdi Orumian; Reza (Abdul Hamid) Orumian; Mohsen Orumian; Mahdi Orumian
- Education: Qom Hawza; Hawza Najaf
Religious life
- Religion: Islam
- Jurisprudence: Twelver Shia Islam
Muslim leader
- Teacher: Seyed Mahmoud Hosseini Shahroudi; Abu al-Qasim al-Khoei; Muhsin al-Hakim; Abdullah Musawi Shirazi; Ruhollah Khomeini

Sheikh Ali Orumian (Persian: شیخ علی ارومیان; 1932 – 23 January 2024) was an Iranian Ayatollah. He served in the Second and Third terms of the Assembly of Experts, as well as the second term for the Islamic Consultative Assembly representing East Azerbaijan Province.

== Biography ==
Ali Orumian was born to a family in Maragheh in 1932. Through his early years he was learning the Quran as well as his usual lessons in school. It was until he was in High School that he decided to attend the Maragheh Theological School where he was taught by Sheikh Aziz Adib. He then travelled to Qom to attend the Qom Seminary to further his Islamic knowledge. In Qom, he was taught by Mirza Muslim Malakouti. After spending some time in Qom, he decided to migrate to Najaf and continue his Islamic education in Hawza Najaf where he would spend most of his learning years in regards to Islamic jurisprudence. While in Najaf, he was taught by Abu al-Qasim al-Khoei, Muhsin al-Hakim, Abdullah Musawi Shirazi, and Mahmoud Shahroudi as well as Ruhollah Khomeini. However, he became very close to Ayatollah Shirazi and Ayatollah Khoei while in studying Najaf, and would attend their lectures quite frequently. He even wrote summaries of their lectures which he published in Najaf After spending 19 years in Najaf, he decided to return to Maragheh in 1973. During the ongoing politically charged climate in Iran, he gave Khutbahs (Islamic Sermons) on the Minbar (pulpit) about the Pahlavi regime which lead to him being sent to the police station for interrogation by SAVAK, and the eventual banning from giving lectures on the pulpit until the 1979 Iranian revolution.

After the revolution he served two terms in the Assembly of Experts as well as serving the second term of the Islamic Consultative Assembly. Three of his sons, Mehdi, Reza, and Mohsen died in combat during the Iran–Iraq War. His fourth son was badly injured during Operation Kheibar in Majnoon Island.

Orumian died from cardiac arrest on 23 January 2024, at the age of 92.

== Works ==
- Tanqih al-Usool (Kitab al-Istishab)
- Lectures of Ayatollah Shirazi
- Lectures of Ayatollah Khoei
- Philosophy of Fasting
- Discussions in Jurisprudence of Ayatollah Shirazi
- A Treatise of Friday Prayers

== See also ==
- List of members in the Second Term of the Council of Experts
- List of members in the Third Term of the Council of Experts
- List of ayatollahs
- Abdullah Musawi Shirazi
- Karamatollah Malek-Hosseini
