= Abdul-Nabi Namazi =

Iranian ayatollah (1948–2024)

Ayatollah Abdul-Nabi Namazi
- عبدالنبی نمازی
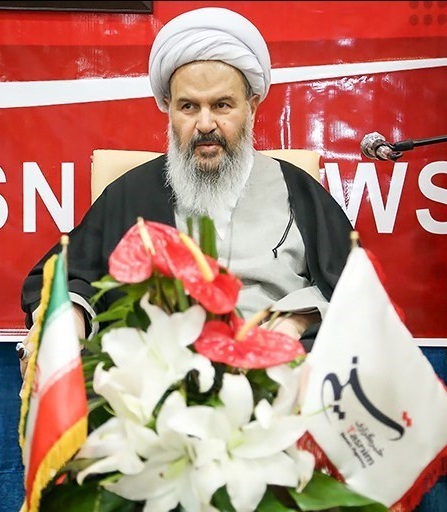
- Namazi in 2016

Member of the Assembly of Experts
- In office 21 February 1991 – 20 February 2007
- Constituency: Bushehr province
- In office 20 February 2007 – 24 May 2016
- Constituency: Tehran province
- In office 24 May 2016 – 28 January 2024
- Constituency: Isfahan province

Prosecutor-General of Iran
- In office 2001–2004
- Appointed by: Mahmoud Hashemi Shahroudi
- Preceded by: Morteza Moghtadai
- Succeeded by: Ghorbanali Dorri-Najafabadi

Personal details
- Born: Abdolnabi Namazi; 1948 Dashti County, Bushehr, Iran
- Died: 28 January 2024 (aged 75–76)
- Known for: Ayatollah and politician

Abdul Nabi Namazi (Persian: عبدالنبی نمازی; 1948 – 28 January 2024) was an Iranian Twelver Shia cleric and politician. He was a member of the 2nd and 3rd Assembly of Experts of the Islamic Republic of Iran, from Bushehr province. He was re-elected for the 4th and 5th Assemblies, from Tehran province and Isfahan province respectively.

== Biography ==
Born in 1948, Namazi was the prosecutor-general for the judiciary of the Islamic Republic and received some notoriety in 2002 when he was criticized by the conservative newspaper Jumhuri Eslami, for "flagrantly" ignoring Supreme Leaders Ali Khamenei's order to review a death sentence handed down to Hashem Aghajari for apostasy for a speech he gave on Islam urging Iranians to "not blindly follow" Islamic clerics.

Namazi died on 28 January 2024.

== See also ==
- 2006 Iranian Assembly of Experts election
- List of ayatollahs
- Prosecutor-General of Iran
- List of members in the Second Term of the Council of Experts
- List of members in the Third Term of the Council of Experts
- List of members in the Fourth Term of the Council of Experts
- List of members in the Fifth Term of the Council of Experts
