= Morteza Moghtadai =

Iranian Ayatollah

Ayatollah Morteza Moghtadaei
- مرتضی مقتدایی
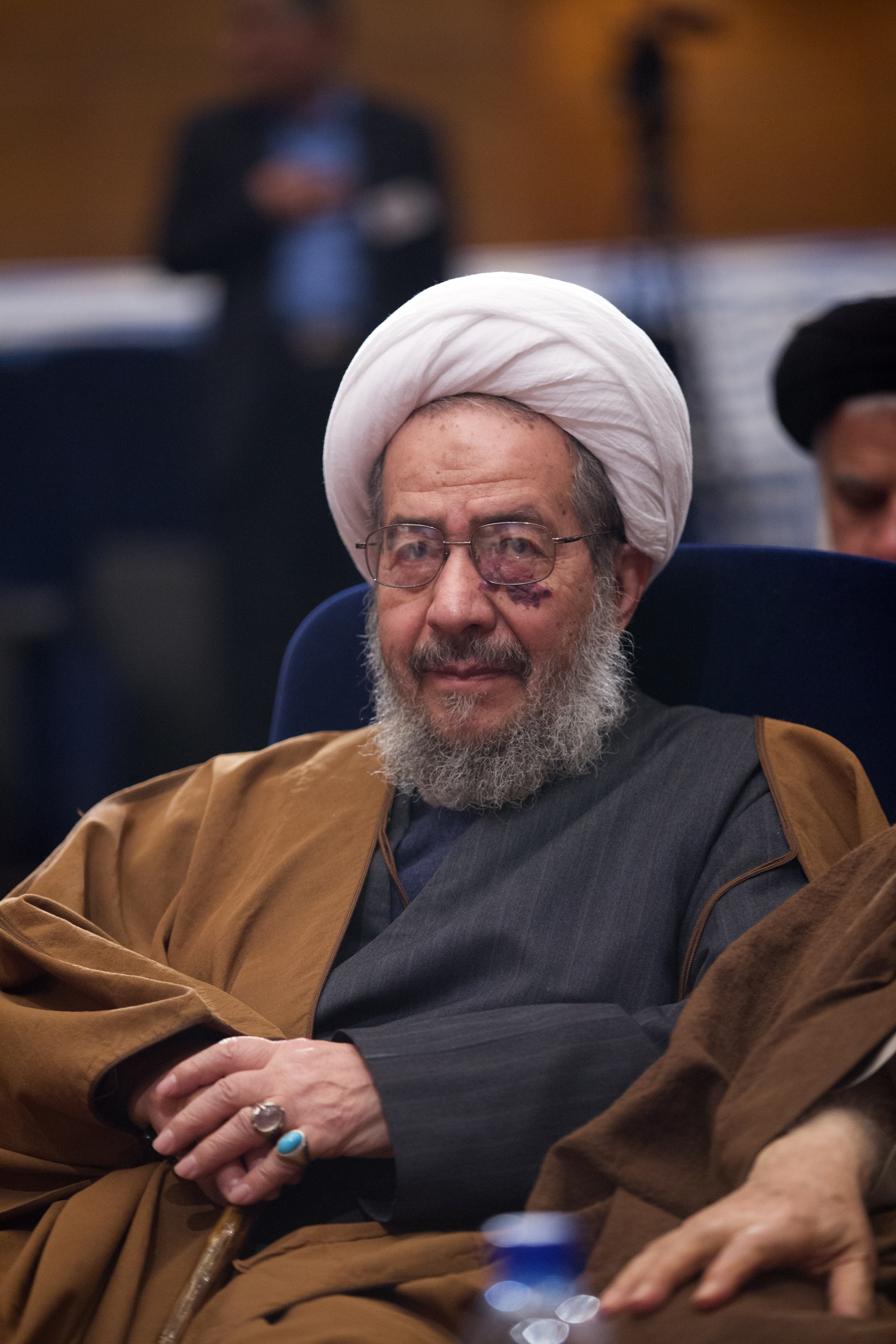
- Morteza Moghtadaei during the Majles in Iran

Personal life
- Born: 12 October 1935 (age 90) Esfahan
- Education: Qom Seminary

Member of Assembly of Experts
- Incumbent
- Assumed office 8 October 1990
- Preceded by: Abbas Izadi
- Constituency: Esfahan province

8th Prosecutor-General of Iran
- In office 1994–2001
- Appointed by: Mohammad Yazdi
- Preceded by: Abolfazl Mousavi Tabrizi
- Succeeded by: Abdul-Nabi Namazi

Religious life
- Religion: Islam
- Denomination: Twelver Shi'a
- Jurisprudence: Jafari
- Creed: Usuli

Morteza Moghtadai (Persian: مرتضی مقتدایی; born 12 October 1935 in Esfahan) is an Iranian Twelver Shi'a scholar, and deputy chairman of Society of Seminary Teachers of Qom. He was elected to the 2nd, 3rd, 4th, 5th and 6th Assembly of Experts. He currently resides in Isfahan and teaches in the city's seminary.

He was quoted as saying of the 2009 Iranian election protests that the "demonstrators were treading the path of the world's arrogance" and that "The regime must confront them".

== Biography ==
Moghtadaei was born in 1935 in Esfahan Hakim Mosque District. His father, Mirza Mahmoud Moghtadaei of Clergymen of that time was a disciple of Abdul-Karim Ha'eri Yazdi and Ruhollah Khomeini and Mohaghegh Damad, Ahmad Zanjani."

== Responsibilities ==
Some of his responsibilities after the revolution are as follows:

- Islamic Revolution Court judge
- Member and spokesman of the Supreme Judicial Council
- Chairman of the Supreme Court
- Chairman of the Supreme Court and prosecutor general
- Membership in the Society of Seminary Teachers of Qom
- Member of the Supreme Council of the Qom Seminary
- Manage seminaries
- Chairman of the Qom Seminary

== See also ==
- Hawza
- List of ayatollahs
- Prosecutor-General of Iran
- List of members in the Second Term of the Council of Experts
- List of members in the Third Term of the Council of Experts
- List of members in the Fourth Term of the Council of Experts
- List of members in the Fifth Term of the Council of Experts
