= Prosecutor General of Iran =

Five-year position in the Iran judiciary system

- Emblem of Iran

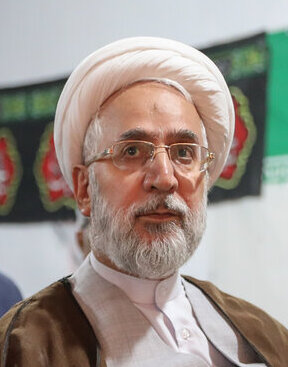
- Incumbent; Mohammad Movahedi Azad since August 6, 2023
- Style: Attorney General
- Appointer: Chief Justice of Iran
- Term length: 5 years
- Inaugural holder: Fathollah Banisadr
- Formation: 1979

The Prosecutor General of Iran, also known as Attorney General of Iran, is a "just mujtahid" in the judicial system of Iran. He is appointed by the Chief Justice of Iran in consultation with the judges of Supreme Court to serve for a period of five years.

As the head of the prosecutor-general's office, they supervise prosecutor's offices in the country. At the same time, they have executive responsibility for law enforcement, prosecutions, setting priorities in the hearings of cases in their role as the head of the public prosecution for the state.

== List of recent prosecutors-general ==
Name		Lifespan	Took office	Left office	Appointed by
1	Fathollah Banisadr	1931–1996	1979	1980	Asadollah Mobasheri
2	Abdul-Karim Mousavi Ardebili	1926–2016	1980	1981	Ruhollah Khomeini
3	Mohammad-Mehdi Rabbani Amlashi	1937–1985	1981	1983	Ruhollah Khomeini
4	Yousef Saanei	1937–2020	1983	1985	Ruhollah Khomeini
5	Mohammad Mousavi Khoeiniha	born 1945	1985	1989	Ruhollah Khomeini
6	Mohammad Reyshahri	1946–2022	1989	1991	Mohammad Yazdi
7	Seyed Abolfazl Mousavi Tabrizi	1935–2003	1991	1994	Mohammad Yazdi
8	Morteza Moghtadai	born 1936	1994	2001	Mohammad Yazdi
9	Abdul-Nabi Namazi	1945–2024	2001	2004	Mahmoud Hashemi Shahroudi
10	Ghorbanali Dorri-Najafabadi	born 1950	23 August 2004	24 August 2009	Mahmoud Hashemi Shahroudi
11	Gholam-Hossein Mohseni-Eje'i	born 1956	24 August 2009	23 August 2014	Sadeq Larijani Ebrahim Raisi Gholam-Hossein Mohseni-Eje'i
12	Ebrahim Raisi	1960–2024	23 August 2014	6 March 2016	Sadeq Larijani Ebrahim Raisi Gholam-Hossein Mohseni-Eje'i
13	Mohammad Jafar Montazeri	born 1949	1 April 2016	6 August 2023	Sadeq Larijani Ebrahim Raisi Gholam-Hossein Mohseni-Eje'i
14	Mohammad Movahedi-Azad	born 1960	6 August 2023	Incumbent	Gholam-Hossein Mohseni-Eje'i

== See also ==
- Judicial system of Iran
