= List of members in the Third Term of the Assembly of Experts =

The List of members from the third term of the Assembly of Experts. (Persian: فهرست نمایندگان دوره سوم مجلس خبرگان رهبری, romanized: Fehreste nâmâyandegân dore sevom majles-e khobregân-e rahbari) consists of names of the members during the third term of the Assembly of Experts from 1998 to 2006. Elections for the Assembly of Experts occurs every 8 years.

"Assembly of experts (of the Leadership)", or the "Council of Experts" is the deliberative body empowered to appoint and dismiss the Supreme Leader of Iran; and Seyyed Ali Khamenei is the current supreme leader of Iran. Ali Khamenei was the Leader during this term.

The elections took place on 23 October 1998, with the Inauguration occurring on 22 February 1999.

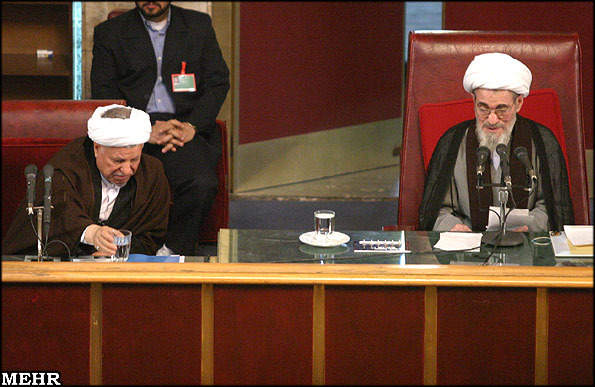
Akbar Hashemi Rafsanjani and Ali Meshkini attending the 13th Meeting in the Third Term of the Assembly of Experts

== Members ==
The list is ordered Alphabetically.

Members with * next to their name, indicates they died while in office.

- Ardabil
1. Khalil Boyukzadeh * (16 April 2001)
2. Mir Ebrahim Seyyed Hatami (Replaced Khalil Boyukzadeh)
3. Mostafa Norani Ardabili – (مصطفی نورانی اردبیلی) * (30 October 2003)
- Bushehr
1. Abdul-Nabi Namazi
- Chaharmahal and Bakhtiari
1. Ebrahim Amini
- East Azerbaijan
1. Ali Orumian
2. Hashem Hashemzadeh Herisi
3. Mirza Ali Ahmadi Mianji * (11 September 2000)
4. Mohsen Mojtahed Shabestari
5. Seyed Abolfazl Mousavi Tabrizi * (14 April 2003)
- Fars
1. Ahmad Beheshti
2. Ali Mohammad Dastgheib Shirazi
3. Assad-Allah Imani
4. Seyed Ali Asghar Dastgheib
5. Seyed Mohammad Hossein Hosseini Arsanjani – (سید محمدحسین حسینی ارسنجانی)
- Gilan
1. Abbas Mahfouzi
2. Mokhtar Aminian
3. Mohammad-Ali Taskhiri
4. Zaynolabideen Ghorbani
- Golestan
1. Habibollah Taheri Gorgani – (حبیب‌الله طاهری گرگانی)
2. Seyed Kazem Noor Mofidi
- Hamadan
1. Ahmad Saberi Hamadani
2. Seyed Abolhasan Mousavi Dabestani – (سید ابوالحسن موسوی دبستانی)
- Hormozgan
1. Mirza Ahmad Anvari * (June 2001)
- Ilam
1. Rahim Mohammadi – (رحیم محمدی)
- Isfahan
1. Hossein Mazaheri
2. Jalal Al-Din Taheri
3. Morteza Moghtadai
4. Seyed Abolhasan Mahdavi (Replaced Seyed Esmail Hashemi)
5. Seyed Esmail Hashemi – (سید اسماعیل هاشمی) * (11 September 1999)
6. Seyed Mahdi Yasrebi * (30 September 2006)
- Kerman
1. Ahmad Khatami
2. Ali Movahedi-Kermani
3. Mohammad Hashemian
- Kermanshah
1. Mohammad Hossein Zarandi
2. Zakerollah Ahmadi
- Khorasan
1. Abbas Vaez-Tabasi
2. Abolghasem Khazali
3. Ali Asghar Masoumi Shahroudi
4. Esmail Ferdowspoor
5. Habibollah Mehman Navaz
6. Hassan Alemi
7. Mahmoud Hashemi Shahroudi
8. Seyed Mahdi Abadi – (سید مهدی عبادی) * (20 March 2005)
- Khuzestan
1. Abbas Ka'bi
2. Ali Fallahian
3. Mohammad Ali Mousavi Jazayeri
4. Mohammad Reza Abbasi Fard
5. Mohsen Araki
6. Seyyed Ali Shafiei
- Kohgiluyeh and Boyer-Ahmad
1. Seyed Karamatollah Malek-Hosseini
- Kurdistan
1. Abdolqader Zahedi * (19 December 2005)
2. Mohammad Sheikh Al-Eslami
- Lorestan
1. Seyed Hassan Taheri Khoramabadi
2. Seyed Mohammad Naghi Shahrokhi Khoramabadi
- Markazi
1. Ahmad Mohseni Garakani
2. Seyed Abolfazel Mir Mohammadi
- Mazandaran
1. Hadi Rohani * (13 October 1999)
2. Norallah Tabresi (Replaced Hadi Rohani)
3. Seyed Jafar Karimi Divkalai
4. Seyed Saber Jabbari
5. Sadeq Larijani
- Qazvin
1. Ali Sheikh Mohmmadi Takandi – (علی شیخ محمدی تاکندی)
2. Seyed Hassan Mousavi Poor (Shali) – (سید حسن موسوی پور (شالی))
- Qom
1. Seyed Mahdi Rohani * (23 November 2000)
- Semnan
1. Hassan Rouhani
2. Mohammad Ali Alemi Damghani * (11 September 1999)
- Sistan and Baluchestan
1. Mohammad Eshagh Madani
2. Seyed Mojtaba Hosseini
- Tehran
1. Ahmad Jannati
2. Akbar Hashemi Rafsanjani
3. Ali Meshkini
4. Gholamreza Rezvani
5. Ghorbanali Dorri-Najafabadi
6. Majid Ansari
7. Mohammed Emami-Kashani
8. Mohammad Mohammadi Gilani
9. Mohammad Reyshahri
10. Mohammad-Reza Tavassoli
11. Mohammad-Taqi Mesbah-Yazdi
12. Mohammad Yazdi
13. Mohsen Kharazi
14. Mohsen Qomi
15. Reza Ostadi
16. Seyed Mohammad Bagher Asadi Khonsari – (سید محمدباقر اسدی خوانساری)
- West Azerbaijan
1. Ali Akbar Ghoreishi
2. Mir Akbar Ghaffar Gharabakh
3. Seyed Mohsen Mousavi Tabrizi
- Yazd
1. Seyed Abbas Khatam Yazdi – (سید عباس خاتم یزدی) * (11 September 2001)
- Zanjan
1. Seyed Esmaeil Mousavi Zanjani * (18 December 2002)

== See also ==
- 1998 Iranian Assembly of Experts election
- Assembly of Experts
- List of members in the First Term of the Council of Experts
- List of members in the Second Term of the Council of Experts
- List of members in the Fourth Term of the Council of Experts
- List of members in the Fifth Term of the Council of Experts
- List of members in the Sixth Term of the Council of Experts
- List of chairmen of the Assembly of Experts
