= Seyed Abolfazl Mousavi Tabrizi =

Iranian Ayatollah (1935-2003)

Ayatollah Seyyed Abolfazl Mousavi Tabrizi
- ابوالفضل موسوی تبریزی
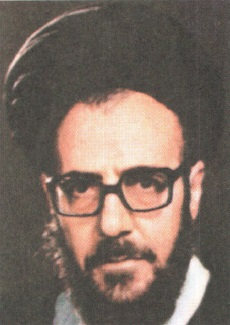
- Abolfazl Mousavi Tabrizi's portrait for the Assembly of Experts for Constitution in 1979.

Personal life
- Born: 1935 Tabriz
- Died: 14 April 2003 (aged 67–68) Tabriz
- Education: Qom Seminary

Religious life
- Religion: Islam
- Denomination: Twelver Shi'a
- Jurisprudence: Jafari
- Creed: Usuli

Muslim leader
- Teacher: Mohammad Kazem Shariatmadari, Ruhollah Khomeini

Member of Assembly of Experts for Constitution
- In office 19 August 1979 – 19 November 1979
- Constituency: East Azerbaijan Province

Member of the Islamic Consultative Assembly First and Second Term
- In office 28 May 1980 – 27 May 1988
- Constituency: Tabriz

Member of Assembly of Experts
- In office 10 December 1982 – 14 April 2003
- Preceded by: Office Began
- Succeeded by: Mohammad Feyz Sarabi
- Constituency: East Azerbaijan Province

Prosecutor-General of Iran
- In office 1991–1994
- Appointed by: Mohammad Yazdi
- Preceded by: Mohammad Reyshahri
- Succeeded by: Morteza Moghtadai

Abolfazl Rihani, was known as Abolfazl Mousavi Tabrizi (Persian: ابوالفضل موسوی تبریزی 1935 – 14 April 2003). He was a member of the Assembly of Experts, involved with the creation of the Constitution of the Islamic Republic of Iran being a member of the Assembly of Experts for Constitution, and was the Prosecutor-General of Iran.

== Birth and education ==
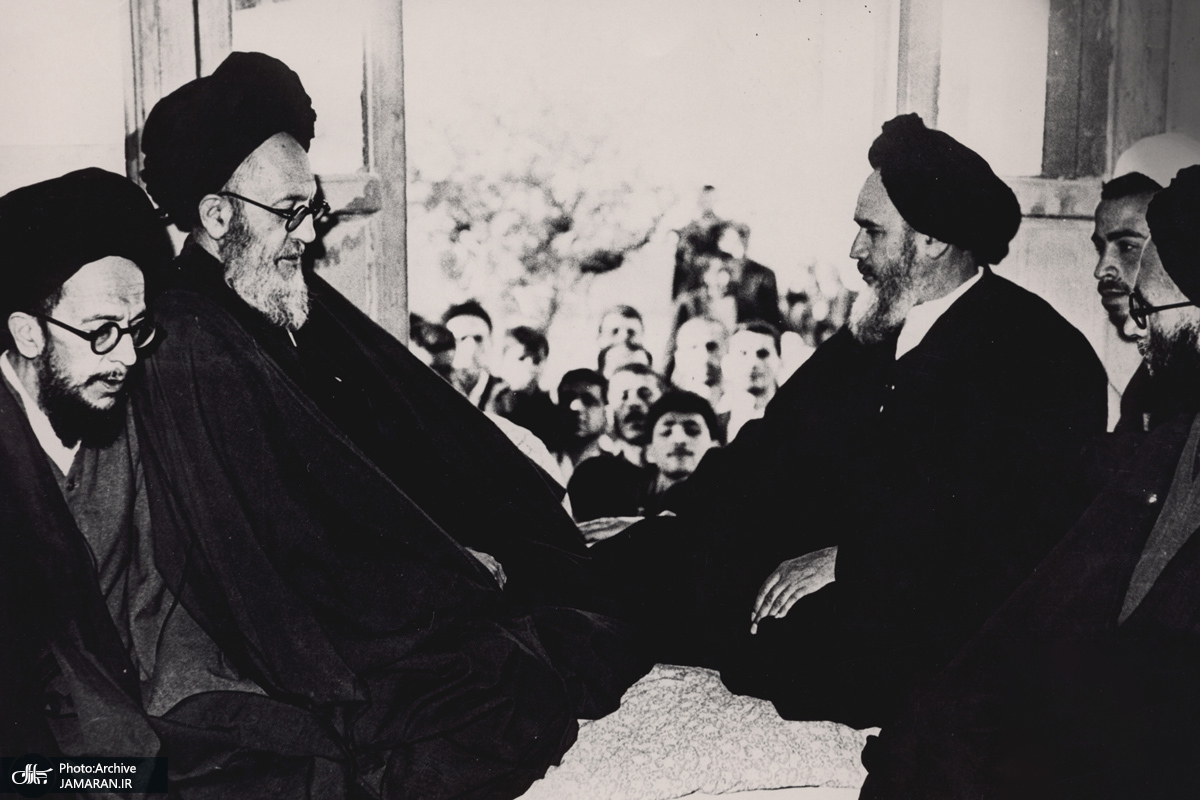
Abolfazl Mousavi Tabrizi alongside Grand Ayatollah Shariatmadari and Grand Ayatollah Khomeini before his exile in the 1960s.

Abolfazl Mousavi was born in the city of Tabriz in East Azerbaijan to a religious family. His father's family were a religious clerical family in Tabriz and as a result of this, at the age of 13 Abolfazl Mousavi began his Islamic studies at the Hasaneh Padshah School in Tabriz. After excelling in his studies, he went to Qom to begin his studies in the Seminary. At the age of 27, he began his studies in Dars-e-Kharej (lit. 'beyond the text'), and Principles of Islamic jurisprudence taught by Ruhollah Khomeini. After these studies, he attended classes of Grand Ayatollah Mohammad Kazem Shariatmadari.

== Political life ==
Before the Iranian Revolution Abolfazl Mousavi was involved with spreading the tapes of Khomeini and getting the people to back him in Tabriz during his exile. In the Seyyed Hamzeh Mosque in Tabriz, he called on people to follow the path of Khomeini, this led to him being arrested by SAVAK. After his release, he fled to Qom, where he became a member of the Society of Teachers of the Seminary of Qom and, along with other members of this group, issued statements against the Pahlavi regime.

After the Revolution, Abolfazl Mousavi was very close to Grand Ayatollah Shariatmadari, however due to the infamous clash between him and Khomeini, Tabrizi distanced himself from Shariatmadari. He was a member of the Assembly of Experts for three terms, he represented Tabriz in the Islamic Consultative Assembly, was involved with the creation of the Constitution, was a member of Assembly of Experts for Constitution, and was also the Attorney General of Iran.

== Works ==
- Letters in Guardianship of the Islamic Jurist.

== See also ==
- List of ayatollahs
- Usul Fiqh in Ja'fari school
- List of members in the First Term of the Council of Experts
- List of members in the Second Term of the Council of Experts
- List of members in the Third Term of the Council of Experts
- Prosecutor-General of Iran
