= Hashem Aghajari =

Iranian historian (born 1957)

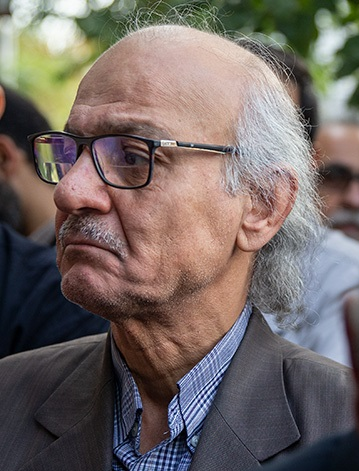
- Aghajari in 2019
- Born: Seyyed Hashem Aghajari; 1957 (age 68–69); Abadan, Iran
- Political party: Mojahedin of the Islamic Revolution of Iran Organization

Academic background
- Education: Shahid Beheshti University; Tarbiat Modares University
- Thesis: Clergy and Sultanate in Safavid Persia (1995)
- Doctoral advisor: Ehsan Eshraghi
- Influences: Ali Shariati

Academic work
- Discipline: History
- Institutions: Tarbiat Modares University
- Main interests: Safavid Iran
- Notable works: "Shariati and Islamic Protestanism"

Seyyed Hashem Aghajari (Persian: سید هاشم آقاجری, born 1957) is an Iranian historian, university professor and a critic of the government of the Islamic Republic who was sentenced to death in 2002 for apostasy for a speech he gave on Islam urging Iranians to "not blindly follow" Islamic clerics. In 2004, after domestic Iranian and international outcry, his sentence was reduced to five years in prison.

His prosecution generated large protest crowds and was seen as a "test case" in the struggle between Iranian reformists and hard-liners over the future of the Islamic Republic, with liberal reformists seeking greater freedom and hardliners defending the orthodoxy of the Guardianship of the Islamic Jurist.

== Background ==
Hashem Aghajari served in the Iran–Iraq War where he lost his right leg below the knee, and his brother. He has been described as having an "impeccable Islamic revolutionary record."

At least prior to his speech controversy he was a history professor at Tarbiat Modares University, a teacher-training college in Tehran.

As of November 2002 he belonged to the Islamic Revolutionary Mujahidin Organisation ("a left-wing" reformist political group).

== 2002 speech ==
In June 2002, Aghajari gave an address in Hamadan in Western Iran, commemorating the 25th anniversary of the death of Dr. Iranian Islamic thinker Ali Shariati in which he criticized some of the current orthodox Islamic practices in Iran as being in contradiction with the original teachings and practices of Islam, and calling for "Islamic Protestantism" and reform in Islam. He questioned the regime's underlying interpretation of Guardianship of the Jurisconsult, the system under which an Islamic cleric rules over society as Supreme Leader. Aghajari critiqued the idea of emulation (taqlid), which calls on every Shiite to follow a high-ranking cleric as his or her source of emulation.

This prompted an "immediate outcry" from hardline clerics, who claimed that he was attacking "the Prophet of Islam and fundamental Shiite Islamic traditions", despite the fact that Dr. Aghajari has repeatedly denied that his speech was intended as an attack on Islam or the Prophet.

== Arrest, trial, imprisonment, release ==
He was arrested 8 August 2002, tried for a few months, and then sentenced to death in early November. The trial was criticized not only for its harshness but for falling "far short of international standards of due process," being "conducted behind closed doors", and giving the defendant "only limited access to his lawyer." Aghajari was sentenced to death for apostasy and insulting the imams of Shi'i Islam. On other charges he was sentenced to 74 lashes, 8 years in jail, and a 10-year ban on teaching activities, (though the jail sentence and ban would have been irrelevant if he was executed).

Although other controversial death sentences have been reduced on appeal, Aghajari refused to appeal the ruling, announcing through his lawyer that "those who have issued this verdict have to implement it if they think it is right or else the judiciary has to handle it." While in prison his family reported that Aghajari's amputated leg stub was bruised and infected and that he was "unable to stand up, walk or use the prison's hygiene facilities." The human rights group, Amnesty International, campaigned against the sentence.

The death sentence was denounced by many, including the Iranian parliament, President Mohammad Khatami, and Grand Ayatollah Hossein-Ali Montazeri. Demonstrations against the sentence began the day after it was made public on November 6. They are thought to have attracted no more than 5000 participants but nonetheless were "the most serious protests in Iran since 1999". As demonstrations grew, they are believed to have provoked Supreme Leader Ali Khamenei to order a review of the verdict but also a threat to use "popular forces" (Basij) against the demonstrators.

According to The Economist magazine, Supreme leader Khamenei ordered the judiciary to review Aghajari's death sentence, but "hardliners in the judiciary" (prosecutor general Abdolnabi Namazi)) "at first ignored" his order "then assigned their least lenient judges to the review."

He was later convicted on lesser charges of "insulting sacred Islamic tenets" and sentenced to three years in jail, two years in probation, and five years' suspension of his social rights by the Supreme Court of Iran. In May 2004 the original regional court reinstated the death sentence, but the next month Iran's Supreme Court again reduced it.

He was released from prison July 31, 2004 after paying a bail of $122,500, according to the Associated Press.

=== Explanation ===
According to Radio Farda the anger of regime supporters sparked by his speech might "have cost him his life" were it not for the support given him by students and academics.

According to Mashallah Shamsolvaezin, a "leading Iranian newspaper editor and confidant of Iranian President Mohammad Khatami" interviewed by Newsweek magazine, the arrest and stiff sentence were an attempt to distract attention from two bills to increase the power of president and curb the hard-liner conservatives' supervisory power which reformist President Khatami had introduced into Parliament.

The failure of Iran's Hezbollah paramilitaries to make "a serious attempt to break up" the peaceful reformist student protests over the sentence was thought to be associated with Supreme Leader Khamenei's implicit criticism of the sentence and the "impartiality" of his failing to side with conservative hardliners.

== Post release statements/activities ==
During a seminar in 2008, he spoke out against the notion of the crime of apostasy. In 2014, he was again arrested, tried and convicted. He was sentenced to one year in prison on the charge of "propaganda against the regime".

In an article in the July 2019 edition of the pro-reform magazine Iran-e Farda (Iran of Tomorrow), Aghajari argued that the political system of the Islamic Republic cannot be reformed and that "the relatively open" political climate of the late 1990s and early 2000s marked not the beginning of democratic reform but its limit under the Islamic regime.

"People voted for Khatami based on hope in the future, while they voted for Rouhani fearing what might the future hold." [But] "when you promote the idea of choosing between bad and worse, then you blur the boundaries between reform and non-reform. At the same time, you keep reducing expectations for the future."

In April 2023 Aghajari was a speaker at the "Dialogue to save Iran" conference, and was considered close to leader of the Green Movement Mir-Hossein Mousavi. Shortly after regime agents ransacked his home, seized his electronic devices including his laptop, and told him to appear at the Islamic Revolutionary Court on May 24.

== Publications ==
- The Role Of The Policies Of The Successors Of The Malikshah In The Political Instability Of The Seljuk State, 2018 (Co-author)
- The challenge of carpet job-shop in the Qajar period with developments affected by the Industrial Revolution, Journal of Iranian Islamic Period History 2021. (Co-author)
- The Influence of Nader Shah's Militarism Policies on the Iranian Foreign Trade, Journal of Iranian Islamic Period History 2018. (Co-author)
- Aghajari, Hashem; Zonourian, Vahid; Sadeghi, Maghsod Ali (2019). "Exploring the role of mortmain in the lives of the poor (with an emphasis on the Rashid-al-din hamedani actions)". Journal of Iran History. 11 (2): 29–56.
- Aghajari, Hashem; Babaei, Siab Ali; Janahamadi, Fatemeh (2019). "The Historical Perspective Of Isma' Ilis Philosophical Components". Historical Perspective & Historiography. 29 (33): 55–75.
- Aghajari, Hashem; Fasihi, Simin; Abbasi, Somayeh (2020). "Language And Time In The Narrative Of The Political Women Memoir Writers Of The Pahlavi Era". Language Related Research (Comparative Language and Literature Research). 10 (5): 73–100.
- Aghajari, Hashem; Shafaeipour, Mahboube; Janahmadi, Fatemeh (2020). "The Sultans And Faqih' S Relationships In Egypt In Mamluk Era". Journal of Historical Studies of Islam. 12 (44): 85–106.
- Aghajari, Seyed Hashem; Mohsen, Nourmohammad (2021). "The Tudeh Party and the Marxist-Leninist Concept of the "National Question" in Iran (1941-1979)". Historical Sciences Studies. 13 (3): 1–26. doi:10.22059/jhss.2021.327103.473450.

== Awards and honors ==
- Jan Karski Award for Moral Courage (2003)

== See also ==
- Human rights in Islamic Republic of Iran
- Chained Murders of Iran
