= Abdullah Musawi Shirazi =

Iranian Grand Ayatollah (1892-1984)

Grand Ayatollah Sayyed Abdullah al-Shirazi
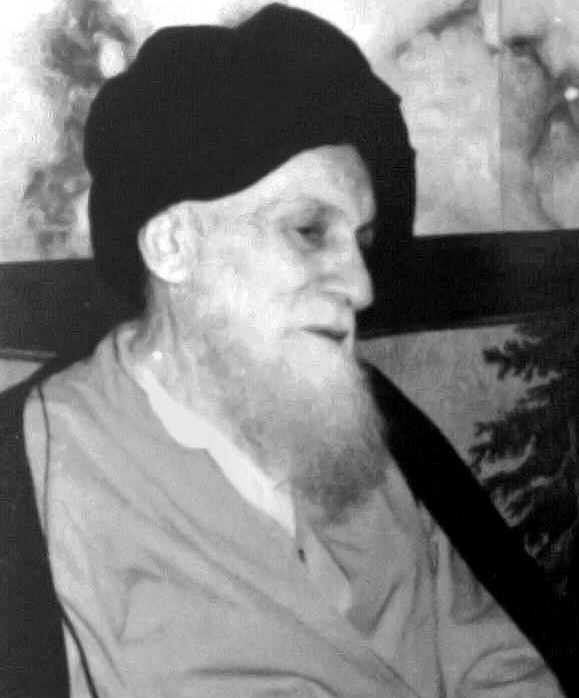

Personal life
- Born: February 25, 1892 Shiraz, Iran
- Died: September 29, 1984 (aged 92) Mashhad, Iran

Religious life
- Religion: Twelver Shia Islam

Grand Ayatollah Sayyed Abdullah Al-Musawi Al-Shirazi (February 25, 1892 – September 29, 1984) was a Grand Ayatollah of Twelver Shi'a Islam.

== Life ==
Grand Ayatollah Haj Sayyed Abdullah al-Shirazi was born in Shiraz, Iran. At the age of 15 he was sent into exile with his father, Ayatollah Sayyed Muhammad Tahir al-Shirazi, for resisting the Qajar and British colonial rule in southern Iran. His father was a nationally renowned cleric who was known for his resistance against the British government.

In 1914 he was sent to Najaf, Iraq to study advanced Islamic jurisprudence under Shaikh Na'ini.

Al-Shirazi was sentenced to 4 years in prison in 1935, during the famous Goharshad Mosque rebellion in the city of Mashad against the anti-religious policies of Reza Shah Pahlavi. After his release, he returned to Najaf, and soon became one of the Marja of Taqleed of Shi'a there. The Marja of Taqleed are clerics that have the authority to declare fatwas and decrees into all matters of Islamic jurisprudence. Only a few exist at any given time.

In 1975 al-Shirazi returned to Iran and joined the movement against the last Shah of Iran, Mohammad Reza Pahlavi, until his government was overthrown in 1979. By then he had ascended to the rank of Grand Ayatollah, thus becoming one of the highest ranking clerics of the Shi'a faith.

He died on 29 September 1984 in Mashhad. Local papers reported a turnout of "a few hundred thousand people" for the funeral ceremony commemorating him at the Shrine of Imam Reza, including figures such as Ali Akbar Nategh-Nouri, Mohammad-Reza Mahdavi Kani, Abbas Vaez-Tabasi, and Yousef Saanei.

== Services and accomplishments ==
- Established two of the largest schools of Fiqh in Najaf, Iraq.
- Established the largest school of Fiqh in Mashad, Iran.
- Founded 180 institutes on Fiqh in Iran, Iraq, Syria, Lebanon, Pakistan, India, and a few African countries.
- Founded the Ayatollah al-Udhma Al-Shirazi Hospital in Mashad, Iran. In 1984, it served 43,000 patients. Clerics and their families were provided free insurance coverage.
- Founded an elementary school in Najaf.
- Founded the Tahiriyah mosque in Najaf.
- Founded the Al-Shirazi Library in Najaf.
- Founded dormitories for international clerical students in Najaf.
- Founded the Tahiriyah Husayniyah mosque in Kufa, Iraq.
- Founded the Al-Shirazi Library in Mashad, Iran.
- Founded two mosques in Mashad.
- Built and donated 130 houses for the earthquake victimes of Tabas in 1978.
- Built and donated 24 houses for the earthquake victimes of Feiz abad, Gha'enat in Khorasan province in 1979.
- Reconstructed and donated large parts of Shirvan, Khorasan, after the earthquake of 1980.
- Reconstructed and donated large parts of Khuzestan province, after devastating floods in 1979.
- Reconstructed and donated large parts of Kerman province, after the earthquake of 1981.
- Established a foundation that helped clerics and the destitute purchase housing.
- Constructed more than 60 schools in India, Pakistan, and a few African countries.
- Helped pay for tuition and boarding costs of students in Samarra and Kazimain, Iraq.
- Helped pay for publication costs of Islamic studies in various countries.
- Founded a large surgery unit at the Zahra hospital in Beirut.
- Paid for foster care institutes in southern Lebanon.
- Founded 4 clinics for healthcare in India.
- Helped cover living costs for Iranian families afflicted by the Iran-Iraq war.
- Helped cover living costs for tens of thousands of Iraqi families afflicted by Saddam Hussein.

== Works ==
- Umdat-il wasa'il fil Hashiyat ila al-rasa'il, on the writings of Shaikh Ansari, in 4 volumes.
- Kitab il-Ghaza, on Islamic Jurisprudence, in 2 volumes.
- Al-Durr baydh fi munjazat al-maridh, on the debate of Fiqh concerning hereditary issues.
- Azahat ul-shobahat fil shakk fil raka'aat, on the debate of Fiqh concerning the details of prayers.
- Raf'al hajib fil Ujrat ila al-wajib, on the debate of Fiqh concerning the ahkaam for revenues.
- Azahat ul-shubahat fi hukm il-afagh al-muttahidah wal mottafiqah, on the debate of Fiqh concerning the observation of the Moon for calculations of the solar calendar.
- Sayyid, Musawi Shirazi. Peshawar Nights. Ansariyan Publications - Qum.
- Al-tuhfat ol-Kadhimiyah fi qatl al-hayawanat bil-alat al-kahruba'iyah, on the debate of Fiqh concerning the ahkaam for slaughtering farm animals with electric devices.
- Al-risalat al-Rajabiyah, a commentary about Hijab from Quranic and traditional perspectives.
- Al-risalat al-rabi'iyah fi tashih al-niyabah al-ibadiyah, on the debate of Fiqh concerning prayers.
- Al-mas'alat al-roju'iyah fi hukm al-mutlaqah al-raj'iyah, on the debate of Fiqh concerning divorce laws.
- Al-hashiyah al-al'urwatih al-wuthqa, a review on the debate of Fiqh concerning all issues written by Allama Sayyed Muhammad Yazdi, in his book al'urwatih al-wuthqa.
- Al-ihtijajat al-ashra, a discussion on the Sunni-Shi'a debate. Translated into Persian, English, Urdu, and Gujarati, and published several times.
- Al-imamat wal Shi'at, on the topic of Imamate in Shi'a Islam.
- Pushesh e zan az didgaah e Islam, in Persian, about Hijab in Islam.
- Imam wa Imamat, on the topic of Imamate in Islam.
- Munazerat-i dah ganeh, a discussion on the Sunni-Shi'a debate with Sunni scholars, in Persian.
- Dhakhirat al-saliheen, a collection of all the Fatwas declared by Ayatollah Shirazi, in 2 volumes.
- Towdhih al-Masa'il, another collection of all Fatwas declared by Ayatollah al-Shirazi, translated into English.
- Manasik hajj, available in English, on the details of the Hajj pilgrimage.
- Anis al-Muqalladeen, translated in 1984 into Persian.

== See also ==
- Muslim scholars
- Mashad
- Qom
- Shi'as
- Central Library of Astan Quds Razavi
- Ali Orumian
