= Courthouse of Tehran =

Building in Tehran, Iran

- کاخ دادگستری تهران
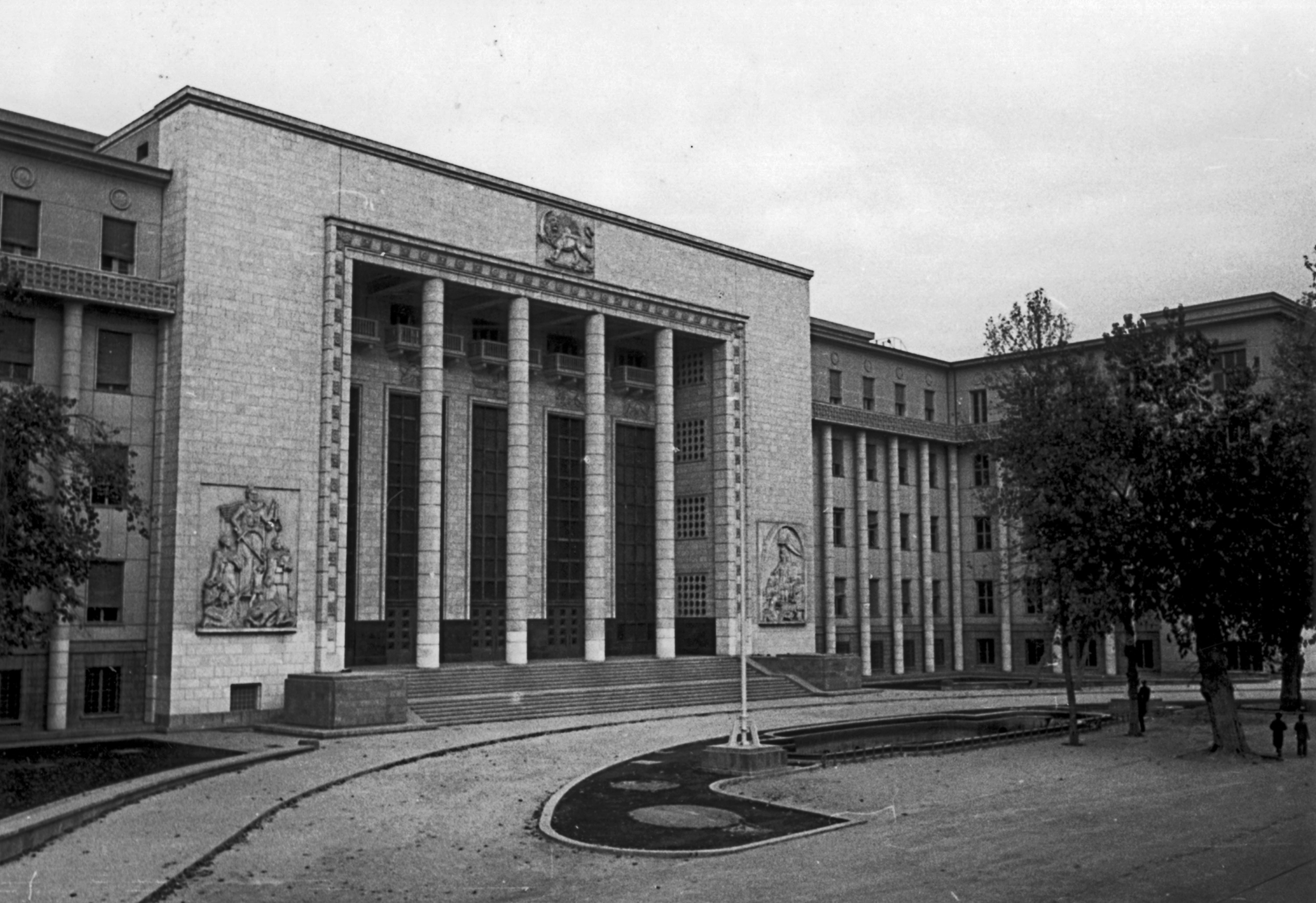
- Courthouse of Tehran in the 1970s
- Interactive map of the Courthouse of Tehran area

General information
- Architectural style: Neoclassical
- Location: Tehran, Iran
- Coordinates: 35.6816°N 51.4189°E
- Completed: 1946

Design and construction
- Architect: Stanislav Suva

Courthouse of Tehran (Persian: کاخ دادگستری تهران, romanized: Kāx-e Dādgostari-ye Tehrān), also known as the Palace of Justice, is a historic courthouse in Tehran, Iran. The building was designed by Czech architect Stanislav Sůva in the Neoclassical style to house 1,200 employees, serving as the Ministry of Justice, the law court, and the criminal and civil courts.

Architecturally, the most important features of the building are the entrance hall, the main court hall, the offices and side rooms for the court, and the dining area and kitchen. Skoda began construction on the Palace of Justice between 1938 and 1946. Ing Arch Suva, a Czech architect who studied at the University of Architecture and Civil Engineering in Prague before being employed by "Société Iranienne Skoda", elaborated the sketch for the front face of the building in "European monumental conception".

== History ==
It was necessary that the architecture had a sense of permanence and a contemporaneous character in an Iranian style, which is intelligible to Iranian people but freed from excessive archaism. The designs for skirting parts had been elaborated by lead architect Suva and was entrusted to architect Tiyvoran. Architects Kopp and Jan Gabriel worked on the lining and embossing parts. Stone-dressing works and other craft-works, which were done by many Iranian workers, were managed by Czech experts and engineers.

In 1940, Suva was ordered to return to Prague, which was already occupied by Nazi Germany. He refused and was employed in the constructional department of the Ministry of Finance. Jan Gabriel, who worked out different architectural details on the front facade, the entrance door, and the ceiling stucco in the interiors, previously worked on the Shah Opera, and afterwards on the Shah Spa in Balborsán.

Construction on the building was suspended during World War II during the reign of Reza Shah Pahlavi.

Today, the Supreme Court of Iran is based in this building.

On 18 January 2025, the building was the location of the assassination of Ali Razini and Mohammad Moghiseh, two senior Sharia judges, by a gunman who killed himself after trying to flee the scene. Another judge and a bodyguard also were injured in the attack.

== Gallery ==
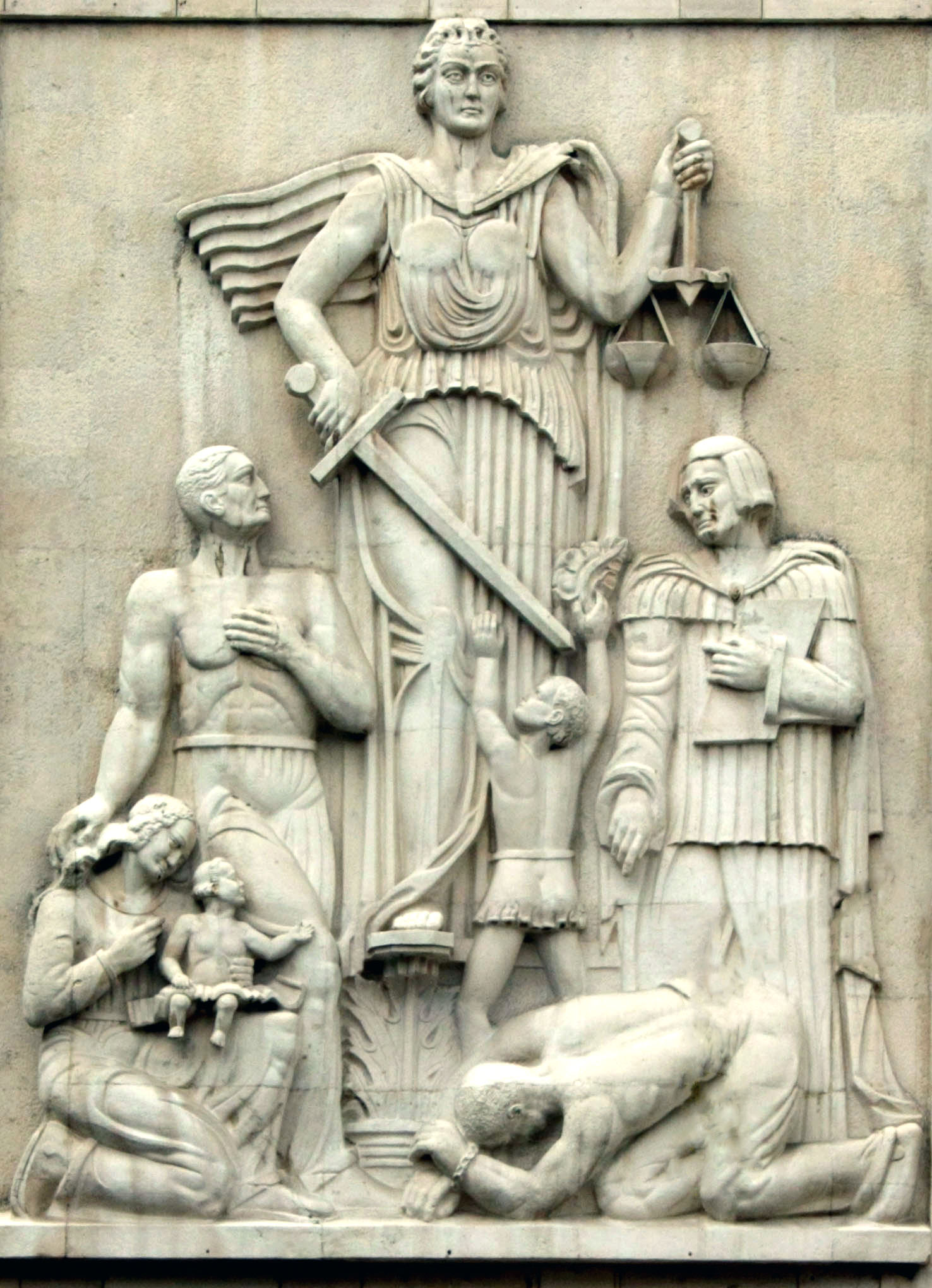
Lady Justice bas relief by Stanislav Suva; Sculptor Lajoš Biró

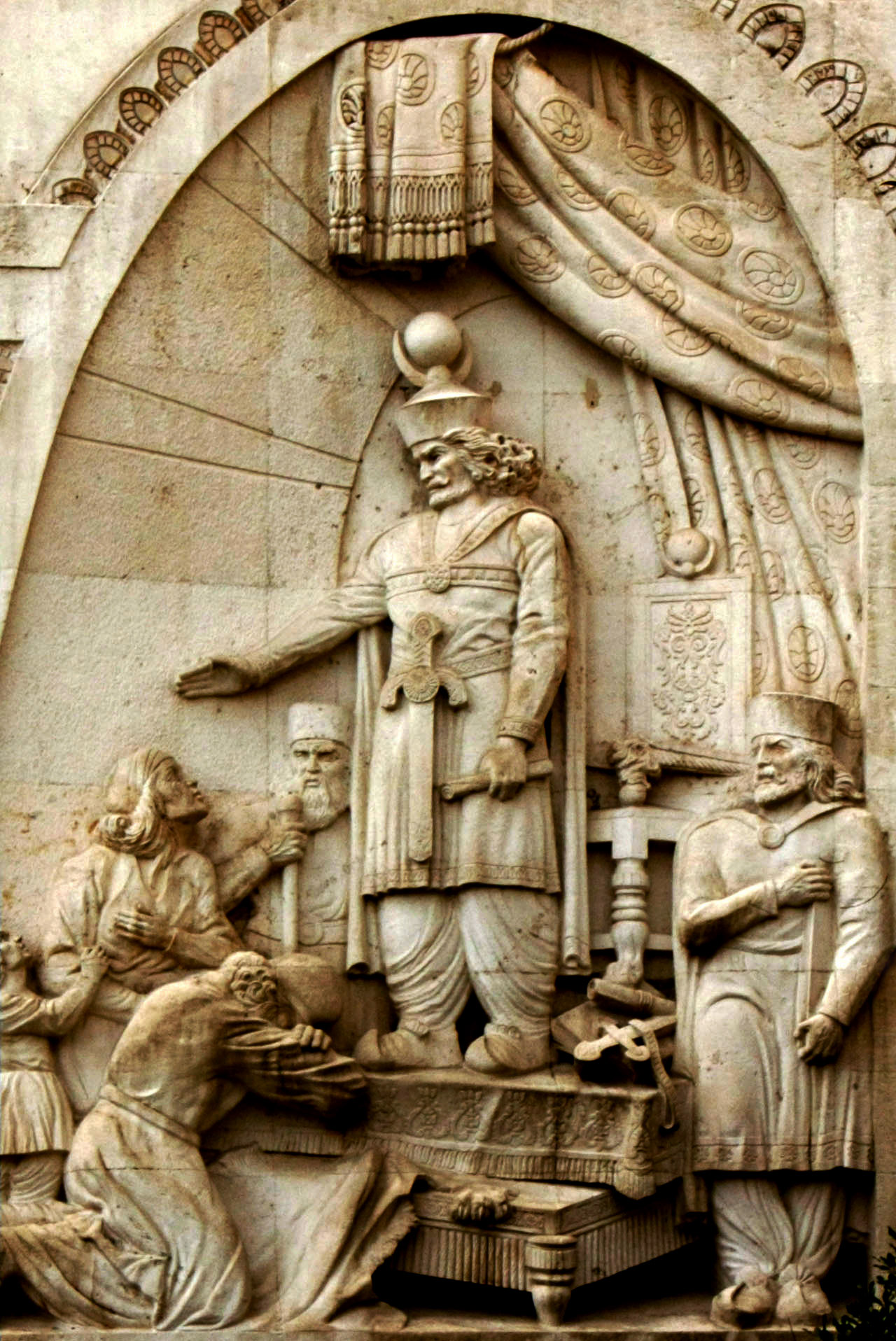
Statue of Anushiravan the Just by Qolam Reza Rahimzade Arzhang

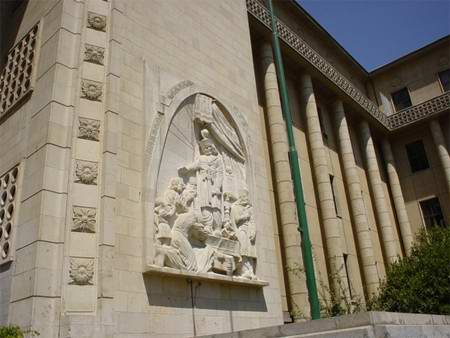
View from the side

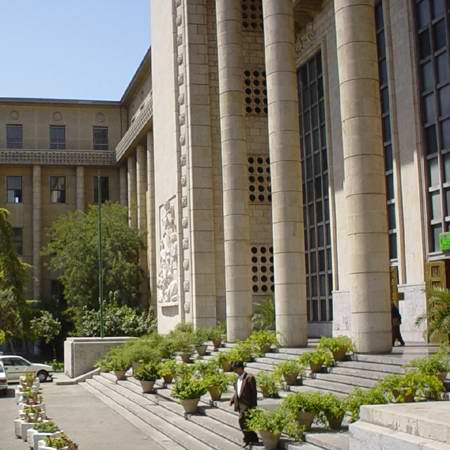
View of the front part
