= Mohammad Jafar Montazeri =

Iranian cleric

- محمدجعفر منتظری
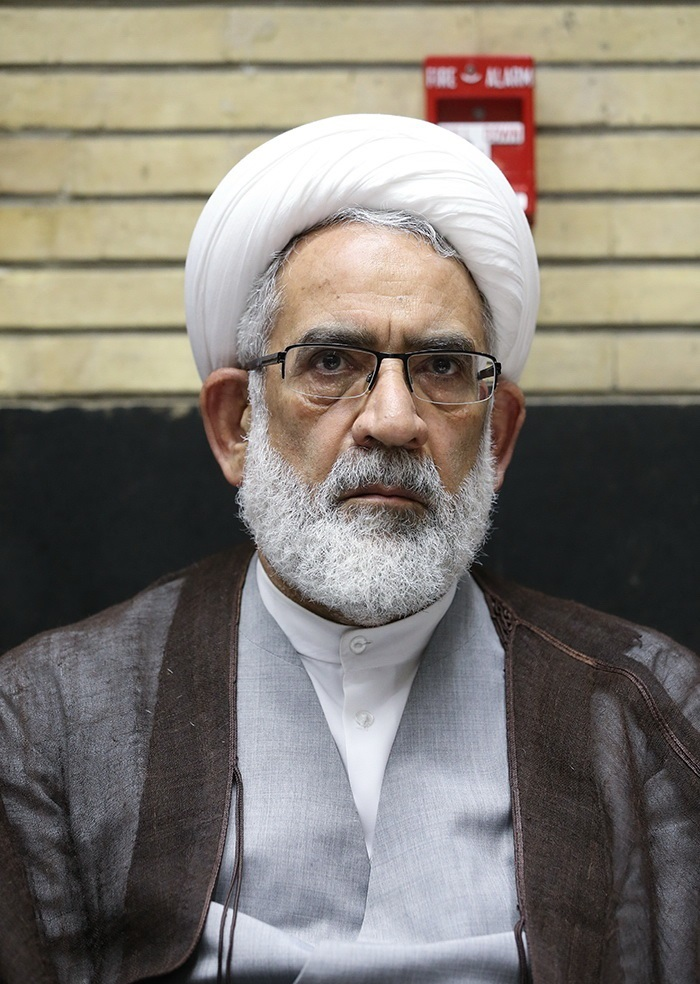

Head of Supreme Court of Iran
- Incumbent
- Assumed office 6 August 2023
- Appointed by: Gholam-Hossein Mohseni-Eje'i
- Preceded by: Ahmad Mortazavi Moghaddam

Prosecutor-General of Iran
- In office 1 April 2016 – 6 August 2023
- Appointed by: Sadeq Larijani
- Preceded by: Ebrahim Raisi
- Succeeded by: Mohammad Movahedi-Azad

Head of Special Clerical Court
- Incumbent
- Assumed office 2012
- Appointed by: Ali Khamenei
- Preceded by: Ali Razini

Personal details
- Born: 1949 (age 76–77) Qom, Iran
- Party: Combatant Clergy Association
- Education: Qom Seminary

Mohammad Jafar Montazeri (Persian: محمدجعفر منتظری; born 1949 in Qom) is an Iranian cleric and jurist, who is the current Head of the Supreme Court of Iran since August 6, 2023. He was the prosecutor-general of Iran from April 1, 2016 to August 6, 2023. He was previously the Head of Iran's Administrative Justice Court. He is also the current Head of the Special Clerical Court.

== Sanctions ==
Sanctioned by United States and United Kingdom.
