= Islamic Revolutionary Court =

Court system in Iran

- دادگاه انقلاب اسلامی (Persian)
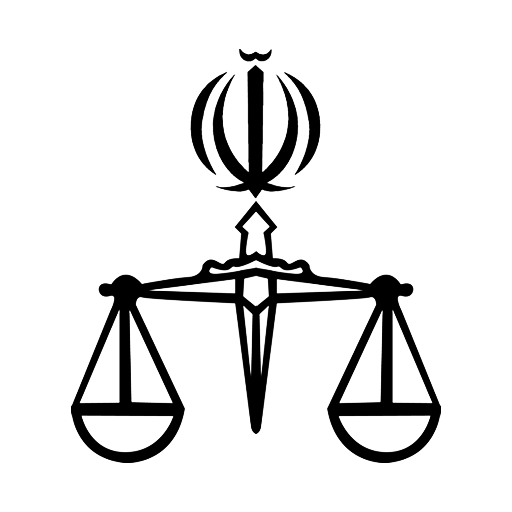
- Logo of the Judicial system of the Islamic Republic of Iran
- Established: 11 February 1979; 47 years ago
- Jurisdiction: Islamic Republic of Iran

Chief Justice of Iran
- Currently: Gholam-Hossein Mohseni-Eje'i
- Since: 1 July 2021; 5 years ago

Islamic Revolutionary Court (Persian: دادگاه انقلاب اسلامی, romanized: Dādgāh-e Enqelāb-e Eslāmī), also known as the Revolutionary Tribunal (Dadgahha-e Enqelab), is a system of special courts in the Islamic Republic of Iran that handles cases defined by the state as "crimes against the revolution" (جرائم علیه انقلاب) or threats to national security. These include charges such as smuggling, blasphemy, "acting against national security", espionage, inciting unrest, insulting the Supreme Leader, and alleged attempts to overthrow the Islamic government. The courts have been described by journalists and scholars as operating with limited judicial safeguards, and the early tribunals were characterised by historian Michael Axworthy as "essentially 'kangaroo courts' dressed in revolutionary rhetoric". Human-rights organizations report that the courts exercise broad discretionary powers, often hold closed proceedings, and rely on standards that differ significantly from those of Iran's ordinary judiciary.

In the years immediately after the 1979 Iranian Revolution, the Revolutionary Courts became the primary venue for prosecuting individuals labelled by the new government as political or ideological enemies.

The court was known for its secretiveness, for coming to verdicts with "no jury, no defence lawyers and often no evidence beyond a confession extracted ... by means of torture". From 1979–1989 the Revolutionary Court sent "more than 16,000 people" to their deaths, according to the Iran Tribunal campaign group.

Amnesty International documented more than 1,200 executions in the first five months of 1979 alone, noting that many victims were civilian officials and Artesh military officers and commanders of the former state with no demonstrated involvement in repression. Contemporary observers, including the CIA World Factbook and later human-rights investigations, described the courts as instruments for eliminating perceived ideological opponents.

On 1 March 2026, as part of the 2026 Israeli–United States strikes on Iran, the Tehran Revolutionary Court was bombed and its building was destroyed.

== Jurisdiction ==
The jurisdiction of the Revolutionary Courts, as amended in 1983, encompasses

1. All of the offenses against the internal and external security of the Country, combating and behaving in a corruptly manner on the earth.
2. Uttering slander against the Founder of the Islamic Republic of Iran and the Honorable Leader.
3. Conspiracy against the Islamic Republic of Iran or carrying arms, use of terrorism, destruction of building against the Islamic Republic.
4. Engaging in espionage for aliens.
5. All crimes involving smugglings and narcotic items.
6. The cases pertinent to Article 49 of the Constitution of Iran.

Disputes over jurisdiction between the Revolutionary Courts and Iranian Penal Courts are resolved by the Iranian Supreme Court. To date, according to the Lawyers Committee for Human Rights, "it appears that there is a tendency to extend the jurisdiction of the Revolutionary Courts to all offenses which in the opinion of the authorities are not punished severely enough."

The trials are not public, there is no jury, and a single judge decides the matter at hand. Information on the trial is disclosed at the discretion of the government.

== History ==
=== Revolution ===
The revolutionary courts were created shortly after the overthrow of the monarchy and the arrival of Ayatollah Ruhollah Khomeini in Iran. The general goal of the court is thought to have been to seek vengeance against officials of Shah's regime and to eliminate military and civilian leaders who could try to overthrow the new Islamic government.

The first tribunal was convened secretly in Refah School in southern Tehran where Khomeini had set up his headquarters. The first four death sentences were issued by Hojjat al-Islam Sadegh Khalkhali, approved by Khomeini, and carried out in the early hours of February 16, 1979. By early November, 550 people – mostly high ranking officials of Pahlavi and military commanders or ranks and some members of SAVAK – had been sent to the firing squads by revolutionary tribunals. Revolutionary Tribunals were set up in the major towns, with two courts in the capital of Tehran – one each in the prisons of Qasr and Evin, and one traveling tribunal for Sadegh Khalkhali who was known for handing out many death sentences. The courts presiding judges were clerics appointed by Khomeini himself.

At least at first, the revolutionary courts differ from standard Western law courts by limiting trials to a few hours, sometimes minutes. Defendants could be found guilty on the basis of "popular repute". The concept of a defense attorney was dismissed as a "Western absurdity". A charge that was widely applied against defendants but unfamiliar to some was Mofsed-e-filarz, or "spreading corruption on earth". This covered a variety of offenses – "insulting Islam and the clergy", "opposing the Islamic Revolution", "supporting the Pahlavis", and "undermining Iran's independence" by helping the 1953 coup and giving capitulatory privileges to the imperial powers".

The secrecy, vagueness of charges, lack of opportunity for defendants to defend themselves came under criticism from people such as Ayatollah Mohammad Kazem Shariatmadari, Hassan Tabatabai-Qomi and Prime Minister Mehdi Bazargan. But the court's swift and harsh sentences also had strong support from both Islamists and leftist groups such as the Tudeh party and People's Mujahedin of Iran. Khomeini responded to complaints saying that "criminals should not be tried, they should be killed". Judge Khalkhali stated "The revolutionary courts were born out of the anger of the Iranian people and these people will not accept any principles outside Islamic principles". Attempts by Bazargan to appeal to Khomeini to restrict the courts only led to the courts becoming "stronger and more firmly entrenched".

=== Since 1980 ===
According to political scientist and historian Ervand Abrahamian, the Revolutionary Courts participated in the secret mass killings of thousands of imprisoned members of the People's Mujahedin of Iran and other leftist organizations in 1988.

Although the Revolutionary Court normally deals with major economic and security crimes, in 2006 it was scheduled to try Cartoonist Mana Neyestani and his editor-in-chief Mehrdad Qassemfar "for inciting ethnic unrest" after a Neyestani cartoon triggered protests and violence among the Azerbaijani-speaking population in northwestern parts of Iran after appearing in a weekly supplement "Iran Jomeh".

In the 21st century some prosecutions by the Revolutionary Court includes:

- Iranian-American Washington Post reporter Jason Rezaian was arrested and tried and convicted in a closed-door revolutionary court trial. He was sentenced to an undisclosed prison sentence on November 22, 2015, but released in prisoner exchange on January 16, 2016. On the same day of his release, America released $1.7 billion in frozen Iranian accounts.
- Academic Hashem Aghajari, was tried, convicted and sentenced to death by a Revolutionary Court in the western city of Hamedan after delivering a speech critiquing the Islamic Republic doctrine of Guardianship of the Jurist and the religious doctrine of emulation (taqlid), which calls on every Shiite to follow a high-ranking cleric as his or her source of emulation. His verdict was eventually overturned and Aghajari released after paying a large fine.
- Three Iranian Christians (Victor Bet Tamraz, Amin Afshar Naderi, and Hadi Asgar) who were convicted of "conducting evangelism" and carrying out "illegal church activities" in 2017 and each received "a provisional sentence" of 10 years in prison.

== See also ==
- Judicial system of the Islamic Republic of Iran
- Political repression in the Islamic Republic of Iran
- Special Clerical Court
- Criticism of Islam
- Freedom of speech in Iran
- Corruption in Iran
- Smuggling in Iran
