= Mohammad Feyz Sarabi =

Iranian Ayatollah (1928–2022)

- محمد فیض سرابی
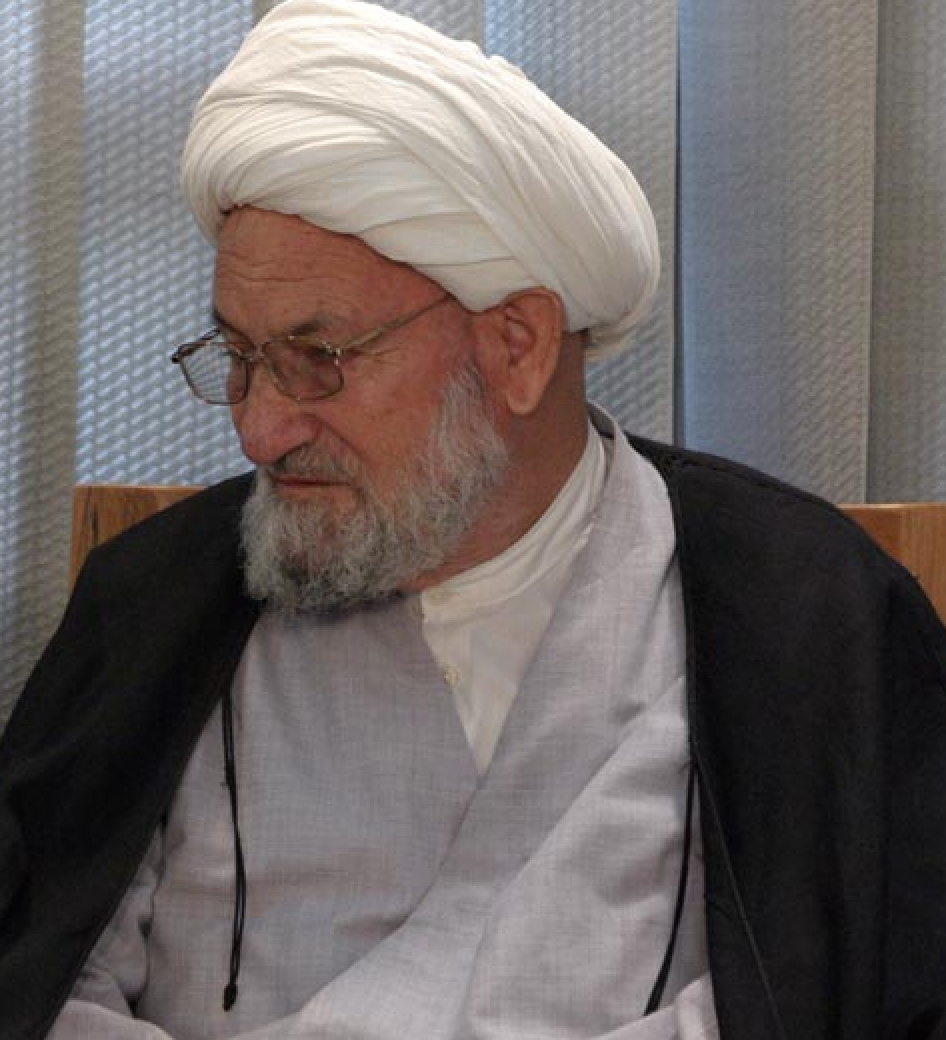
- Sarabi in a meeting of the Assembly of Experts in the house of Ali Khamenei in 2006

Member of the Assembly of Experts
- In office 15 December 2006 – 11 April 2022
- Preceded by: Seyed Abolfazl Mousavi Tabrizi
- Succeeded by: TBD
- Constituency: East Azerbaijan
- Majority: 415,041 (5th)
- Majority: 283,856 (4th)

Personal details
- Born: 23 August 1928 Sarab, East Azerbaijan, Iran
- Died: 11 April 2022 (aged 93)
- Education: Qom Hawza

Ayatollah Mohammad Feyz Sarabi (Persian: محمد فیض سرابی; 23 August 1928 – 11 April 2022) was an Iranian Shiite cleric and politician. He was a member of the 4th and 5thAssembly of Experts from the East Azerbaijan electorate. Feyzi won his membership with 283,856 votes.

== See also ==
- List of members in the Fourth Term of the Council of Experts
- List of members in the Fifth Term of the Council of Experts
- List of ayatollahs
