= Supreme Court of Iran =

Highest juridical authority in Iran

- دیوان عالی کشور
- Interactive map of Supreme Court of Iran
- 35°40′54″N 51°25′08″E
- Established: August 17, 1911; 114 years ago
- Jurisdiction: Iran
- Location: Courthouse of Tehran, Tehran
- Coordinates: 35°40′54″N 51°25′08″E
- Composition method: Chief Justice nomination upon advice by the Judicials.
- Authorised by: Constitution of Iran
- Judge term length: 5 years
- Number of positions: 42
- Website: divanealee.eadl.ir

Chief Justice
- Currently: Gholam-Hossein Mohseni-Eje'i
- Since: July 1, 2021; 4 years ago

The Supreme Court of Iran (Persian: دیوان عالی کشور, romanized: Divan-e 'Ali-ye Keshvar) is the highest juridical authority in Iran, established to supervise the correct implementation of laws by courts of justice and consisting of the most prominent judges of the country. The head of the judiciary assigns criteria to ensure uniformity of judicial procedure and to carry out all legal responsibilities.

The hearing of offenses committed by the head of the executive is also one of the functions of this court.

The General Board of the Supreme Court has the right to issue a "vote of judicial precedent", which enjoys the status of law. Judiciary branches of the Supreme Court have the right to hear complaints about lower courts' decisions. The parties involved in the legal proceeding do not appear in court unless the court cites them for explanations. The rulings issued by this court are in the form of annulment and confirmation of lower courts' decisions.

Article 161 of the Constitution of the Islamic Republic of Iran on the Supreme Court states:

Supreme Court of Iran is the highest juridical authority in Iran established to supervise the correct implementation of laws by courts of justice, to ensure uniformity of judicial procedure and to carry out the legal responsibilities being assigned to it based on the criteria determined by the head of the judiciary.

== History ==
The Supreme Court or Court of Cassation (Divān-e ʿāli-e tamiz) was established during the second constitutional period in 1911 as the highest court in Iran.

== Branches of the Supreme Court ==
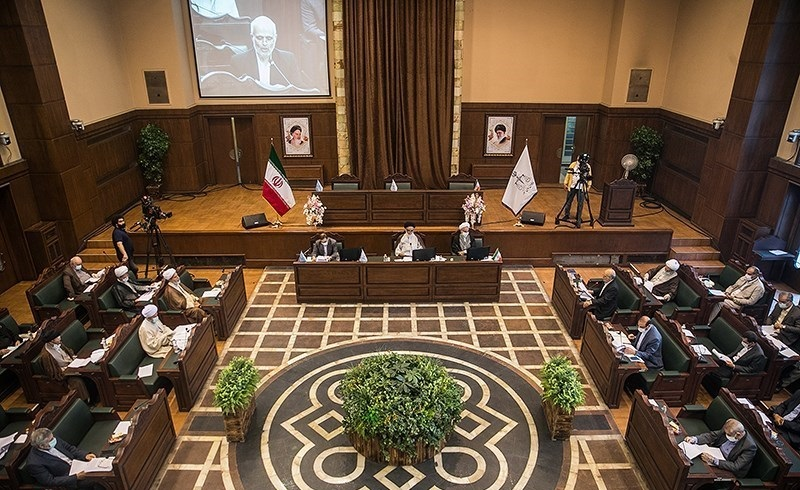
A meeting of the Supreme Court in June 2020

The Supreme Court is headquartered in Tehran and by May–June 2014 (Khordad 1393 SH), it has had 42 branches, of which 5 are in Qom, 3 in Mashhad and the rest are in Tehran. Each branch has two benches (a justice and a judge), and might have a magistrate who may assume the duties of each of the benches if necessary. Only the benches have the right to issue judgments.

== The Chief of the Supreme Court ==
The chief of the Supreme Court is nominated by the head of the judiciary for a period of five years in consultation with the judges of the Supreme Court. The chief of the Supreme Court must be mujtahid, even-handed and well-versed in judicial matters.

Currently Mohammad Jafar Montazeri presides over the Supreme Court of Iran.

== Duties ==
The General Board of the Supreme Court classifies matters given their nature (juridical, criminal, or issuing a vote of Judicial Precedent) into:

- The General Board of juridical branches consists of the chief of the Supreme Court and the judges of juridical branches and hears affirmed judgments of lower courts in juridical cases.
- The General Board of criminal branches convenes attended by the chief of the Supreme Court and the judges of criminal branches and hears affirmed judgments of lower criminal courts with regard to penal issues.
- The General Board of Judicial Precedent of the Supreme Court convenes attended by the chief of the court, judges and justices of all juridical and criminal branches in order to ensure uniformity of judicial procedure regarding conflicting judgments and orders issued by branches of this court as well as the conflicting orders of lower courts. The ruling issued by the General Board is binding for all nationwide juridical authorities.

=== Duties ===
- Supervising the correct implementation of laws by courts
- Ensuring uniformity of judicial procedure
- Serving as appeal authority for orders issued by military courts 1 and important rulings of Public and Islamic Revolutionary Court
- Hearing the charges against the heads of the executive in case of their transgressing Constitutional rules

== See also ==
- 2025 assassination of Iranian Supreme Court judges
- Judicial system of the Islamic Republic of Iran
- Supreme Court
