= List of members in the Second Term of the Assembly of Experts =

The List of members from the second term of the Assembly of Experts. (Persian: فهرست نمایندگان دوره دوم مجلس خبرگان رهبری, romanized: Fehreste nâmâyandegân dore dovom majles-e khobregân-e rahbari) consists of names of the members during the second term of the Assembly of Experts from 1990 to 1998. Elections for the Assembly of Experts occurs every 8 years.

"Assembly of experts (of the Leadership)", or the "Council of Experts" is the deliberative body empowered to appoint and dismiss the Supreme Leader of Iran; and Seyyed Ali Khamenei is the current supreme leader of Iran. Ali Khamenei was the Leader during this term.

The elections took place on 8 October 1990, with the Inauguration occurring on 20 February 1991.

== Members ==
The list is ordered Alphabetically.

Members with * next to their name, indicates they died while in office.

- Bushehr
1. Abdul-Nabi Namazi
- Chaharmahal and Bakhtiari
1. Ebrahim Amini
- East Azerbaijan
1. Ali Orumian
2. Khalil Boyukzadeh
3. Mohammad Ali Haghi – (محمد علی حقی) * (14 January 1999)
4. Mohsen Mojtahed Shabestari
5. Morteza Bani Fazel – (مرتضی بنی فضل)
6. Moslem Malakouti
7. Seyed Abolfazl Mousavi Tabrizi
- Fars
1. Ali Sheikh Mohad – (علی شیخ مهدی)
2. Assad-Allah Imani
3. Mohiyeddin Haeri-Shirazi
4. Seyed Mohammad Faghie
5. Seyed Mohammad Hossein Hosseini Arsanjani – (سید محمدحسین حسینی ارسنجانی)
- Gilan
1. Abbas Mahfouzi
2. Mokhtar Aminian
3. Mohammad Ali Faiz Lahiji Gilani
4. Zaynolabideen Ghorbani
- Hamadan
1. Ahmad Saberi Hamadani
2. Seyed Abolhassan Mousavi Hamadani – (سید ابوالحسن موسوی همدانی)
- Hormozgan
1. Mirza Ahmad Anvari
- Ilam
1. Ghorbanali Dorri-Najafabadi
- Isfahan
1. Hossein Mazaheri
2. Jalal Al-Din Taheri
3. Morteza Moghtadai
4. Seyed Esmail Hashemi – (سید اسماعیل هاشمی)
5. Seyed Mahdi Yasrebi
- Kerman
1. Ali Movahedi-Kermani
2. Mohammad Javad Hojati Kermani
3. Mohialdin Fazel Harandi
- Kermanshah
1. Mohammad Reza Kazemi – (محمدرضا کاظمی)
2. Mojtaba Haj Akhund – (مجتبی حاج آخوند)
- Khorasan
1. Abbas Vaez-Tabasi
2. Abdol Javad Gharavian – (عبد الجواد غرویان)
3. Abolghasem Khazali
4. Abolhassan Moghaddasi Shirazi – (ابوالحسن مقدسی شیرازی)
5. Ali Akbar Alizadeh
6. Ali Asghar Masoumi Shahroudi
7. Esmail Ferdowspoor
8. Habibollah Mehman Navaz
- Khuzestan
1. Ahmad Jannati
2. Mohammad Ali Mousavi Jazayeri
3. Mohammad-Taqi Mesbah-Yazdi
4. Mohsen Araki
5. Seyyed Ali Shafiei
- Kohgiluyeh and Boyer-Ahmad
1. Seyed Karamatollah Malek-Hosseini
- Kurdistan
1. Mollah Abdollah Mohammadi * (1997)
2. Seyed Ali Hosseini – (سید علی حسینی)
- Lorestan
1. Seyed Hassan Taheri Khoramabadi
2. Seyed Mohammad Bagher Soltani
- Markazi
1. Abolfazl Khonsari – (ابوالفضل خوانساری)
2. Seyed Mahdi Rohani
- Mazandaran
1. Abdollah Javadi-Amoli
2. Esmail Salehi Mazandarani
3. Hadi Rohani
4. Hossein Mohammadi La'ini – (حسین محمدی لائینی)
5. Seyed Habibollah Taheri – (سید حبیب الله طاهری)
6. Seyed Kazem Noor Mofidi
7. Seyed Saber Jabbari
- Semnan
1. Mohammad Momen
- Sistan and Baluchestan
1. Mohammad Eshagh Madani
2. Seyed Mahdi Abadi – (سید مهدی عبادی)
- Tehran
1. Ahmad Azari Qomi
2. Ahmad Khomeini * (17 March 1995)
3. Akbar Hashemi Rafsanjani
4. Ali Meshkini
5. Gholamreza Rezvani
6. Hadi Khosroshahi
7. Hossein Rasti Kashani
8. Mohammad Bagher Bagheri Kani
9. Mohammad Bagher Mohialdin Anvari
10. Mohammed Emami-Kashani
11. Mohammad Mohammadi Gilani
12. Mohammad Reyshahri
13. Mohammad Yazdi
14. Mohsen Kharazi
15. Seyed Hashem Rasoli Mahallati
16. Seyed Mohammad Bagher Asadi Khonsari – (سید محمد باقر اسدی خوانساری)
- West Azerbaijan
1. Ali Akbar Ghoreishi
2. Ali Ahmadi Mianji
3. Mohammad Sadegh Najmi
- Yazd
1. Seyed Abbas Khatam Yazdi – (سید عباس خاتم یزدی)
- Zanjan
1. Hadi Barikbin
2. Seyed Esmaeil Mousavi Zanjani
3. Seyed Hassan Mousavi Poor (Shali) – (سیدحسن موسوی پور (شالی))

== See also ==
- 1990 Iranian Assembly of Experts election
- Assembly of Experts
- List of members in the First Term of the Council of Experts
- List of members in the Third Term of the Council of Experts
- List of members in the Fourth Term of the Council of Experts
- List of members in the Fifth Term of the Council of Experts
- List of members in the Sixth Term of the Council of Experts
- List of chairmen of the Assembly of Experts
