= List of members in the Fifth Term of the Assembly of Experts =

The List of members from the fifth term of the Assembly of Experts. (Persian: فهرست نمایندگان دوره پنجم مجلس خبرگان رهبری, romanized: Fehreste nâmâyandegân dore panjom majles-e khobregân-e rahbari) consists of names of the members during the fifth and current term of the Assembly of Experts from 2016 to 2024. Elections for the Assembly of Experts occurs every 8 years.

"Assembly of experts (of the Leadership)", or the "Council of Experts" is the deliberative body empowered to appoint and dismiss the Supreme Leader of Iran; and Seyyed Ali Khamenei was the Supreme Leader of Iran until he was Assassinated in the end of February 2026 and was replaced by his son Mojtaba more than a week later.

The elections took place on 26 February 2016, with the Inauguration occurring on 24 May 2016.

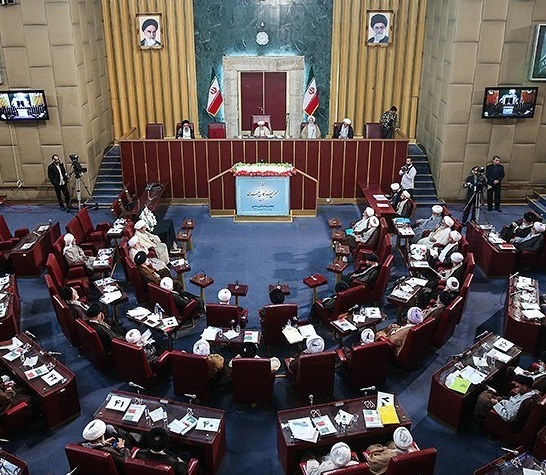
The sixth meeting of the members of the Assembly of Experts during the fifth term.

== Members ==
The list is ordered Alphabetically.

Members with * next to their name, indicates they died while in office.

- Alborz
1. Mohsen Kazeroni
2. Mahdi Mirbaqiri
- Ardabil
1. Seyed Fakhreddin Mousavi * (18 September 2021)
2. Hasan Amili
- Bushehr
1. Seyed Hashem Hosseini Bushehri
- Chaharmahal and Bakhtiari
1. Alireza Eslamian
- East Azerbaijan
1. Ali Malakouti
2. Hashem Hashemzadeh Herisi
3. Mohammad Feyz Sarabi * (11 April 2022)
4. Mohammad Taghi Pourmohammadi
5. Mohsen Mojtahed Shabestari * (17 November 2021)
- Fars
1. Ahmad Beheshti
2. Ali Akbar Kalantari
3. Assad-Allah Imani * (7 May 2018)
4. Lotfollah Dezhkam (Replaced Assad-Allah Imani in midterm election Feb 2020)
5. Seyed Ali Asghar Dastgheib
6. Seyed Mohammad Faghie * (22 March 2022)
- Gilan
1. Ahmad Parvaei Rik
2. Reza Ramezani Gilani
3. Seyed Ali Hosseini Ashkevari
4. Zaynolabideen Ghorbani
- Golestan
1. Seyed Abdol Hadi Hosseini Shahroudi
2. Seyed Kazem Nourmofidi
- Hamadan
1. Ghiaseddin Taha Mohammadi
2. Seyed Mostafa Mousavi Faraz
- Hormozgan
1. Seyed Ruhollah Sadr Al-Sadati
- Ilam
1. Seyed Mohsen Saeedi Golpaygani
- Isfahan
1. Abdol Mohammad Abdolahi
2. Abdul-Nabi Namazi * (28 January 2024)
3. Morteza Moghtadai
4. Seyed Abolhasan Mahdavi
5. Seyed Yousef Tabatabai Nejad
- Kerman
1. Ahmad Khatami
2. Aman-Allah Alimoradi
3. Mohammad Bahrami Khoshkar
- Kermanshah
1. Aman Narimani
2. Mohammad Mohammadi Araghi
- Khuzestan
1. Abbas Ka'bi
2. Abdul Karim Farhani
3. Mohammad Hossein Ahmadi Shahroudi
4. Mohsen Heidari Alekasir
5. Seyed Ali Shafiei
6. Seyed Mohammad Ali Mousavi Jazayeri
- Kohgiluyeh and Boyer-Ahmad
1. Seyed Sharaf Aldin Malek Hosseini
- Kurdistan
1. Faegh Rostami
2. Seyed Mohammad Hosseini Shahroudi
- Lorestan
1. Ahmad Moballeghi
2. Hashem Niazi
- Markazi
1. Ahmad Mohseni Garakani
2. Mohsen Araki
- Mazandaran
1. Ali Moalemi
2. Norallah Tabresi * (8 February 2020)
3. Sadiq Larijani
4. Seyed Rahim Tavakol
5. Seyed Sadegh Pishnamazi – (سید صادق پیشنمازی) (Replaced Norallah Tabresi in second midterm election in June 2021)
- North Khorasan
1. Gholamreza Fayazi (Replaced Habiollah Mehman Navaz in midterm election Feb 2020)
2. Habibollah Mehman Navaz * (22 April 2018)
- Qazvin
1. Ali Eslami (cleric)
2. Majid Talkhabi
- Qom
1. Mohammad Momen * (21 February 2019)
2. Mohammad Yazdi (Replaced Mohammad Momen in midterm elections Feb 2020) * (9 December 2020)
3. Seyed Mohammad Saeedi (Replaced Mohammad Yazdi in second midterm elections in June 2021)
- Razavi Khorasan
1. Hassan Alemi
2. Mohammad-Hadi Abdekhodaei
3. Mohammad-Taqi Mesbah-Yazdi (Replaced Seyed Mahmoud Hashemi Shahroudi in midterm election Feb 2020) * (1 January 2021)
4. Seyed Ahmad Alamolhoda
5. Seyed Ahmad Hosseini Khorasani
6. Seyed Mahmoud Hashemi Shahroudi * (24 December 2018)
7. Seyed Mohammad-Reza Modarresi Yazdi (Replaced Mohammad-Taqi Mesbah-Yazdi in the second midterm elections in June 2021)
8. Seyed Mojtaba Hosseini
- Semnan
1. Seyed Mohammad Shahcheraghi
- Sistan and Baluchestan
1. Abbas-Ali Soleimani * (26 April 2023)
2. Ali Ahmad Salami
- South Khorasan
1. Seyed Ebrahim Raisi
- Tehran
1. Abbas Ali Akhtari (Replaced Nasrallah Shah Abadi in midterm elections in Feb 2020) * (31 October 2022)
2. Alireza Arafi (Replaced Seyed Hashem Bathaie Golpayegani in second midterm elections in June 2021)
3. Ahmad Daneshzadeh Momen – (احمد دانشزاده مؤمن) (Replaced Mohammad-Ali Taskhiri in second midterm elections in June 2021)
4. Ahmad Jannati
5. Akbar Hashemi Rafsanjani * (8 January 2017)
6. Ali Momen Poor (Replaced Akbar Hashemi Rafsanjani in midterm elections in Feb 2020)
7. Ali Movahedi-Kermani
8. Ebrahim Amini * (24 April 2020)
9. Gholamreza Mesbahi-Moghaddam (Replaced Seyed Abolfazel Mir Mohammadi in midterm elections in Feb 2020)
10. Ghorbanali Dorri-Najafabadi
11. Hassan Rouhani
12. Hossein Ali Saadi (Replaced Ebrahim Amini in second midterm elections in June 2021)
13. Mohammad-Ali Taskhiri * (18 August 2020)
14. Mohammed Emami-Kashani * (2 March 2024)
15. Mohammad Hassan Zali
16. Mohammad Reyshahri * (21 March 2022)
17. Mohsen Esmaeili (First non-Mujtahid to be elected in Assembly of Experts)
18. Mohsen Qomi
19. Nasrallah Shah Abadi * (12 March 2018)
20. Seyed Abolfazel Mir Mohammadi * (24 November 2019)
21. Seyed Hashem Bathaie Golpayegani * (16 March 2020)
22. Seyed Mahmoud Alavi
- West Azerbaijan
1. Asghar Dirbaz
2. Javad Mojtahed Shabestari
3. Seyed Ali Akbar Ghoreishi
- Yazd
1. Abolghasem Wafi Yazdi
- Zanjan
1. Mohammad Haji Abolqasem Doulabi

== See also ==
- List of chairmen of the Assembly of Experts
- 2016 Iranian Assembly of Experts election
- Results of the 2016 Iranian Assembly of Experts election
- List of members in the First Term of the Council of Experts
- List of members in the Second Term of the Council of Experts
- List of members in the Third Term of the Council of Experts
- List of members in the Fourth Term of the Council of Experts
- List of members in the Sixth Term of the Council of Experts
