= 1982 Iranian Assembly of Experts election in Tehran province =

The first elections for the Assembly of Experts in Tehran Province was held on 10 December 1982 to elect 14 representatives in the constituency. Only 17 candidates –all Khomeinists– competed for the seats, of whom 13 were unanimously endorsed by the Combatant Clergy Association, the Society of Seminary Teachers of Qom and the Islamic Propagation Office of Qom Seminary.

The voter turnout was declared 71.85% in the constituency.

== Results ==
#	Candidate	Electoral list(s)			Votes	%	Notes
#	Candidate	CCA	SST	IPO	Votes	%	Notes
1	Ali Khamenei	check	check	check	2,800,353	87.80	Elected
2	Akbar Hashemi Rafsanjani	check	check	check	2,675,008	83.87	Elected
3	Abdolkarim Mousavi Ardebili	check	check	check	2,457,890	77.06	Elected
4	Ali Meshkini	check	check	check	2,414,247	75.69	Elected
5	Mohammad Emami-Kashani	check	check	check	2,346,865	73.58	Elected
6	Mohammad Mohammadi-Gilani	check	check	check	2,129,562	66.77	Elected
7	Yousef Sanei	check	check	check	2,073,572	65.01	Elected
8	Mohammad Baqer Baqeri	check	check	check	2,026,284	63.53	Elected
9	Mohammad-Bagher Asadi Khonsari	check	check	check	1,965,831	61.63	Elected
10	Gholamreza Rezvani	check	check	check	1,939,725	60.81	Elected
11	Ahmad Azari Qomi	check	check	check	1,915,852	60.07	Elected
12	Hadi Khosrowshahi	check	check		1,743,521	54.66	Elected
13	Hossein Rasti Kashani	check	check	check	1,721,210	53.96	Elected
14	Majid Mohajeri Iravani	check	check	check	1,585,662	49.71	Run-off
15	Sadegh Khalkhali				1,048,284	32.87	Run-off
16	Mohammad Reyshahri			check	900,556	28.23	Defeated
17	Gholam-Hossein Haghi				298,754	9.36	Defeated
Blank/Invalid Votes					126,112	3.95	
Total Votes					3,189,530	100	
Source: Results via mashreghnews.ir
