= List of members in the First Term of the Assembly of Experts =

The List of members from the first term of the Assembly of Experts. (Persian: فهرست نمایندگان دوره نخست مجلس خبرگان رهبری, romanized: Fehreste nâmâyandegân dore nakhost majles-e khobregân-e rahbari) consists of names of the members during the first term of the Assembly of Experts from 1982 to 1990. Elections for the Assembly of Experts occurs every 8 years.

"Assembly of experts (of the Leadership)", or the "Council of Experts" is the deliberative body empowered to appoint and dismiss the Supreme Leader of Iran; there has been a vacancy in the position since Seyyed Ali Khamenei's death on 28 February 2026. Ruhollah Khomeini was the supreme leader of Iran during this term.

The elections took place on 10 December 1982, with the Inauguration occurring on 14 July 1983.

== Members ==
The list is ordered Alphabetically.

Members with * next to their name, indicates they died while in office.

- Bushehr
1. Mirza Ibrahim Jamal Yousefi Dashti
- Chaharmahal and Bakhtiari
1. Ebrahim Amini
- East Azerbaijan
1. Abdol Hossein Tabrizi Gharavi – (عبد الحسین تبریزی غروی)
2. Hibat Allah Yektai – (هبت الله یکتایی)
3. Khalil Boyukzadeh
4. Mohsen Mojtahed Shabestari
5. Moslem Malakouti
6. Seyed Abolfazl Mousavi Tabrizi
7. Seyed Mohsen Mousavi Tabrizi
- Fars
1. Ali Mohammad Dastgheib Shirazi
2. Assad-Allah Imani
3. Mohiyeddin Haeri-Shirazi
4. Mohiyeddin Fazel Harandi
5. Seyed Ali Asghar Dastgheib
- Gilan
1. Abbas Mahfouzi
2. Mohammad Ali Faiz Lahiji Gilani
3. Mokhtar Aminian
4. Sadeq Ehsanbakhsh
- Hamadan
1. Hossein Noori Hamedani
2. Mohammad Baqer Anvari
- Hormozgan
1. Mirza Ahmad Anvari
- Ilam
1. Abdul Rahman Heidari Ilami * (1 January 1987)
- Isfahan
1. Abbas Izadi * – (عباس لیزادی)
2. Jalal Al-Din Taheri
3. Seyed Mahdi Yasrebi
4. Seyed Mohammad Hosseini (Kashani) – (سید محمد حسینی (کاشانی))
- Kerman
1. Ali Movahedi-Kermani
2. Mohammad Hashemian
3. Morteza Fahim
- Kermanshah
1. Mohammad Hossein Zarandi
2. Mojtaba Haj Akhund – (مجتبی حاج آخوند)
- Khorasan
1. Abbas Vaez-Tabasi
2. Abolghasem Khazali
3. Abolhassan Moqdasi Shirazi – (ابوالحسن مقدسی شیرازی)
4. Abdul Javad Gharavian – (عبد الجواد غرویان)
5. Ali Akbar Eslami Torabti – (علی اکبر اسلامی تربتی)
6. Ali Asghar Masoumi Shahroudi
7. Esmail Ferdowspoor
8. Mohammad Mahdi Rabbani Amalshi * (8 July 1985)
9. Mohammad Vaez-Abaei
- Khuzestan
1. Ahmad Jannati
2. Gholam Hossein Jami – (غلامحسین جامی)
3. Hassan Hemmati – (حسن همتی)
4. Hossein Mohammad Mojtahedi – (حسین محمد مجتهدی)
5. Seyed Mohammad Ali Mousavi Jazayeri
- Kohgiluyeh and Boyer-Ahmad
1. Ghorban Ali Shahmiri – (قربانعلی شهمیری)
- Kurdistan
1. Mollah Abdollah Mohammadi
2. Seyed Ali Hosseini – (سید علی حسینی)
- Lorestan
1. Seyed Hassan Taheri Khoramabadi
2. Seyed Mohammad Bagher Soltani
- Markazi
1. Jalal Taher Shamsi (Golpaygani)
2. Mohammad Fazel Lankarani
3. Seyed Mahdi Rohani
- Mazandaran
1. Abdollah Javadi-Amoli
2. Esmail Salehi Mazandarani
3. Hadi Rohani
4. Hossein Mohammadi La'ini – (حسین محمدی لائینی)
5. Seyed Jafar Karimi Divkalai
6. Seyed Kazem Noor Mofidi
- Semnan
1. Mohammad Momen
- Sistan and Baluchestan
1. Mohammad Eshagh Madani
2. Seyed Mahdi Abadi – (سید مهدی عبادی)
- Tehran
1. Ahmad Azari Qomi
2. Akbar Hashemi Rafsanjani
3. Ali Meshkini
4. Gholamreza Rezvani
5. Hossein Rasti Kashani
6. Mohammad Baqer Baqeri Kani
7. Mohammad Mohammadi Gilani
8. Mohammed Emami-Kashani
9. Sadegh Khalkhali
10. Seyed Abdul-Karim Mousavi Ardebili
11. Seyed Ali Khamenei
12. Seyed Hadi Khosroshahi
13. Seyed Mohammad Baqer Asadi Khonsari – (سید محمد باقر اسدی خوانساری)
14. Yousef Saanei
- West Azerbaijan
1. Ali Ahmadi Mianji
2. Morteza Bani Fazel – (مرتضی بنی فضل)
3. Seyed Ali Akbar Ghoreishi
- Yazd
1. Seyed Ruhollah Khatami * (27 October 1988)
- Zanjan
1. Hadi Barikbin
2. Seyed Mohammad Mousavi Khoeiniha
3. Seyed Esmaeil Mousavi Zanjani

== See also ==
- 1982 Iranian Assembly of Experts election
- Assembly of Experts
- List of members in the Second Term of the Council of Experts
- List of members in the Third Term of the Council of Experts
- List of members in the Fourth Term of the Council of Experts
- List of members in the Fifth Term of the Council of Experts
- List of members in the Sixth Term of the Council of Experts
- List of chairmen of the Assembly of Experts
