= 1998 Iranian Assembly of Experts election =

3rd Iranian Assembly of Experts election

1998 Assembly of Experts election
← 1990	October 23, 1998	2006 →

86 Seats in Assembly of Experts 56 seats needed for a majority
- Registered: 38,570,597
- Turnout: 46.30%
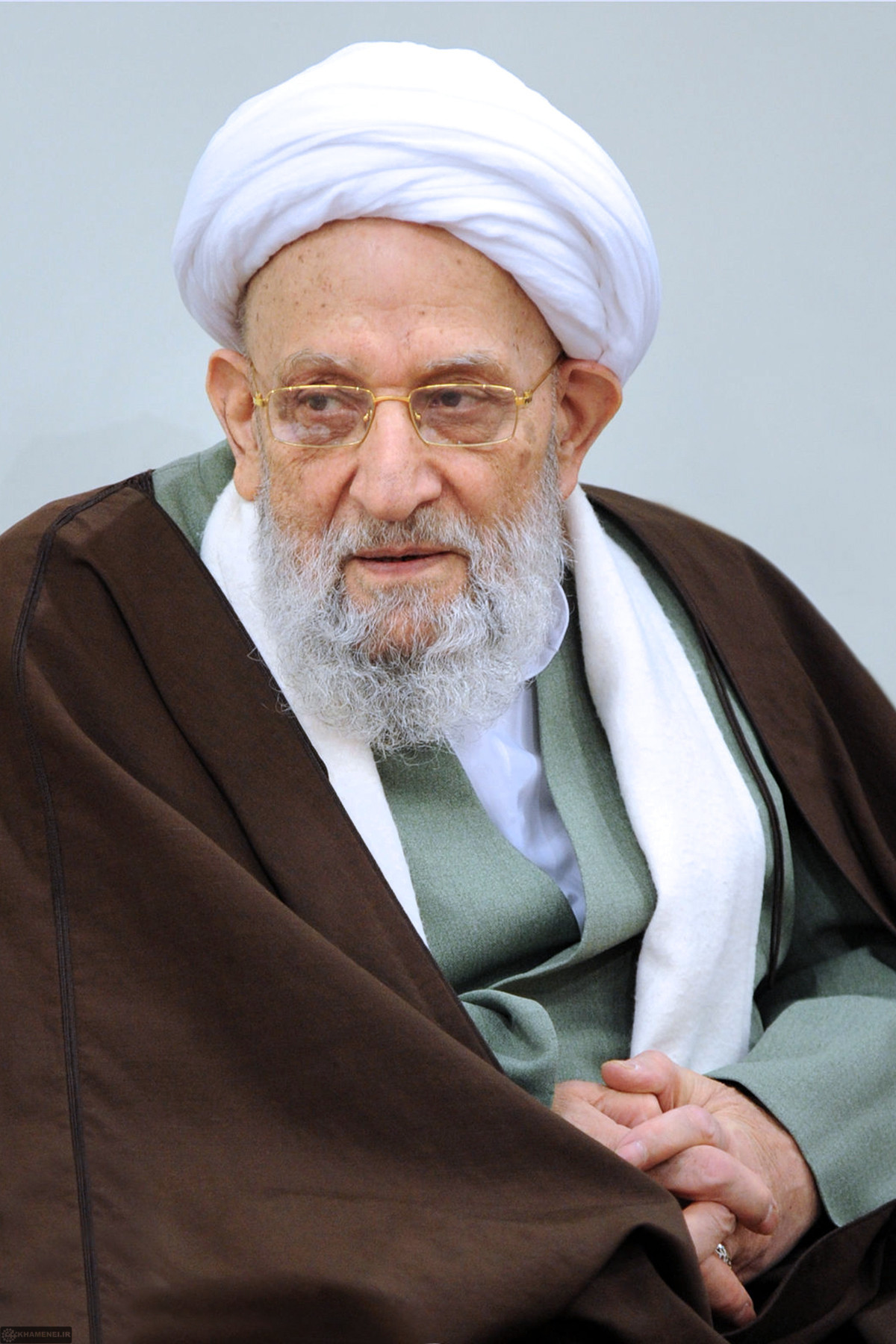

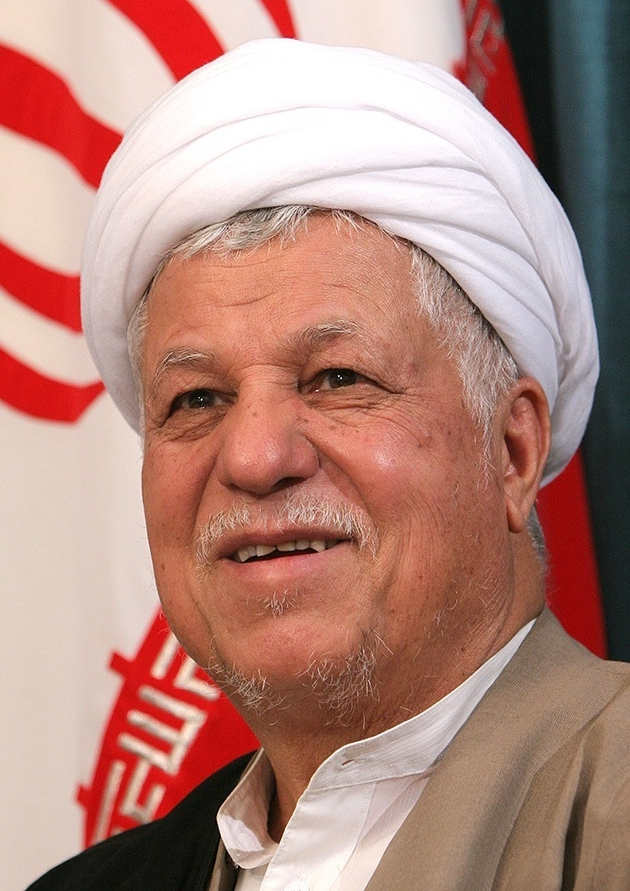
	Majority party	Minority party
Leader	Mohammad-Reza Mahdavi Kani	Akbar Hashemi Rafsanjani (Spiritual)
Party	Combatant Clergy Association	Executives of Construction Party
Seats won	69; 49+20	32; 12+20
Percentage	80.23%	37.20%
- Composition of the Assembly following the election. Members endorsed by both electoral lists are shown in dark gray.
Chairman before election
Ali Meshkini
Conservatives
Elected Chairman
Ali Meshkini
Conservatives

The third Iranian Assembly of Experts election was held on October 23, 1998 to elect all 86 members in 28 constituencies. 17,857,869 citizens voted in the elections, marking a 46.3% turnout.

Coming a year after reformist Mohammad Khatami's 1997 presidential victory, there had been speculation that reform-minded individuals would do well in the 1998 race. However, the Guardian Council changed the rules. Previously, candidates had to demonstrate ijtihad, but in 1998 all potential candidates were also required to demonstrate a "proper political inclination".

Out of 396 individuals registered to run, 167 (36.86%) were qualified by the council. 214 were disqualified, 13 withdrew and 60 of 187 invitees did not participate in ijtihad test.

The two leading clerical bodies of reformists, Association of Combatant Clerics and Assembly of Qom Seminary Scholars and Researchers did not issue any electoral list, protesting disqualification of their candidates by the Guardian Council. Other reformist groups did the same, including Mojahedin of the Islamic Revolution of Iran Organization. The only 2nd of Khordad-affiliated group that endorsed candidates was Executives of Construction Party.

== Results ==
According to Fars News Agency, the results were as follows:

Electoral list	Seats Won		
Electoral list	Exclusive	Shared	Total
Combatant Clergy Association	49	20	69 / 86 (80%)
Executives of Construction Party	12	20	32 / 86 (37%)
Independents	—		5 / 86 (6%)

According to Ali Afshari, the composition of assembly was:

Faction	Seats
'Traditional right-wingers'	65%
'Imam's Line'	19%
Independents	8%
'Rafsanjani allies'	5%
Radical-right and Fundamentalists	3%

== See also ==
- List of members in the Third Term of the Council of Experts
- Assembly of Experts
