= Hadi Rohani =

Iranian Ayatollah (1924–1999)

Ayatollah Sheikh Hadi Rohani

Representative of the Supreme Leader.
- In office 16 July 1979 – 13 October 1999
- Appointed by: Ruhollah Khomeini
- Preceded by: Office Created
- Succeeded by: Norallah Tabresi
- Constituency: Mazandaran Province

Friday Prayer Leader in Mazandaran
- In office 5 November 1979 – 13 October 1999
- Appointed by: Ruhollah Khomeini
- Preceded by: Office Created
- Succeeded by: Norallah Tabresi

Member of the First, Second, and Third terms of the Assembly of Experts.
- In office 10 December 1982 – 13 October 1999
- Preceded by: Office Created
- Succeeded by: Norallah Tabresi
- Constituency: Mazandaran Province
- شیخ حادی روحانی
- Title: Ayatollah

Personal life
- Born: 3 March 1924 Kalleh Bast, Sublime State of Iran
- Died: 13 October 1999 (aged 75) Babol, Iran
- Resting place: Ayatollah Rohani Library; 36.54948211936729°N 52.68075066360282°E
- Children: Hassan Rohani son
- Parent: Mullah Dost Mohammad (father)
- Education: Qom Hawza

Religious life
- Religion: Islam
- Jurisprudence: Twelver Shia Islam

Sheikh Hadi Rohani (Persian: شیخ حادی روحانی; 3 March 1924 – 13 October 1999) was an Iranian ayatollah. He represented the Supreme Leader of Iran for Mazandaran Province, as well as being the Friday Prayer Leader for Mazandaran. He also represented the people in Mazandaran for the first, second and third terms of the Assembly of Experts.

== Early life and background ==
Hadi Rohani was born in Kalleh Bast, Babolsar County, on 3 March 1924. He was born to a poor and religious family. His father, Mullah Dost Mohammad, was a well-known cleric who would often preach Islam, as well as being a farmer. His father died when Hadi was 5 years old, then his family was hit with major poverty. After the passing of father, he was forced to drop out of school when he was 10 to help provide for the family. He first started working alongside his mother on the farms. After some time, he worked in a bakery, as well as being a servant in the house of wealthy man in the area.

== Education ==
Hadi Rohani was fascinated in Islamic knowledge when he was a teenager, and finally, when he was 18 he started studying in the Maulana Babol Mosque under his relative Mullah Ibrahim Tavassoli. After learning the basics there, he pursued his Islamic studies in Khatam al-Anbia Seminary in Mazandaran. After the death of his little sister, and the removal of Reza Shah, he asked his mother in 1944 for permission to pursue his Islamic studies in Qom, which were granted. After two years of studying in Qom, he went to Mashhad to continue his studies, he was there for four years. While in Mashhad, he benefitted from being taught by Ayatollah Haj Sheikh Abdul Nabi Kojori Mazandarani and others. In 1950, he returned to Qom, to perfect his Islamic Studies in the Qom Seminary by doing advanced courses (Darse Kharej). Here, he reached the status of Ayatollah by gaining Ijtihad and perfecting his knowledge in Fiqh (Islamic Jurisprudence), Tafsir (Interpretation of Quran) and other subjects. While attending these advanced courses, he was taught by many. Some notable figures are, Hossein Borujerdi, Shahab ud-Din Mar'ashi Najafi, Ruhollah Khomeini, Abdol Javad Adib Nishabori, Musa al-Sadr, Mirza Ahmad Modares, Mirza Javad Aqa Tehrani, and Sheikh Abdol Hossein Faqihi Gilani (Rashti).

== Teachers ==
Hadi Rohani had many teachers on his journey to become an Ayatollah, here are some

1. Sheikh Abdul Nabi Kojori Mazandarani
2. Mirza Ahmad Modarres
3. Mirza Javad Agha Tehrani
4. Seyed Younes Ardabili
5. Sheikh Ali Akbar Nahavandi
6. Sheikh Kazem Damghani
7. Sheikh Gholam Hossein Tabrizi
8. Agha Hossein Faqih Sabzevari
9. Sheikh Abdol Javad Adib Nishabori
10. Seyed Shahab ud-Din Mar'ashi Najafi
11. Seyed Mohammad Baqer Soltani
12. Sheikh Hossein Ali Montazeri
13. Mirza Abolfazl Zahedi
14. Allama Seyed Muhammad Husayn Tabatabai
15. Sheikh Abdol Hossein Faqihi Gilani (Rashti)
16. Seyed Ruhollah Khomeini
17. Seyed Musa al-Sadr

== Political activities ==
After staying in Qom until 1964, Hadi Rohani went back to his hometown. While he was there, he was very active in his criticism of Mohammad Reza Pahlavi and the Pahlavi regime. This led to him being interrogated and harassed several times by SAVAK, which would lead to his eventual arrest. He was taken by SAVAK and interrogated on 20 August 1978, when they raided his home. He was sent to Tehran the same night. This led to protests around Babol County as the people were very fond of Hadi, with the pressure from the people, the Shah ordered for him to be released on 1 September 1978.

After the Iranian Revolution, Hadi Rohani spent the rest of his years being the Representative of the Supreme Leader of Iran, the Imam of Friday Prayer in Mazandaran, and he represented the people of Mazandaran in the Assembly of Experts. His first Friday of being the Imam occurred on 9 November 1979. He took his Friday prayers very seriously, and would attend even when he was ill. The last Friday Prayer he was the Imam of was on 27 April 1999.

== Works ==
Here are some of his many works

- Interpretation of Surah Hamd
- Resurrection in Islam
- A Look into the Issue of the Province.

== Death ==
Hadi Rohani died on 13 October 1999 in Babol. He was buried in the Ayatollah Rohani Library, next to the Khatam al-Anbiya (Sadr) Theological Seminary, the streets were full for his funeral. Ali Khamenei also sent a message of condolences after his death.

== See also ==
- List of members in the First Term of the Council of Experts
- List of members in the Second Term of the Council of Experts
- List of members in the Third Term of the Council of Experts
- List of ayatollahs
- List of provincial representatives appointed by Supreme Leader of Iran
- Ali Orumian
