= Hossein Rasti Kashani =

Iranian akhoond and theologian

Ayatollah Hossein Rasti Kashani
- حسین راستی کاشانی
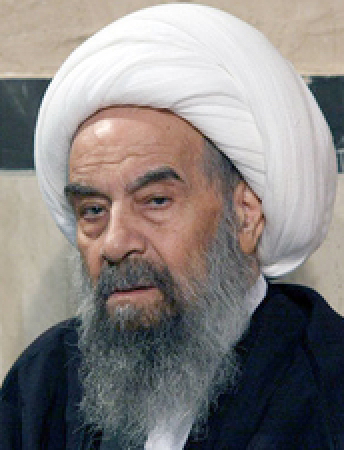
- Ayatollah Rasti Kashani

member of the Assembly of Experts
- In office 14 July 1983 – 22 February 1999
- Constituency: Tehran Province

Personal details
- Born: 1927 Kashan, Iran
- Died: 20 September 2017 (aged 89–90) Tehran

Hossein Rasti Kashani (Persian: حسین راستی کاشانی; 1927 in Kashan – 29 September 2017 in Tehran) was a member of the community of teachers of Qom seminary, and a member of the supreme council of Qom seminary. He was a member of the Assembly of Experts in its first and second terms, representing Tehran province.

== Biography ==
He is one of the clerics who went to Najaf years before the victory of the revolution after some seminary studies in Kashan and Qom. Following border disputes between Iran and Iraq during the time of the Shah, when some Iranians living in Iraq were expelled from there, he also came to Iran.

At the same time as he was studying, he was fighting against the Pahlavi government. He became a close ally of Khomeini and suspended his studies in Najaf in order to attend Ruhollah Khomeini's class. He also participated in the clerical sit-in at Tehran University in the last months of 1978. Following the Iranian Revolution he belonged to the radical camp. In 1979 he was appointed as the spiritual guide of Mojahedin of the Islamic Revolution Organization. He was also elected as member of the Assembly of Experts for the first term and elected again for the second term.
