= Mohammad-Bagher Bagheri Kani =

Iranian Ayatollah (born 1926)

- محمدباقر باقری کنی
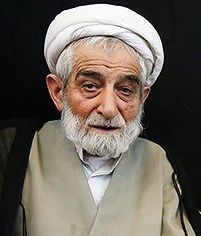
- Title: Ayatollah

Personal life
- Born: 1926 (age 99–100) Tehran, Imperial State of Iran
- Children: at least 2, including Ali Bagheri Kani
- Education: Qom Hawza
- Relatives: Mohammad-Reza Mahdavi Kani - Younger Brother

Religious life
- Religion: Islam
- Denomination: Twelwer Shi'a
- Jurisprudence: Ja'fari

Muslim leader
- Teacher: Hossein Borujerdi, Ruhollah Khomeini

Member of Assembly of Experts
- In office 10 December 1982 – 23 October 1998
- Constituency: Tehran
- In office 15 December 2006 – 26 February 2016
- Constituency: Tehran

Mohammad-Bagher Bagheri Kani (Persian: محمدباقر باقری کنی; born 1926) is an Iranian Shia Mujtahid. He was one of 82-86 Mujtahids to be elected in the First (1982), Second (1990), and Fourth (2006) terms in the Assembly of Experts.

== Life and education ==
Bagheri Kani was born in 1926, in Kan District, Tehran. He is the father of Ali Bagheri Kani and older brother of Mohammad-Reza Mahdavi Kani. He was taught Islamic jurisprudence and Interpretation of Quran under Ruhollah Khomeini, Hossein Borujerdi, Muhammad Husayn Tabataba'i, and Mohammad-Reza Golpaygani while attending his Islamic Studies in Qom Seminary. He was also the head of Imam Sadiq University from December 2014 to September 2015. One of his sons, Mesbah Bagheri Kani, was married to Hoda Khamenei, daughter of Iran's second Supreme Leader, Ali Khamenei. Initial reporting suggested the couple died during the assassination of Ali Khamenei in 2026, however later reports claimed it was only Mesbah who was killed.

== See also ==
- List of ayatollahs
- List of members in the Fifth Term of the Council of Experts
