= Ali Mohammad Dastgheib Shirazi =

Iranian Grand Ayatollah

Grand Ayatollah Sayyid Ali Mohammad Dastgheib Shirazi
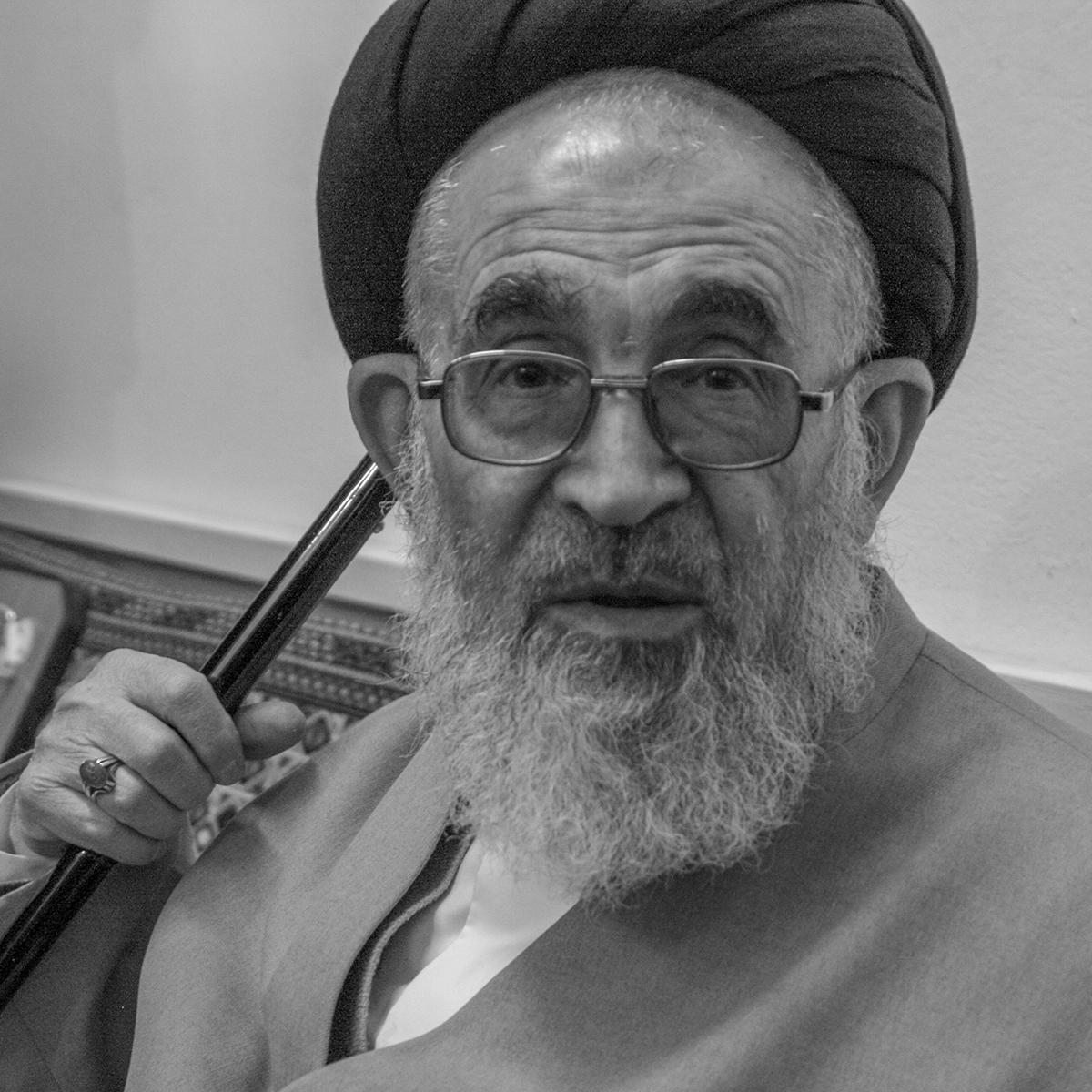
- Ayatollah Seyed Dastgheib Shirazi in a meeting with Ali Khamenei for the Assembly of Experts, 2007.

Personal life
- Born: 14 March 1935 (age 91) Shiraz, Iran
- Website: www.dastgheib.ir

Religious life
- Religion: Islam
- Denomination: Twelver Shia

Grand Ayatollah Sayyid Ali Mohammad Dastgheib Shirazi (Persian: السيد علی ‌محمد دستغیب شيرازي; born 14 March 1935) is an Iranian Twelver Shi'a marja'.

== Biography ==
Ayatollah Dastegheib has studied in seminaries of Qum, Iran under Grand Ayatollah Mohammad-Reza Golpaygani and Ayatollah Ruhollah Khomeini, and also in seminaries of Najaf, Iraq under Grand Ayatollah Abul-Qassim Khoei.

Dastgheib is member of the Assembly of Experts, the body charged with selecting and supervising Iran's supreme leader. He is also a prominent supporter of opposition leader Mir Hossein Mousavi.

== Ghoba Mosque issue ==
According to the news agency RFERL.org, the Iranian security forces closed the Ghoba Mosque" on January 2, 2010, and did not allow Friday prayers to take place. The Ghoba mosque in Shiraz which is one of the most important in the city, was closed with the aim of "silencing" Ayatollah Dastgheib, who is based there and who has "used the mosque as a platform to deliver sermons fiercely critical of the Islamic republic's current regime".

== Aiding Syrian Government ==
Dastgheib has reportedly questioned government strategy of aiding the Syrian government against protesters. During a 23 June 2011 Quranic interpretation session at the Qoba mosque in Shiraz, he urged that Iran's resources be saved for Iranians, and asking

“Where should the public wealth that could make this country one of the best in the world be spent? Should it be sent to Syria, so they can oppress the people?”

== See also ==
- List of maraji
- List of members in the First Term of the Council of Experts
