= Abbas-Ali Soleimani =

Iranian cleric (1947–2023)

- عباسعلی سلیمانی
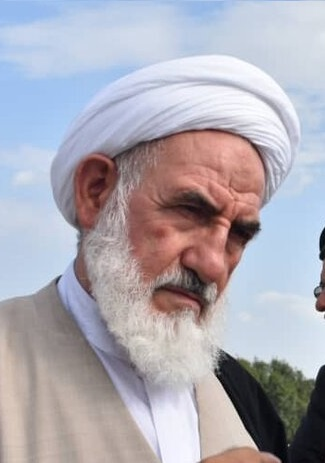

Representative of the Supreme Leader in Sistan and Baluchestan province and Friday Prayer Imam of Zahedan
- In office 2001–2018
- Appointed by: Ali Khamenei
- Succeeded by: Mostafa Mahami

Member of Assembly of experts in 4th and 5th terms from Sistan and Baluchestan province (majority vote)
- In office 2006–2023

Representative of the Supreme Leader in Kashan and Friday Prayer Imam of Kashan
- In office 2020–2022
- Appointed by: Ali Khamenei
- Preceded by: Abdul-Nabi Namazi
- Succeeded by: Saeed Hosseini

Personal details
- Born: 25 May 1947 Savadkuh, Mazandaran, Iran
- Died: 26 April 2023 (aged 75) Babolsar, Mazandaran, Iran
- Cause of death: Assassination by firearm
- Education: Qom Hawza

Abbas-Ali Soleimani (عباسعلی سلیمانی; 25 May 1947 – 26 April 2023) was an Iranian Shia cleric (ayatollah) and member of the Assembly of Experts.

He was murdered on April 26, 2023 at age 75.

== Life ==
Soleimani was born into a religious family in Savadkuh, Mazandaran, on 25 May 1947. He went to Kuttab at the age of 5. From age 12, he studied at a Hawzah in Qom and later in Behshahr. He continued his religious education in Mashhad.

Soleimani was appointed representative of Vali-e-Faqih and Imam of Friday Prayer in the city of Kashan. Later he was member of the Assembly of Experts.

== Death ==
Soleimani was shot and killed on 26 April 2023 in Mazandaran province. He was 75. The suspect was arrested by the Security Police for Soleimani's murder and later executed.

== See also ==
- List of provincial representatives appointed by Supreme Leader of Iran
