= Mahdi Hosseini Rohani =

Iranian Ayatollah (1925–2000)

Ayatollah Seyed Mahdi Hosseini Rohani
- آیت الله سید مهدی حسینی روحانی
- Ayatollah Mahdi Rohani at his home.

Member of the First and Second terms of the Assembly of Experts
- In office 10 December 1982 – 23 October 1998
- Preceded by: Office Created
- Succeeded by: Seyed Abolfazel Mir Mohammadi
- Constituency: Markazi Province

Member of the Third term of the Assembly of Experts
- In office 23 October 1998 – 23 November 2000
- Preceded by: Province Established in the Assembly of Experts
- Succeeded by: Mohammad Momen
- Constituency: Qom Province
- سید مهدی حسینی روحانی; Seyed Mahdi Hosseini Rohani
- Title: Ayatollah

Personal life
- Born: 15 July 1925 Qom
- Died: 23 November 2000 (aged 75) Qom
- Resting place: Fatima Masumeh Shrine; 34.6417°N 50.8790°E
- Children: Seyed Hadi Hosseini Rohani Son
- Parent: Seyed Abolhassan Rohani (father)
- Political party: Combatant Clergy Association; Society of Seminary Teachers of Qom
- Education: Qom Hawza
- Relatives: Mohammad Sadeq Rouhani Cousin; Mohammad Hosseini Rohani Cousin; Sheikh Mohammad Ali Shahabadi Son-in-Law

Religious life
- Religion: Islam
- Jurisprudence: Twelver Shia Islam

Seyed Mahdi Hosseini Rohani (Persian: سید مهدی حسینی روحانی; 15 July 1925 – 23 November 2000) was an Iranian Ayatollah born in Qom. He served in the First, Second, and Third terms of the Assembly of Experts.

== Family background ==
Mahdi Rohani was born into a very religious family. His father, Ayatollah Abdolhassan Rohani, was a scholar in Qom Seminary teaching Islam. His father was a prominent student of Abu l-Hasan al-Isfahani and Abdul-Karim Haeri Yazdi. His grandfather Ayatollah Sadeq Qomiye was a student of the great Murtadha al-Ansari. His mother is the daughter of Seyed Fakhreddin Qomiye and granddaughter of Mirza-ye Qomi.

He is also the cousin of Mohammad Sadeq Rouhani and Seyed Mohammad Hosseini Rohani, both of whom are Marja', otherwise known as Grand Ayatollah.

== Education ==
At an early age, Mahdi Rohani was being taught how to read and write Arabic by his father, as well as learning the Quran. He then attended Qom Seminary during his time in High School, where he would further his Islamic studies. At age 19, he decided to migrate to Najaf to attend Hawza Najaf. While there he had the benefit of being taught Faraid al-Usool by Mirza Hassan Yazdi, al-Makasib by Yahya Modaressi Yazdi, and Kefayat al-Usool by Mirza Baqer Zanjani.

Then in 1951 he migrated back to Qom where he mastered his levels of Islamic Knowledge and eventually reaching the level of Ijtihad to become a Faqīh. While in Qom he was taught by the likes of Ruhollah Khomeini, Seyyed Mohammad Hojjat Kooh Kamari, Hossein Borujerdi, Seyed Mohammad Mohaghegh Damad, Ahmad Khonsari and Muhammad Husayn Tabatabai. With the help of his teachers, he perfected his knowledge in Fiqh (Jurisprudence), Usool Fiqh (Principles of Islamic Jurisprudence), Islamic philosophy, Kalam (Islamic Theology) and Tafsir (Interpretation of Quran).

== Teachers ==
Over the years Mahdi Rohani had many teachers on his path to becoming a Mujtahid. Here is a few of them.

1. Seyed Morteza Alavi Faridani
2. Mirza Mohammad Ali Adib Tehrani
3. Jafar Sabouri Qomi
4. Abdolrazaaq Ghaeni
5. Mohammad Hosseini Ghaeni
6. Mirza Hassan Yazdi
7. Yahya Modaressi Yazdi
8. Mirza Baqer Zanjani
9. Mohammad-Taqi Bahjat Foumani
10. Ruhollah Khomeini
11. Seyyed Mohammad Hojjat Kooh Kamari
12. Hossein Borujerdi
13. Seyed Mohammad Mohaghegh Damad
14. Ahmad Khonsari
15. Muhammad Husayn Tabatabai

== Students ==
Mahdi Rohani also taught others when he was an Ayatollah. Here are some of his students:

1. Sadr al-Din Haeri Shirazi
2. Seyed Jafar Morteza Ameli
3. Seyed Morteza Morteza Ameli
4. Rasul Jafarian
5. Ali Safaei Haeri
6. Hossein Qatife
7. Seyed Ali Mir Sharifi
8. Mohammad Ali Bebar
9. Mohammad Javad Fazel Lankarani
10. Seyed Hadi Hosseini Rohani (His Son)
11. Sheikh Mohammad Ali Shahabadi (His Son-in-Law)

== Works ==
The following is a list of works either published, or unpublished.

1. The Evolution of The Salafi Sect - (Published in Arabic and Farsi)
2. Research and Discussion with Sunnis and Salafis - (Published in Arabic)
3. The Three Rakaat of Witr Prayer - (Published in Farsi and Arabic)
4. The Hadith of Ahlul Bayt (Peace be upon them) in Ahlul Sunnah - (Published in Arabic)
5. Tafsir (Interpretation) of Surah Fajr
6. Tafsir (Interpretation) of Surah Hamd
7. The History of the Different Sects in Islam
8. Lectures of Jurisprudence of Ayatollah Mohaghegh Damad
9. Notes on Jurisprudence
10. The Ash'ari Theology (part 1) (Published in Arabic)
11. The Ash'ari Theology (part 2) (Published in Arabic)
12. The Ash'ari Theology (part 3) (Published in Arabic)
13. A Treatise on Tajweed (Published in Farsi)
14. A Proposal to Determine the Exact Line for the Qibla (Published in Farsi)
15. The Origin of History, Hijri or Ad? (Published in Arabic)
16. The Fiqh and Fundamental Views of Sheikh Bahai (Published in Arabic)
17. An Introduction to the Book, "Sarr al-Sa'ada" (The Secret of Happiness) (Published in Arabic)

== Death ==
Ayatollah Mahdi Rohani died on Thursday, 23 November 2000 in Qom. He was buried next to his lifelong friend, Ayatollah Ahmadi Mianji in Fatima Masumeh Shrine. The prayers were led by Ayatollah Mohammad-Taqi Bahjat Foumani. Supreme Leader of Iran Ali Khamenei also sent a message of condolence on his passing.

== See also ==
- List of members in the First Term of the Council of Experts
- List of members in the Second Term of the Council of Experts
- List of members in the Third Term of the Council of Experts
- List of ayatollahs
- Karamatollah Malek-Hosseini
