= Abdul Rahman Heidari Ilami =

Iranian ayatollah (1925–1987)

- عبدالرحمن حیدری ایلامی
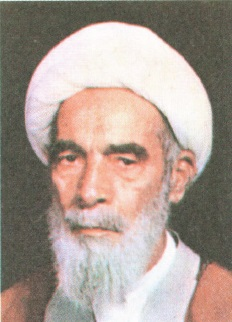
- Ayatollah Abdul Rahman Heidari Ilami in 1979.

Member of Assembly of Experts
- In office 10 December 1982 – 1 January 1987
- Preceded by: Office Began
- Succeeded by: Ghorbanali Dorri-Najafabadi
- Constituency: Ilam Province

Personal details
- Born: 1925 Ilam, Iran
- Died: 1 January 1987 (aged 61–62) Qom, Iran
- Resting place: Fatima Masumeh Shrine

Ayatollah Abdul Rahman Heidari Ilami (1925 – 1 January 1987) (Persian: آیت الله عبدالرحمن حیدری ایلامی) (Note: Kurdish: ئایەتوڵڵا عەبدولڕەحمان حەیدەری ئیلامی) was an Iranian Muslim scholar and member of the first term of the Assembly of Experts in Iran. He organised popular resistance to Iraq's invasion of Iran.

Ayatollah Heidari was a representative of Ayatollah Khomeini in Ilam Province in the Assembly of Experts. He established himself as a conservative thinker with his comments regarding the rule of the supreme leader and statements generally against liberal ideology.

Heidari died in 1986. His body was buried near the shrine of Fātimah bint Mūsā.

== See also ==
- List of members in the First Term of the Council of Experts
- List of ayatollahs
