= Mostafa Mousavi Faraz =

Iranian Ayatollah

Ayatollah; Seyyed; Mostafa Mousavi Faraz
- مصطفی موسوی فراز
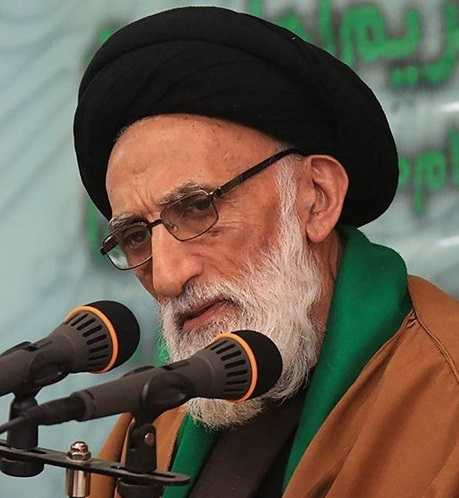

Member of the Assembly of Experts
- Incumbent
- Assumed office 2016
- Constituency: Hamadan

Personal details
- Born: 1944 (age 81–82) Isfahan, Imperial State of Iran
- Party: Society of Seminary Teachers of Qom

Ayatollah Seyyed Mostafa Mousavi Faraz (Persian: سید مصطفی موسوی فراز) (also known as Seyyed Mostafa Mousavi Esfahani), is an Iranian Twelver Shia ayatollah who was born in 1944 in Isfahan to a religious family. This Shia cleric has been a member of the Assembly of Experts (from Hamedan province) following the February 2016 election.

Mousavi Faraz's father was Seyyed-Akbar Havaei, who was a draper who encouraged his son to go to a hawzah. He commenced his seminary education before finishing elementary school at the age of 14. He studied for three years in Isfahan Hawzah. Later he went to Qom seminary.

== Teachers ==
His teachers included:

- Abdul-Ali Arab
- Mostafa Beheshti
- Morteza Haeri
- Makarem Shirazi
- Mohammad-Reza Golpaygani
- Jawad Tabrizi

== See also ==
- List of members of Experts Assembly
- List of ayatollahs
