= Mohammad Va'ez Abaee-Khorasani =

Iranian Islamic cleric and politician (1940–2004)

Ayatollah Mohammad Va'ez Abaee-Khorasani
- محمد واعظ عبایی خراسانی

Mashhad Representative in the Majlis of Iran
- In office 2000–2004

Khorasan province Representative in the Assembly of Experts
- In office 1983–1991

Personal details
- Born: 1940 Mashhad, Razavi Khorasan, Iran
- Died: October 13, 2004 (aged 63–64) Tehran, Iran
- Resting place: Fatima Masumeh Shrine, Qum

Ayatollah Mohammad Va'ez Abaee-Khorasani (1940, Mashhad - October 13, 2004, Tehran) was an Iranian cleric and reformist politician. He was a representative of Mashhad in the Majlis of Iran from 2000 to 2004.

== Early life ==
Born in Mashhad in a religious family, he studied Islamic sciences in Mashhad and then moved to Qom to continue his studies there. Because of his religious-political speeches, he was arrested by the Pahlavi government twice, the first time in 1972 when he was sentenced to a short jail time. But the second time, in 1973, he was exiled to Bandar Deylam and Nain for three years. Abaee-Khorasani restarted his political speeches in 1976, with other cleric colleagues of his, especially Sadegh Khalkhali, Mehdi Karroubi, and Mohammad Mousavi-Khoiniha.

== Career ==
After the Iranian Revolution, Abaee-Khorasani's first governmental post was as the Sharia ruler in Ahwaz. Shortly after, he moved back to Qom to head the provincial branch of the Organization for Islamic Evangelization (saazmaan-e tablighaat-e eslaami), which sent clerics to the whole country for speeches during the holy Shi'a months of Muharram, Safar, and Ramadan, and also published periodicals, which sometimes contained critiques of extremist or conservative factions of the hawza.

While keeping the position in Qom, Abaee-Khorasani moved to Mashhad and was one of the Friday prayer Imams of the city for ten years, where he escaped an unsuccessful assassination attempt in 1994. He also represented the Khorasan province in the first Assembly of Experts.

Abaee-Khorasani moved to Qom again as the head of Mohammad Khatami's presidential campaign office in the city of Qom. The Qom campaign led to about 70% of the people of the city voting for the reformist Khatami, which was unexpected because of the supposedly conservative leanings of the citizens of the city. The local campaign team later became the founding members of the Society of Scholars and Teachers of Qom's Hawza (majma'-e mohaghgheghin va modarresin-e howze-ye elmiyye-ye ghom), the political organization of reformist clerics of the city.

When Khatami became president in 1997, he appointed Abaee-Khorasani as one of his advisors. Later, he was elected in 2000 in the parliamentary elections to represent the city of Mashhad, his birthplace, in the Majlis of Iran. He collected the most votes in the city. During his term there, he participated in the reformist candidates' sit-in in early 2004, amid his old blood and kidney disease. He also participated in the symbolic mass resignation of more than a hundred colleagues from the sixth Islamic Consultative Assembly.

== Death ==
After a long physical illness, Abaee-Khorasani died on October 13, 2004, in the Khatam ol-Anbia Hospital. On October 16, he was buried in Qom, near the shrine of Fatima bint Musa ibn Jafar, the daughter of the seventh Shia Imam.
