= Mohammad Faghie =

Iranian Ayatollah (1942-2022)

Ayatollah Seyed Mohammad Faghie
- آیت الله سید محمد فقیه
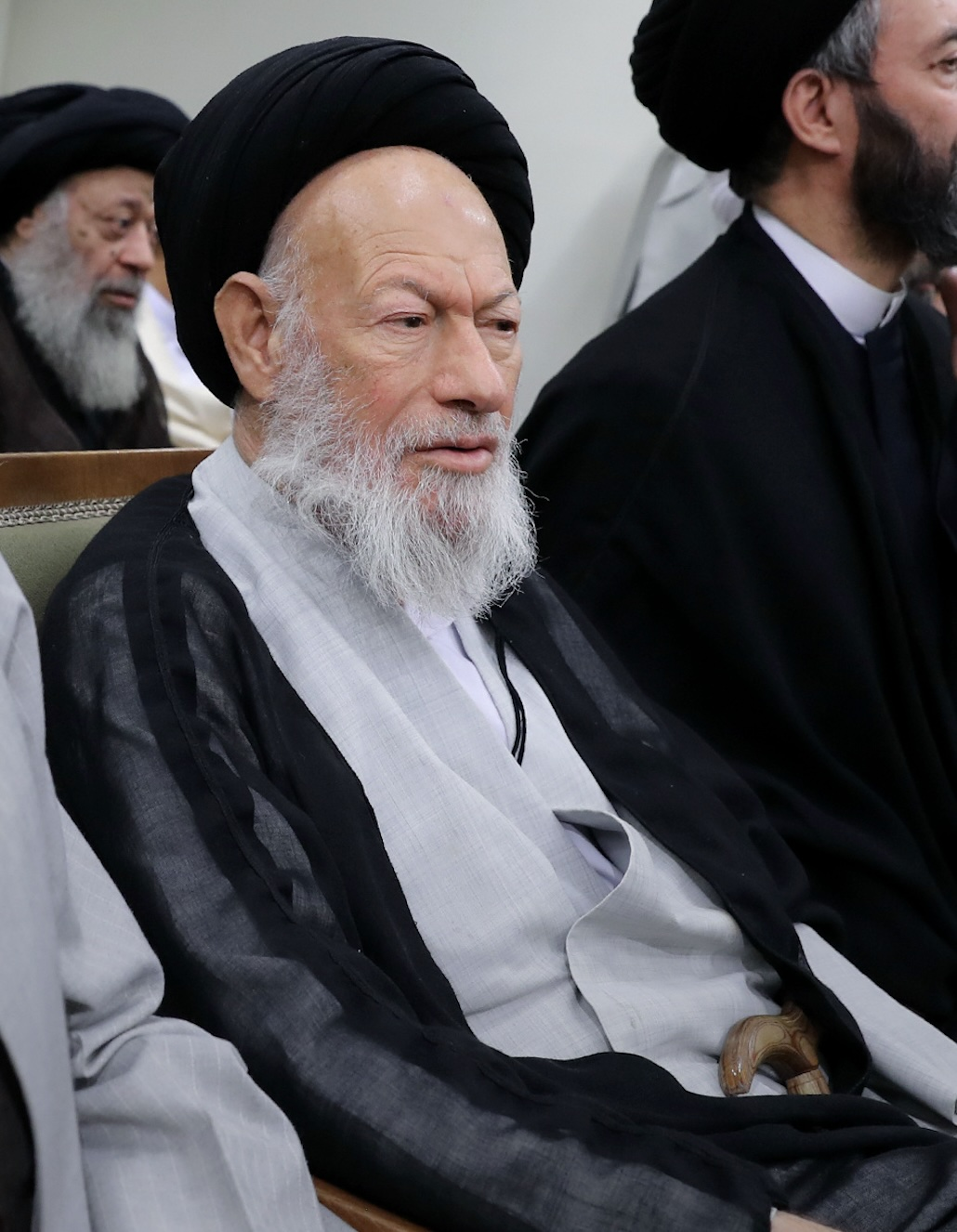
- Ayatollah Seyed Mohammad Faghie meeting in the house of Ali Khamenei with the members of the Assembly of Experts, 2019.

Friday Prayer leader of Neyriz
- In office 1979 – 22 March 2022
- Appointed by: Ruhollah Khomeini

Member of the Second term of the Assembly of Experts.
- In office 20 February 1991 – 22 February 1999
- Constituency: Fars province

Member of the Fifth term of the Assembly of Experts.
- In office 24 May 2016 – 22 March 2022
- Constituency: Fars province
- Majority: 560,614 (26.05%)
- محمد فقیه; Mohammad Faghie
- Title: Ayatollah

Personal life
- Born: 10 April 1942 Neyriz, Imperial State of Iran
- Died: 22 March 2022 (aged 79) Shiraz, Iran
- Education: Qom Hawza

Religious life
- Religion: Islam
- Jurisprudence: Twelver Shia Islam

Seyed Mohammad Faghie (Persian: سید محمد فقیه; born 10 April 1942) was an Iranian Ayatollah. He was chosen by Ruhollah Khomeini as the Imam of Friday Prayer in Neyriz from the Iranian revolution until his death. He represented the people of Fars province in the Assembly of Experts in the second and fifth terms. He died while in office during the fifth term.

== See also ==
- List of ayatollahs
- List of members in the Second Term of the Council of Experts
- List of members in the Fifth Term of the Council of Experts
