= Seyed Mojtaba Hosseini =

Iranian Ayatollah

Ayatollah; Seyyed; Mojtaba Hosseini
- سید مجتبی حسینی
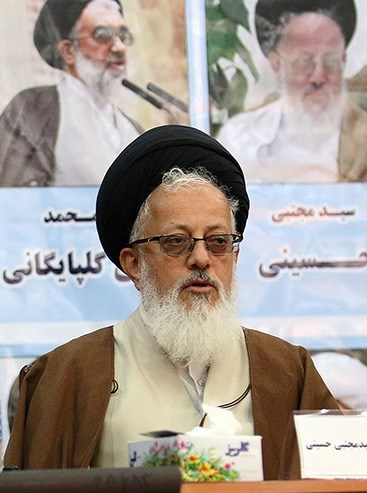

Member of the Assembly of Experts
- Incumbent
- Assumed office 24 May 2016
- Constituency: Razavi Khorasan Province
- In office 23 February 1999 – 20 February 2007
- Constituency: Sistan and Baluchestan Province

Personal details
- Born: 1954 (age 71–72) Mashhad, Iran

Seyyed Mojtaba Hosseini (Persian: سید مجتبی حسینی) (Born 1954 in Mashhad) (Persian: مشهد) is a member of the Assembly of Experts (third, fifth and sixth period ) and the supreme leader's representative in Iraq and Syria.

== Biography ==
Seyed Mojtaba Hosseini family-Sistani was born in Mashhad and a clerical family. His father, Syed Jalil Hosseini of clerics in Mashhad during the Pahlavi regime after accepting the invitation of the government during a meeting with Mohammad Reza Pahlavi, prayer in the mosque Goharshad for his ban and then in the mosque Tehranis resident of Mashhad to bring the congregation to pay. Syed Jalil Hosseini Seyed Mojtaba father as a teenager to study theology in Mashhad migration of our city and in the presence of Mirza Mehdi Esfahani was the degree of ijtihad.

== Professors ==
- Abbas Vaez-Tabasi
- Abolghasem Khazali
- Morteza Motahhari
- Mohammad-Reza Golpaygani
- Jawad Tabrizi
- Hossein Vahid Khorasani

== Records ==
At the same time in 1997, he taught at the seminary and university for seven years, and was a representative of the Sunni leadership in the Sistan-Baluchistan province. He then served as the representative of the Syrian leadership that this period coincides with the recent crises in Syria and Lebanon. After the death of Ayatollah Sheikh Mahdi Asefi was appointed the representative of the Supreme Leader in Iraq.
