= Seyed Ali Asghar Dastgheib =

Iranian Grand Ayatollah

Grand Ayatollah Sayyid Ali Asghar Dastgheib
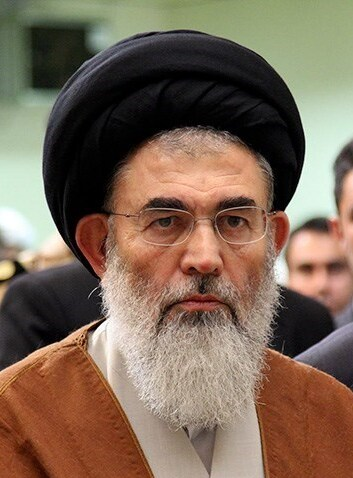
- Ayatollah Ali Asghar Dastgheib in 2014
- Title: Grand Ayatollah

Personal life
- Born: 1945 (age 80–81) Shiraz, Iran
- Website: Official website

Religious life
- Religion: Islam
- Order: Trusteeship of Shah Cheragh
- Sect: Shia; Twelver
- Creed: Usuli

Muslim leader
- Based in: Shiraz, Iran

Grand Ayatollah Sayyid Ali Asghar Dastgheib (Persian: سید علی‌اصغر دستغیب) (born 1945) is an Iranian Twelver Shia Marja and former member of the Iranian Assembly of Experts. He was among those who advised Ruhollah Khomeini in probate matters.

== Biography ==
He was born in December 1945 in Shiraz, Iran. He is the son of Ali Akbar Dastgheib and grandson of Ayatollah Hidayatullah Shirazi. He graduated from Shahpur Shiraz seminary and for higher education went to Qom Seminary. In Qom he studied in seminars of Grand Ayatollah Mirza Hashem Amoli and Grand Ayatollah Golpayegani.

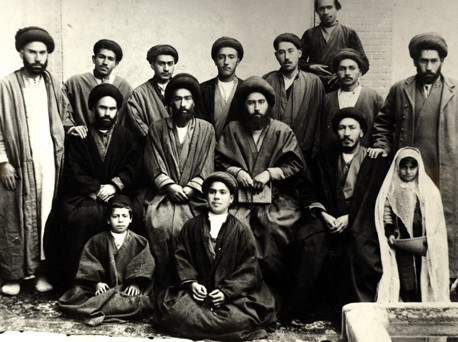
Dastgheib family

== Career ==
In 2013, Asghar became a trustee of the shrine of Shah Cheragh and Muhammad ibn Musa ibn Ja'far in Shiraz by Ali Khamenei.

He also became boss of the Board of Trustees Council in Shiraz .

== See also ==
- List of current maraji
- List of members in the First Term of the Council of Experts
