= Sadegh Khalkhali =

Iranian cleric and politician (1926–2003)

Shaykh Sadegh Khalkhali
- صادق خلخالی
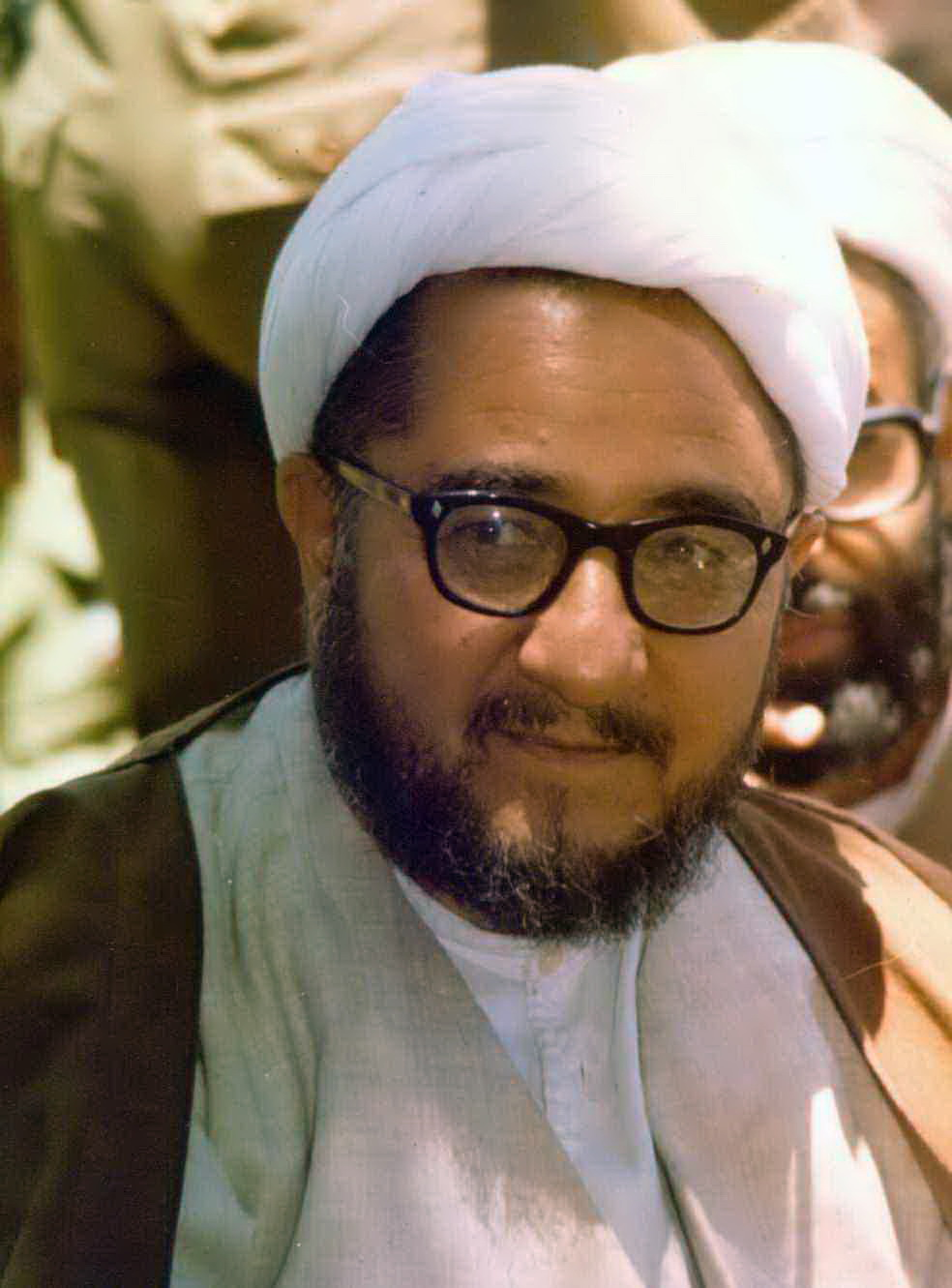

Head of Islamic Revolutionary Court
- In office 24 February 1979 – 1 March 1980
- Appointed by: Ruhollah Khomeini
- Preceded by: Office established
- Succeeded by: Hossein Mousavi Tabrizi

Member of the Parliament of Iran
- In office 28 May 1980 – 28 May 1992
- Constituency: Qom
- Majority: 106,647 (54.8%)

Member of the Assembly of Experts
- In office 15 August 1983 – 21 February 1991
- Constituency: Tehran province
- Majority: 1,048,284 (32.87%)

Personal details
- Born: Mohammed-Sadeq Sadeqi Givi; 27 July 1926 Givi, Khalkhal, Ardabil province, Iran
- Died: 26 November 2003 (aged 77) Tehran, Iran
- Resting place: Fatima Masumeh Shrine, Qom
- Party: Combatant Clergy Association (1979–1988); Association of Combatant Clerics (1988–2003)
- Children: 3

Personal life
- Education: Qom Seminary
- Other name: Hanging Judge

Religious life
- Religion: Shia Islam
- Profession: Judge; Executioner; Cleric

Mohammed Sadeq Givi Khalkhali (Persian: محمدصادق گیوی خلخالی; 27 July 1926 – 26 November 2003) was an Iranian Shia cleric, who was Head of the Islamic Revolutionary Court from 1979 to 1981. He is said to have "brought to his job as Chief Justice of the revolutionary courts a relish for summary execution," which earned him a reputation as Iran's "hanging judge." He remains best-known for the execution of former SAVAK members, destroying the Reza Shah Mausoleum and the desecration of U.S. Soldiers' remains during the Iran hostage crisis.

== Biography ==
Khalkhali was born to a family of Iranian Azeri origins in Kivi, Ardabil of Khalkhal County, Iran (ergo his name). Khalkhali has been described as "a small, rotund man with a pointed beard, kindly smile, and a high-pitched giggle" by The Daily Telegraph.

Khalkhali was one of Khomeini's circle of disciples as far back as 1955, and inherited the former secret society of Islamic assassins known as the Fadayan-e Islam from Navvab Safavi after its dissolution, though he was not a well-known figure to the public prior to the Islamic revolution.

On 24 February 1979, Khalkhali was chosen by Ruhollah Khomeini to be the Sharia ruler (Persian: حاکم شرع) or head the newly established Revolutionary Courts, and to make Islamic rulings. In the early days of the revolution he sentenced to death "hundreds of former government officials" on charges such as "spreading corruption on earth" and "warring against God." Most of the condemned did not have access to a lawyer or a jury. Following the Iranian Revolution in 1979, Reza Shah's mausoleum was destroyed under the direction of Khalkhali, which was sanctioned by Ayatollah Ruhollah Khomeini.

Khalkhali ordered the executions of Amir Abbas Hoveida, the Shah's longtime prime minister, and Nematollah Nassiri, a former head of SAVAK. According to one report, after sentencing Hoveida to death:

Pleas for clemency poured in from all over the world and it was said that Khalkhali was told by telephone to stay the execution. Khalkhali replied that he would go and see what was happening. He then went to Hoveyda and either shot him himself or instructed a minion to do the deed. "I'm sorry," he told the person at the other end of the telephone, "the sentence has already been carried out."

Another version of the story has Khalkhali saying that while presiding over Hoveida's execution he made sure communication links between Qasr Prison and the outside world were severed, "to prevent any last-minute intercession on his behalf by Mehdi Bazargan, the provisional prime minister."

By trying Hoveida, Khalkhali effectively undermined the position of the provisional prime minister of the Islamic Revolution, the moderate Mehdi Bazargan, who disapproved of the Islamic Revolutionary Court and sought to establish the Revolution's reputation for justice and moderation.

Khalkhali held antipathy towards pre-Islamic Iran. In 1979 he wrote a book "branding king Cyrus the Great a tyrant, a liar, and a homosexual" and "called for the destruction of the Tomb of Cyrus and remains of the two-thousand-year-old Persian palace in Shiraz, Fars province, the Persepolis." According to an interview by Elaine Sciolino of Shiraz-based Ayatollah Majdeddin Mahallati, Khalkhali came to Persepolis with "a band of thugs" and gave an angry speech demanding that "the faithful torch the silk-lined tent city and the grandstand that the Shah had built," but was driven off by stone-throwing local residents.

At the height of the Iran hostage crisis in 1980 following the failure of the American rescue mission Operation Eagle Claw and crash of U.S. helicopters killing their crews, Khalkhali appeared on television "ordering the bags containing the dismembered limbs of the dead servicemen to be split open so that the blackened remains could be picked over and photographed," to the anger of American viewers.

Khalkhali, in his positions in the Islamic Revolutionary government, made it his mission to eliminate the community of Bahá'ís in Iran (the largest non-Muslim religious minority). Bahá'ís were stripped of any civil and human rights they had previously been permitted and more than 200 were executed or killed in the early years of the Islamic Republic. All Bahá'í properties were seized, including its holiest site, the House of the Báb in Shiraz, which was turned over by the government to Khalkhali for the activities of the Fada'iyan-i-Islam. The site was subsequently razed, along with the entire neighborhood, for the construction of a mosque and a new road. In addition to presiding over the Islamic Revolutionary Court that brought about the execution of dozens of members of elected Bahá'í Councils, Khalkhali murdered a Bahá'í, Muhammad Muvahhed, who disappeared in 1980 into the revolutionary prison system. It was later reported that Khalkhali personally went to Muvahhed's cell, demanded that he recant his faith and become a Muslim. When Muvahhed refused, Khalkhali covered his face with a pillow and shot him in the head.

Khalkhali later investigated and ordered the execution of many activists for federalism in Kurdistan and Turkmen Sahra. At the height of its activity, Khalkhali's revolutionary court sentenced to death "up to 60 Kurds a day." Following that, in August 1980 he was asked by President Banisadr to take charge of trying and sentencing drug dealers, and sentenced hundreds to death. One of the complaints of the revolution's leader and Khalkhali's superior, the Ayatollah Khomeini against the regime they had overthrown was that the Shah's far more limited number of executions of drug traffickers had been "inhuman."

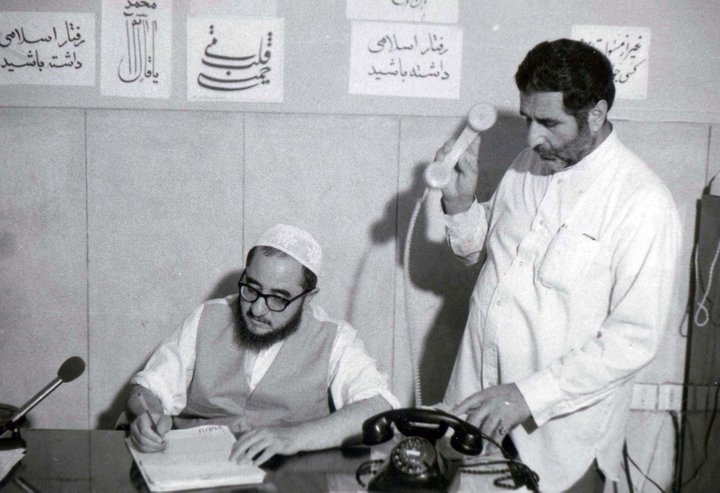
Sadegh Khalkhali, as the Sharia judge of the Islamic Revolutionary Courts, in his office at the Qasr Prison.

In December 1980 his influence waned when he was forced to resign from the revolutionary courts because of his failure to account for $14 million seized through drug raids, confiscations, and fines, although some believe this was as much the doing of President Bani-Sadr and the powerful head of the Islamic Republic Party Ayatollah Mohammad Beheshti "working behind the scenes" to remove a source of bad publicity for the revolution, as a matter of outright corruption.

In the protests of 20 June 1981 Iranian protests, Khalkhali declared that the judiciary was obligated to execute a minimum of fifty agitators daily.

In an interview, Khalkhali personally confirmed ordering more than 100 executions, although many sources believe that by the time of his death he had sent 8,000 men and women to their deaths. In some cases he was the executioner, where he executed his victims using machine guns. In an interview with the French newspaper Le Figaro he is quoted as saying, "If my victims were to come back on earth, I would execute them again, without exceptions."

In 1990, Khalkhali was elected as representative for Qom in Islamic Consultative Assembly for two terms, serving for "more than a decade." In 1992, however, he was one of 39 incumbents from the Third Majles and 1000 or so candidates rejected that winter and spring by the Council of Guardians, which vets candidates. The reason given was a failure to show a "practical commitment to Islam and to the Islamic government," but it was thought by some to be a purge of radical critics of the clerics in power, as Khalkhali had become embittered with current leadership.

In 1997, after the election of President Mohammad Khatami, Khalkhali tried to side with reformists, although he was never really accepted by the movement.

== Later years and death ==
Khalkhali retired to Qom, where he taught Islamic seminarians.

He died in 2003, at the age of 77, of cancer and heart disease. At the time of his death, the speaker of Parliament, Mehdi Karoubi, praised the judge's performance in the early days of the revolution.

== Personal life ==
Khalkhali was married and had a son and two daughters, his son Mohammad Givi-Khalkhali briefly served as the family's spokesman during Khalkhali's declining health, but generally lives a private life.

One of his daughters, Fatemeh Sadeqi, though born in a restrictive Islamic environment, attended university, where she graduated with a PhD, and is now known for her reformist views as a professor, publishing articles such as "Why we say No to mandatory Hijab?"

Though largely secular, when he was accused of theft, she defended her father's legacy: "My father wasn't a thief. He didn’t have any hidden wealth. My father ordered the execution of Hoveyda. He went to Kurdistan. All of this happened, but he didn't steal." When asked about her personal feelings, she said: "Is there anyone who doesn't love their parents?"

== Electoral history ==
Year	Election	Votes	%	Rank	Notes
1979	Constitutional Experts	122,217	4.8	18th	Lost
1980	Parliament	123,136	78.9	1st	Won
1982	Assembly of Experts	1,048,284	32.87	15th	Went to run-off
1982	Assembly of Experts run off	No Data Available		1st	Won
1984	Parliament	▲144,160	▼67.1	1st	Won
1988	Parliament	▼106,647	▼54.8	1st	Won
1990	Assembly of Experts	—N/a			Disqualified
1992	Parliament	—N/a			Disqualified

== See also ==
- Islamic Revolutionary Court
- List of ayatollahs
- List of members in the First Term of the Council of Experts
