= Jalaleddin Taheri =

Iranian Ayatollah (1926-2013)

Jalal Al-Din Taheri
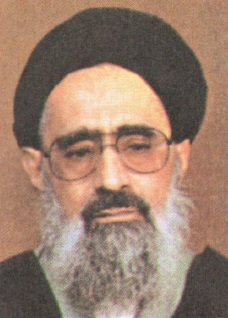
- Born: Jalal Al-Din Taheri Hossein Abadi; January 1, 1926; Isfahan, Iran
- Died: June 2, 2013 (aged 87); Isfahan, Iran
- Known for: Friday prayers Imam of Isfahan; Member of Assembly of Experts
- Children: Abdul Hossein; Malek; Azam; Mohammad Hossein; Mahdi; Ali
- Relatives: Abdul Khalegh Taheri (Father)
- Website: Official website

Seyyed Jalaleddin Taheri Esfahani (Persian: سید جلال‌الدین طاهری اصفهانی, sometimes spelled Jalaluddin Taheri or Jalaleddin Taheri, 1 January 1926 – 2 June 2013) was an Iranian scholar, theologian and Islamic philosopher. He was a critic of Islamic extremism and was the representative of the Supreme Leader of Iran.

== Career ==
Taheri was a member of Assembly of Experts and representative of Ayatollah Ruhollah Khomeini in Isfahan province. In 2002, Taheri resigned after 30 years as prayer leader in Isfahan. Taheri's resignation letter complained of "generalized corruption of religious power in Iran." On 30 June 2009, Taheri wrote an open letter in which he called Mahmoud Ahmadinejad's presidency illegitimate.

== Death ==
Taheri died on 2 June 2013 at near 5 A.M after 35 days of hospitalization due to Respiratory arrest in one of the Isfahan's hospitals. He suffered respiratory disease for a long time. "Tens of thousands" attended his funeral in what was reportedly "Iran's biggest anti-government protest for years". Mourners chanted anti-government slogans such as “the political prisoners must be freed,” and, “Mousavi and Karroubi must be freed,” calling Supreme Leader Ali Khamenei a dictator.

Taheri was buried in his hometown in Golestan Shohadah cemetery beside his son.

== See also ==
- Mohammad Khatami
- Mohsen Kadivar
- List of ayatollahs
- List of members in the First Term of the Council of Experts
