= Lotfollah Dezhkam =

Representative of the Supreme Leader in Fars province

The Ayatollah Lotfollah Dezhkam
- لطف ‌الله دژکام
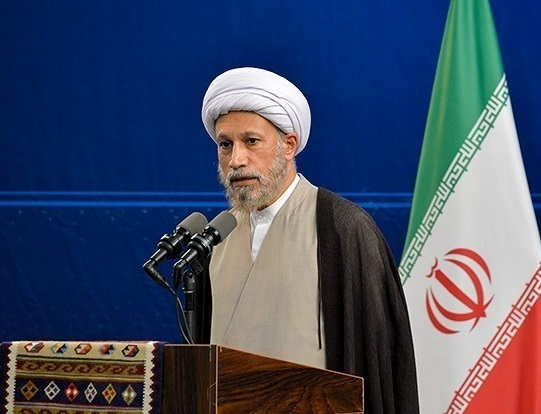

Representative of the Supreme Leader in Fars Imam of Friday Prayer of Shiraz
- Incumbent
- Assumed office 17 May 2018
- Appointed by: Ali Khamenei
- Preceded by: Assad-Allah Imani

Personal details
- Born: 1962 (age 63–64) Jahrom
- Education: Qom Hawza

Lotfollah Dezhkam (Persian: لطف ‌الله دژکام) is the Representative of the Supreme Leader in Fars province, Imam of Friday Prayer of Shiraz and the Representative of Fars in Assembly of Experts.

In a speech he has stated, “The global arrogance led by America with complicity of Israel seeks to delay the realization of an important issue, which is the destruction of the Zionist regime,” calling for the destruction of the nationhood of Israel.
