= Ahmad Moballeghi =

Iranian cleric (born 1961)

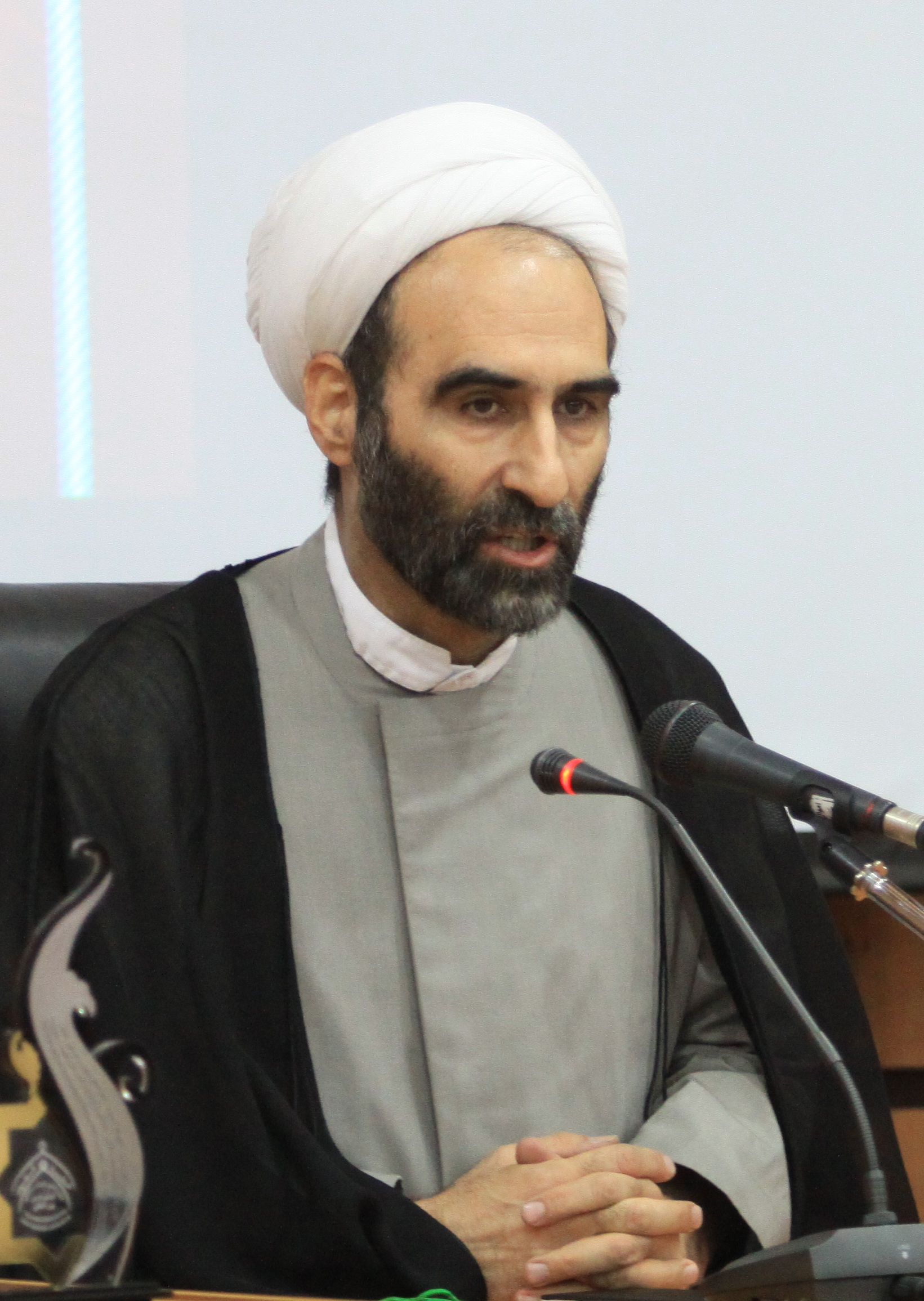

Personal life
- Born: 1959 (age 66–67) Khorramabad, Iran
- Other name: احمد مبلغی
- Website: www.moballeghi.ir

Religious life
- Religion: Twelver Shi'a Islam

Senior posting
- Based in: (Iran) Qom

Ahmad Moballeghi is professor of Qom Seminary at Kharij level, member of Assembly of Experts and the president of the Majlis Islamic Studies Center in Qom. He is one of the international figures of Hawza as well as one of the most eminent theoreticians in Fiqh (Jurisprudence) concerning proximity of various religious schools and religions.

He was born on 1959, in Khorramabad in Iran. His father, Ayatollah Mashaallah Morawweji, was one of the distinguished scholars of Lorestan. He was one of the activists of Iranian Revolution; and, in the process of his political activities, he was arrested and imprisoned.
