= List of chairmen of the Assembly of Experts =

This article lists the chairmen of the Assembly of Experts of the Islamic Republic of Iran, from the establishment of the Assembly of Experts in 1983 to the present day.

== List of chairmen ==
No.	Portrait	Name (Birth–Death)	Tenure			Political affiliation	Term
No.	Portrait	Name (Birth–Death)	Took office	Left office	Duration	Political affiliation	Term
1		Ali Meshkini علی مشکینی (1921–2007)	12 November 1983	25 July 2007	23 years, 255 days	Society of Seminary Teachers of Qom	1st
1		Ali Meshkini علی مشکینی (1921–2007)	12 November 1983	25 July 2007	23 years, 255 days	Society of Seminary Teachers of Qom	2nd
1		Ali Meshkini علی مشکینی (1921–2007)	12 November 1983	25 July 2007	23 years, 255 days	Society of Seminary Teachers of Qom	3rd
1		Ali Meshkini علی مشکینی (1921–2007)	12 November 1983	25 July 2007	23 years, 255 days	Society of Seminary Teachers of Qom	4th
2		Akbar Hashemi Rafsanjani اکبر هاشمی رفسنجانی (1934–2017)	25 July 2007	8 March 2011	3 years, 226 days	Combatant Clergy Association	4th
3		Mohammad-Reza Mahdavi Kani محمدرضا مهدوی کنی (1931–2014)	8 March 2011	21 October 2014 (Died in office)	3 years, 227 days	Combatant Clergy Association	4th
—		Mahmoud Hashemi Shahroudi محمود هاشمی شاهرودی (1948–2018) (acting)	21 October 2014	10 March 2015	140 days	Society of Seminary Teachers of Qom	4th
4		Mohammad Yazdi محمد یزدی (1931–2020)	10 March 2015	24 May 2016	1 year, 75 days	Society of Seminary Teachers of Qom	4th
5		Ahmad Jannati احمد جنتی (born 1927)	24 May 2016	21 May 2024	7 years, 363 days	Society of Seminary Teachers of Qom	5th
6		Mohammad-Ali Movahedi Kermani محمدعلی موحدی کرمانی (born 1931)	21 May 2024	Incumbent	2 years, 26 days	Combatant Clergy Association	6th

== See also ==
- List of current members in the Assembly of Experts
- List of members in the First Term of the Council of Experts
- List of members in the Second Term of the Council of Experts
- List of members in the Third Term of the Council of Experts
- List of members in the Fourth Term of the Council of Experts
- List of members in the Fifth Term of the Council of Experts
- List of members in the Sixth Term of the Council of Experts
