= Ali Akbar Kalantari =

Iranian cleric (born 1962)

Ali Akbar Kalantari

Ali Akbar Kalantari (born 1962 in Arsanjan) is a Shiite cleric and one of the representatives of Fars Province in the fifth and sixth terms of the Assembly of Experts. He entered the Assembly of Experts in Fars Province in the 2015 elections, coming in fifth place. Kalantari is a member of the theology faculty at Shiraz University. He is currently the dean of the Faculty of Theology.

== Biography ==
Ali Akbar Kalantari was born in the year 1962 in the city of Arsanjan, Fars, to a family of farmers and hard workers. He received his primary, secondary and high school education in this city. His desire to understand religion and learn Islamic sciences led him to enter the seminary after completing high school. He studied the basics and some of the seminary level for 4 years at the Agha Baba Khan Seminary in Shiraz. After that, he went to the Qom Seminary and for four years from 1985 to 1999, he gained grace from the great professors of this seminary.

== Compilations ==
Among his known compilations are:

- The book of the second ruling in Islamic legislation (Book of the year of the seminary in 1999 and the selected research of religious scholars in 1998)
- The book of Islam and the consumption pattern (a work encouraged by the Secretariat of Religious Scholars in 2005)
- The book of the role of men's knowledge in interpretation and Quranic sciences (selected research by the National Congress of Religious Scholars in 2002)
- The book of the determination of livelihood (the best religious research of 2004 by the Secretariat of Religious Scholars in 2006)
- The book of jurisprudence and women's clothing (the selected cultural research of Fars province in 2006)
- The book of Aftab Shiraz (a new and comprehensive research on the personality and burial place of Ahmad ibn Musa (AS), known as Shahcheragh)
- The book of the Shiite Imams (peace be upon them) from the perspective of the Sunni brothers
- The book of ethics and student manners
- The book of ethics of life
- The book of al-Jizyyah and its rulings in Islamic jurisprudence (in Arabic)
- The book of jizyyah and its rulings in jurisprudence Islamic (Persian)
- The book Principles and Principles of Correctly Utilizing the Lives of the Infallibles (PBUH)
- The book Extremism, the Plague of All Religions
- The book Hadith of Affection (Ways of the Heart's Presence in Prayer)
- The book Ethics and Manners of the Employee
- The book Ethics and Manners of Business
- The book Rooyesh (An Introduction to the Efficiency of the Islamic Republic System)

== Records and responsibilities ==
- Management of the Seminary of Fars Province / 2006 - 2009
- Management of Agha Baba Khan Seminary / 2008 - 2011
- Establishment of the Shiraz Quranic Sciences Complex and its management (under the supervision of His Eminence Grand Ayatollah Makarem Shirazi) / 2008 - 2012
- Member of the Board of Directors of the Persian Studies Foundation / 2005 - 2008
- Dean of the Faculty of Theology, University of Shiraz / 2013 – 2014
