= Gholamreza Rezvani =

Iranian Ayatollah (1922-2013)

Ayatollah Gholamreza Rezvani
- غلامرضا رضوانی

Member of Assembly of Experts
- In office 10 December 1982 – 15 December 2006
- Preceded by: Office Began
- Succeeded by: Mohsen Kazeroni
- Constituency: Tehran Province

Personal details
- Born: 23 September 1930 Khomein
- Died: 19 April 2013 (aged 82) Tehran

Gholamreza Rezvani (Persian: غلامرضا رضوانی; September 23, 1930 – April 19, 2013) was a member of the Council of Guardians in the Islamic Republic of Iran. He believed in literal interpretation of Quran, hadith, and sunnah and has argued that there is "no substitute" for stoning adulterers.

== See also ==
- Iranian Criminal Code
- List of ayatollahs
- List of members in the First Term of the Council of Experts
- List of members in the Second Term of the Council of Experts
- List of members in the Third Term of the Council of Experts
