= Ali Akbar Ghoreishi =

Iranian Ayatollah

Ayatollah; Seyyed; Ali Akbar Ghoreishi
- علی‌اکبر قریشی
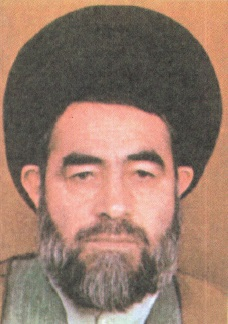

Member of Assembly of Experts
- Incumbent
- Assumed office 15 August 1983
- Constituency: West Azerbaijan
- Majority: 822,027 (5th)

Member of Assembly of Experts for Constitution
- In office 15 August 1979 – 15 November 1979
- Constituency: West Azerbaijan
- Majority: 152,428 (46.8%)

Personal details
- Born: 1928 (age 97–98) Bonab, East Azerbaijan
- Party: The Two Societies
- Education: Qom Hawza

Ayatollah Seyed Ali Akbar Ghoreishi (Persian: علی‌اکبر قریشی, born 1928 in Bonab, East Azerbaijan) is an Iranian Shiite cleric, author and politician. He is a member of 1st, 2nd, 3rd 4th, 5th and 6th Assembly of Experts from electorate West Azerbaijan. Ghoreishi won with 549,011 votes. Emblem of Research by Mahmoud Ahmadinejad, was awarded to him. His son Mehdi Ghoreishi is the representative of the Supreme Leader in West Azerbaijan and Imam Jumu'ah Friday prayer of Urmia.

== Works ==
- Quran and Friendship Ahl al-Bayt
- History of Ahl al-Bayt
