= 1990 Iranian Assembly of Experts election =

2nd Iranian Assembly of Experts election

Assembly of Experts elections
- October 8, 1990

83 Seats in Assembly of Experts 54 seats needed for a majority
- Registered: 31,280,084
- Turnout: 37.09%
Chairman before election
Ali Meshkini
Conservatives
Elected Chairman
Ali Meshkini
Conservatives

The second Iranian Assembly of Experts election was held on October 8, 1990, to elect all 83 members in 24 constituencies. The election was the first election of the assembly since Ayatollah Khomeini's death and the election of Ali Khamenei as the new Supreme Leader. This election had the lowest turnout in the history of the Islamic Republic of Iran with 37.09% of the eligible voters participating.

Out of 180 individuals registered to run, 109 (60.55%) were qualified by the Guardian Council. The council disqualified many left-wing clerics including Mehdi Karroubi, Sadegh Khalkhali, Ali Akbar Mohtashamipur, Hadi Khamenei and Asadollah Bayat-Zanjani. As a sign of protest, the leading leftist party Association of Combatant Clerics decided not to endorse any candidate and some withdrew from the elections, most notably Mohammad Mousavi Khoeiniha.

During elections, some candidates tried to argue that the assembly was authorized to exercise continuous supervision over the Supreme Leader's policies and activities. In practice, however, the assembly had exercised no such mandate.

Ahmad Khomeini, Mohammad-Taqi Mesbah-Yazdi and Mohammad Yazdi were among the newly elected members of the assembly.

== See also ==
- List of members in the Second Term of the Council of Experts
