= 2024 Iranian Assembly of Experts election =

Election in Iran

- 1 March 2024
- Turnout: 40%-41%
Party	Leader	Vote %	Seats	+/–
Principlists	Movahedi Kermani	65.91	58	−7
Reformists	-	2.27	2	−17
Independents	-	31.82	28	+24
This lists parties that won seats. See the complete results below.
Composition of the Assembly of Experts after election
Chairman before	Chairman after
Ahmad Jannati	Mohammad-Ali Movahedi Kermani

The 2024 Iranian Assembly of Experts election were held on 1 March 2024, concurrently with the elections of the Islamic Consultative Majlis. Directly elected by the public from a list of candidates vetted by the Guardian Council, the Assembly of Experts is made up of 88 clerics with the responsibility of supervising the Supreme Leader and selecting a new one.

== Candidates ==
A total of 510 candidates registered for the election and were vetted by the council, bringing it down to only 138 by disqualifying moderates, and even several principlists, in favor of hardliners of the regime.

Former president Hassan Rouhani applied for re-election in his home province of Semnan, as did Rouhani's former Interior Minister, Mahmoud Alavi and Minister of Justice Mostafa Pourmohammadi. However, all three were barred by the Guardian Council from standing, without publishing a reason. Rouhani described the decision as a "politically biased" ruling that "will undermine the nation's confidence in the system".

Former President Ebrahim Raisi, who was also a member of the Assembly of Experts, was expected to run for re-election in Tehran. He instead chose to run in a rural constituency of South Khorasan province in which he is the only candidate for the seat.

== Coverage ==
Euronews wrote the only real winner of elections in Iran was Supreme Leader Ayatollah Ali Khamenei as competition is also centered around "ego, personality and resources."

During the election, images surfaced of Afghan nationals getting Iranian birth certificates in order to vote. In response, the Ministry of Interior dismissed the allegations as rumors.

== Results ==
Then-president Raisi comfortably renewed his place at the Assembly of Experts for a third time, securing more than 82% votes in South Khorasan, after one candidate changed his district to ceremonially run against Raisi. Ultraconservative Ahmad Khatami was re-elected in province of Kerman, and Mohammad Saeedi is Qom's representative. Mohammad Ali Ale-Hashem, the supreme leader's representative in Tabriz, recorded the highest number of votes ever for an assembly winner with over 834,000 votes.

The Ministry of Interior extended voting time three times until Friday midnight, sixteen hours after the start, due to a "rush" of people at polling stations. But discussions centered around the low turnout in the aftermath of 2022 protests and as Iran's economy battled with high inflation. Preliminary results showed some 25 million people voted, which would put the turnout at around 40%-41%. State media hailed this as a "huge defeat" for the anti-establishment's boycott of the elections. The Islamic Revolutionary Guard Corps thanked Iranians for their "glorious" participation in the elections as a "decisive response to enemies".

High-profile moderates and conservatives stayed away from the election and reformists called it neither free nor fair, as it was mainly a contest between hardliners and low-key conservatives loyal to Islamic revolutionary ideals. Mohammad Khatami, Iran's first reformist president, did not vote, while Narges Mohammadi, the imprisoned Nobel Peace Prize laureate for advocating women's rights, called the election a "sham".

However, some comments considered a "notable shift" in the Assembly's composition, despite the mass disqualification, towards younger clerics loyal to Khamenei. Pro-Rafsanjani clerics and reformists were sidelined, showing the determination to consolidate power and maintain control over the succession process.

== See also ==
- 2024 Iranian legislative election
