= Assad-Allah Imani =

Iranian Ayatollah (1947-2018)

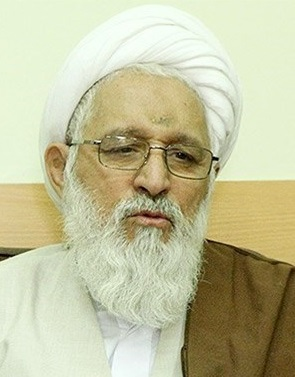
Asadullah Imani; a member of assembly of experts, and also the Imam of Prayer in Shiraz

Assad-Allah Imani (Persian: اسد‌الله ایمانی), (or Asadullah Imani) (11 May 1947 – 7 May 2018) was an Iranian Twelver Shia scholar, who was a member of assembly of experts, and also the Imam of Prayer in Shiraz.

== Family and life ==
Assad-Allah Imani was born in the city of Kazeroun (Fars province) in a religious family, and his family was known for "professing Islam". His ancestor was Karbalayi-Assadollah, and his father was Muhammad Sadeq Imani. Imani passed his elementary school at the city of Kazeroun; he also passed the first three years of Hawzah primary lessons by the side of his city's scholars. In 1962, he departed for Qom, and was educated by the sides of scholars such as Mohammad Fazel Lankarani, Naser Makarem Shirazi and Ja'far Sobhani.

== Teachers ==
Among his teachers, are:

- Mohammad-Taqi Sotudeh
- Salavati
- Hossein Shab-Zendedar
- Mohammad Fazel Lankarani
- Naser Makarem Shirazi
- Ja'far Sobhani
- Mostafa Etemadi
- Seyyed Mohammad-Baqer Soltani Tabatabai
- Seyyed Mohammad Mohaqeq Damad
- Mirza Hashem Amoli
- Seyyed Mohammad-Reza Golpaygani
- Yahya Ansari
- Abdollah Javadi-Amoli
- Abdu-Rahim Rabani Shirazi

Etc.

== Works ==
This Shia cleric, presented several compilations, amongst them are:

- A thesis on Khums
- A thesis on Erth (inheritance)
- A thesis in Taqqiah
- A thesis in Amr-be-Ma'ruf
- Participation in set/collection of Tafsir-Nemouneh

And so on.

== See also ==
- Assembly of Experts
- List of provincial representatives appointed by Supreme Leader of Iran
- List of ayatollahs
- List of members in the First Term of the Council of Experts
