= Kazem Nourmofidi =

Iranian Ayatollah

Ayatollah; Seyyed; Kazem Noor Mofidi
- سید کاظم نورمفیدی
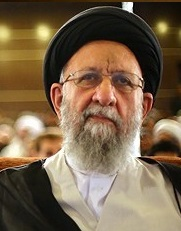

Representative of the Supreme Leader in Golestan and Friday Prayers Imam of Gorgan
- Incumbent
- Assumed office 23 July 1979
- Appointed by: Ruhollah Khomeini

Member of the Assembly of Experts
- In office 12 December 1982 – 21 May 2024
- Constituency: Mazandaran Golestan

Personal details
- Born: 1940 (age 85–86) Gorgan, Iran

Seyed Kazem Noor Mofidi (Persian: سید کاظم نورمفیدی, born 1940) is a Supreme Leader's representative in Golestan Province, the leader of congregational Friday prayers of Gorgan, and a former member of the Assembly of Experts in Iran. He is considered the oldest Friday prayer leader in the country and the only provincial representative of the Supreme Leader of Iran to be a reformist .

== Biography ==
=== Before Iran revolution ===
Seyed Kazem Noor Mofidi was born in 1940. After elementary school, at the age of twelve, he studied religious sciences, and after four years of studying in Gorgan, he moved to Mashhad and from there to Qom. In the important centres of Islamic education, he studied religious sciences and attained the degree of ijtihad. Seyyed Ruhollah Khomeini, Mohaghegh Damad, Mohammad Ali Araki, Seyyed Mohammad Reza Golpayegani, Morteza Haeri Yazdi and Morteza Motahhari were among his professors.

=== Marriage ===
In 1962, he married the sister of Mohammad Fazel Lankarani and he has three sons and a daughter.

=== Struggles ===
Seyed Kazem Noor Mofidi was an activist in the fight against Pahlavi. He was once commissioned by Ruhollah Khomeini to deliver his message to the mullahs of Gorgan.

=== After Iran revolution ===
At the beginning of the Iranian Revolution, he became the head of the temporary committee of the youth revolution. In 1979, he was appointed the Friday Imamate of Gorgan and the representative of Seyyed Ruhollah Khomeini in Gorgan and Dasht region. After Khomeini's death, the sentence of representing his supreme leader was enforced by Seyyed Ali Khamenei.

== Career ==
He is now the representative of the Vali-Faqih in Golestan province, leader of congregational Friday prayers, a former member of the Assembly of experts, lecturer in the supreme and outside of the jurisprudence of Gorgan Seminary and the head of the Management Council of the Golestan Seminary.

== See also ==
- Mahmoud Hashemi Shahroudi
- Sadeq Larijani
- Abdul-Nabi Namazi
- List of ayatollahs
- List of members in the First Term of the Council of Experts
- Assembly of Experts
- List of provincial representatives appointed by Supreme Leader of Iran
