= List of provincial representatives appointed by Supreme Leader of Iran =

The Vali-e-Faqih representatives in provinces of Iran (Persian: فهرست نمایندگان ولی فقیه در استان‌های ایران) are the appointees of the Vali-e-Faqih Ali Khamenei based in each of the country's provinces. They are also Imam of Friday Prayers in the capital of each province, and some of them are also members of Assembly of Experts.

The Vali-e-Faqih representatives in provinces of Iran are:

- Alborz: Seyyed Mohammad Mahdi Hosseini Hamedani (Imam-Juma' of Karaj)
- Ardabil: Hassan Ameli (Imam-Juma' of Ardabil)
- Bushehr: Gholam Ali Safai Bushehri (Imam-Juma' of Bushehr)
- Chaharmahal and Bakhtiari: Mohammad Ali Nekunam (Imam-Juma' of Shahr-e Kord)
- East Azerbaijan: Ahmad Motahhari Asl (Imam-Juma' of Tabriz)
- Fars: Lotfollah Dejkam (Imam-Juma' of Shiraz)
- Gilan: Rasool Falahati (Imam-Juma' of Rasht)
- Golestan: Kazem Nourmofidi (Imam-Juma' of Gorgan)
- Hamadan: Habibollah Shabani Moaseghi (Imam-Juma' of Hamadan)
- Hormozgān: Mohammad Ebadizadeh (Imam-Juma' of Bandar Abbas)
- Ilam: Allah Noor Karimi Tabar (Imam-Juma' of Ilam)
- Isfahan: Yousef Tabatabai Nejad (Imam-Juma' of Isfahan)
- Isfahan: Saeed Hosseini (Imam-Juma' of Kashan)
- Kerman: Hasan Alidadi Soleimani (Imam-Juma' of Kerman)
- Kermanshah: Mostafa Olama (Imam-Juma' of Kermanshah)
- Khuzestan: Abdul-Nabi Mousavi Fard (Imam-Juma' of Ahwaz)
- Kohgiluyeh and Boyer-Ahmad: Nasir Hosseini (Imam-Juma' of Yasuj)
- Kordestan: Seyyed Mohammad Hosseini Shahroodi
- Lorestan: Seyyed Ahmad Reza Shahrokhi (Imam-Juma' of Khorramabad)
- Markazi: Ghorbanali Dorri-Najafabadi (Imam-Juma' of Arak)
- Mazandaran: Mohammad Bagher Mohammadi Laeeni (Imam-Juma' of Sari)
- North Khorasan: Reza Nouri (Imam-Juma' of Bojnord)
- Qazvin: Abdolkarim Abedini (Imam-Juma' of Qazvin)
- Qom: Seyyed Mohammad Saeedi (Imam-Juma' of Qom)
- Razavi Khorasan: Seyyed Ahmad Alamolhoda (Imam-Juma' of Mashhad)
- Semnan: Morteza Motei (Imam-Juma' of Semnan)
- Sistan and Baluchestan: Mostafa Mahami (Imam-Juma' of Zahedan)
- South Khorasan: Seyyed Ali Reza Ebadi (Imam-Juma' of Birjand)
- West Azerbaijan: Seyyed Mehdi Ghoreishi (Imam-Juma' of Urmia)
- Yazd: Mohammad Reza Naseri Yazdi (Imam-Juma' of Yazd)
- Zanjan: Ali Khatami (Imam-Juma' of Zanjan)

== See also ==
- 1989 Iranian supreme leader election
- Supreme Leader of Iran
