= Abbas Mahfouzi =

Iranian Grand Ayatollah (1928–2024)

Grand Ayatollah Abbas Mahfouzi
- آيت‌الله العظمى عباس محفوظى
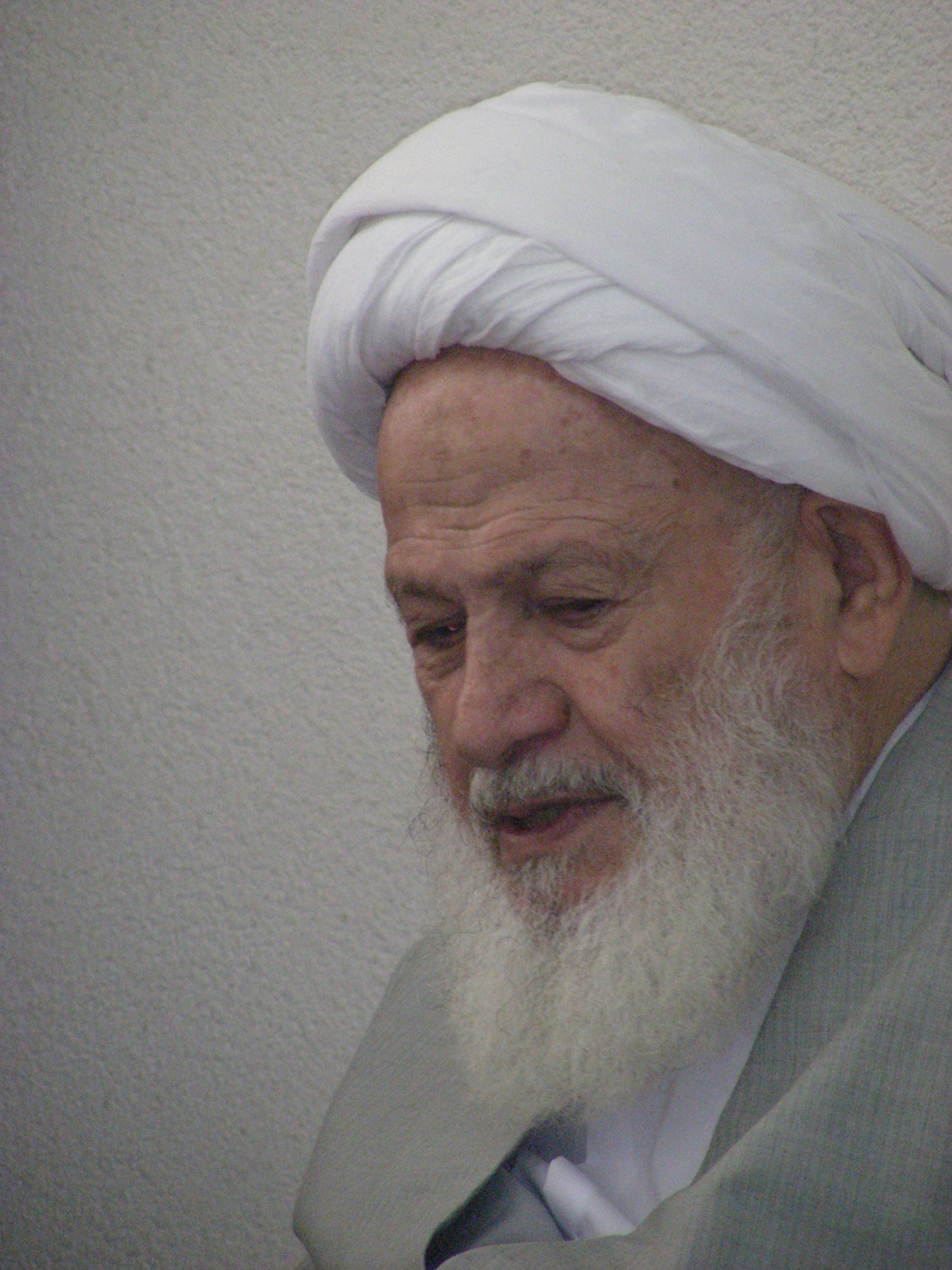
- Mahfouzi in 2016
- Title: Grand Ayatollah

Personal life
- Born: 9 August 1928 Rudsar, Persia
- Died: 10 September 2024 (aged 96) Qom, Iran
- Website: http://www.mahfoozi.ir

Religious life
- Religion: Usuli Twelver Shia Islam

Senior posting
- Based in: Qom, Iran
- Post: Grand Ayatollah

Grand Ayatollah Abbas Mahfouzi (Arabic: آيت‌الله العظمى عباس محفوظى, Persian: آيت‌الله العظمى عباس محفوظى; 9 August 1928 – 10 September 2024) was an Iranian Twelver Shia Marja. He studied in seminars of Qom, Iran under Ruhollah Khomeini, Grand Ayatollah Houssein Borujerdi and Mirza Hashem Amoli.

== Biography ==
Grand Ayatollah Abbas Mahfouzi was born in Rudsar, Iran. He started the education of Quran in his childhood. For higher education, he went to Rudsar Seminary. Later he traveled to Qom and studied in Seminars of Qom under Imam Khomeni, Houssein Borujerdi, Mirza Hashem Amoli, Mohammad Reza Golpaygani and Houssein Ali Montezari. He was a firm supporter of Khomeni and he supported Khomeini during 1979 Iranian Revolution.

Mahfouzi died on 10 September 2024, at the age of 96.

== Political activities and struggles ==
Before the Iranian Revolution, Mahfouzi had direct contact with Ayatollah Khomeini. He opposed the Provincial and District Associations by distributing statements. He was later arrested by SAVAK in Qom and sent into exile in 1973. He was also a member of the Society of Seminary Teachers. After the revolution, he was the Supreme Leader's representative at the University of Tehran for eight years and was a member of the Central Council of the Supreme Leader's representatives at universities. He also worked for more than eight years in choosing university professors in Iran and went to the war fronts three times.

He was among those who supported the selection of Ayatollah Seyyed Ali Khamenei as the Supreme Leader of the Islamic Republic of Iran following the death of Imam Khomeini.

== See also ==
- List of current maraji
- List of ayatollahs
- List of members in the First Term of the Council of Experts
