= 1982 Iranian Assembly of Experts election =

1st Iranian Assembly of Experts election

Assembly of Experts elections
- December 10, 1982

82 Seats in Assembly of Experts 54 seats needed for a majority
- Registered: 23,277,871
- Turnout: 77.38%
Elected Chairman
Ali Meshkini

The first Iranian Assembly of Experts election was held on December 10 1982, to elect all 82 members in 24 constituencies. 18,013,061 citizens voted in the elections, marking a 77.38% turnout. Out of 168 individuals registered to run, 146 (86.90%) were qualified allowed to do so.

Held in two-round system, 76 seats were decided in the first round, as well as 7 in the second round.

Experts winning the elections made decisive resolutions, including electing Hussein-Ali Montazeri as the first and only "Deputy Supreme Leader of Iran" (Persian: قائم‌مقام رهبری) in May 1985, deposing him in November 1987, and electing the new Supreme Leader in June 1989.

== See also ==
- List of members in the First Term of the Council of Experts
