= Mohammad Mohammadi Gilani =

Iranian Ayatollah (1929-2014)

Ayatollah Mohammad Mohammadi Gilani
- محمد محمدی گیلانی
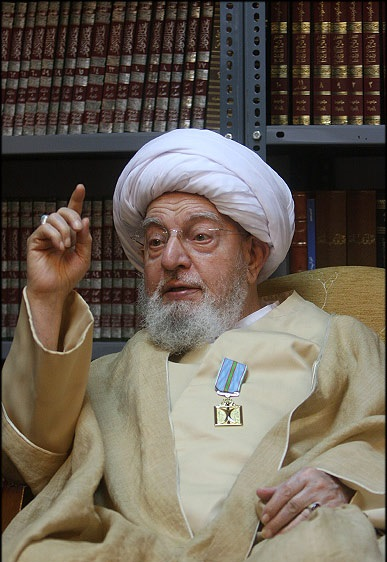
- Gilani in 2009

Assembly of Experts member
- In office 14 July 1983 – 7 July 2014

Guardian Council member
- In office 1986–1992
- Constituency: Tehran Province

Personal details
- Born: August 31, 1929 Rey, Iran
- Died: 9 July 2014 (aged 84) Tehran, Iran

Mohammad Mohammadi Gilani (Persian: محمد محمدی گیلانی; 31 August 1929 – 9 July 2014) was a member of the Assembly of Experts of the Islamic Republic of Iran. He was the chief justice of the supreme court of Iran, a position different from the head of the judiciary.

Gilani was a judge of Tehran's Islamic Revolutionary Court for 1980–85. Later, he was a member of the Guardian Council between 1986 and 1992. Gilani was one of the judges that handed out death sentences to protestors during the 1981–1982 Iran Massacres. In a press conference, Gilani justified the trials and executions of the young girls. "By the Islamic canon," he stated, "a nine-year-old girl is mature. So there is no difference for us between a nine-year-old girl and a 40-year-old man."

Gilani is also known for having signed the death warrants of Baháʼí Faith leaders in the years following the 1979 Islamic Revolution.
