= Hadi Khosroshahi =

Iranian cleric and diplomat

- سید هادی خسروشاهی
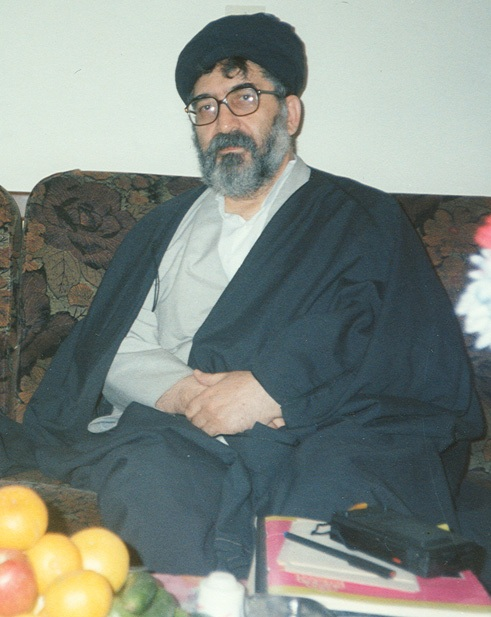
- Khosroshahi in 2005

Iranian Ambassador to the Holy See
- In office 1981–1986
- Appointed by: Ruhollah Khomeini

Personal details
- Born: c. 1939 Tabriz, East Azerbaijan Province, Imperial State of Iran
- Died: 27 February 2020 (aged 80–81) Tehran, Iran
- Cause of death: COVID-19
- Relatives: Mohammad Sadeq Rouhani (father-in-law)

Seyyed Hadi Khosroshahi (Persian: سید هادی خسروشاهی; c. 1939 – 27 February 2020) was an Iranian cleric and diplomat who served as Iran's first ambassador to the Vatican.

== Career ==
When he was 15 years old, Khosroshahi joined the leader of militant Fada'iyan-e Islam (Devotees of Islam), Sayyid Mojtaba Mir-Lohi, nicknamed Navvab Safavi. He was close to Egypt's Muslim Brotherhood and reportedly the first person to identify himself as ikhwani (Islamist) Shia. In at least two interviews, he claims to have sought and been denied Khomeini's approval for the assassination of the Islamic Republic's first President, Abolhassan Bani Sadr and Iran's last Queen Farah Pahlavi, both living in exile in Paris.

Khosroshahi was a prominent figure in the Qom Seminary and was a representative of Ayatollah Khomeini in the Ministry of Culture and Islamic Guidance after the victory of the Iranian Revolution in 1979. After two years, he became the Ambassador of the Islamic Republic to the Vatican. He was the first Shi'a clergy serving and representing the Islamic Republic at the Vatican. While in the Vatican, he founded the Europe's Islamic Culture Center, a base for propagating Shi'ism in the West. After serving in the Vatican, Khosroshahi was sent to Cairo, where he represented Tehran for two years at the Islamic Republic's Interest Section.

== Death ==
Khosroshahi died from COVID-19 on 27 February 2020, in Iran.

== See also ==
- List of ayatollahs
- List of members in the First Term of the Council of Experts
