= Ali Meshkini =

Iranian ayatollah (1921–2007)

- علی‌اکبر فیض آلنی
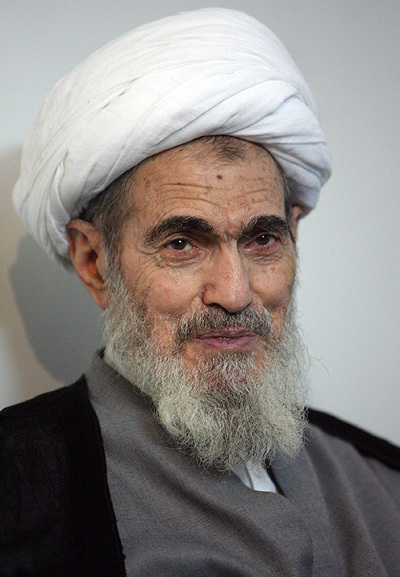
- Meshkini in 2006

Personal life
- Born: 2 December 1921 Meshgin Shahr, Iran
- Died: 30 July 2007 (aged 85) Tehran, Iran
- Resting place: Fatima Masumeh Shrine, Qom

Religious life
- Religion: Shia Islam
- Sect: Twelver

1st Chairman of the Assembly of Experts for Leadership
- In office 12 November 1983 – 30 July 2007
- Supreme Leader: Ruhollah Khomeini; Ali Khamenei
- Preceded by: Office created
- Succeeded by: Akbar Hashemi Rafsanjani

Member of the Assembly of Experts for Leadership
- In office 15 August 1983 – 30 July 2007
- Constituency: Tehran Province

Member of the Assembly of Experts for Constitution
- In office 15 August 1979 – 15 November 1979
- Constituency: East Azerbaijan Province
- Majority: 434,262 (47.9%)

Personal details
- Party: Combatant Clergy Association; Society of Seminary Teachers of Qom

Ali Akbar Feiz Alni (Persian: علی‌اکبر فیض آلنی; 2 December 1921 – 30 July 2007), better known as Ali Meshkini (علی مشکینی), was an Iranian Islamic cleric and politician.

== Life ==
Meshkini was an Iranian Azerbaijani born in a village near Meshkin Shahr and the Sabalan mountain. He succeeded Ayatollah Montazeri as chairman of the Iranian Assembly of Experts after the latter was ousted. The Assembly of Experts select the Supreme Leader of Iran and supervised his activities.

Meshkini chaired the commission that drafted the amendment of 1989 to the 1979 constitution of Iran. Within the commission, he also chaired one of its four committees, the one tasked with drafting amendments that would strengthen the judiciary. As such, he was an influential force in changing the leadership of the judiciary from a triumvirate, the Supreme Judicial Council, to an individual in 1989.

He was the author of many books on Islamic jurisprudence and general issues of Islam. Mohammadi Reyshahri, Iran's minister of intelligence from 1984 to 1989, was Meshkini's son-in-law.

Meshkini was the chair of the Society of Seminary Teachers of Qom and also served as Friday prayer leader in Qom. Despite his old age and poor health, he became a candidate for re-election in 2006 Assembly of Experts elections.

== Death ==
Meshkini died on 30 July 2007 at 16:30 local time, at Tehran Hospital, of respiratory and kidney failure.

== Quotes and political views ==
Meshkini was known for his unyielding support of the likes of Ahmadinejad and the hardline politicians of Iran. He regarded the Iranian reformist movement "as a complete waste of time" and on several occasions called for the resignation of the likes of Mohammad Khatami.

After the election of Ahmadinejad, Meshkini spoke at a Friday prayer in Ardebil saying: "As the Supreme Leader of The Assembly of Experts of the Islamic Republic of Iran, it gives me great pleasure to announce that Dr. Mahmoud Ahmadinejad is our new President. From this moment onwards, we will follow his words (religiously). Our people in Azerbaijan will follow him alongside the Persians in the same spirit of brotherhood that we have kept for decades ... as Shia's".

After the Israel-Lebanon conflict, Meshkini has been quoted to say that "victory of the Lebanese Hizbollah over the Zionist regime was a divine phenomenon."

Referring to US occupation of Iraq, Meshkini said: "A bully has embarked on a military expedition and has attacked another bully in the midst of Islamic countries ... Look at what they have done and what they are doing under the pretext of freedom ... The mask of deception has been lifted from the face of Bush and Blair. It has become clear that they are both blood-sucking Hitlers."

Political offices
Preceded by Inaugural holder	Chair of Assembly of Experts; 1983–2007	Succeeded by Akbar Hashemi Rafsanjani
Religious titles
Preceded by Mohammad Yazdi	Friday prayers Imam of Qom; 1990–2007	Succeeded by Abdollah Javadi Amoli
