= Assembly of Experts =

Iranian governmental body

Coordinates: 35°41′17″N 51°23′59″E

Assembly of Experts مجلس خبرگان رهبری Majles-e Khobregan-e Rahbari
- Emblem of Iran

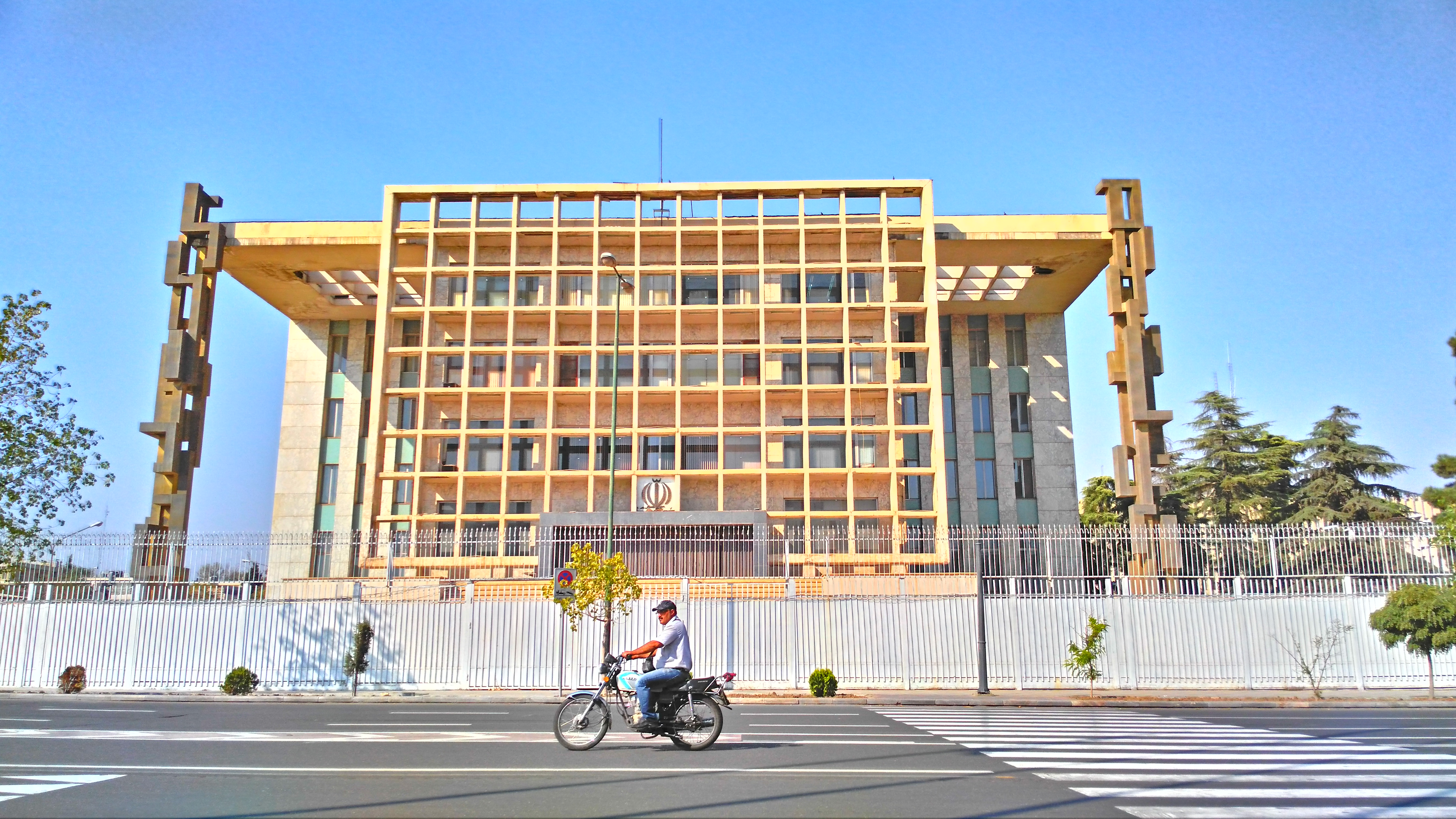
- The Assembly of Experts is housed in the former Pahlavi-era Senate building in Tehran.

Leadership
- Chairman: Mohammad-Ali Movahedi Kermani since 21 May 2024
- First Deputy Chairman: Hashem Hosseini Bushehri since 21 May 2024
- Second Deputy Chairman: Alireza Arafi since 21 May 2024

Structure
- Seats: 88
- Political groups: By alliance: Principlists (59); Reformists (1); Independents (26); Vacant (2); By party: TTS (60); SST (8); CCA (6); IND (12); Vacant (2)
- Length of term: 8 years

Elections
- Voting system: Multi-seat districts: Plurality-at-large voting Single-seat districts: First-past-the-post voting
- Last election: 1 March 2024

Meeting place
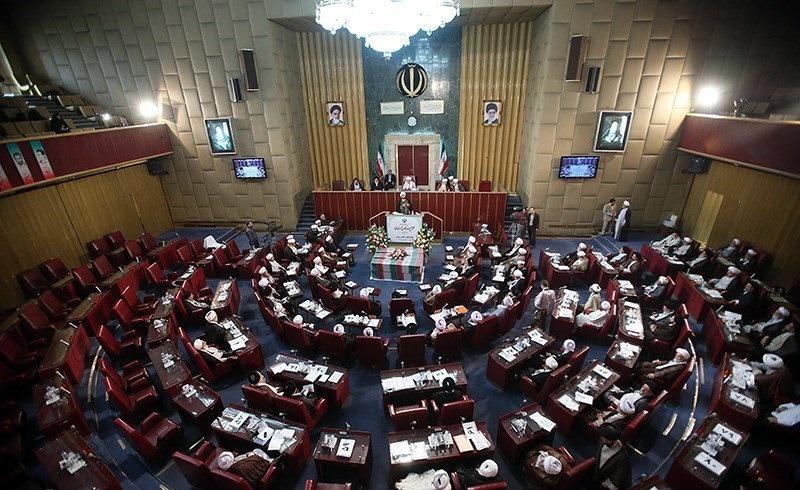

The Assembly of Experts (Persian: مجلس خبرگان رهبری, romanized: Majles-e Khobregān-e Rahbarī, lit. 'Assembly of Experts for Leadership') is the deliberative body of Iran empowered to appoint, supervise, and discharge the supreme leader of Iran. The assembly consists of 88 members who are directly elected by the public to serve eight-year terms, and all candidates must be vetted by the Guardian Council.

The assembly consists of 88 Mujtahids that are elected from lists of thoroughly vetted candidates (in 2016, 166 candidates were approved by the Guardians out of 801 who applied to run for the office), by direct public vote for eight-year terms. The number of members has ranged from 82 elected in 1982 to 88 elected in 2016. Current laws require the assembly to meet at least twice every six months. Half of the Guardian Council members are appointed by the supreme leader; this model has led to controversy as many reformist or opposition candidates are excluded, limiting voter choice.

According to article 111 of Iran's constitution "whenever the Leader becomes incapable of fulfilling his constitutional duties, or [loses] one of the qualifications mentioned in Articles 5 and 109, or it becomes known that he did not possess some of the qualifications initially, he will be dismissed."

On 3 March 2026, during the 2026 Iran war, the Israeli Air Force struck and damaged the Assembly of Experts office building in Qom.

== 1979 Assembly of Experts elections ==
As the 3 August 1979 elections for the Assembly of Experts drew near, Ruhollah Khomeini began to signal to Iranians which candidates they should support and which they should avoid. He characterized the opposition as "Westernized intellectuals, Marxists, and morally corrupt secular groups" who did not believe in Islam or who opposed the establishment of the Islamic Republic of Iran. The results of the Assembly of Experts election fulfilled Khomeini's objectives as 68 percent of the elected representatives were clerics, with 50 out of the 73 members being part of the clergy.

== Functions ==
=== In the constitution ===
According to Article 111 of the Iranian Constitution, the assembly is in charge of supervising, dismissing and electing the Supreme Leader.

Whenever the Leader becomes incapable of fulfilling his constitutional duties, or loses one of the qualifications mentioned in Articles 5 and 109, or it becomes known that he did not possess some of the qualifications initially, he will be dismissed. The authority of determination in this matter is vested with the experts specified in Article 108. In the event of the death, or resignation or dismissal of the Leader, the experts shall take steps within the shortest possible time for the appointment of the new Leader. ... Whenever the Leader becomes temporarily unable to perform the duties of leadership owing to his illness or any other incident, then during this period, the council mentioned in this Article shall assume his duties.

To choose the Supreme Leader, the Experts review qualified candidates and consult among themselves. According to the Constitution, the criteria of qualification for the office of the Supreme Leader include "Islamic scholarship, justice, piety, right political and social perspicacity, prudence, courage, administrative facilities and adequate capability for leadership." The jurist deemed as the most well-versed in Islamic regulations, in fiqh, or in political and social issues, most generally popular, or of other special prominence is chosen as Supreme Leader. Otherwise, in the absence of such a candidate, the Experts elect and declare one of their own as Supreme Leader.

Article 107 of the constitution states:

the task of appointing the Leader shall be vested with the experts elected by the people. The experts will review and consult among themselves concerning all the fuqaha' possessing the qualifications specified in Articles 5 and 109. In the event they find one of them better versed in Islamic regulations, the subjects of the fiqh, or in political and social issues, or possessing general popularity or special prominence for any of the qualifications mentioned in Article 109, they shall elect him as the Leader. Otherwise, in the absence of such a superiority, they shall elect and declare one of them as the Leader. The Leader thus elected by the Assembly of Experts shall assume all the powers of the wilayat al-amr and all the responsibilities arising therefrom.

Article 99 of the constitution declares "The Guardian Council has the responsibility of supervising the elections of the Assembly of Experts for Leadership". It also had the responsibility for setting up the first Assembly. The constitution does not specify requirements for candidacy for the Assembly of Experts, leaving the Assembly itself to put limits on who may run for membership. Article 108 states:

The law setting out the number and qualifications of the experts [mentioned in the preceding article], the mode of their election, and the code of procedure regulating the sessions during the first term must be drawn up by the fuqaha' on the first Guardian Council, passed by a majority of votes and then finally approved by the Leader of the Revolution. The power to make any subsequent change or a review of this law, or approval of all the provisions concerning the duties of the experts is vested in themselves.

The 1989 Iranian constitutional referendum removed the requirement for the leader to be a marja'. Ali Khamenei was not a marja' at that time.

=== Limits of power ===
How much actual power the Assembly has to supervise or oversee the Supreme Leader has been questioned. The assembly has never dismissed or even questioned a sitting Supreme Leader and, as all of its meetings and notes are strictly confidential, it has never been known to challenge or otherwise publicly oversee any of the Supreme Leader's decisions. All candidates to the Assembly (as well as the President and the Majlis or Parliament), are selected by the Guardian Council, half of whose members are selected by the Supreme Leader. Also, all directly elected members after the vetting process by the Guardian Council still have to be approved by the Supreme Leader.

Furthermore, there have been instances of Supreme Leader Ali Khamenei publicly criticizing members of the Assembly, resulting in that member's arrest and an end to their time on the Assembly—an example being Khamenei's denouncing of then-member of the Assembly Ahmad Azari Qomi as a "traitor" after the publishing of an open letter by Qomi criticizing Khamenei, resulting in Qomi's arrest and the eventual rejection by the Guardian Council of his candidacy for re-election to the Assembly.

=== Other rules ===
The assembly gathers every six months. Activities of the assembly include compiling a list of those eligible to become Supreme Leader in the event of the current Supreme Leader's death, resignation, or dismissal. This is done by the 107/109 commission. Monitoring the current leader to make sure he continues to meet all the criteria listed in the constitution is done by the 111 commission. Members of the Assembly report to this commission about the issues concerning the current Supreme Leader, and the commission can then order an emergency meeting of the Assembly. If the commission denies this, the members can ask the entire plenary of the Assembly (86 members) for a vote, and if most of the members vote in favor, an emergency meeting will be scheduled to discuss the current Supreme Leader. The meetings, meeting notes, and reports of the Assembly are confidential and not made available to anyone outside the assembly, except for the sitting Supreme Leader.

The assembly has passed laws to require all its members be experts in fiqh (Islamic jurisprudence), authorizing the Guardian Council to vet candidates for ijtihad proficiency using written and oral examinations. This law was challenged by the reformists, and their 2006 election campaign included changing this law to allow non-clerics into the assembly, and reforming the law that allows Guardian Council to vet candidates. Women (Mujtahidehs) are theoretically eligible to run for the Assembly of Experts and in 1998 nine women submitted their candidacy. The Guardian Council rejected them, arguing that they lacked qualifications in fiqh.

Currently, the average age of the members of the Assembly is over 60, which results in many mid-term elections due to deaths and resignations. Although members must be Ayatollahs, this is not the case for Mohsen Esmaeili.

Four-year elections were abandoned in 2023 in favor of eight-year terms.

=== Elections ===
The Assembly of Experts is formally elected by the people of Iran, but the candidates are rigorously vetted by the Guardian Council, a body made up of clerics and jurists who are appointed by the Supreme Leader. The Guardian Council has the power to disqualify candidates, often leaving only those who align with the ruling establishment. This system has led to accusations that the Assembly's elections are not truly democratic. Many reformist or opposition candidates are excluded from running, limiting voter choice to candidates who support the existing power structure.

== Political affiliation ==
Political affiliation is also an important indicator of changes in the Council of Experts. Two key non-partisan organizations are the Combatant Clergy Association and the Society of Seminary Teachers of Qom with their membership share being consistently ranged from 70% to 100%, with the exception of the 3rd convocation, where 54% of members belonged to the Combatant Clergy Association. The Society of Seminary Teachers of Qom did not participate in the 1998 elections, protesting the disqualification of its candidates by the Supervisory Council. It is important to understand the principles of the Iranian party system. The Combatant Clergy Association and the Society of Seminary Teachers of Qom, as clerical organizations, exist indefinitely, while all other classic parties, are created for specific elections and disbanded before the next one, to continue their work under a different name. Members of reformist or moderate parties appeared in the Council of Experts starting with the 3rd convocation. Initially, their share was 13%, but by the 5th convocation, it had reached 63%.

All parties present in the Assembly of Experts exist for one election cycle, then are replaced by others created for specific elections. Political affiliation based not by organization, but by faction indicates a long-term trend of a decreasing share of conservatives due to an increase in the share of moderates and reformers.

== Convocations ==
=== First Assembly (1983–1991) ===
The first elections for the Assembly of Experts of the Leadership were held in December 1982 and the Assembly first convened in 1983. 76 of the total of 83 members were elected in the first round, the rest in the second. The full list of members and election results is available on the Princeton Iran Data Portal.

As a number of members died, by-elections for replacement candidates were held in April 1988.

The Assembly was chaired throughout the term by Ayatollah Ali Meshkini, who chaired the Assembly also in subsequent terms until 2007.

In 1985, the Assembly chose Ayatollah Montazeri as the successor to Supreme Leader Grand Ayatollah Khomeini. But on 26 March 1989 Khomeini dismissed him in a letter: "[...]you are no longer eligible to succeed me as the legitimate leader of the state." Following Khomeini's death on 3 June 1989, the Assembly of Experts chose Ali Khamenei to be his successor as Supreme Leader in what proved to be a smooth transition. Initially, a council of three members, Ali Meshkini, Mousavi Ardabili and Ali Khamenei, were proposed for Leadership. After rejection of a Leadership Council by the assembly, and lack of votes for Grand Ayatollah Mohammad-Reza Golpaygani, Khamenei became the Supreme Leader by two-thirds of the votes.

=== Second Assembly (1991–1999) ===
The Second Assembly was also chaired by Ayatollah Ali Meshkini. The full list of members and election results is available on the Princeton Iran Data Portal.

=== Third Assembly (1999–2007) ===
The 3rd assembly was again chaired by Ayatollah Ali Meshkini, deputied by Ali Akbar Hashemi Rafsanjani, and Ayatollah Ebrahim Amini. The scribes were former Minister of Intelligence Ghorbanali Dorri-Najafabadi and Ahmad Khatami. The full list of members and election results is available on the Princeton Iran Data Portal.

=== Fourth Assembly (2007–2016) ===
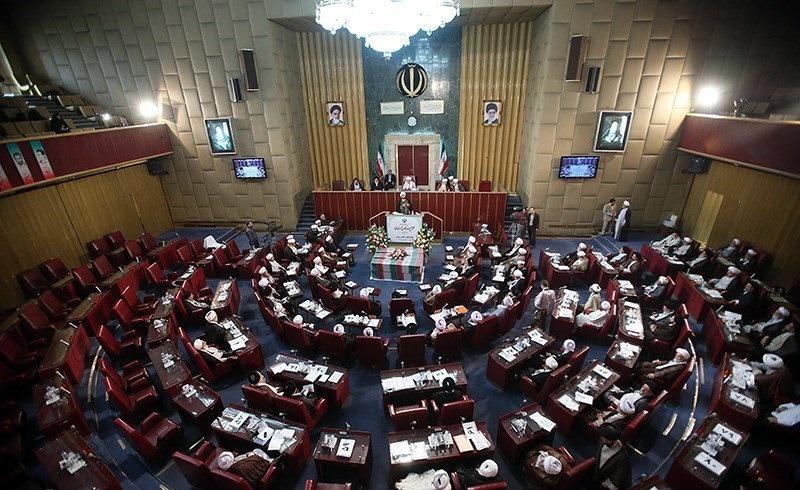
The first season in the year of 2013

The election for the fourth assembly took place on 15 December 2006 and the Assembly first convened on 19 February 2007. In July 2007, chairman Ayatollah Meshkini died, and Ayatollah Rafsanjani was elected to succeed him. On 8 March 2011, Ayatollah Mohammad-Reza Mahdavi Kani replaced Ayatollah Rafsanjani as chairman. On 4 June 2014, Mahdavi Kani fell into a coma after suffering a heart attack and died on 21 October 2014. He was succeeded by Mahmoud Hashemi Shahroudi as acting chairman.

The term was intended to last for ten years, rather than the usual eight, due to the "election aggregation" plan of the government put in place to allow the government to run elections simultaneously for the Assembly of Experts and the Parliament, thereby economizing election administration costs.

Assembly of Experts' Secretariate in Qom (destroyed by an Israeli air strike on 3 March 2026)

=== Fifth Assembly (2016–2024) ===
The election of 88 members of the Fifth Assembly took place on 26 February 2016 alongside of the election for 290 members of the Iranian Majlis (parliament). Those elected will sit for a projected 8-year term. The new assembly was opened on 24 May 2016 and selected Ahmad Jannati as chairman of the Fifth Assembly.

=== Sixth Assembly (2024–present) ===
The election of 88 members of the Sixth Assembly took place on 1 March 2024 alongside of the election for 290 members of the Iranian Majlis (parliament). Conservatives dominated the assembly elections Those elected will sit for a projected 8-year term. The new assembly was opened on 21 May 2024 and selected Mohammad-Ali Movahedi Kermani as chairman of the Sixth Assembly.

On 3 March 2026, during the 2026 Iran war, Israeli Air Force struck the Assembly of Experts office building in Qom.

Following the assassination of Ali Khamenei, the Assembly of Experts chose his son Mojtaba Khamenei to be a new Supreme Leader on 8 March 2026.

== Authority ==
The Assembly has never dismissed or even questioned the Supreme Leader. During the lengthy and unchallenged absolute rule of Ali Khamenei, many analysts asserted that the Assembly of Experts has become a ceremonial body without any real power. In 2015, Iran's then-Chief Justice Sadiq Larijani, a Khamenei appointee, stated that it is illegal for the Assembly of Experts to supervise Khamenei.

There have been instances when the current Supreme Leader's public criticism of members of the Assembly of Experts was followed by their arrest and dismissal. For example, Khamenei publicly called member of the Assembly of Experts Ahmad Azari Qomi a traitor, resulting in Qomi's arrest and eventual dismissal from the Assembly of Experts. Another instance is when Khamenei indirectly called Akbar Hashemi Rafsanjani a traitor for a statement he made, causing Rafsanjani to retract it. Mehdi Karroubi, who has been under house arrest since 2011 without trial, by the direct order of Khamenei, said that "the Assembly of Experts, a council of elected clerics charged with electing, supervising and even disqualifying the Supreme Leader, has turned into a ceremonial council that only praises the Leader".

The electoral process led by the Assembly of Experts has raised questions, as many of the major candidates are either members of the electing body or have faced disqualification from running for the Assembly itself. For instance, Alireza Arafi, a senior cleric and deputy chairman of the Assembly, Mahdi Mirbaqiri a current member, and Hassan Khomeini, who was disqualified from running for the Assembly in 2016, all feature prominently in the discussion.

== See also ==
- List of current members in the Assembly of Experts
- List of members in the First Term of the Council of Experts
- List of members in the Second Term of the Council of Experts
- List of members in the Third Term of the Council of Experts
- List of members in the Fourth Term of the Council of Experts
- List of members in the Fifth Term of the Council of Experts
- List of members in the Sixth Term of the Council of Experts
- National Conference for Unification – 1972–1980 South Korean governmental body
