= Results of the 2016 Iranian Assembly of Experts election =

This article contains the results of the 2016 Iranian Assembly of Experts election.

== Details ==
=== Razavi Khorasan (6) ===
Seats won by each list
List	Seats Won
The Two Societies	6
People's Experts/Hope	3
Total Seats	6

Razavi Khorasan province
#	Candidates (10)	Lists				Votes	%
#	Candidates (10)	CCA	SST	PE	R	Votes	%
1	Mahmoud Hashemi Shahroudi	Yes				1,499,109	53.91
2	Hassan Alemi	Yes		Yes	Yes	1,285,990	46.24
3	Ahmad Alamolhoda	Yes				1,235,565	44.43
4	Ahmad Hosseini-Khorasani	Yes		Yes	Yes	1,180,249	42.44
5	Mojtaba Hosseini	Yes				897,028	32.25
6	Mohammad-Hadi Abdekhodaei	Yes		Yes	Yes	873,143	31.40
7	Mohammad Saeidi-Golpayegani	Yes				728,894	26.21
8	Ali Ghorbani				Yes	681,131	24.49
9	Mahmoud Madani-Bajestani			Yes	Yes	675,809	24.30
10	Mohammad Mehdi Abbasi					132,586	4.76
Total Votes						2,780,639	

=== Khuzestan (6) ===
Seats won by each list
List	Seats Won
Combatant Clergy	5
Seminary Teachers	5
People's Experts/Hope	3
Total Seats	6

Khuzestan province
#	Candidates (7)	Lists				Votes	%
#	Candidates (7)	CCA	SST	PE	R	Votes	%
1	Mohammad Ali Mousavi Jazayeri	Yes	Yes	Yes	Yes	783,004	39.28
2	Abbas Kaebi	Yes	Yes			713,521	35.79
3	Mohsen Heidari Ale-Kathir	Yes	Yes			668,417	33.53
4	Ali Shafiei	Yes	Yes	Yes	Yes	606,294	30.41
5	Abdolkarim Farhani	Yes	Yes			551,502	27.66
6	Mohammad Hossein Ahmadi			Yes	Yes	448,825	22.51
7	Ali Fallahian	Yes				?	
Total Votes						1,993,259	

=== East Azerbaijan (5) ===
Seats won by each list
List	Seats Won
The Two Societies	4
People's Experts/Hope	4
Total Seats	5

East Azerbaijan province
#	Candidates (6)	Lists				Votes	%
#	Candidates (6)	CCA	SST	PE	R	Votes	%
1	Mohsen Mojtahed Shabestari	Yes				743,818	41.53
2	Ali Malakouti	Yes		Yes	Yes	688,700	38.45
3	Mohammad Taghi Pourmohammadi	Yes		Yes	Yes	570,445	31.85
4	Hashem Hashemzadeh Herisi			Yes	Yes	476,888	26.63
5	Mohammad Feyzi	Yes		Yes	Yes	415,041	23.17
6	Javad Hajizadeh	Yes				354,660	19.80
Blank or Invalid Votes						207,650	11.59
Total Votes						1,790,789	

=== Isfahan (5) ===
Seats won by each list
List	Seats Won
The Two Societies	5
People's Experts/Hope	2
Total Seats	5

Isfahan province
#	Candidates (14)	Lists				Votes	%
#	Candidates (14)	CCA	SST	PE	R	Votes	%
1	Yousef Tabatabaei	Yes		Yes	Yes	1,041,564	52.70
2	Abolhassan Mahdavi	Yes				840,238	42.52
3	Morteza Moghtadaei	Yes		Yes	Yes	825,371	41.76
4	Abdolnabi Namazi	Yes				822,961	41.64
5	Mahmoud Abdollahi	Yes				491,974	24.89
6	Mohammad Omumi					369,729	18.71
7	Abdolrasoul Ghassemi-Kajani			Yes	Yes	363,121	18.37
8	Hassan Shariati-Niasar			Yes	Yes	353,805	17.90
9	Mohammad Ali Faqihi					324,772	16.43
10	Hamid Elahidoust					287,360	14.54
11	Mohsen Faqihi					126,569	6.40
—	Asghar Matinpour				Yes	—	
Blank or Invalid Votes						283,024	14.32
Total Votes						1,976,061	

=== Fars (5) ===
Seats won by each list
List	Seats Won
The Two Societies	3
People's Experts/Hope	3
Total Seats	5

Fars province
#	Candidates (8)	Lists				Votes
#	Candidates (8)	CCA	SST	PE	R	Votes
1	Ali-Asghar Dastgheib	Yes		Yes	Yes	1,537,081
2	Ahmad Beheshti	Yes		Yes	Yes	1,023,064
3	Asadollah Imani	Yes				955,206
4	Mohammad Faqih			Yes	Yes	560,614
5	Ali-Akabar Kalantari					555,939
6	Ali Sheikh-Movahed	Yes		Yes	Yes	527,092
7	Gholamali Safaei-Boushehri	Yes				525,597
8	Ali Edalat			Yes	Yes	443,412
Total Votes						2,151,847

=== Provinces with 4 seats and less ===
#	Candidates	Lists				Votes
#	Candidates	CCA	SST	PE	R	Votes
Gilan province (4)
1	Ali Hosseini-Eshkevari	Yes		Yes	Yes	354,918
2	Zeinolabedin Ghorbani	Yes	Yes	Yes	Yes	331,283
3	Reza Ramezani	Yes	Yes	Yes	Yes	330,606
4	Ahmad Parvaei					305,073
5	Mehdi Rahnama					249,471
6	Sadegh Alamolhoda			Yes	Yes	194,679
7	Hossein Radayi					69,005
Total Votes						1,173,241
Mazandaran province (4)
1	Sadegh Larijani	Yes				682,817
2	Nourollah Tabarsi	Yes		Yes	Yes	612,673
3	Ali Moallemi	Yes				556,750
4	Rahim Tavakkol			Yes	Yes	488,817
5	Akbar Seifi-Mazandarani	Yes				345,058
6	Sadegh Pishnamazi			Yes	Yes	275,018
7	Hossein Goli-Shirdar			Yes	Yes	184,472
Total Votes						1,618,263
West Azerbaijan province (3)
1	Ali Akbar Ghoreishi	Yes				822,027
2	Asgar Dirbaz	Yes				397,407
3	Javad Mojtahed Shabestari					247,240
4	Mansour Mazaheri-Krouni			Yes	Yes	237,279
5	Abbas Rafati	Yes				176,052
Total Votes						1,511,652
Kerman province (3)
1	Ahmad Khatami	Yes				701,972
2	Mohammad Bahrami-Khoshkar	Yes		Yes	Yes	672,608
3	Amanollah Alimoradi	Yes		Yes	Yes	559,656
4	Jalil Sadr-Tabatabaei			Yes	Yes	486,107
5	Ahmad Shaykh Bahāʾī					224,059
Total Votes						1,310,234
Ardabil province (2)
1	Hassan Ameli	Yes		Yes	Yes	382,854
2	Fakhraddin Mousavi			Yes	Yes	254,462
3	Sadegh Mohammadi-Jazeyi	Yes				?
Total Votes						612,320
Alborz province (2)
1	Mohammad-Mehdi Mirbagheri	Yes				348,431
2	Mohsen Kazeroun	Yes		Yes	Yes	282,856
3	Sadegh Razzaghi			Yes	Yes	234,398
4	Mohammad-Ali Modarresi Mosalla	Yes				183,777
5	Hossein Tajabadi					56,357
6	Ali Rahmanifard					55,170
Total Votes						800,257
Sistan and Baluchestan province (2)
1	Ali-Ahmadi Salami (Note: Belongs to Iran's Sunni community.)	Yes		Yes	Yes	732,289
2	Abbasali Soleimani	Yes		Yes	Yes	417,867
3	Mohammad Hossein Bayati					201,088
Total Votes						1,117,261
Qazvin province (2)
1	Ali Eslami	Yes				291,051
2	Majid Talkhabi			Yes	Yes	209,726
3	Mahmoud Rajabi	Yes				170,612
Total Votes						539,543
Kurdistan province (2)
1	Faegh Rostami			Yes	Yes	144,513
2	Anvar Adami					136,359
3	Abdolrahman Khodaei		Yes	Yes	Yes	135,341
4	Mohammad Hosseini-Shahroudi		Yes			133,877
5	Eghbal Bahmani					124,749
Total Votes						620,458
Kermanshah province (2)
1	Amanollah Narimani			Yes	Yes	381,623
2	Mahmoud Mahmoudi-Araghi	Yes		Yes	Yes	272,292
3	Alireza Mostashari					263,438
4	Hassan Mamdouhi	Yes				250,382
Total Votes (Excluding blank or invalid votes)						448,355
Golestan province (2)
1	Kazem Nourmofidi	Yes		Yes	Yes	486,286
2	Abdolhadi Mortazavi-Shahroudi	Yes		Yes	Yes	365,881
3	Hosseinali Saʾdī					296,133
Total Votes						1,148,300
Markazi province (2)
1	Mohsen Araki	Yes				242,146
2	Ahmad Mohseni Gorgani	Yes		Yes	Yes	207,655
3	Kazem Sepasi-Ashtiani					182,231
4	Javad Mousavi			Yes	Yes	176,207
5	Ahmad Momen					32,960
Total Votes						634,545
Hamedan province (2)
1	Mostafa Mousavi	Yes				441,321
2	Ghiassedin Mohammadi	Yes		Yes	Yes	319,656
3	Ali Razini			Yes	Yes	≈215,000
4	Habibollah Shaʾbani					≈187,000
Total Votes						845,253
Luristan province (2)
1	Ahmad Moballeghi	Yes		Yes	Yes	400,732
2	Hashem Niazi	Yes				382,523
3	Mohammad-Naghi Shahrokhi			Yes	Yes	345,663
Total Votes						884,144
Ilam province (1)
1	Mohsen Saeidi	Yes				136,919
2	Mehdi Khatibi					81,962
Total Votes						323,811
Bushehr province (1)
1	Hashem Boushehri	Yes		Yes	Yes	374,147
2	Gholamreza Fayyazi					33,149
Blank or Invalid Votes (Note: According to local media, more than 90% (≈55,000) of invalid ballots were votes to Hassan Khomeini, who was disqualified from running in Tehran by the Guardian Council.)						60,659
Total Votes						467,945
Chaharmahal and Bakhtiari province (1)
1	Alireza Eslamian	Yes				245,278
2	Reza Mokhtari-Esfidvajani			Yes	Yes	162,673
3	Mohammad Ali Khazayili					16,673
Total Votes						424,747
South Khorasan province (1)
1	Ebrahim Raeesi	Yes				325,048
2	Ebrahim Rabbani			Yes	Yes	81,083
Total Votes						406,131
North Khorasan province (1)
1	Habibollah Mehmannavaz	Yes				176,136
2	Ali Mohammadi-Khorasani			Yes	Yes	126,775
3	Hamid Havali-Shahriari					110,773
Total Votes						448,355
Zanjan province (1)
1	Mohammad Reza Doulabi		Yes			193,558
2	Esmaeil Nouri-Zanjani	Yes		Yes	Yes	175,498
3	Abdollah Amirkhani					76,932
Total Votes						445,989
Semnan province (1)
1	Mohammad Shahcheraghi	Yes		Yes		224,215
2	Abdolamir Khattat					48,424
Total Votes						325,049
Qom province (1)
1	Mohammad Momen	Yes				333,149
2	Maysam Doust-Mohammadi (Note: Born in 1991 (1370 SH) was the youngest candidate qualified by the Guardian Council with 24 years old and was an unknown figure.)					43,625
Total Votes						472,549
Kohgiluyeh and Boyerahmad province (1)
1	Sharafeddin Malek-Hosseini	Yes		Yes	Yes	327,864
2	Mohammad Kazem Mousavinasab					36,881
Total Votes						400,617
Hormozgan province (1)
1	Ruhollah Sadrossadati					420,699
2	Gholamali Naeimabadi	Yes		Yes	Yes	271,231 (Note: According to "unofficial" results published by Tabnak, he has gained 271,231 votes.)
Total Votes						763,152
Yazd province (1)
1	Abolghassem Vafi	Yes		Yes	Yes	328,206
2	Mohammad Reza Mohassel					101,325
Total Votes						429,531
