= 2021 Assembly of Experts by-election in Tehran province =

A by-election was held on 18 June 2021 for three vacant seats of the Assembly of Experts in Tehran Province, caused by death of Ebrahim Amini, Hashem Bathaie and Mohammad-Ali Taskhiri. It was held along with three other elections, including the presidential election, the city council election and the parliamentary by-election.

Like the by-election held the previous year, it was an uncontested election without presence of rival moderates who had won the 2016 election by a landslide. As expected, it resulted in victory of all three candidates supported by The Two Societies.

The number of invalid votes cast in the election and its turnout were not officially declared by the authorities.

== Campaign ==
Heydar Moslehi, Iran's former intelligence minister who ran as a candidate, tried to launch a high-profile campaign by giving controversial interviews. He made an embarrassment for the establishment when he revealed that he ordered the Guardian Council to disqualify Akbar Hashemi Rafsanjani from the 2013 presidential elections due to surveys showing he will win at least 60% of the votes.

== Results ==
#	Candidate	Electoral list		Votes	%	Notes
#	Candidate	CCA	SST	Votes	%	Notes
1	Alireza Arafi	check	check	1,029,372	34.75	Elected
2	Hossein-Ali Sa'di	check	check	656,011	22.15	Elected
3	Ahmad Momen	check	check	584,549	19.73	Elected
4	Heydar Moslehi			444,035	14.99	Defeated
5	Ali Razini			237,444	8.02	Defeated
6	Ali Rahmanifar			190,348	6.43	Defeated
7	Ahmad Mousavi-Vadeghani			186,963	6.31	Defeated
8	Ali Gharibdoust			154,762	5.22	Defeated
9	Hamid Shahriari			125,588	4.24	Defeated
10	Mansour Mazaheri-Karvani			72,331	2.44	Defeated
11	Kazem Sepasi-Ashtiani			65,140	2.20	Defeated
12	Reza Mohagheghian-Gourtani			16,985	0.57	Defeated
Blank/Invalid Votes				Not Declared		
Total Votes				2,962,047	100	
Source: Tehran Province Governorate
