= 2006 Iranian Assembly of Experts election in Tehran province =

2006 Assembly of Experts election
- 15 December 2006
- Turnout: 47%
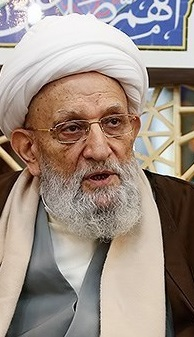

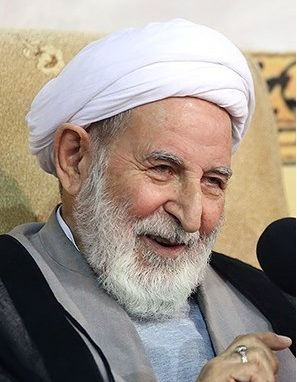

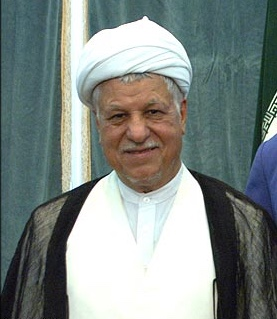

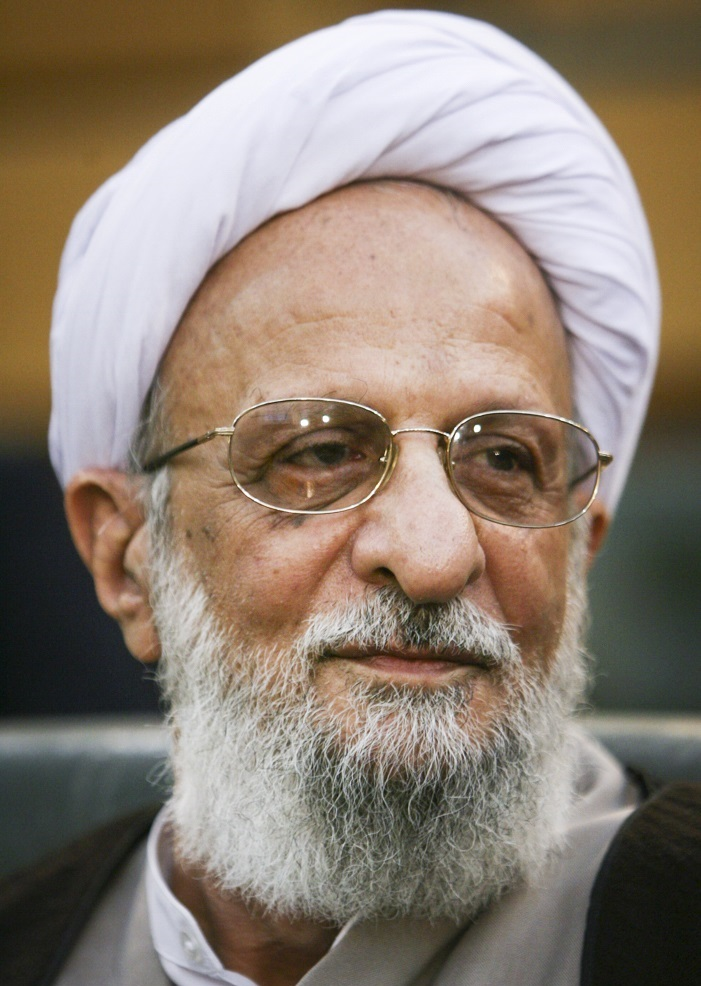

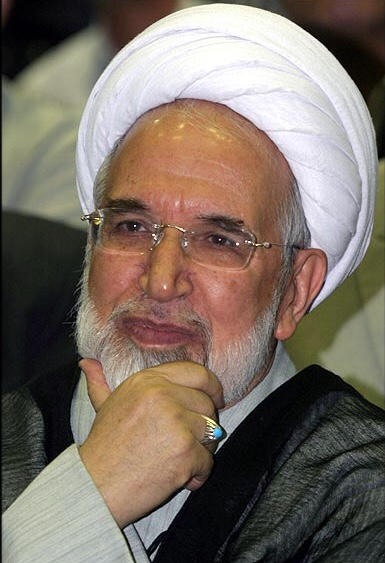

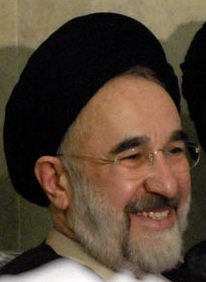

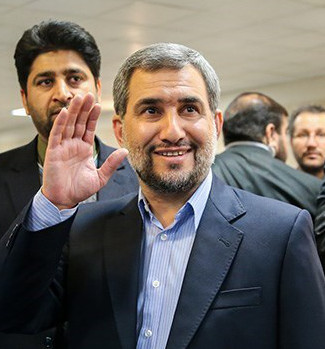
	Majority party	Minority party	Third party
Leader	Mahdavi Kani & Yazdi	Akbar Hashemi Rafsanjani	Mohammad-Taqi Mesbah-Yazdi
Party	Parties: CCA; SST	Moderation and Development Party	—
Alliance	The Two Societies	—	Elites of Seminary and University
Seats won	14 / 16	11 / 16	8 / 16
	Fourth party	Fifth party	Sixth party
Leader	Mehdi Karroubi	Mohammad Khatami	Mohsen Esmaeili
Party	National Trust Party	Parties: ECP; ILP; WH; IIYP	—
Alliance	—	Reformists Coalition	Coalition of Experts and Effectiveness
Seats won	8 / 16	7 / 16	4 / 16

This is an overview of the 2006 Iranian Assembly of Experts election in Tehran Province.

The voter turnout was declared 47% in the constituency.

== Results ==
#	Candidate	Lists										Votes	%	Notes
#	Candidate	RC	NTP	WIR	MDP	CEE	CPE	CCA	SST	DIR	ESU	Votes	%	Notes
1	Akbar Hashemi Rafsanjani	check	check	check	check		check	check		check		1,564,197	42.21	Elected
2	Mohammad Emami-Kashani			check	check		check	check		check		1,027,767	27.73	Elected
3	Ali Meshkini		check	check	check		check	check		check	check	1,015,500	27.40	Elected
4	Mohammad Yazdi			check		check	check	check		check	check	970,192	26.18	Elected
5	Ahmad Jannati				check		check	check		check	check	929,403	25.08	Elected
6	Taqi Mesbah-Yazdi						check	check		check	check	879,883	23.74	Elected
7	Hassan Rouhani	check	check	check	check		check	check				844,190	22.78	Elected
8	Qorbanali Dorri-Najafabadi	check		check	check	check	check	check		check		736,387	19.87	Elected
9	Mohsen Kazerouni		check		check			check		check		716,828	19.34	Elected
10	Mohsen Kharazi	check	check	check	check		check	check		check	check	688,212	18.57	Elected
11	Reza Ostadi	check			check	check	check	check		check	check	650,391	17.55	Elected
12	Abdolnabi Namazi							check		check	check	602,096	16.25	Elected
13	Mohammad-Bagher Bagheri	check	check					check		check		598,352	16.15	Elected
14	Mohammad M. Gilani		check	check	check			check		check	check	574,688	15.51	Elected
15	Mohsen Qomi	check	check	check	check	check	check					543,951	14.68	Elected
16	Mohammad-Hassan Marashi			check								518,129	13.98	Elected
17	Mohammad-Reza Tavassoli	check		check	check							494,820	13.35	Defeated
18	Mohsen Mousavi-Tabrizi	check	check									493,015	13.30	Defeated
19	Gholamreza Mesbahi M.							check		check		458,903	12.38	Defeated
20	Gholamreza Rezvani	check		check	check			check				452,219	12.20	Defeated
21	Azizollah Khoshvaght									check	check	450,332	12.15	Defeated
22	Hashem Hashemzadeh Herisi	check	check	check	check							439,908	11.87	Defeated
23	Mohammad-Hassan Zali		check			check	check					400,808	10.82	Defeated
24	Ali Momenpour	check		check							check	374,691	10.11	Defeated
25	Mohsen Esmaeili		check			check	check			check		368,370	9.94	Defeated
26	Abolhassan Navvab				check	check	check					347,511	9.38	Defeated
27	Abbas-Ali Akhtari										check	329,183	8.88	Defeated
28	Hashem Bathaei		check									327,155	8.83	Defeated
29	Mehdi Hadavi-Tehrani		check			check	check					288,213	7.78	Defeated
30	Abbas H. Ghaemmaghami		check		check	check	check					276,572	7.46	Defeated
31	Mohammad-Ali Amin		check									232,152	6.26	Defeated
32	Ahmad Mousavi-Vadeghani											194,073	5.24	Defeated
Blank or Invalid Votes												Unknown		
Total Votes												3,705,833	100.0	
Results: Ministry of Interior / Lists: IRNA, Fars
