= 1998 Iranian Assembly of Experts election in Tehran province =

1998 Assembly of Experts election
← 1990	23 October 1998	2006 →
- Turnout: 39.45%
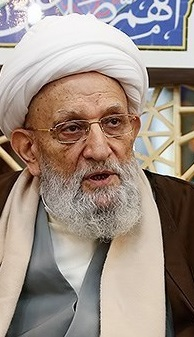

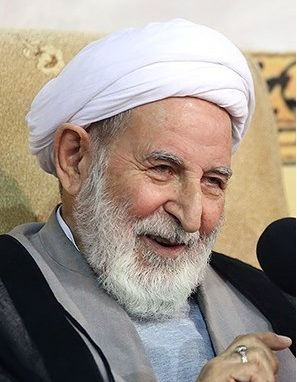

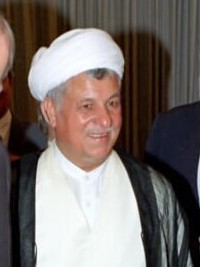
	Majority party	Minority party
Leader	Mahdavi Kani & Yazdi	Akbar Hashemi Rafsanjani
Party	Combatant Clergy Association & Society of Seminary Teachers of Qom	Executives of Construction Party
Seats won	13 / 16	9 / 16

The third elections for the Assembly of Experts in Tehran Province was held on 23 October 1998 to elect 16 representatives in the constituency. The result was a victory for the conservatives. Allied institutions the Combatant Clergy Association and the Society of Seminary Teachers of Qom supported candidates jointly, while the Association of Combatant Clerics and the Assembly of Qom Seminary Scholars and Researchers whose most members were disqualified by the Guardian Council did not support any candidates. Executives of Construction Party was the only reformist group that competed in the election.

The voter turnout was declared 39.45% in the constituency.

== Results ==
#	Candidate	Electoral list(s)			Votes	%	Notes
#	Candidate	ECP	CCA	SST	Votes	%	Notes
1	Akbar Hashemi Rafsanjani	check	check	check	1,682,882	60.10	Elected
2	Ali Meshkini	check	check	check	1,240,524	44.30	Elected
3	Mohammad Reyshahri	check	check	check	1,212,249	43.29	Elected
4	Mohammad Emami-Kashani	check	check	check	1,179,566	42.12	Elected
5	Mohammad Yazdi		check	check	1,124,620	40.16	Elected
6	Ahmad Jannati		check	check	1,047,232	37.40	Elected
7	Mohammad-Reza Tavassoli	check			931,845	33.28	Elected
8	Mohammad-Taqi Mesbah-Yazdi		check	check	889,065	31.75	Elected
9	Ghorbanali Dorri-Najafabadi		check	check	882,672	31.52	Elected
10	Majid Ansari	check			835,037	29.82	Elected
11	Mohsen Kharazi	check	check	check	765,802	27.35	Elected
12	Bagher Asadi-Khonsari		check	check	764,633	27.31	Elected
13	Mohammad Mohammadi-Gilani	check	check	check	693,173	24.75	Elected
14	Reza Ostadi		check	check	636,651	22.74	Elected
15	Mohsen Qomi	check			633,774	22.63	Elected
16	Gholamreza Rezvani		check	check	606,735	21.67	Elected
	Mohammad-Javad Hojjati-Kermani	check			Unknown		Defeated
	Ali Hojjati-Kermani	check			Unknown		Defeated
	Mousavi-Bojnourdi	check			Unknown		Defeated
	Saghafi	check			Unknown		Defeated
	Ma'refat	check			Unknown		Defeated
	Ghazizadeh	check			Unknown		Defeated
	Marvi	check			Unknown		Defeated
	Anvari		check	check	Unknown		Defeated
	Mohammad Momen		check	check	Unknown		Defeated
	Hossein Rasti-Kashani		check	check	Unknown		Defeated
Blank Votes					85,047	3.04	
Invalid Votes					68,689	2.45	
Total Votes					2,800,267	100	
Source: Results via IRNA / lists via IRNA, Hamshahri and Hamshahri
