= 2009 Assembly of Experts by-election in Tehran province =

2009 Tehran Province by-election
← 2008	12 June 2009	2016 →

The vacant seat to the Assembly of Experts
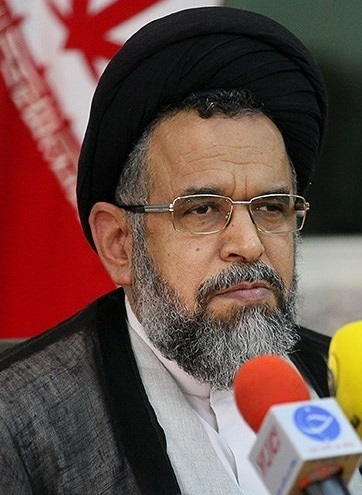

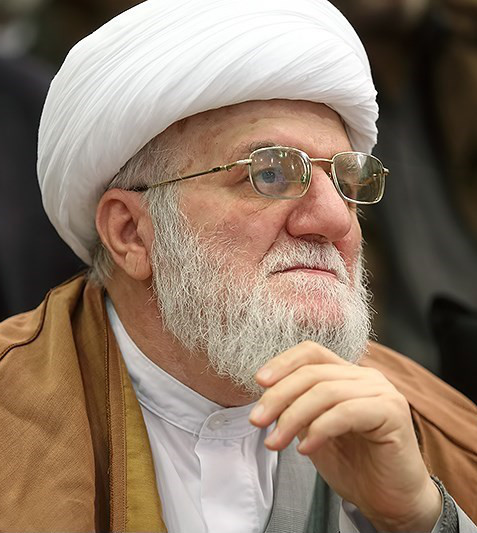
Candidate	Mahmoud Alavi	Mohammad-Ali Taskhiri
Party	—	Combatant Clergy Association
Popular vote	2,636,032
Percentage	45.09%
Subsequent Member
Mahmoud Alavi

A by-election was held on 12 June 2009 for the vacant seat of the Assembly of Experts in Tehran Province, caused by death of Mohammad-Hassan Marashi. It was held along with the 2009 Iranian presidential election.

The seat was won by Mahmoud Alavi, who gained more than 2.6 millions out of 5.8 millions of votes cast. He was not supported by major clerical organizations, The Two Societies had endorsed Mohammad-Ali Taskhiri.

== Result ==
#	Candidate	Electoral list		Votes	%	Notes
#	Candidate	CCA	SST	Votes	%	Notes
1	Mahmoud Alavi			2,636,032	45.09	Elected
	Mohammad-Ali Taskhiri	check	check			Defeated
	Fakhraddin Mousavi					Defeated
	Hashem Bathaei					Defeated
	Mohammad-Ali Amin					Defeated
	Mehdi Hadavi-Moghaddam					Defeated
Blank/Invalid Votes						
Total Votes				5,846,107	100	
Source: ISNA / Mehr News Agency / IRNA
