= 2016 Iranian Assembly of Experts election in Tehran province =

2016 Assembly of Experts election
- 26 February 2016
- Turnout: 53.11%
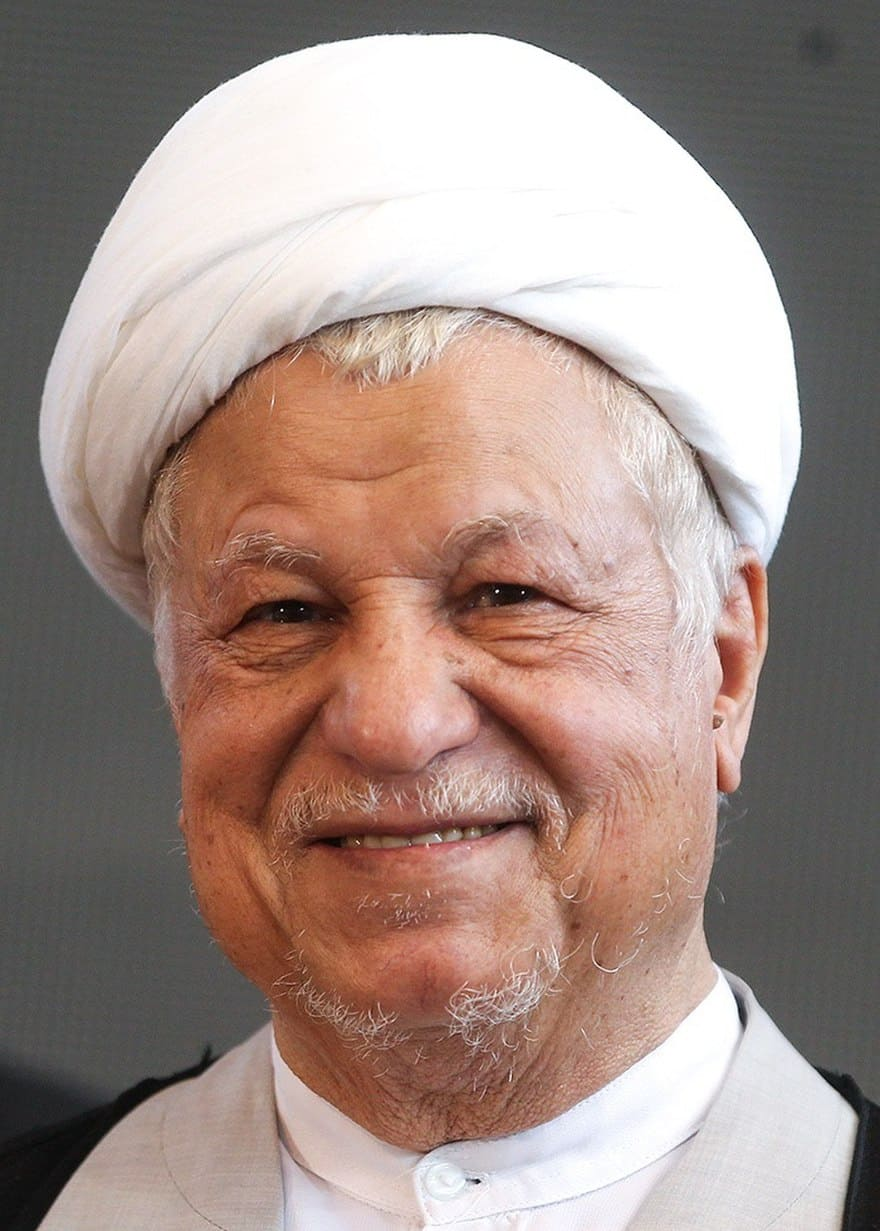

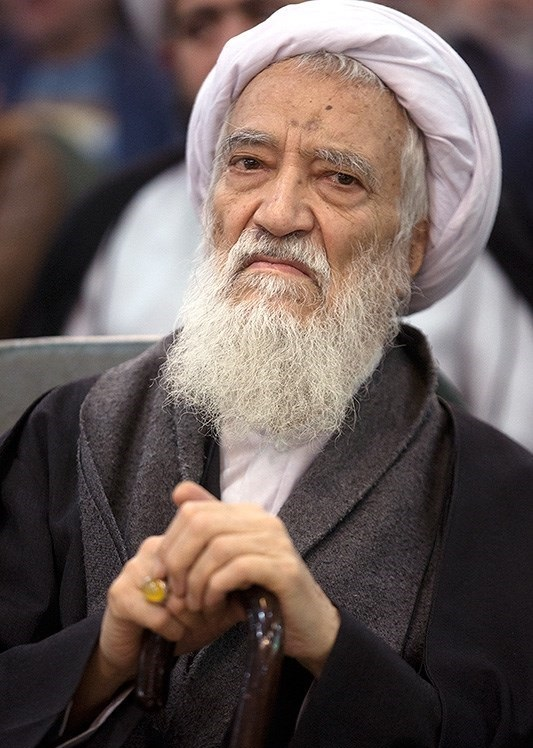

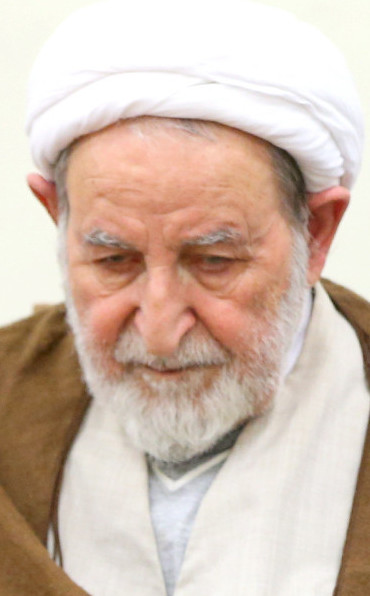
	Majority party	Minority party	Third party
Leader	Akbar Hashemi Rafsanjani	Mohammad-Ali Movahedi-Kermani	Mohammad Yazdi
Party	People's Experts	Combatant Clergy Association	Society of Seminary Teachers
Leader's seat	1st	5th	Defeated
Seats won	15 / 16	11 / 16	9 / 16

This is an overview of the 2016 Iranian Assembly of Experts election in Tehran Province.

The voter turnout was 53.11% in the constituency.

== Results ==
#	Candidate	Lists				Votes	%	Notes
#	Candidate	PE	FM	CCA	SST	Votes	%	Notes
1	Akbar Hashemi Rafsanjani	check	check	check	—N/a	2,305,419	51.22	Elected
2	Mohammed Emami-Kashani	check	check	check	check	2,286,447	50.80	Elected
3	Hassan Rouhani	check	check	check	check	2,243,687	49.85	Elected
4	Mohsen Qomi	check	check	check	check	2,236,953	49.70	Elected
5	Mohammad-Ali Movahedi-Kermani	check	check	check	check	2,134,963	47.43	Elected
6	Ghorbanali Dorri-Najafabadi	check	check	check	check	2,059,246	45.75	Elected
7	Mohammad Reyshahri	check	check	check	check	1,976,567	43.91	Elected
8	Abolfazl Mir-Mohammadi	check	check	check	check	1,973,842	43.85	Elected
9	Ebrahim Amini	check	check	check	check	1,907,332	42.38	Elected
10	Mahmoud Alavi	check	check	—N/a		1,712,970	38.06	Elected
11	Nasrallah Shah-Abadi	check	—N/a			1,449,313	32.20	Elected
12	Mohammad-Ali Taskhiri	check	check	check	—N/a	1,449,083	32.20	Elected
13	Mohsen Esmaeili	check	check	—N/a		1,424,375	31.65	Elected
14	Mohammad-Hassan Zali	check	check	—N/a		1,360,379	30.22	Elected
15	Hashem Bathaie Golpayegani	check	check	—N/a		1,331,056	29.57	Elected
16	Ahmad Jannati	—N/a		check	check	1,329,625	29.54	Elected
17	Mohammad Yazdi	—N/a		check	check	1,250,082	27.77	Defeated
18	Mohammad Sajjadi Ata-Abadi	check	check	—N/a		1,221,694	27.14	Defeated
19	Mohammad-Taqi Mesbah-Yazdi	—N/a		check	check	1,020,605	22.68	Defeated
20	Mohammad-Bagher Bagheri	—N/a		check	check	982,140	21.82	Defeated
21	Ali Momenpour	—N/a			check	970,961	21.57	Defeated
22	Gholamreza Mesbahi-Moghadam	—N/a		check	check	949,226	21.09	Defeated
23	Alireza Arafi	—N/a		check	check	925,727	20.57	Defeated
24	Abbas-Ali Akhtari	—N/a				911,289	20.25	Defeated
25	Mohammad Reza Modarresi-Yazdi	—N/a		check	check	864,077	19.20	Defeated
26	Mohammad-Ali Amin	—N/a	check	—N/a		337,522	7.50	Defeated
27	Hashem Hamidi	—N/a		check	—N/a	223,260	4.96	Defeated
28	Hamed Taheri	—N/a				136,678	3.04	Defeated
Blank or Invalid Votes						322,370	7.16	
Total Votes						4,500,894	100.0	
Sources: Official Results, Lists: PE FM CCA SST, Blank/invalid votes: BBC
