= 2020 Assembly of Experts by-election in Tehran province =

A by-election was held on 21 February 2020 for three vacant seats of the Assembly of Experts in Tehran Province, caused by death of Akbar Hashemi Rafsanjani, Nasrollah Shahabadi and Abolfazl Mirmohammadi. It was held along with the 2020 Iranian legislative election.

In contrast to the competitive 2016 election which the moderate list had won by a landslide, it was an uncontested election without presence of such candidates and resulted in victory of all three candidates supported by The Two Societies.

The number of invalid votes cast in the election and its turnout were not officially declared by the authorities.

== Results ==
#	Candidate	Electoral list		Votes	%	Notes
#	Candidate	CCA	SST	Votes	%	Notes
1	Ali Momenpour	check	check	963,605		Elected
2	Abbas-Ali Akhtari	check	check	961,773		Elected
3	Gholamreza Mesbahi-Moghadam	check	check	708,774		Elected
4	Hossein-Ali Sa'di			487,605		Defeated
5	Gholam-Abbas Haghemi			243,801		Defeated
6	Ali Rahmanifar			194,126		Defeated
7	Ali Razini			176,024		Defeated
8	Seyyed Sadegh Mohammadi			159,792		Defeated
9	Mohammad-Ali Amin			158,453		Defeated
10	Hamid Shahriari			122,095		Defeated
11	Ahmad Mousavi-Vadeghani			115,700		Defeated
12	Mohammad-Ali Khazayili			90,875		Defeated
13	Hossein Radaei			79,925		Defeated
14	Mohammad-Sajjad Mousavi			60,214		Defeated
Blank/Invalid Votes				Not Declared		
Valid Votes				1,924,015		
Total Votes				Not Declared	100	
Source: Tehran Province Governorate / Ministry of Interior / ISNA
