= 2008 Assembly of Experts by-election in Tehran province =

2008 Tehran Province by-election
← 2006	14 March 2008	2009 →

The vacant seat to the Assembly of Experts
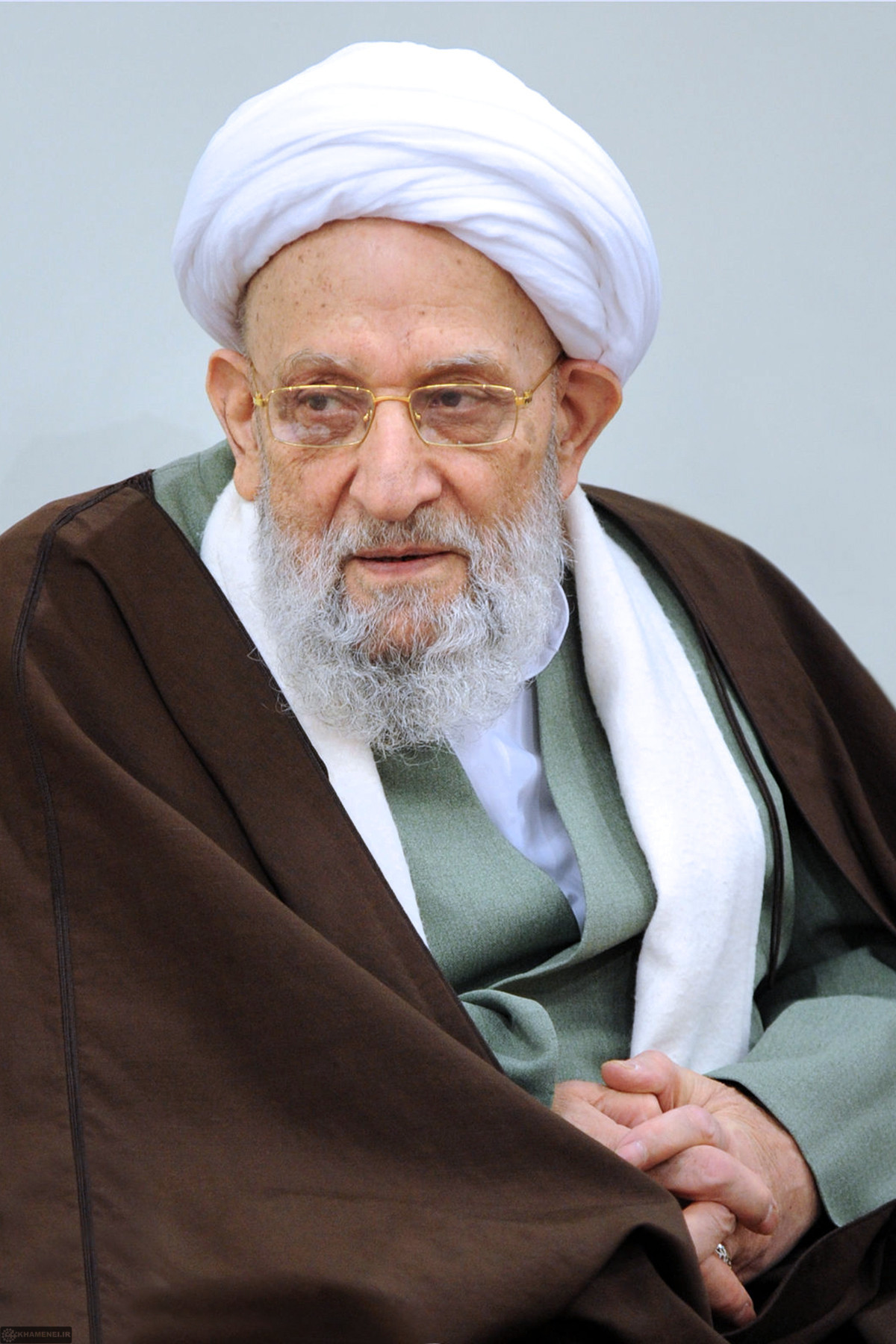

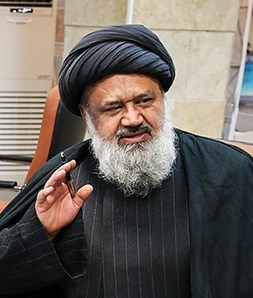
Candidate	Mohammad-Reza Mahdavi Kani	Mohammad-Ali Amin
Party	Combatant Clergy Association	—
Popular vote	1,445,554	343,825
Percentage	50.22%	11.94%
Subsequent Member
Mohammad-Reza Mahdavi Kani

A by-election was held on 14 March 2008 for the vacant seat of the Assembly of Experts in Tehran Province, caused by death of Ali Meshkini who held office as chairman of the assembly. It was held along with the 2008 Iranian legislative election.

The seat was won by conservative Mohammad-Reza Mahdavi Kani, the secretary-general of Combatant Clergy Association, who was endorsed by Society of Seminary Teachers of Qom in addition to his own organization. The parliamentary electoral alliance United Front of Principlists also supported him.

The candidate supported by the reformists ended up in the third place.

== Result ==
#	Candidate	Electoral list				Votes	%	Notes
#	Candidate	CCA	SST	UFP	RC	Votes	%	Notes
1	Mohammad-Reza Mahdavi Kani	check	check	check		1,445,554	50.22	Elected
2	Mohammad-Ali Amin					343,825	11.94	Defeated
3	Mohammad Sajjadi Ata-Abadi				check	167,396	5.82	Defeated
4	Ahmad Mousavi-Vadeghani					111,745	3.88	Defeated
Blank/Invalid Votes						809,891	28.14	
Total Votes						2,878,411	100	
Source: IRNA / E'temad newspaper
