= Mohsen Mojtahed Shabestari =

Iranian Ayatollah (1937-2021)

- محسن مجتهد شبستری
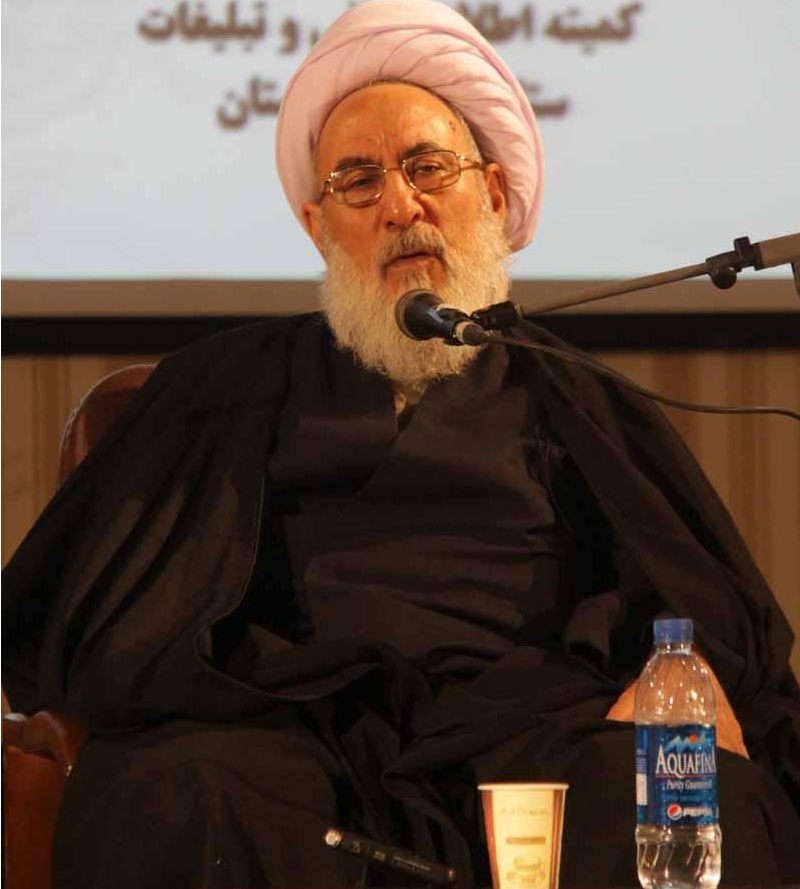

Representative of the Supreme Leader in East Azerbaijan and Friday Prayers Imam of Tabriz
- In office 1995 – 31 May 2017
- Appointed by: Ali Khamenei
- Preceded by: Moslem Malakouti
- Succeeded by: Mohammad Ali Ale-Hashem

Member of the Assembly of Experts
- In office 15 August 1983 – 17 November 2021
- Constituency: East Azerbaijan
- Majority: 743,818 (5th)

Member of the Parliament of Iran
- In office 28 May 1992 – 26 May 2000
- Constituency: Tehran, Rey, Shemiranat and Eslamshahr
- Majority: 1,025,639
- In office 28 May 1980 – 26 May 1988
- Constituency: Tehran, Rey, Shemiranat and Eslamshahr
- Majority: 1,159,662

Personal details
- Born: 1937 Shabestar, Iran
- Died: 17 November 2021 (aged 83–84) Tehran, Iran
- Party: Combatant Clergy Association
- Children: Javad Mojtahed Shabestari
- Relatives: Mohammad Mojtahed Shabestari (brother)
- Education: Qom Hawza

Ayatollah Mohsen Mojtahed Shabestari (Persian: محسن مجتهد شبستری; 1937 – 17 November 2021) was an Iranian Shiite cleric and politician. He was a member of the 1st, 2nd, 3rd, 4th and 5th Assembly of Experts from the East Azerbaijan electorate. 4th term Mojtahed Shabestari won with 671,254 and last period 743,818 votes. He was MP of Islamic Consultative Assembly in the electoral district of Tehran in the beginning of the revolution for first, second, fourth and fifth terms.

He was also Representative of the Supreme Leader in East Azerbaijan and fourth imam Jumu'ah for Tabriz in northwest of Iran after Iranian Revolution from 1995 until his resignation in 2017. Mojtahed Shabestari was a member of Ahl Al-Bayt World Assembly. His son Javad Mojtahed Shabestari is member of the Assembly of Experts from the West Azerbaijan.

Shabestari died in Tehran on 17 November 2021.

== See also ==
- List of ayatollahs
- List of members in the First Term of the Council of Experts

Political offices
Preceded by Moslem Malakouti	Imam Jumu'ah of Tabriz and Representative of the Supreme Leader; 1995–2017	Succeeded by Mohammad Ali Ale-Hashem
