= Dirbaz =

Dirbaz (Persian: دیرباز) is a Persian surname. Notable people with the surname include:

- Asghar Dirbaz (born 1959), Iranian Shiite cleric, author, and politician
- Kambiz Dirbaz (born 1975), Iranian actor
