= Asgar Dirbaz =

Iranian cleric (born 1959)

عسگر دیرباز Asghar Dirbaz
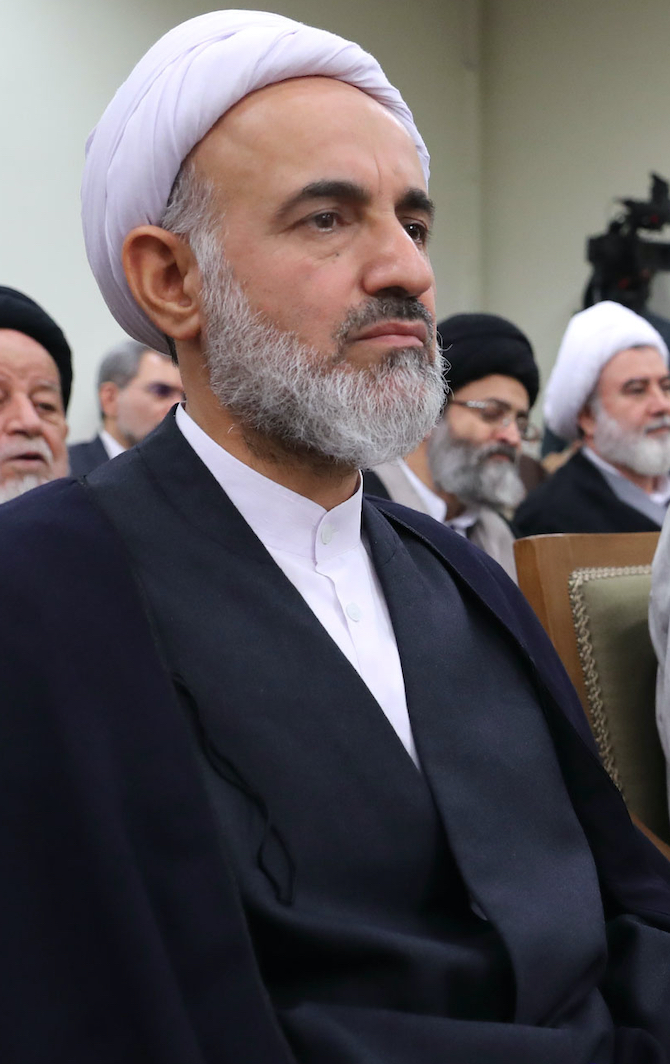
- Asghar Dirbaz during a meeting in the fifth term of Assembly of Experts in 2017

Member of the Assembly of Experts
- Incumbent
- Assumed office September 3, 2013
- Preceded by: Mir Akbar Ghaffar Gharabakh
- Constituency: West Azerbaijan
- Majority: 397,407 (5th)
- Majority: 1,208,599 (4th)

Personal details
- Born: 1959 (age 66–67) Mianeh, Iran
- Party: The Two Societies
- Education: Qom Hawza

Hujjat al-IslamAsghar Dirbaz (Persian: عسگر دیرباز, born 1959 in Mianeh, East Azerbaijan) is an Iranian Shiite cleric, author and politician. He is a member of 4th, 5th and 6th Assembly of Experts from the West Azerbaijan electorate. Dirbaz won his membership with 1,208,599 votes in the midterm election on 22 March 2013. He was reelected in the 2016 and 2024 elections.

== See also ==
- List of members in the Fourth Term of the Council of Experts
- List of members in the Fifth Term of the Council of Experts
