= People's Experts =

People's Experts خبرگان مردم
- Campaign logo
- Abbreviation: XM
- Leader: Akbar Hashemi Rafsanjani
- Ideology: Moderation
- Release date: 12 February 2016
- 5th Assembly of Experts: 55 / 88

People's Experts (Persian: خبرگان مردم, romanized: xebran mardum) is an electoral list published by former Iranian President Akbar Hashemi Rafsanjani to compete against the conservative Society of Seminary Teachers of Qom in the 2016 Iranian Assembly of Experts election.

The list shares 8 out of 16 candidates with the Combatant Clergy Association's list (including Rafsanjani and Ali Movahedi-Kermani) in the most important constituency, Tehran Province. However, Rafsanjani was removed from the Combatant Clergy Association's list, which has three of his harshest critics as its primary leaders: Mohammad Yazdi, Mohammad-Taqi Mesbah-Yazdi and Ahmad Jannati. According to analysts, the purpose of the list was to send a signal that Rafsanjani is still linked to the Combatant Clergy Association's "moderate faction," and his People's Experts list is a "disapproval voting" to the unfavourable Yazdi, Mesbah and Jannati.

== Overlapping lists ==
Friends of Moderation یاران اعتدال
- List leader: Hassan Rouhani
- Ideology: Moderation
- Release date: 15 February 2016
- Tehran Province Seats: 15 / 16

Three days after the list was published, another list led by Hassan Rouhani, called the "Friends of Moderation," (Persian: یاران اعتدال) was published for Tehran. It shared 15 candidates with People's Experts, with Nasrollah Shahabadi replacing Mohammad-Ali Amin. The list was limited to Tehran and did not endorse candidates nationwide. Another similar list made by Pervasive Coalition of Reformists, also known as "The List of Hope," endorsed candidates overlapping with the People's Experts list nationwide.
