= Abbas Ka'bi =

Iranian Ayatollah

Ayatollah Abbas Ka'bi
- آیت الله عباس کعبی
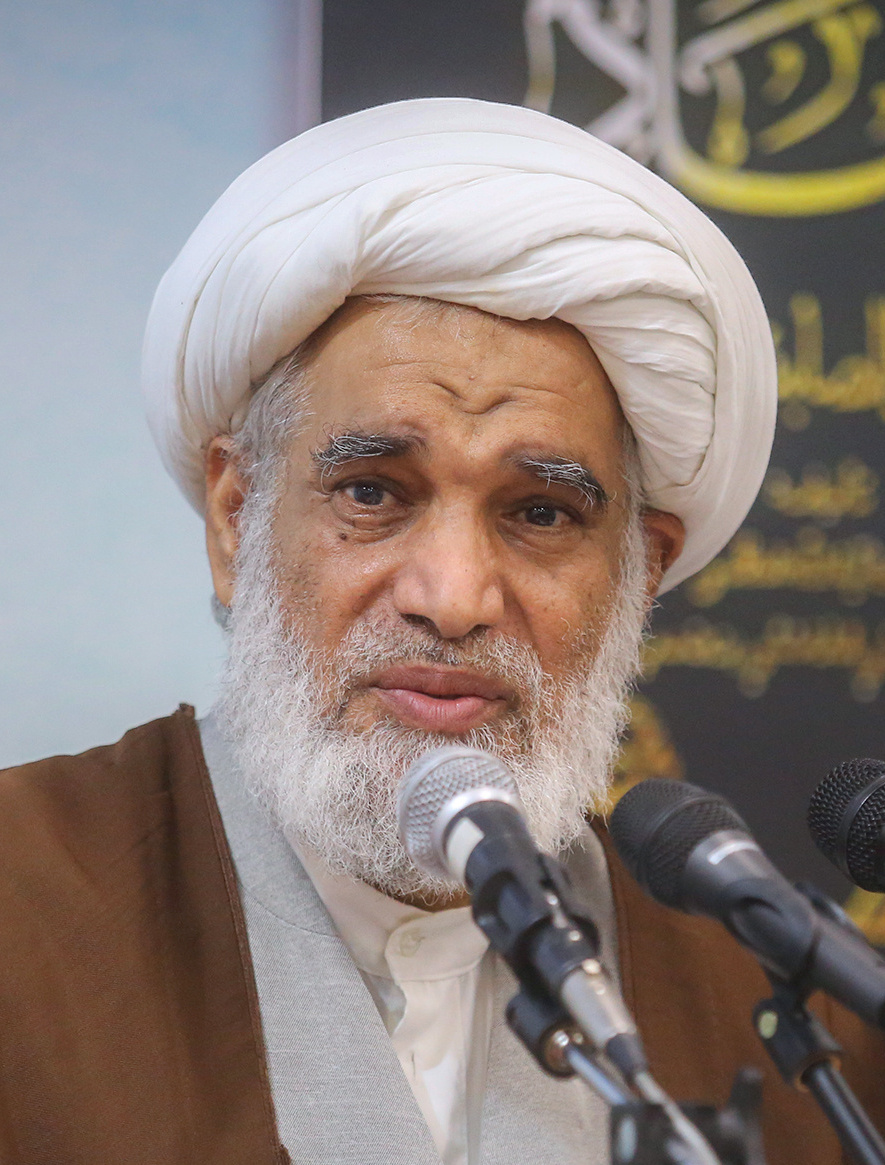
- Ka'bi in 2019

Personal life
- Born: 1962 (age 63–64) Ahwaz
- Education: Ahwaz seminary

Religious life
- Religion: Islam
- Denomination: Twelver Shi'ism

Ayatollah Abbas Ka'bi Nasab (Persian: عباس کعبی) is an Iranian Twelver Shi'a cleric who was born in Ahwaz in 1962 into a religious family. Records mention that he is one of the 12 members of the Guardian Council of the Islamic Republic of Iran, a member of the Society of Seminary Teachers of Qom, a professor of a university, a member and the vice-president of the security committee of the Assembly of Experts for Leadership, and other significant positions.

== Education ==
Ayatollah Ka’bi went to Ahwaz Seminary in 1976, then immigrated to Qom in 1985 and finished his Islamic education, and later, he participated in the classes of famous scholars and ayatollahs, such as Makeram Shirazi, Hossein Vahid Khorasani, Safi Golpaygani, Ja'far Sobhani, and so on.

Kaabi frequently gives speeches in Arabic.

== Positions ==
In 2018, Kaabi gave a speech in Arabic in which he said, "Moving the U.S. embassy in the Zionist entity from Tel Aviv to Jerusalem undoubtedly constitutes a new Balfour declaration."

In 2022, he said: "Israel is sending medical delegations to some Persian Gulf littoral states for a biological war against Islamic Ummah through gaining control over DNA of Muslim nations".

In 2022, he advocated for the death penalty for the protesters during Iranian_protests.

In a December 2022 Arabic speech, Kaabi decried the death of “martyr” Abu Mahdi Al-Muhandis while promising vengeance.

== Works ==
Abbas Ka'abi has written several books, such as:

- Al-Hasilah fi Hokm Al-Jahad Al-Ebtedaye fi Asre Al-Gheibat
- Feqh Al-Alaghat Al-Dovaliah fi Al-Islam
- Falsafeye Hoqooq
- Mardomsalary Dini
- Hoqooqe Asasi
- Hoqooqe Beinolmelale Islami
- Mosader Al-Hadis
- Azadi va Din, Azadi va Edalat
- Ahkam Al-Mayet
- Derase fi Elm Al-Hadis
- Zemanathaye Ejraee Ghanoone Asasi
- MardomSalarie Dini
- Ejraye Amalieh Hodud Wa Ejraye aan
