= Mohammad Mojtahed Shabestari =

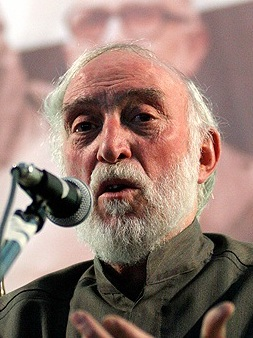

Member of the Parliament
- In office 28 May 1980 – 28 May 1984
- Constituency: Shabestar
- Majority: 20,167 (74.9%)

Personal details
- Born: 1936 (age 89–90) Shabestar, East Azerbaijan, Iran
- Relatives: Mohsen Mojtahed Shabestari (brother); Javad Mojtahed Shabestari (nephew)
- Theological work
- Religion: Islam
- Denomination: Twelver Shīʿā
- Main interests: Philosophy of religion, Hermeneutics
- Alma mater: Qom Seminary
- Taught at: University of Tehran

Mohammad Mojtahed Shabestari (Persian: محمد مجتهد شبستری; born 1936 in Shabestar, Iran) is an Iranian philosopher, theologian and hermeneutist. He was professor at the University of Tehran. He is noted for his idea that "religion-in-itself" is perfect, but not all-encompassing, i.e. it does not possess the answer to every question in life. Formerly a political activist and MP, he retired himself from politics in 1984.

He was also Imam of Islamic Centre Hamburg during the late Pahlavi era, between 1970 and 1978.

He has ceased wearing clerical attire, that according to Mehdi Khalaji, is in order to "disassociate himself with the pro-regime establishment".

== Education and career ==
As a student in Qom, Shabestari studied with Ruhollah Khomeini and Allameh Tabatabaei. He was influenced by Ruhollah Khomeini's idea that "Islamic ethics was not limited" to "personal relationships", but should be "reflected in the state and its form of government."

He stayed in the seminary for seventeen years, achieving both degrees of Ijtihad (religious adjudication) and Doctor of Philosophy.

In the spirit of the political Shia in 1960s and 1970s Iran, Shabestari also felt closely associated with the thinking of religious intellectuals such as Jalal Al-e Ahmad and Ali Shariati, as well as the politically motivated cleric Morteza Motahhari.

From 1970-1978, Shabestari served as director of the Shiite Islamic Center in the Imam Ali Mosque in Hamburg, Germany. He followed in this position Mohammad Beheshti (who was to become one of the main architects of the Islamic revolution of Iran) and was later succeeded in this position by future president of the Islamic Republic of Iran, Mohammad Khatami.

During the period he spent in Hamburg, Shabestari strongly supported the Christian-Islamic dialogue and extended the mosque’s scope of influence by opening it up to all Muslims. He also learned German and was able to pursue his interest, already evident in Qom, in Western philosophy and Christian, especially Protestant, theology. He studied the writings of theologians such as Paul Tillich, Karl Barth, and Karl Rahner, as well as the thinking of philosophers such as Immanuel Kant, Wilhelm Dilthey, and Hans-Georg Gadamer.

Upon his return to Iran, he served as a member of the first parliament (Majles of Iran) after the Iranian Revolution, but distanced himself from politics afterwards.

Shabestari was a full professor of Islamic philosophy at the University of Tehran from 1985-2006, where he also taught comparative religion and theology. He regularly organized international conferences on the theme of Christian-Muslim dialogue.

He was one of the editors of the Great Encyclopedia of Islam, published in Tehran, and chairs the department of Theology and Sects of the Center for the Great Islamic Encyclopedia. So far 16 volumes have been published of the encyclopedia, covering the first five letters of the alphabet.

== His philosophy and contributions ==
Although Shabestari has made a modest contribution to the introduction and application of modern hermeneutics to traditional Shiite theology and jurisprudence, and thus to the proposition of variability of religious knowledge, his most significant contribution seems to be his authoritative commentary on the essentially limited nature of religious knowledge and rules, and thus the necessity of complementing it with extra-religious sources.

Shabestari has argued that distinguishing the eternal (values), from the changeable (instances and applications) in religion needs a kind of knowledge that is not, itself, contained in the rules developed in Islamic jurisprudence (Fiqh). He has lamented the lack of such a body of knowledge in Islamic society: In the same vein, he has underscored the limited nature of religious knowledge in general, and religious jurisprudence, in particular.(10) In Shabestari's view, what is essential and eternal is the general values of Islam not particular forms of their realization in any particular historic time, (including the time of the prophet):

The meaning of perfection of religion (Ekmal e Din) is not that it contains everything under the sun, so that if we were unable to find a specific item in it, we could go off calling it imperfect. It is not perfection for religion to function as a substitute for science, technology, and human deliberation.

Also,

Religion does not wish to replace science and technology, and lay claim to the place of reason ... God has only offered answers for some of the needs of human beings. As for other needs, He has left it to reason and human effort to supply the answer.

Shabestari has suggested that there has been a divine providence for a separation of religious values and secular realities: In his book, Naghdi Bar Ghera'at e Rasmi az Din (A Critique of the Official Reading of Religion, December, 2000) Shabestari pursues his critique of religious absolutism as hermeneutically naive and realistically unworkable. Also, he has launched a major defense of modern concepts of individualism, democracy, and human rights, although they have not been articulated as such in Islamic sources.

In Shabestari’s view, human rights and democracy are products of human reason that have developed during the course of time and continue to evolve. As such, they are not already prescribed in the Qur'an and Sunna.

Indeed, the Qur'an remains mute with regard to our modern understanding of human rights, and yet these do not in any way contradict the divine truth contained in the Qur'an. Drawing on modern hermeneutics, Shabestari dismisses any claim that man could ever come into direct possession of God’s absolute truth.

Since the early 1990s, he was (as of 2003) been increasingly active in publishing articles in liberal daily papers and magazines in which he argues for a new, more critical approach to religion.

== Books ==
- Hermenutik, Kitab va Sunnat [Hermeneutics, the Book and Tradition], (Tehran: Tarh-e Naw, 1996).
- Iman va Azadi [Faith and Freedom], (Tehran: Tarh-e Naw, 1997). This also contains the essay titled "Christian Theology".
- Naqdi bar Qira’at-e Rasmi-e Din [A Critique of the Official Reading of Religion], (Tehran: Tarh-e Naw, 2000).
- Ta'amulati dar Qira’at-e Ensan-i az Din [Reflections on the Human Reading of Religion], (Tehran: Tarh-e Naw, 2004).

== Articles ==
- 'Fetrat-e Khoda joy-e Ensan dar Qur'an' in Andish-e Islami, 1, 7 (1358/1979).
- 'Fetrat-e Khoda joy-e Ensan dar Qur'an' in Andish-e Islami, 1, 9 (1358/1979).
- 'Qara'at-e rasmi az din' in Rah-e Naw, 19. Shahrivar 7, 1377/August 29, 1998.
- 'Qara'at-e Nabavi az Jahan' [A Prophetic Reading of the World].
- 'Die prophetische Lesart der Welt'.

== See also ==
- Abdolkarim Soroush
- Eastern philosophy
- Iranian philosophy
- Islamic philosophy
- Modern Islamic philosophy
- Intellectual movements in Iran

== Sources ==
- Dahlén, Ashk (2003), Islamic Law, Epistemology and Modernity. Legal Philosophy in Contemporary Iran, New York: Routledge, ISBN 9780415945295
