= 49-O =

Defunct clause in Indian election law

Rule 49-O was a rule in The Conduct of Elections Rules, 1961 of India, which governs elections in the country. It described the procedure to be followed when a valid voter decides not to cast his vote, and decides to record this fact. The rule was declared by the Supreme Court in September 2013 to be incompatible with the constitution and the Election Commission of India announced that the option under this rule would not be available anymore. The apparent purpose of this section was to maintain a proper record in order to prevent the election fraud or the misuse of votes.

== Text of Rule 49-O ==
49-O. Elector deciding not to vote.—If an elector, after his electoral roll number has been duly entered in the register of voters in Form 17A and has put his signature or thumb impression thereon as required under sub-rule (1) of rule 49L, decided not to record his vote, a remark to this effect shall be made against the said entry in Form 17A by the presiding officer and the signature or thumb impression of the elector shall be obtained against such remark.

== Implications of Rule 49-O ==
Since the ballot paper or electronic voting machine (EVM) showed only the list of candidates, a voter could not record his vote under Section 49-O directly, but had to inform the presiding officer at the election booth. This violated the secrecy of the ballot. However, with paper ballot one could "waste" one's vote by stamping on multiple candidates; this was the standard method of giving null votes without violating secrecy before the advent of the EVM.

== Proposals by the Election Commission of India ==
In 2004 the then Chief Election Commissioner of India, T.S. Krishnamurthy, submitted a number of proposed electoral reforms to the then Prime Minister, including the following:

NEGATIVE / NEUTRAL VOTING

The Commission has received proposals from a very large number of individuals and organizations that there should be a provision enabling a voter to reject all the candidates in the constituency if he does not find them suitable. In the voting using the conventional ballot paper and ballot boxes, an elector can drop the ballot paper without marking his vote against any of the candidates, if he chooses so. However, in the voting using the Electronic Voting Machines, such a facility is not available to the voter. Although, Rule 49 O of the Conduct of Election Rules, 1961 provides that an elector may refuse to vote after he has been identified and necessary entries made in the Register of Electors and the marked copy of the electoral roll, the secrecy of voting is not protected here in as much as the polling officials and the polling agents in the polling station get to know about the decision of such a voter.

The Commission recommends that the law should be amended to specifically provide for negative / neutral voting. For this purpose, Rules 22 and 49B of the Conduct of Election Rules, 1961 may be suitably amended adding a provision that in the ballot paper and the particulars on the ballot unit, in the column relating to names of candidates, after the entry relating to the last candidate, there shall be a column None of the above, to enable a voter to reject all the candidates, if he chooses so. Such a proposal was earlier made by the Commission in 2001 (vide letter dated 10.12.2001).

== Disqualification hoax ==
A hoax circulated which claims that if the '49-O' votes more than those of the winning candidate, then that poll will be canceled and will have to be re-polled. Furthermore, it claims that the candidates will be banned and they cannot contest the re-polling for their lifetime. This is an incorrect interpretation and was clarified by the Election Commission.

== Invalidation of rule 49-O ==
In its judgement of 27 September 2013, the Supreme Court directed that the Election Commission should make necessary provision in the ballot papers/EVMs for “None of the Above (NOTA)” option so that the electors who do not wish to vote for any of the candidates can exercise their right not to vote for any candidate without violation of the secrecy of their decision. Rules 41 (2), 41(3) and 49-O of the Conduct of Elections Rules, 1961, were held to be ultra vires Section 128 of the Representation of the People Act, 1951 and Article 19(1)(a) of the Constitution.. On 11 October 2013, the Election Commission released a notification declaring that the None of the above option would be provided on voting machines and the option under rule 49-O would not be available any longer.

== Criticism of proposals regarding negative voting and annulment of polling due to neutral votes ==
An argument in favour of provision of neutral voting is that it ensures the individual's freedom to choose whether or not to vote. Russia allows voters to vote "against all" candidates.

The proposals of negative voting by the election commission and annulment of polling if neutral votes exceed those of the winning candidate have been criticised by experts.

It is the duty of every citizen to educate himself / herself about the agenda of the candidates and to vote conscientiously for the candidate they think is better. The very purpose of an election is that the representatives should be chosen by the people. Encouraging people not to express their preferred candidate goes against the intended purpose. For this reason, voting is compulsory by law in Australia. Also, annulling an election would result in much waste of public funds spent to conduct polls.

It has been reported that activist Anna Hazare supports the 'Right Not To Vote'.

== See also ==
- Elections in India
- Compulsory voting
- Negative voting
