= Javad Mojtahed Shabestari =

Iranian Ayatollah

- جواد مجتهد شبستری

Member of the Assembly of Experts
- In office 24 May 2016 – 21 May 2024
- Constituency: West Azerbaijan
- Majority: 247,240

Personal details
- Born: 1966 (age 59–60)
- Party: Independent politician
- Parent: Mohsen Mojtahed Shabestari (father)
- Relatives: Mohammad Mojtahed Shabestari (uncle)
- Education: Qom Hawza

Javad Mojtahed Shabestari (Persian: جواد مجتهد شبستری) is an Iranian Shiite cleric and politician. He was a member of the 5th Assembly of Experts from the West Azerbaijan electorate. Mojtahed Shabestari won his membership with 247,240 votes. His father Mohsen Mojtahed Shabestari was member of the Assembly of Experts from the East Azerbaijan.
