= Reza Ostadi =

Iranian Ayatollah

Ayatollah Reza Ostadi
- رضا استادی
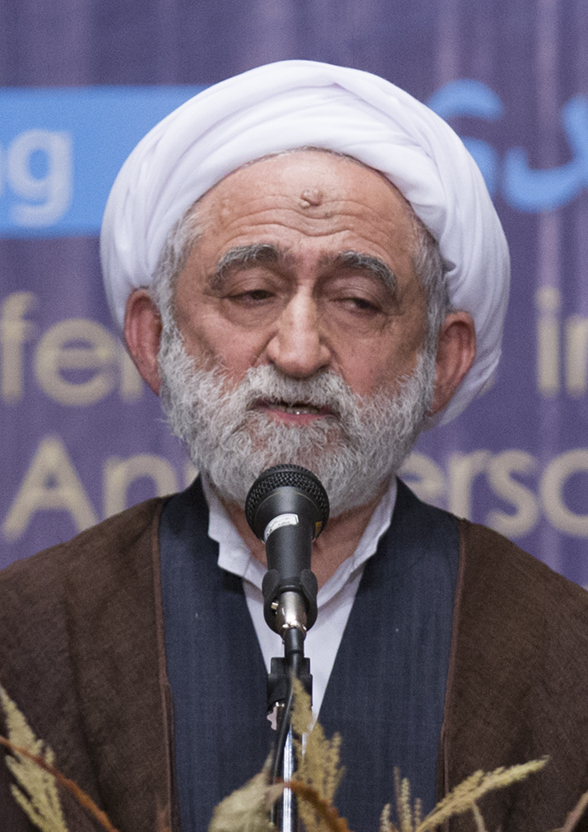

Member of the Assembly of Experts
- In office 15 December 2006 – 23 May 2016

Member of Guardian Council
- In office 3 August 1999 – 3 August 2005

Personal details
- Born: September 29, 1937 (age 88) Tehran, Iran
- Party: Society of Seminary Teachers of Qom

Reza Ostadi Moghaddam Tehrani (Persian: رضا استادی مقدم تهرانی) (born 1937 in Tehran) was a member of the Assembly of Experts of the Islamic Republic of Iran. Previously, he was also a member of the Guardian Council.

While in the Guardian Council in 2000, he confirmed the rejection of 600 candidates out of an original 758 candidates who were running for public office.

== Opposition ==
In July 2009, Ayatollah Ostadi issued a stinging criticism of Ahmadinejad and the 'status quo.' He announced he will stop leading Friday prayers at Qom Mosque. Ostadi belongs to the hardline Society of Seminary Teachers of Qom.

== See also ==
- List of ayatollahs
