= Amanollah Alimoradi =

Iranian Shia mujtahid (born 1963)

- Born: 1963 (age 62–63); Baft County, Kerman province, Pahlavi Iran

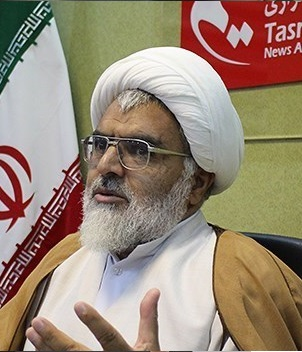
Amanollah Alimoradi in 2016

Amanollah Alimoradi (born 1963) is a Shia mujtahid, professor of seminary and university, president of the Rafsanjan Islamic Azad University, and a member of the Assembly of Experts from Kerman Province. In the results of the Assembly of Experts elections (2015), Amanollah Alimoradi entered the fifth term of the Assembly of Experts in the Kerman Province constituency with a conservative stance on the Jameetain list.

== Biography ==
Amanollah Alimoradi Bardsiri was born on 1 Farvardin in 1342 AH in the village of Barkanan, a part of Baft County, to a religious and knowledge-loving family. He began his primary education in his hometown and then completed his diploma in experimental sciences with the highest average in the county. His desire to study religious sciences led him to the Shahid Morteza Motahhar High School in Tehran in 1360. After completing his preparatory studies at the same school, he studied the levels of rational and traditional sciences. He was ordained by the Supreme Leader of the Revolution, Hazrat Seyyed Ali Khamenei, in 1363. He continued to take courses in ijtihad outside jurisprudence and principles, first with his professors in Tehran and then in Qom. In addition to seminary studies, he did not neglect university education and succeeded in obtaining a doctorate in jurisprudence and Islamic law.

== Teachers ==
Among his known teachers are as follows:

- Khamenei
- Emami Kashani
- Mahdavi Kani
- Khoshvak
- Haqshenas
- Khazali
- Bahjat
- Mirza Javad Agha Tabrizi
- Fazel Lankarani
- Makarem Shirazi
- Shabir Zanjani
- Sobhani
- Javadi Amoli
- Nouri Hamedani

== Records and responsibilities ==
- Lecturer at seminaries and universities in Kerman, Rafsanjan, Baft, Sirjan, Jiroft, Shahr Babak, Zarand
- Member of the university faculty
- Representative of the fifth term of the Assembly of Experts of the Supreme Leader.
