= Hashem Bathaie Golpayegani =

Iranian cleric (1941–2020)

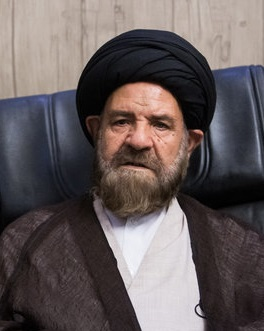
- Bathaie Golpayegani in 2018

Member of the Assembly of Experts
- In office 24 May 2016 – 16 March 2020
- Constituency: Tehran province
- Majority: 1,331,056 (29.57%)

Personal details
- Born: 1941 Guged, Isfahan province, Imperial State of Iran
- Died: 16 March 2020 (aged 78–79) Qom, Iran
- Cause of death: COVID-19
- Education: Qom Seminary
- Website: Official Website

Sayyid Hashem Bathaie Golpayegani (Persian: سید هاشم بطحایی گلپایگانی; 1941 – 16 March 2020) was an Iranian Shia Ayatollah and representative of the Tehran province in Iran's Assembly of Experts. He studied at the Qom Seminary.

Bathaie ran under the People's Experts and the Friends of Moderation electoral list in the 2016 Iranian Assembly of Experts election.

Golpayegani claimed that "America is the source of coronavirus, because America went head to head with China and realised it cannot keep up with it economically or militarily."

On 22 February, Hashem Bathaie Golpayegani announced at a ceremony that he had been infected with COVID-19, but had healed himself using an "Islamic remedy". Three weeks later, on 14 March, he was hospitalized. On 15 March 2020, the Al Arabiya English reported that he had been infected with coronavirus. On 16 March, Golpayegani died from the virus.

== Death ==
On March 15, 2020, the English-language news channel Al-Arabiya reported that Hachem Bathaie Golpayegani had been infected with SARS-CoV-2, the virus that causes coronavirus disease 2019. On March 16, he died from the infection.
