= 2016 Iranian Assembly of Experts election =

5th Iranian Assembly of Experts election

- 26 February 2016
- Turnout: 60.97%
Party	Leader	Vote %	Seats	+/–
CCA	Movahedi	75	66	−3
Seminary Teachers	Yazdi	72.7	64	−5
People's Experts	Rafsanjani	62.5	55	New
This lists parties that won seats. See the complete results below.
Chairman before	Chairman after
Mohammad Yazdi; Principlists	Ahmad Jannati; Principlists

The fifth Iranian Assembly of Experts election were held in Iran on 26 February 2016 to elect the members of the Assembly of Experts. All 88 members of the Assembly of Experts, who are known as mujtahids, are directly elected. The elections had been planned for 2014, but were delayed in order for the election to be held alongside the Islamic Consultative Assembly elections.

Incumbents were reelected in 49 of the assembly's 88 seats.

== Background ==
In the previous election, The Two Societies endorsed 81 candidates in a joint statement and were able to win 69 seats out of 86. The reformists did not reach a coalition and lost the election.

Along with the Parliamentary elections, it was the first election since the implementation of a landmark nuclear agreement between 5+1 and Iran that saw it curb sensitive nuclear activities in return for the lifting of sanctions against Iran. The deal was opposed by many hardliners but backed by moderates and reformists. Over 30 million Iranians voted in the elections, according to the BBC.

According to Deutsche Welle, several polling stations were left open until midnight, in order to enable millions of voters that came late to take part in the elections.

== Registration and qualification process ==
Candidates Registered and Qualified in the Assembly of Experts election history
Election date	N. C. Registered	+/−	N. C. Qualified	%
1982	168	Steady	146	86.90
1990	180	▲12	100	▼55.55
1998	396	▲216	160	▼40.40
2006	493	▲280	146	▼29.61
2016	801	▲305	166	▼20.72

For the first time in the history of the Islamic Republic of Iran, 801 aspirants registered to run in the elections. The number was a 62.47% increase compared to the previous election held in 2006. Among the candidates there were 16 women, another unprecedented event. There have been no female members in the assembly since its establishment.

On December 31, 2015, the Guardian Council announced that the four-hour Ijtihad test would be held January 5, 2016 in Qom in order to indicate candidates with proper knowledge, specifying that no alternative test date would be offered. The Council invited 527 candidates to take the test, excluding the 152 who reportedly withdrew and 111 who were denied permission (for a total of 790). Of the 16 women who registered, 10 received invitations.

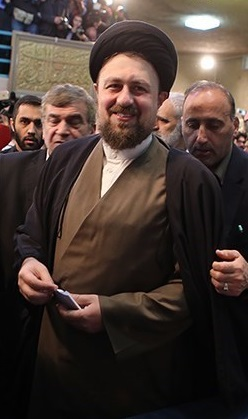
The Guardian Council disqualified Hassan Khomeini, grandson of founder of Iran's Islamic Republic a setback in the growing rivalry between reformists and conservatives.

Nearly 80% of candidates who applied for the Assembly were disqualified by the Guardian Council, including every woman and Hassan Khomeini.

Four incumbent members were disqualified:

- Ali Mohammad Dastgheib Shirazi, Fars province
- Mohammad Vaez Mousavi, East Azerbaijan province
- Mojtaba Taheri Khorramabadi, Luristan province
- Hassan Namazi, West Azerbaijan province

Other famous disqualified candidates include:

- Mehdi Ghoreishi
- Rasoul Montajabnia
- Kazem Seddiqi
- Morteza Agha-Tehrani
- Majid Ansari
- Mostafa Pourmohammadi

Disqualifications left nine constituencies with only one candidate per seat; in other terms 20% of seats would be won in an uncontested election (i.e. numbers of candidates is as same as numbers of seats). Later the Ministry of the Interior declared that with the Guardian Council's approval, some qualified candidates changed their electoral district to make the election competitive in the destination constituency.

=== Statistics ===
Seats and Candidates qualified before electoral district change
Constituency	N. Seats	N. C. Registered (Note: Exact number of total candidates is 801. Provincial details may be inaccurate.)	N. C. Qualified	P. Qualified	C/S
Tehran province	16	176	36	20.45%	2.25
Razavi Khorasan province	6	47	12	25.53%	2
Khuzestan province	6	24	7	29.16%	1.16
Isfahan province	5	61	16	26.22%	3.2
Fars province	5	29	8	27.58%	1.6
East Azerbaijan province	5	46	6	13.04%	1.2
Gilan province	4	30	6	20%	1.5
Mazandaran province	4	29	8	27.58%	2
West Azerbaijan province	3	34	3	8.82%	1
Kerman province	3	21	5	23.81%	1.66
Ardabil province	2	8	2	25%	1
Alborz province	2	24	6	25%	3
Sistan & Baluchestan Province	2	23	3	13.04%	1.5
Qazvin province	2	13	3	23.13%	1.5
Kurdistan province	2	23	4	17.39%	2
Kermanshah province	2	21	4	19.04%	2
Golestan province	2	16	4	25%	2
Markazi province	2	16	5	31.25%	2.5
Hamedan Province	2	13	3	23.07%	1.5
Luristan province	2	19	3	15.78%	1.5
Ilam province	1	14	2	14.28%	2
Bushehr province	1	5	1	20%	1
Chaharmahal and Bakhtiari province	1	16	2	12.5%	2
South Khorasan province	1	7	2	28.57%	2
North Khorasan province	1	10	1	10%	1
Zanjan province	1	18	3	16.66%	3
Semnan province	1	7	1	14.28%	1
Qom province	1	20	4	20%	4
Kohgiluyeh and Boyer-Ahmad province	1	9	2	22.22%	2
Hormozgan province	1	11	1	9.09%	1
Yazd province	1	11	3	27.27%	3
Total	88	801	166	20.72%	1.886

Number of candidates registered by academic degree out of 801
University degree	Candidates (%)
Ph.D.	103(12.85%)
Master's	95(11.86%)
Bachelor's	49(6.11%)
Associate	4(0.49%)
Diploma	88(10.98%)
No degree (Only seminary education)	462(57.67%)

Number of candidates registered by gender out of 801
Gender	Candidates (%)
Male	785(98%)
Female	16(2%)

Number of candidates invited to Ijtihad test out of 801
Status	Candidates (%)
Invited, Participated	387(48.31%)
Invited, Not Participated	150(18.72%)
Not Invited	264(32.95%)

Candidates by "Approbation Supervision" status of the Guardian Council out of 801
Status	Candidates (%)
"Qualified" (تائید)	166(20.72%)
"Disqualified" (رد)	207(25.84%)
"Unlawful" (غیرمجاز)	118(17.79%)
Withdrew (انصرافی)	158(19.72%)
Absent in test (غیبت آزمون)	150(18.72%)
Unknown	2(0.24%)

== Campaign ==
Telegram played an important role in the election.

In this election, contrary to the previous ones, The Two Societies did not reach a coalition and issued different lists. The main dispute between the two, was whether they should support Akbar Hashemi Rafsanjani candidacy or not. Combatant Clergy Association supported Rafsanjani; the Society of Seminary Teachers of Qom did not. There were three major electoral lists in the election:

- Combatant Clergy Association, led by Ali Movahedi-Kermani
- Society of Seminary Teachers of Qom, led by Mohammad Yazdi
- People's Experts, led by Akbar Hashemi Rafsanjani and endorsed by The List of Hope

A British radio is giving instructions to people of Tehran to 'vote for that given person, [and] do not vote for that given person!’... [People] should know what the enemy wants; when you know what the enemy wants, you act contrarily; this is obvious".

— Ali Khamenei, Remarks in meeting with people of East Azarbaijan Province

In a 17 February public speech, Supreme Leader of Iran Ali Khamenei warns of the subtle influence of foreign agents on the elections, stating that they are implementing new ploys in various ways to falsely polarize the election. He also condemned BBC Persian's programs on the elections and said that people will act differently from what they want.

Hardliners attacked Rafsanjani's list by calling it "The British list" (Persian: فهرست انگلیسی), implying that it is supported by the United Kingdom.

Ahmad Khatami, the interim Friday prayer imam of Tehran spoke out in the Friday prayer: "British and foreign media outlets are asking our people not to vote for Jannati, Yazdi, Mesbah, Alamolhoda and I. This is none of your business; you nosy people should know that these five are the top choices of our people".

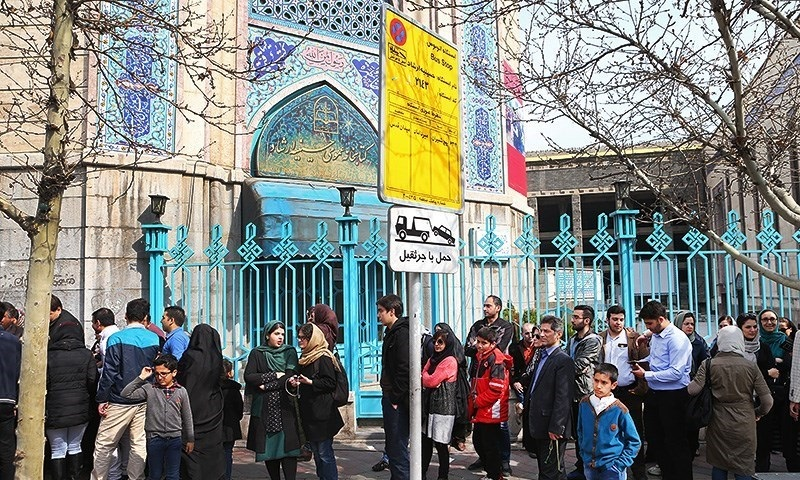
People waiting to cast their votes in Hosseiniyeh Ershad, Tehran

Akbar Hashemi Rafsanjani dismissed the charges and said "Such interpretations regarding British list (of candidates) is an insult to Iranian peoples's wisdom", in a meeting with the reformist and moderate candidates. He also deplored that 500 knowledgeable theologians and seminarians as well as university instructors were disqualified for the elections. "They [the hard-liners] presently have no excuse to rage against us and insult us. Thus, they [the hard-liners] attribute phrases like 'inside man' and 'British' to the old revolutionaries... These figures have been defeated by the people and are now seeking to exact [their] revenge on the administration and President Rouhani", he added.

Despite the restrictions, reformists became well-organised to seek gains. The reformists who were barred from public presence as a result of 2009 protests, tried to keep the flame alive online. The instant messaging service Telegram played an important role in the campaigning period. More than 20 million Iranians are reported to be on the messaging app. Mohammad Khatami, who is facing restrictions on activities and Iranian media (including State Television and Radio) are banned from mentioning his name or publishing the images him, released a video message online urging people to vote for “The List of Hope”, creating a huge momentum —The coalition of reformists and moderates, endorsed Rafsanjani's “People's Experts”. Khatami's message was viewed more than 3 million times on Telegram in one day. Another poster shared on the app was viewed by a million people in 12 hours.

Dear people of Iran, the country needs your vote, Let's decide on a hopeful future for Iran on Friday.

— Hassan Rouhani, Text message sent to almost every cell phone in Iran

Two days before the election, President Hassan Rouhani took to text message almost every cell phone to drum up support in Friday's elections, tacitly endorsing the moderate list of hope.

== Results ==
=== Summary ===
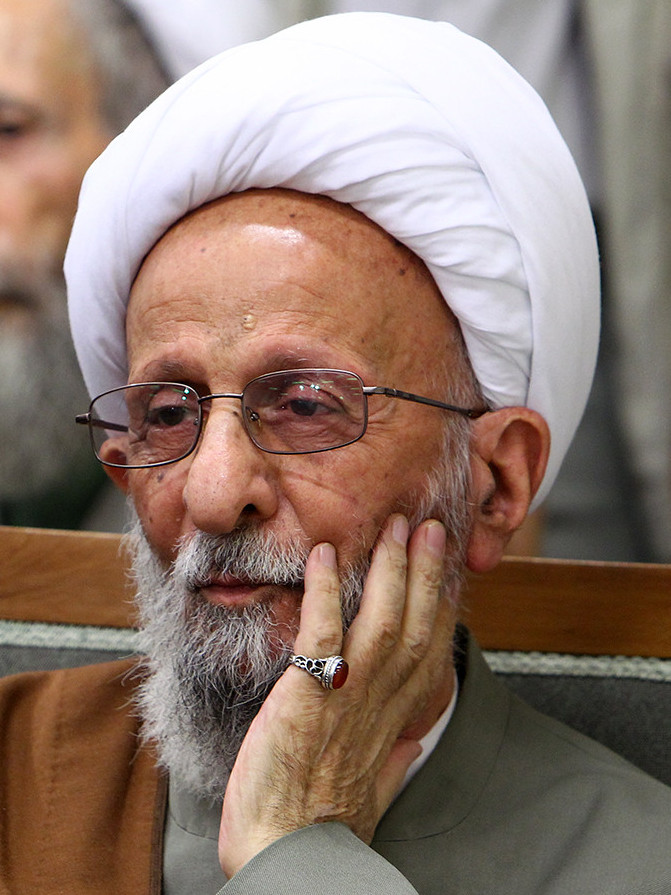
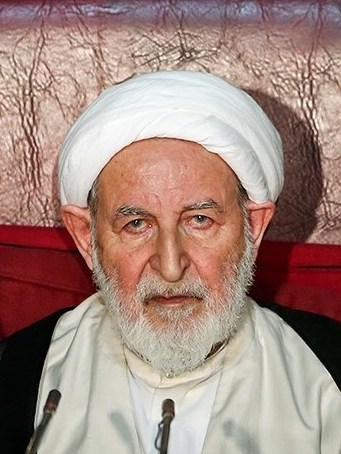
Mohammad-Taqi Mesbah-Yazdi (left) and Mohammad Yazdi (right) lost their seats.

According to the Associated Press, moderate clerics defeated hardliners and dominated the assembly with Akbar Hashemi Rafsanjani and Hassan Rouhani, alongside 50 of their allies, securing 59% of the seats. The moderates previously held around 20 seats in the assembly.

In Tehran province, Rafsanjani's People's Experts list received a landslide victory, winning 15 of 16 seats, and were successful in establishing its "tactical/disapproval voting strategy", causing Mohammad-Taqi Mesbah-Yazdi and Mohammad Yazdi to lose their seats. Considering the latter was Chairman of the Assembly of Experts, the voters also changed the officeholder. However, Ahmad Jannati placed 16th and got reelected.

Compared to the previous term, 38% of the assembly has changed. Among the outgoing members, nine were deceased (among them Ali Meshkini and Mohammad Reza Mahdavi Kani), 13 did not compete in the election (four incumbents were disqualified, like Ali Mohammad Dastgheib Shirazi and 9 did not seek reelection, most notably Abbas Vaez Tabasi) and 10 were not elected.

According to a report published by the Iranian Students' News Agency, 27 seats went to Principlists while Reformists won 20 seats. 35 candidates were endorsed by both. Independent clerics who were not listed managed to win 6 seats.

Support (Seats)	Percentage
Reformist/Principlist support (35)	39.77%
Principlists support only (27)	30.68%
Reformists support only (20)	22.72%
Independents (6)	6.81%
Distribution of seats by political camp support

A statistical work on electoral lists by Khabaronline shows that The Two Societies have gained plurality. 27 seats were endorsed by all People's Experts, List of Hope, Combatant Clergy Association and Society of Seminary Teachers of Qom lists. Combatant Clergy Association and Society of Seminary Teachers of Qom won five and three exclusive seats respectively, while their joint lists won 24 seats. People's Experts won 19 exclusive seats.

Lists winning exclusive seats (Source: Khabaronline)
List	Seats Won		
List	Exclusive	Shared	Total
People's Experts/Hope	19	27	46 / 88 (52%)
Combatant Clergy Association	5	51	56 / 88 (64%)
Society of Seminary Teachers of Qom	3	51	54 / 88 (61%)

Another piece published by Khabaronline, indicates that Combatant Clergy Association leads the race winning 66 seats and Society of Seminary Teachers of Qom and People's Experts have won 64 and 55 seats respectively. People's Experts has 16 exclusive winning candidates, the number is 3 for Society of Seminary Teachers of Qom while Combatant Clergy Association has no exclusive seat. The Two Societies have 25 shared seats and 35 candidates are endorsed by all three lists. At last, only four members of the assembly would be independent.

List (Seats won)	Percentage
Combatant Clergy Association (66)	75%
Society of Seminary Teachers (64)	72.72%
People's Experts (55)	62.50%
Independents (4)	4.50%
Distribution of seats by electoral list

List (Seats won)	Percentage
CCA/SST/PE joint support (35)	39.77%
CCA/SST joint support (25)	28.4%
PE exclusive support (19)	18.18%
CCA/PE joint support (5)	5.68%
No list support (4)	4.50%
SST exclusive support (3)	3.4%
CCA exclusive support (0)	0%
Distribution of seats by electoral list support status

=== Turnout ===
Turnout was officially declared 62%. The official results were disputed by BBC Persian columnist.

Source: Ministry of Interior
Constituency	Registered Voters	Turnout
East Azerbaijan province	2,909,208	62%
West Azerbaijan province	2,296,591	65.5%
Ardabil province	998,499	61.5%
Isfahan province	3,445,298	61%
Alborz province	1,480,131	54%
Ilam province	434,636	75%
Bushehr province	691,406	76%
Tehran province	8,475,077	50%
Chaharmahal and Bakhtiari province	702,623	75%
South Khorasan province	598,205	72%
North Khorasan province	624,300	71%
Razavi Khorasan province	4,420,718	68%
Khuzestan province	3,477,959	70%
Zanjan province	775,820	67%
Semnan province	494,712	60%
Sistan and Baluchestan province	1,685,760	66.14%
Fars province	3,374,243	63.6%
Qazvin province	887,164	61%
Qom province	768,730	60%
Kurdistan province	1,161,537	53.3%
Kerman province	2,083,878	63%
Kermanshah province	1,507,595	60%
Kohgiluyeh and Boyer-Ahmad province	518,811	80%
Golestan province	1,288,536	81%
Gilan province	1,861,370	65%
Luristan province	1,409,036	
Mazandaran province	2,235,636	61%
Markazi province	1,047,670	60.4%
Hormozgan province	1,119,093	67%
Hamedan province	1,505,279	58.1%
Yazd province	665,504	64.5%
Total	54,915,024	62%

== Reactions/Analysis ==
- Supreme Leader of Iran Ali Khamenei said that "the people really shone brightly in the elections and participation of 62% of the qualified people in the election is a high percentage compared to many countries even the U.S". The Leader said the next Assembly of Experts is duty bound to "remain revolutionary, think revolutionary and act revolutionary". He also praised the "decent behavior" of the candidates who failed to win the votes and noted a failure by Mohammad-Taqi Mesbah-Yazdi and Mohammad Yazdi to win seats in the Assembly of Experts was a "damage" to the Assembly.
- Farzan Sabet of the Carnegie Endowment saw "four important trends":
  - the continuing unity of the moderate alliance,
  - disunity in the conservative alliance between the hardliners and the traditionalists,
  - voter engagement with the electoral process, and
  - the use of alternative media to overcome the state's media monopoly during campaigns.
- There were anomalies in the reported results from the Interior Ministry of Iran, an example being some candidates receiving more than 120% of the votes cast in their district, and 22 million ballots cast in four provinces with a total population of 15 million.

== Aftermath ==
=== Electing new chairman ===
On 24 May 2016, the Assembly held its new session to elect the chairman. Akbar Hashemi Rafsanjani did not put his name and allegedly asked Ebrahim Amini to step forward for the office. The results of the voting were as follows:

Candidate	Votes
Ahmad Jannati	51 / 88 (58%)
Ebrahim Amini	21 / 88 (24%)
Mahmoud Hashemi Shahroudi	13 / 88 (15%)
Blank or Invalid votes	1 / 88
Absent voters	2 / 88

The appointment of Ahmad Jannati signaled that despite recent gains by moderates, hard-liners remain the dominant force within the assembly.

== See also ==
- 2016 Iranian legislative election
- List of members in the Fifth Term of the Council of Experts
