= Disapproval voting =

Electoral system that allows voters to express disapproval

Disapproval voting is any electoral system that allows many voters to express formal disapproval simultaneously, in a system where they all share some power. Unlike most electoral systems, it requires that only negative measures or choices be presented to the voter or representative. If used to select candidates for an office, or for continuation to a next round of voting or play, it is either single- or multi-winner, as everyone who is not disapproved of is in effect a winner, for that round.

A referendum or a recall election may be said to be minimal forms of disapproval voting. However, usually only one measure or candidate is presented to be disapproved of. True disapproval voting would require more than two choices or representatives, and would ask voters to disavow one or more.

== Voting against ==
There are a variety of interpretations of the meaning of a negative vote. The term is sometimes used for allowing a voter to reject the entire field of candidates; it can also mean that the only option offered voters is to vote against one or more candidates, but it is sometimes used for systems that allow a voter to choose whether to vote for or against a candidate.

The psychology of vetoing, protesting, excluding individuals or options, or removing an incumbent, triggers a very different cognitive bias and mode of risk aversion on the part of voters, legislators, or board members - thus it is an over-simplification to think of disapproval as simply 'negative approval'. Similar asymmetries apply in economics, where they are studied in behavioral finance, and in social sciences and ethics, as the expression of tolerances versus preferences, e.g. as in opinion polls.

The well-known lifeboat game is often portrayed in fiction as having a disapproval voting form, with the individual who is most disapproved of being tossed overboard.

General-purpose methods of disapproval voting, e.g. for use in general elections as an electoral reform, have been proposed and discussed by political scientists, but there is little literature on the subject. Most discussion of the issue is concentrated in the theory of consensus decision making, where small numbers of members disapproving of a measure have disproportionate power to block it.

Also, there has been an explosion of application of disapproval voting electoral systems in the reality game show, as noted below. Most people are familiar with the concept only from these shows.

== Disapproval expression in other electoral systems ==
Six regions of Russia and several other countries of the region allow voters to vote "against all" candidates. In Canada, one can appear at a polling station and refused ballot; although this does not count as a vote, refused ballots are tallied separately from spoiled ballots and no-shows.

Any electoral system permits some expression of disapproval, but these are necessarily confused with expressions of choice or approval, leading some to conclude that separating these expressions is best:

After the U.S. presidential election, 2000, some commentators suggested that the ability to approve of a candidate, but disapprove of his or her party affiliation or elements of his or her platform, might be quite important, and that satisfaction of citizens with the political system might well depend on such an electoral reform.

A group of members of the United States Green Party, calling itself "Greens for Gore", made explicit the fact that they were voting for Gore but supported not the platform of the Democratic Party which nominated him, but that of their own Green Party, which they called on Gore to implement. This is an example of disapproval voting on an informal level, where voters found a way to approve of the candidate, while disapproving of party and platform – and of his key opponent, George W. Bush.

The Soviet Union experimented with a form of disapproval voting for multi-winner elections during the Perestroika, in which voters could cross off the names of candidates they did not approve of, and those with the greatest approval (above a 50% threshold) were elected. Before that, the voting was but a sham: formally a disapproval system with only one name on the ballot, the voters weren't even supposed to enter the booth for striking it out to spoil or write in another candidate but immediately drop the collected ballot into the box (hence, no secret suffrage).

It is also often said that votes for a "protest candidate" or a "compromise candidate" can be viewed as disapproval votes, since the undesirable characteristics of the incumbent or alternative, respectively, can be said to be the voters' main concern. This of course is impossible to determine from the electoral results, as a vote intended to choose that candidate is indistinguishable in most systems from one that was intended to block or disapprove of another.

== Arguments for and against ==
Given the prevalence of disapproval as a tool of government, including the criminal law and diplomatic relations, some see voting less as a positive and voluntary choice of a desirable outcome than as a way to reduce losses.

Other advocates of disapproval voting argue that they simply wish to extend to the citizen the powers that are already ceded to the executive, in terms of structure, e.g. many voters formally disapproving should tell the president when to exercise the veto. This is one of many arguments made for deliberative democracy, and advocated by some in the US, e.g. Ralph Nader.

Detractors of this view of civic life note that the complexity of widespread public consultation and letting the public vote down necessary but unpopular expenditures is contrary to the spirit of a representative democracy, and is an impractical and untrusting measure. In part this is a reaction to the negative view of politics, parties, and platforms inherent in any scheme of disapproval.

Advocating disapproval or approval voting may be seen as taking a position on the tolerances versus preferences problem. Some propose that disapproval is more likely to trigger tolerance ideas of the voter, e.g. as in a poor woman choosing a lifetime mate, while approval is more likely to trigger preferences, e.g. as in shopping. This suggestion, like most advocacy of electoral systems, is controversial as it implies that voters cannot measure both tolerances and preferences for themselves, and come to conclusions that consider both.

Another issue is that expressions of disapproval in many societies, especially in Asia, are taken as anti-social. In the government of China, which is structured more as a bureaucracy than as a democracy, an official who rises a level is ratified by others at the level he is entering – no other candidates are presented but abstention as a protest is not uncommon. Support in this ratification vote of less than 67–80% is taken as a strong disapproval – and most likely ends the rise of that individual at his current level. In any such structure, formal disapproval voting may lead to less honest outcomes, if the peer pressure not to be seen to formally disapprove of anyone is extreme.

== Popular use ==
The best-known examples of the use of disapproval voting are on reality game shows, e.g. Survivor, The Weakest Link, where it is used to eliminate one contestant at a time from the contest, or the variation used on Boot Camp where the eliminated contestant can "take one (other) out with him". (Note: the examples given here are better examples of Coombs' method than disapproval voting as described here.)

Another example of disapproval voting is in the American animated web series Battle for Dream Island, where the viewers vote who they want eliminated by typing their name (which got replaced by typing their letter in square brackets in the fourth season, Battle for B.F.D.I) in the comment section. It was later replaced with approval voting in the second part of the fourth season, Battle for B.F.B., except the least voted contestant is eliminated.

Since the Battle for Dream Island: The Power of Two episode "Oneirophobe's Nightmare", viewers now vote via a Google Form. This was most likely implemented to prevent people from counting each vote in the comments to predict the final results and therefore causing "vote wars".

== No-confidence voting ==
A particular case of disapproval voting is the motion of no confidence. This is a motion of a legislature – rather than a vote of the electorate that elected it – expressing that it disapproves of the current executive, or of certain members of the executive. In the Westminster system, the person or persons who lose a motion of no confidence are normally expected to resign as a matter of constitutional convention, and in the case of an executive a general election normally results, unless a replacement government (typically a new prime minister, who can subsequently appoint a new cabinet) can be approved in a motion of confidence. This process is formalized in the United Kingdom by the Fixed-term Parliaments Act 2011.

No-confidence voting can only disapprove; it cannot be used to approve of any particular candidates. This decision is left to political discussions among those involved.

The percentage which triggers a successful no-confidence vote can vary widely, from small values (like 20%) which allow minorities (particularly people with experience in the issue being voted) to decide the outcome, up to unanimity.

== See also ==
- Anti-plurality voting
- Approval Voting
- None of the above
- Ostracism
- Rule 49-O of the Election Commission of India
