= Mohsen Qomi =

Iranian cleric

- محسن قمی
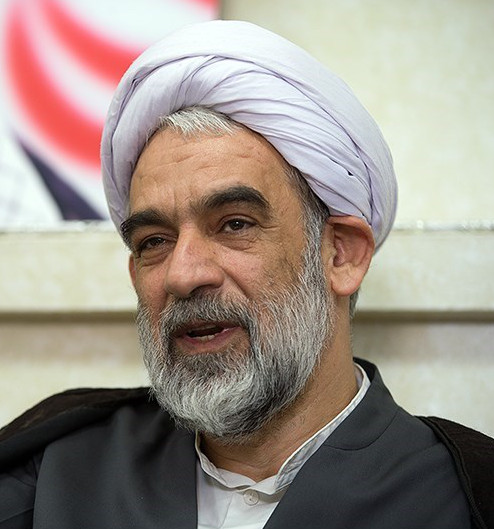

Member of the Assembly of Experts
- Incumbent
- Assumed office 23 February 1999
- Constituency: Tehran province
- Majority: 2,229,759

Personal details
- Born: Mohsen Qomi; 1960 (age 65–66) Pakdasht, Iran
- Party: Islamic Coalition Party; Combatant Clergy Association
- Website: Official website

Mohsen Qomi (Persian: محسن قمی) is an Iranian cleric, principlist politician and a member of the Assembly of Experts.

== Career ==
Qomi is a cleric and has the title of Hojjat ol-Eslam. He is a member of the board of trustees of the Islamic Coalition Society. In 2016, he joined Combatant Clergy Association.

He has been a member of the Assembly of Experts, representing Tehran. He was also elected to the fourth assembly in 2011, again representing Tehran.

Until his resignation in January 2006 Qomi was the director of the Supreme Leader Khamanei's representative office in the Iranian universities. The same date he was named a member to the high council of cultural revolution and also the council of the representative office in the Iranian universities. He has also been serving as the deputy head of the Supreme Leader's office on international affairs and communications.

In late July 2013, the Mehr news agency reported that he was the only candidate for the intelligence minister at the cabinet of newly-elect president Hassan Rouhani. However, not Qomi but Mahmoud Alavi was nominated for the post on 4 August.
