= 2006 Iranian Assembly of Experts election =

4th Iranian Assembly of Experts election

- 15 December 2006

All 88 seats to the Assembly of Experts
| Alliance | Principlists | Reformists |
| Seats won | 59 | 29 |
- Composition of the Assembly following the election
Speaker before election
Ali Meshkini
Principlists
Elected Speaker
Ali Meshkini
Principlists

The fourth Iranian Assembly of Experts election was held on 15 December 2006. The Assembly of Experts is a Council of 86 mujtahids that elect the Supreme Leader, and oversee his actions. The members of the Assembly are elected every eight years directly by the people of Iran.

The elections took place the same day as the City and Village Councils elections.

== Candidates ==
The credentials of being a Mujtahid were approved for all candidates by the Guardian Council using written and oral (interview) examinations. Some members of the Guardian Council also ran for the Assembly of Experts. Although there were a few female ayatollahs (Mujtahidehs) applying for candidacy, they could not pass the examination. The number of candidates which passed the examination was so low that the council had to lower the passing mark several times. There were initially 144 candidates for the 86 available seats. This was later increased, and according to Islamic Republic News Agency there were 181 qualified candidates. However, the number of candidates on the day of election was 165, and for the first time there were two non-cleric doctor of Islam candidate, although they were not elected.

== Results ==
The Ministry of Interior reported an estimated 60% turnout of the 46.5 million eligible voters, reporting "more than 28 million people" as the number of voters who had voted. Different parties had several candidates in common, but Baztab News reported that the candidate list announced by the Combatant Clergy Association captured most of the seats (68 of 86 seats, while introducing 81 candidates). Reformists backed by Mahdi Karroubi and conservative associates of Mesbah Yazdi failed to live up to their expectations.

Of particular note was the victory of the pragmatist list led by Ayatollah Rafsanjani, over hard-line candidates associated with President Mahmoud Ahmadinejad. Rafsanjani had lost out to Ahmadinejad in the runoff of the 2005 election for president. Yet Rafsanjani won nearly twice as many votes as President Ahmadinejad's mentor, hard-liner Ayatollah Mohammad Taqi Mesbah Yazdi. Final results for the Assembly of Experts showed that more than 65 candidates close to Rafsanjani were elected. At 60 percent, voter turnout was much higher than in previous years.

The Assembly convened on 19 February 2007 and Ali Meshkini was re-elected as chairman. The changes in the presiding board from the 3rd assembly were the replacement of Mohammad Yazdi with Ebrahim Amini, who retired, as the 2nd deputy chairman; and election of Hassan Rohani as a provisionist.

After the disputed results of the June 2009 Iranian presidential election were certified by Supreme Leader Ali Khamenei, Chairman Rafsanjani was reported to have called a meeting of the Assembly of Experts, as the Assembly has the constitutional power to hire and fire the Supreme Leader. On 8 March 2011, Ayatollah Mohammad-Reza Mahdavi Kani replaced Ayatollah Rafsanjani as chairman. Mohammad-Reza Mahdavi Kani died in October 2014. On 10 March 2015 the Assembly voted in Ayatollah Mohammad Yazdi to be the next Chairman.

The term begun in 2007 shall allegedly last ten years (rather than the regular eight) due to the "election aggregation" plan of the government, put in place to allow the government to run elections simultaneously for the Assembly of Experts and the Parliament, thereby economizing election administration costs.

== See also ==
- Assembly of Experts
- List of members in the Fourth Term of the Council of Experts
