= Mohammad-Ali Taskhiri =

Iranian Ayatollah (1944-2020)

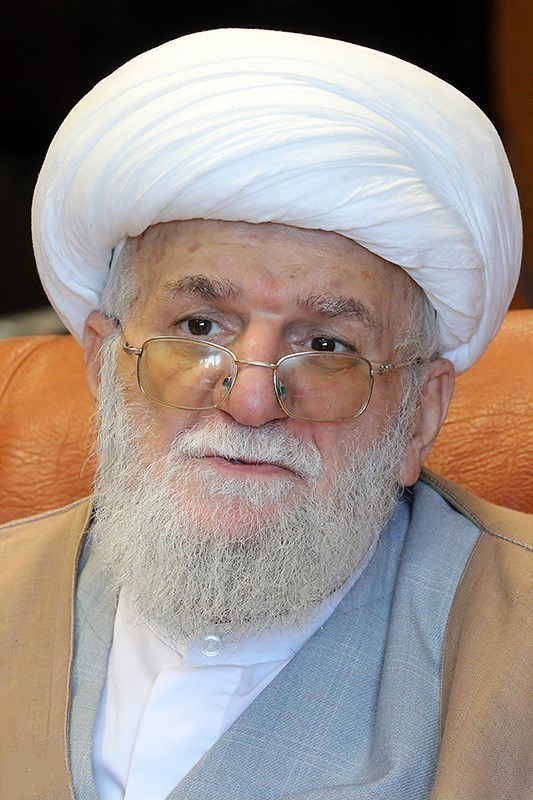

Member of the Assembly of Experts
- In office 24 May 2016 – 18 August 2020
- Constituency: Tehran Province
- Majority: 1,442,224
- In office 23 February 1999 – 19 February 2007
- Constituency: Gilan Province

Personal details
- Born: Mohammad-Ali Taskhiri; 19 October 1944 Najaf, Iraq
- Died: 18 August 2020 (aged 75) Tehran, Iran
- Occupation: Cleric; Politician; Diplomat

Mohammad-Ali Taskhiri (19 October 1944 – 18 August 2020) was an Iranian cleric and diplomat. During the 1980s, Taskhiri served as the Iranian representative to the Organisation of the Islamic Conference and was involved in promoting Iranian interests during the height of the Iran–Iraq War.

His role, while always significant in the government of Iran, became even more so after the invasion of Iraq in 2003. Taskhiri was born in Iraq and was an important liaison with Shia Iraqi organizations. He was a signatory to a letter from 38 Muslim scholars, sent as the official Islamic response to comments made by Pope Benedict XVI on September 12, 2006. He was one of the Ulama signatories of the Amman Message, which gives a broad foundation for defining Muslim orthodoxy.

After the late Ayatollah Vaezzadeh Khorasani, Ayatollah Taskhiri was the Secretary General of the World Assembly for the Proximity of Islamic Schools of Thought for many years, and due to his scientific ability and familiarity with Arabic and English languages, he took effective measures to unite the Islamic world.

He was also for a while the vice-president of the International Union of Muslim Scholars, who resigned after Qaradawi's bizarre stances. Ayatollah Taskhiri chaired the Supreme Council of the Assembly for the Proximity of Islamic Schools of Thought and represented the Leadership Assembly of Experts.

== Biography of the herald of the Islamic Unity ==
Ayatollah Mohammad Ali Taskhiri, the son of the late Hojjat al-Islam wal-muslemin Hajj Sheikh Ali Akbar, was born in 1944 in Najaf Ashraf and his father was from Tonekabon, one of the western cities of Mazandaran province in Iran. He completed his primary and secondary education in Najaf and taught seminary courses up to the stage of Kharidj fiqh in the presence of great masters such as the great Ayatullah Martyr Seyyed Mohammad Baqir Sadr, Khoi, Seyyed Mohammad Taghi Hakim, Sheikh Javad Tabrizi, Sheikh Kazem Tabrizi, Sadr Badkoubi and Sheikh Mojtaba Lankarani also studied at the Faculty of Jurisprudence in Najaf, majoring in Arabic literature, jurisprudence and principles. Ayatollah Taskhiri also taught common subjects while studying in the seminary of Najaf Ashraf; In the field of Arabic poetry and literature, he also benefited from the presence of great masters such as Ayatollah Sheikh Mohammad Reza Muzaffar, Sheikh Abdul Mahdi Matar and Sheikh Mohammad Amin Zainuddin. At the beginning of his youth, with great enthusiasm for Arabic poetry and literature, he composed Arabic poems and literary lectures on various occasions and in various circles of poetry and literature; He took an active part in the political struggle against the Ba'athist regime in Iraq, and in this connection he was imprisoned and sentenced to death, but he was saved with the help of God Almighty.

In 1971, he went to the seminary of Qom and participated in the courses of great professors such as Ayatollah Golpayegani, Ayatollah Vahid Khorasani and Ayatollah Mirza Hashem Amoli for nearly 10 years; During this period, he also taught seminary sciences and Arabic literature in some scientific and academic centers across the country, and with the victory of the glorious Islamic Revolution of Iran, he spent all his time on cultural affairs and Islamic propaganda inside and outside the country.

== Activities and positions ==
Ayatollah Taskhiri has held the following positions in cultural, Islamic learning and executive positions:

- Member of the Assembly of Leadership Experts of Gilan Province since 1998
- Advisor to the Supreme Leader on Cultural Affairs of the Islamic World
- International Deputy of the Office of the Supreme Leader since 1990
- High Adviser on International Affairs Ba'thah of the Supreme Leader in Hajj Affairs and its Deputy International
- Head of the Islamic Culture and Relations Organization from the establishment in 1994 to 2000
- Adviser to the Minister of Culture and Islamic Guidance on International Affairs
- International Deputy of the Islamic Propaganda Organization from 1981 to 1991
- Member of the Board of Trustees of the Islamic Propaganda Organization
- Responsible for the committee for supervising the educational programs of foreign students inside and outside the country
- Secretary General of the World Assembly of Ahl al-Bayt for nine years and a member of its Supreme Council
- Member of the Supreme Council of the World Assembly for the Proximity of Islamic Schools of Thought
- Secretary General of the World Assembly for the Proximity of Islamic Schools of Thought
- Member of the jurisprudential committee of the Ahl al-Bayt Assembly located in the seminary of Qom
- Chairman of the Cultural Committee of the 8th Conference of the World Muslim Leaders in Tehran
- Chairman of the Coordinating Committee for Joint Islamic Activities in the Organization of the Islamic Conference
- Member of the Board of Trustees of the Organization of Religious Schools Abroad
- Member of the Board of Trustees of the Organization for the Defense of the Children's Rights (Kafel)
- Member of the High Committee for Cultural Affairs of Amirkabir Institute from 1981 to 1996
- Member of the Board of Trustees of Tehran School of Principles of Religion
- Chairman of the Board of Trustees of the University of the Islamic Schools of Thought.
- Member of Jeddah Islamic Jurisprudence Association since its establishment in 1983 and representative of Iranian seminaries.
- Professor of Imam Sadegh University in the field of contemporary jurisprudence
- Professor at Tarbiat Modarres University in the field of Islamic economics
- Supervisor of Al-Tawhid Magazines, Risale-i-Thaqalin and Risale-ul-Taqrib in Arabic, which are currently being published
- Member of the jurisprudential committee of the World Bank of Islamic Development.
- Member of the Board of Trustees of the ECO Cultural Organization
- Member of Damascus Arabic Language Association
- Member of the Sharia Assembly of the Audit Committee of Financial Institutions in Bahrain
- Member of Al-Bayt Institute of Islamic Thought.
- Vice President of the International Union of Muslim Scholars

== Works ==
- In the Companion of some Islamic Conferences of the Ministers of the Islamic Countries
- Enlightening in the Course of the Islamic unity
- Unity
- A Glance at the Life Activities of the Imams of the Ahlu-al-Bayte
- Some Intimate Writings on Leaves
- Convergence between Christianity and Islam
- The System of Servitude in Islam
- Economics
- Fasting and the Relevant Common Traditions
- About the Last Savior (His Excellency the Hojjat-ibn-al-Hassan-al- Askari)
- Islamic Government
- On the Satanic Verses
- About the Constitution of the Islamic Republic of Iran (The Structures of the Islamic System)
- Islamic Uprising
- In the Companion of People and Some Memories
- The Islamic Thought Conferences in Algeria
- The Rules of the Principles of Jurisprudence according to the Ja'afari's School of Shi'is
- Rules of Jurisprudence
- General Phenomena in Islam
- On Shi'ah and Religious Authority
- Together with the Meetings of the Assembly of Islamic Jurisprudence -in the city of Jaddah (S.Arabia)
- The International Conference of Population and Development
- An Exegesis of the Magnificent Qur'an (1)
- The Islamic Penal System
- The Islamic View on the Imposed Peace
- Hajj (Pilgrimage), the Aims and Functions
- The Spring and the Fish (A Story for Children)
- Zaqat (The Islamic System of Taxation)
- Islam, the Religion of True Dignity
- Friday Congressional Prayers and the Relevant Common Traditions
- Muslims! March towards Unity
- Towards God, the Almighty
- The Superstition of the Eternity of Matter
- Palestine's Melody of Resistance
- The Messenger from among the Common People
- Man and the Divine Decree
- The Transcending Objective of Human Life
- The Causes of the Inclination to Materialism (A Translation from Persian)
- Towards a Better Life
- Lectures on the Principles of Religion
- Life History of the Holy Prophet (of Islam)
- The Issues of Imamate (the Islamic Leadership) and Welayet (Authority) in the Glorious Qur'an
- Social Evolution of Human Being
- About "Globalization"
- Self-Recovery
- On Idealism and Realism
- God and Nature
- Islamic Unity based on Scientific authority of Ahlal-Bayte
- Lectures on Quran Science
- Islamic Minorities
- Unity and proximity of Islamic religious
- Opinion of dialogue with others
- Common traditions in three volumes
