= Ebrahim Amini =

Iranian Ayatollah (1925-2020)

Ayatollah Ebrahim Amini
- ابراهیم امینی
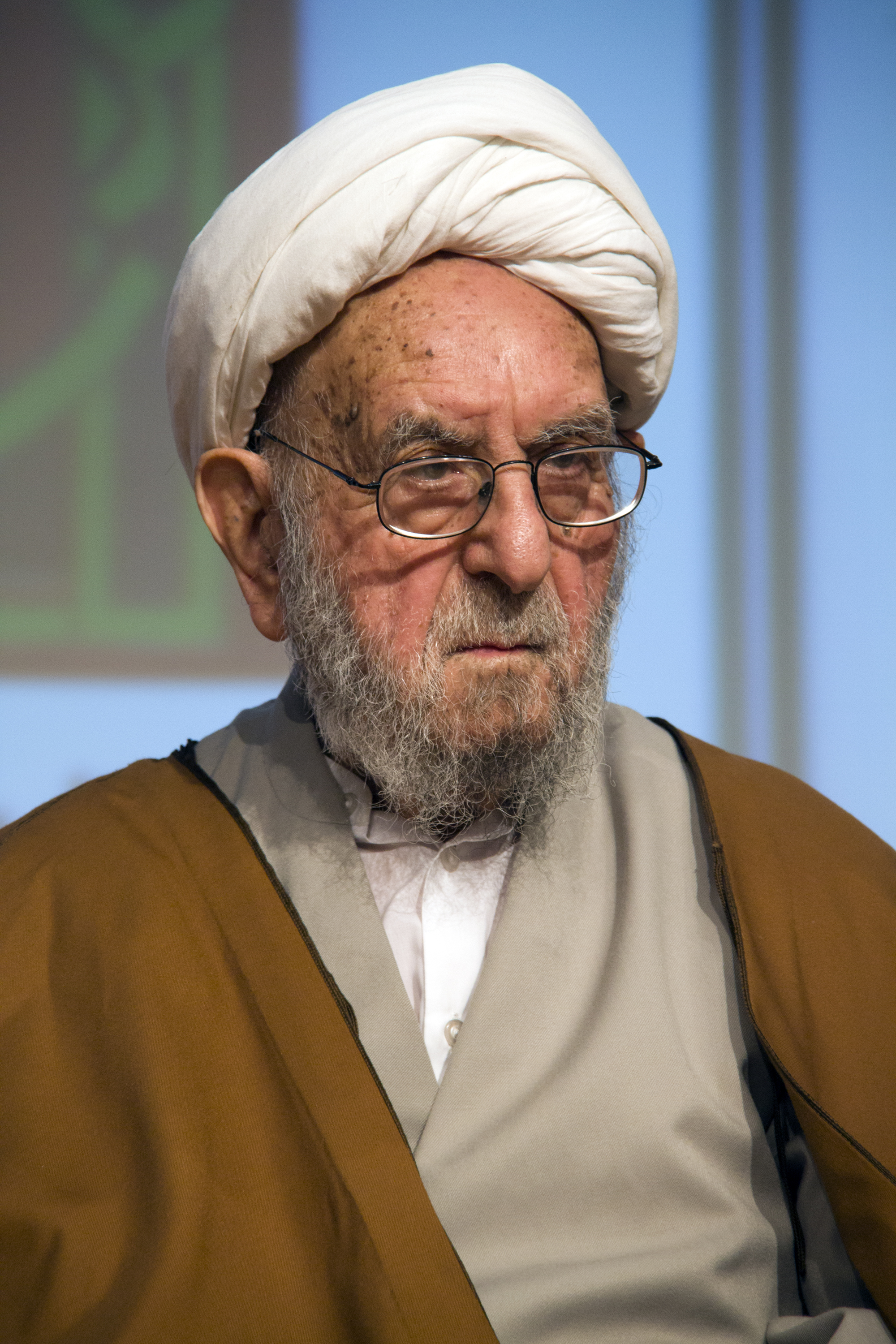
- Amini in 2016

Member of the Assembly of Experts
- In office 24 May 2016 – 24 April 2020
- Constituency: Tehran Province
- Majority: 1,904,524
- In office 15 August 1983 – 19 February 2007
- Constituency: Chaharmahal and Bakhtiari Province

Second Deputy Chairman of the Assembly of Experts
- In office 1985–2006
- Preceded by: Mohammad Mehdi Rabbani Amlishi
- Succeeded by: Mohammad Yazdi

Member of the Expediency Discernment Council
- In office 17 March 1997 – 24 April 2020

Personal details
- Born: Ebrahim Haj Amini Najafabadi; 30 June 1925 Najaf Abad, Isfahan Province, Sublime State of Persia
- Died: 24 April 2020 (aged 94) Qom, Qom Province, Iran
- Resting place: Fatima Masumeh Shrine
- Party: Society of Seminary Teachers of Qom
- Education: Esfahan Seminary; Qom Seminary
- Occupation: Cleric; Politician
- Website: ibrahimamini.com

Ebrahim Haj Amini Najafabadi (Persian: ابراهیم حاج امینی نجف‌آبادی; 30 June 1925 – 24 April 2020) was an Iranian principlist politician who was a member of the Assembly of Experts. He was also a member of the Expediency Discernment Council, and was previously identified as a possible candidate to become the next Iranian Supreme Leader. Ayatollah Amini was a jurist and a moderate supporter of jurisprudential Islam. He was a member of the Council for the Revision of the Second Constitution in 1989 and was a supporter of the maximum ruling term of a Supreme Leader being ten years.

== Life ==
Ibrahim Haj Amini Najafabadi was born in 1925 in Najafabad. He completed his primary education in there and entered the Isfahan seminary in 1943 and studied Arabic literature, logic, principles and jurisprudence. In 1944, he moved to the Qom seminary to continue his education in fiqh and principles from Hossein Borujerdi, Mohammad Taqi Khansari, Mohammad Hojjat Kohkamri, Ruhollah Khomeini, and studied the philosophy of Asfar under Mohammad Hossein Tabatabai. Following the 1979 Iranian Revolution, he received two decrees from Khomeini.

Amini was known as a critic of the government of former president Mahmoud Ahmadinejad.

Amini died in April 2020 at the age of 94, at the Shahid Beheshti Hospital in Qom.

== See also ==
- 1989 Iranian constitutional referendum
- List of ayatollahs
- List of members in the First Term of the Assembly of Experts
