= The Two Societies =

The Two Societies جامعتین
- Leader of SST: Hashem Hosseini Bushehri
- Leader of CCA: Mostafa Pourmohammadi
- Ideology: Political Islam; Islamic Principlism; Ja'fari jurisprudence Guardianship of the Islamic Jurists; Khomeinism
- Political position: Right-wing
- Religion: Shia Islam
- National affiliation: Principlists
- Assembly of Experts: 60 / 88
- Guardian Council jurisprudences: 6 / 6
- Tehran Interim Friday Prayer Imams: 5 / 5

The Two Societies (Persian: جامعتین, Jāme'atein) is the nickname given to the coalition of two influential Iranian principlist clerical religious–political groups, Combatant Clergy Association of Tehran and Society of Seminary Teachers of Qom.

The Two Societies declared a shared electoral list for 2006 Iranian Assembly of Experts election and won 69 seats out of 86. In 2016 elections, the two societies did not reach a coalition and issued different lists, eventually winning 64≈66 seats out of 88.

They also dominate Guardian Council.
