= Mohammad Yazdi =

Iranian Ayatollah (1931–2020)

Ayatollah Mohammad Yazdi
- محمد یزدی
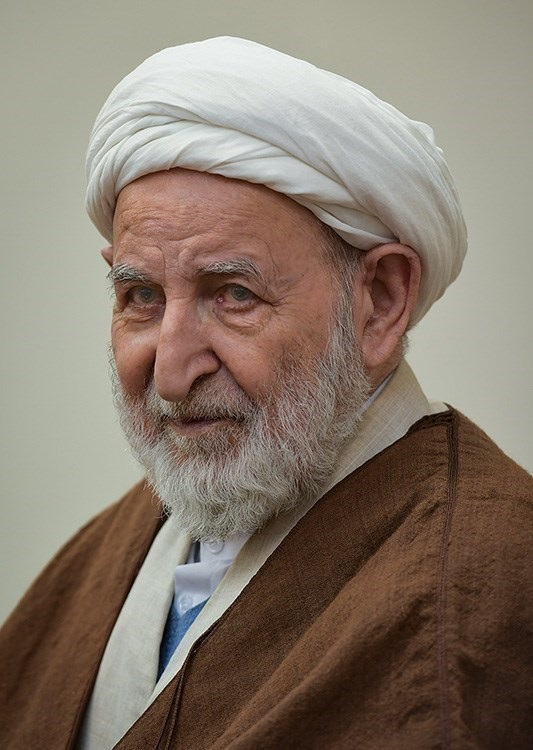
- Yazdi in 2019

Chairman of the Assembly of Experts
- In office 10 March 2015 – 24 May 2016
- Preceded by: Mohammad-Reza Mahdavi Kani
- Succeeded by: Ahmad Jannati

4th Chief Justice of Iran
- In office 15 August 1989 – 14 August 1999
- Appointed by: Ali Khamenei
- Preceded by: Abdul-Karim Mousavi Ardebili
- Succeeded by: Mahmoud Hashemi Shahroudi

Member of the Assembly of Experts
- In office 21 February 1991 – 23 May 2016
- Constituency: Tehran Province
- Majority: 970,192 (4th assembly)

Member of the Parliament of Iran
- In office 28 May 1984 – 27 May 1988
- Constituency: Tehran, Rey and Shemiranat
- Majority: 156,049 (93.1%)
- In office 28 May 1980 – 27 May 1984
- Constituency: Qom
- Majority: 129,678 (83.1%)

Member of Assembly of Experts for the Constitution
- In office 19 August 1979 – 15 November 1979
- Constituency: Bakhtaran Province
- Majority: 101,735 (46%)

Personal details
- Born: 2 July 1931 Esfahan, Imperial State of Iran
- Died: 9 December 2020 (aged 89) Qom, Iran
- Resting place: Fatima Masumeh Shrine
- Party: Combatant Clergy Association; Society of Seminary Teachers of Qom
- Other political affiliations: Islamic Republican Party (1979–1987)
- Spouse: Batoul Azari (died 2020)
- Children: 4

Mohammad Yazdi (Persian: محمد یزدی; 2 July 1931 – 9 December 2020) was an Iranian conservative and principlist cleric who served as the head of Judiciary System of Iran between 1989 and 1999. In 2015, he was elected to lead Iran's Assembly of Experts, defeating Akbar Hashemi Rafsanjani, a former president, by a vote count of 47 to 24.

== Early life ==
Mohammad Yazdi was born in 1931 to a religious family at Isfahan. Sheikh Ali Yazdi, his father, was a student of Sheikh Abdul Karim Haeri and at one of the Isfahan mosques as chief mullah for Friday prayers and ceremonies investigated the people's problems.

=== Education ===
At first, Ayatollah Yazdi learned Persian language from his father and then went to Maktab. Also he departed to newly founded school to continue his education. When he went to Qom, he resided at the Feyziyeh School and learned religious courses from scholars such as Mohammad Ali Araki, Ayatollah Sheikh Muhammad Taqi Amoli, Ayatollah Shahroudi, Grand Ayatollah Hossein Borujerdi and Ruhollah Khomeini.

== Political career ==
=== Before victory of Iranian Revolution ===
Ayatollah Yazdi usually gave the lectures at mosques and house of scholars. Also he taught Morality course at the Feyziyeh School and discussed politic subjects. Mohammad Yazdi was exiled by SAVAK many times to Bandar Lengeh, Bushehr and Rudbar.

=== After victory of Iranian Revolution ===
After Ayatollah Khamenei became leader of the Islamic Republic, Ayatollah Yazdi served as the president of the Supreme Court. He remained in the post for many years before being replaced by Muhammad Hashemi Shahroudi. Yazdi was a member of the Assembly of Experts and the Guardian Council. He served as the interim Friday prayer leader of Tehran.

This is some of the political career of Ayatollah Yazdi after The Islamic Revolution as follows:

- Management of Imam Khomeini's Office in Qom
- Member of the dispute resolution council between Mohammad-Ali Rajai and Abolhassan Banisadr
- Member of the Assembly of Experts constitution in 1979
- Temporary Tehran's Friday Prayer Imam, 1982 to late 1990s
- Chief Justice of Iran 1989 to 1999
- Member of the Assembly of Experts, 1991 to 2016
- Member of Iranian Parliament from 1980 to 1988 in Qom and Tehran
- Vice chairman of Iranian Parliament in the first and second periods
- Member of Guardian Council in the periods of the second, fourth, fifth, sixth and seventh
- One of the founders and secretary of Society of Seminary Teachers of Qom

== Political views ==
=== United States ===
In the run-up to the February 2016 elections, Yazdi opposed bilateral relations with the United States. In the popular election held in February 2016 for Assembly of Experts candidates, incumbent Chairman Yazdi was not among the 16 experts who received enough votes to represent Tehran in the Fifth Assembly of Experts.

Many western media outlets pointed to Yazdi's exit from the Assembly when providing and emphasizing the gains that reformists made in the 2016 elections. In a speech congratulating those elected to the Fifth Assembly of Experts, Yazdi advocated for peaceful, moderate relations with other countries, but went on to warn about dealing with enemies and characterized America as "The Great Satan". Two days later, Fars News Agency reported the Supreme Leader Ayatollah Khamenei lamented the Assembly's loss of Yazdi as chairman and warned of the risk that the West could influence or infiltrate Iran. As of 9 May 2016, Yazdi remained on the Guardian Council, which vets potential candidates for the Assembly of Experts. During Yazdi's tenure on the Guardian Council, human-rights organizations have criticized the Guardian Council's disqualification of reform candidates in the 2016 elections.

== Sanctions ==
In February 2020, the U.S. Treasury Department sanctioned Yazdi for "preventing free and fair elections in Iran."

== Work ==
Ayatollah Yazdi authored several books in English and Persian such as, Your missing, Answers of Mardooq's accusations and Imamah in Shia Islam.

== Death ==
Yazdi died on 9 December 2020. He was buried in Qom later that day.

== See also ==
- List of ayatollahs
- Council for Spreading Mahmoud Ahmadinejad's Thoughts
- Haghani Circle
- History of principle-ism in Iran
- Society of Seminary Teachers of Qom

Legal offices
Preceded by Abdolkarim Mousavi Ardebili	Head of judiciary of Islamic Republic of Iran; 1989–1999	Succeeded by Mahmoud Hashemi Shahroudi
