= Society of Seminary Teachers of Qom =

Society of Seminary Teachers of Qom جامعهٔ مدرسین حوزهٔ علمیهٔ قم
- Leader: Hashem Hosseini Bushehri
- Founded: 1961/3
- Headquarters: Qom
- Ideology: Khomeinism; Ja'fari jurisprudence Conservatism (Iranian)
- Political position: Right-wing
- Religion: Shia Islam
- National affiliation: Principlists
- Part of: The Two Societies
- Guardian Council: 6 / 12 (50%)
- Expediency Discernment Council: 9 / 48 (19%)
- Assembly of Experts: 8 / 88 (9%)

Website
- jameehmodarresin.org

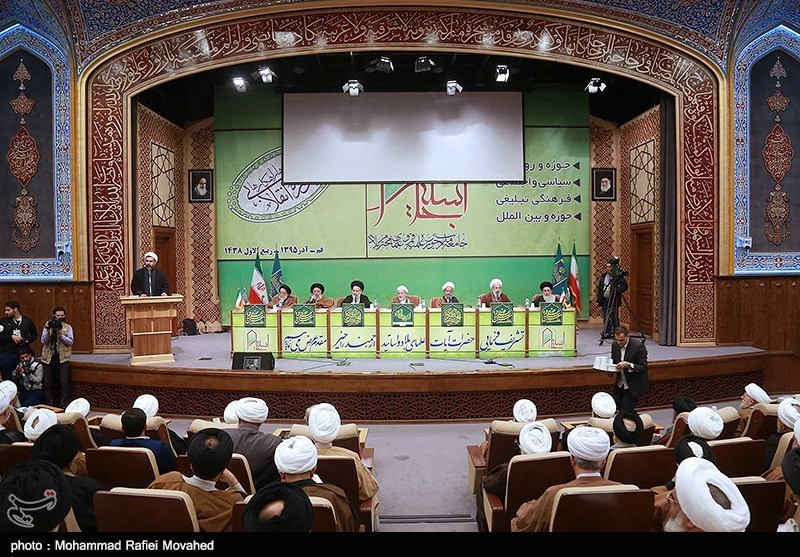
Hawza Qom Lecturers Annual Assembly - 2016

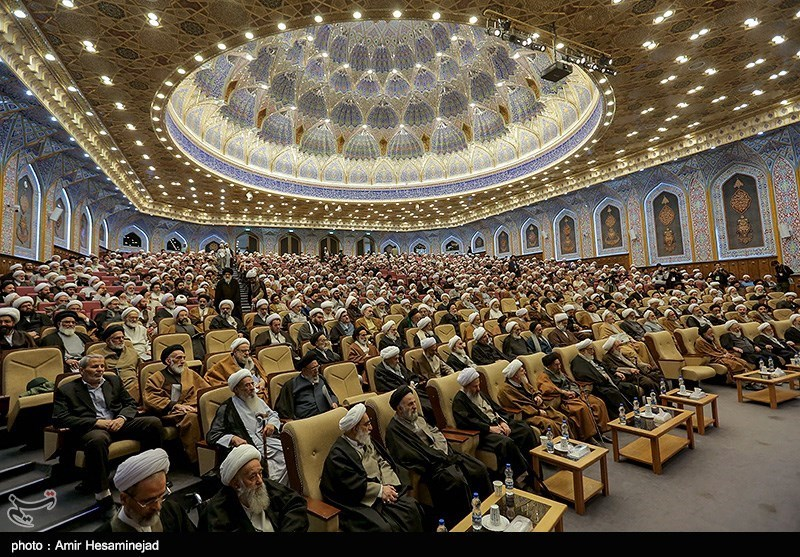
Hawza Qom Lecturers Annual Assembly - 2016

The Society of Seminary Teachers of Qom (Persian: جامعهٔ مدرسین حوزهٔ علمیهٔ قم, romanized: jâme'e madrasin howze 'ilmiah Qom) is an Iranian group founded in 1961/3 by the leading Muslim clerics of Qom. Established by the students of Ayatollah Khomeini after his exile to Iraq, it was formed in order to organize political activities of Khomeini's followers and promote his revolutionary interpretation of Islam, such as the idea of Islamic government.

Since the 1979 revolution, it has largely become the body to keep the regime's registrar of who counts as a grand ayatollah, an ayatollah and a hojjat ul Islam. It has a head who is appointed by the Supreme Leader of the Islamic Republic. It currently heads the Supreme Council of Qom Hawzas, and proposes judges to the judiciary system.

The body gained international prominence when it announced in 1981 that Ayatollah Shariatmadari was no longer a source of emulation (marja'). It has demoted a number of clerics over the last three decades. A recent case was that of Ayatollah Yousef Saanei, who for his solidarity with the green movement was demoted from marja' to Hujjat al-Islam. The society also includes Ayatollah Sistani on its list.

== Founders ==
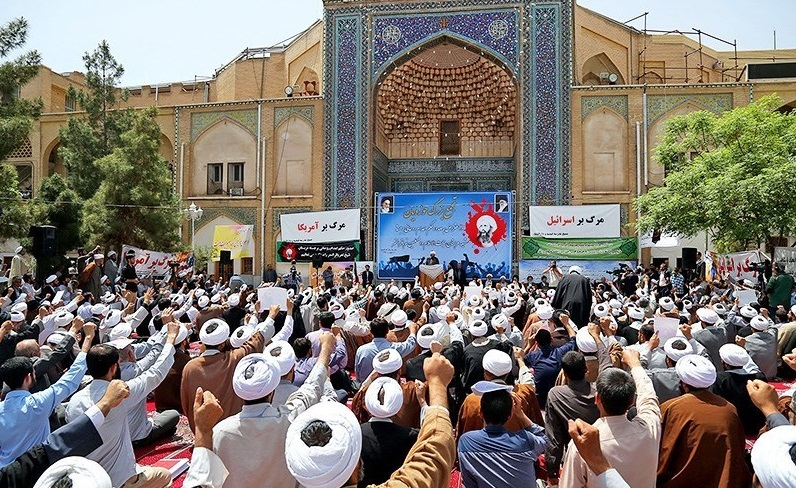
Qom Seminary

Its founders, none of whom were ayatollahs at the time, were:

- Fazel Lankarani
- Azari Qomi
- Ebrahim Amini
- Ali Meshkini
- Hossein-Ali Montazeri
- Qoddusi
- Rabbani Shirazi

== Current members ==
- Ayatollah Morteza Moghtadai
- Grand Ayatollah Naser Makarem Shirazi
- Grand Ayatollah Hossein Mazaheri
- Ayatollah Ahmad Khatami
- Ayatollah Ahmad Jannati
- Ayatollah Hashem Hosseini Bushehri

== Late members ==
- Grand Ayatollah Mohammad Fazel Lankarani
- Grand Ayatollah Moslem Malakouti
- Grand Ayatollah Hussein-Ali Montazeri
- Ayatollah Ali Meshkini
- Ayatollah Abolghasem Khazali
- Ayatollah Mohammad-Hadi Ma'refat
- Ayatollah Ahmad Azari Qomi
- Ayatollah Ebrahim Amini
- Ayatollah Mohammad Yazdi
- Ayatollah Mohammad Taqi Mesbah Yazdi

== Activities ==
The society approves a list of marjas in Qom. In 1963 the society declared Ayatollah Khomeini as marja'. In 1994, after the death of Grand Ayatollah Mohammad Ali Araki, the society nominated seven of the Ulama as his successors to be marja', including Ayatollah Khamenei.

In 2022, during Iranian protests, the society urged the authorities to execute and use the amputation punishment to deter people from joining the protests.

== See also ==
- List of ayatollahs
- List of maraji
- Marja
- Ayatollah
- Ijtihad
- History of principle-ism in Iran
- Council for Spreading Mahmoud Ahmadinejad's Thoughts
- Haghani Circle
- List of current maraji
- List of deceased maraji

== Bibliography ==
The Society of Teachers from Qom Seminary from the Beginning to the present, Seyyed Mohsen Saleh and Alireza Javadzadeh, Publisher: Islamic Revolution Documentation Center
