= Combatant Clergy Association =

Political organisation in Iran

Combatant Clergy Association جامعه روحانیت مبارز
- General Secretary: Mostafa Pourmohammadi
- Spokesperson: Gholamreza Mesbahi-Moghaddam
- Founded: 6 November 1977 (48 years, 292 days)
- Headquarters: Tehran
- Ideology: Khomeinism; Iranian nationalism
- Political position: Right-wing
- Religion: Shia Islam
- Parliament: 13 / 290
- Assembly of Experts: 6 / 88
- Expediency Discernment Council: 2 / 48

Website
- Official website

The Combatant Clergy Association (Persian: جامعه روحانیت مبارز, romanized: Jâme'e-ye Ruhâniat-e Mobârez) is a politically active group in Iran, but not a political party in the traditional sense.

The CCA has never been registered as a political party; however, it acts as a fragmented caucus and has actively operated in the electoral arena, competing for votes. Thus, it is considered an elite party and can be classified as a political party according to the minimalist definition by Angelo Panebianco. The traditional conservative clerical association was the majority party in the fourth and fifth parliaments after the Islamic revolution.

The organization has great influence over non-elective institutions such as the judicial system, the Guardian Council and Revolutionary Guard Corps.

== History ==
After the 15 Khordad demonstration of 1963 failed in Iran, it was felt that a more coherent organization was needed for Iran's anti-Shah movement. The association was founded in 1977 by a group of clerics with intentions to use Islamic culture and traditions to overthrow the Shah. Although the exact founding members of the group are unsure, some of them were said to be Ali Khamenei, Morteza Motahhari, Mohammad Beheshti, Mohammad Javad Bahonar, Akbar Hashemi Rafsanjani, Fazlollah Mahallati and Mohammad Mofatteh, and its current members include founding member Ali Khamenei.

The Combatant Clergy Association was one of the few republican groups active before the Iran–Iraq War. A "free political atmosphere" was not provided in Iran due to the special conditions of wartime, and the Combatant Clergy Association was the only active political organisation after the dissolution of the Islamic Republican Party (All IRP clerics were members of CCA but not all CCA founders were members of IRP). By the emergence of factional differences in government of Mir Hossein Mousavi, the organization was divided, and Association of Combatant Clerics was formed.

=== Recent years ===
CCA is suffering from unresolved contention between its elites. Hassan Rouhani, president of Iran between 2013 and 2021, is a member of the faction although he has been inactive and not participated their regular sessions since the disputed 2009 presidential elections, a situation that applies to Ali Akbar Nategh-Nouri and Akbar Hashemi Rafsanjani as well. The association however backed Rafsanjani and Rouhani in 2016 Assembly of Experts election and included both on its list, despite backing Rouhani's rival, Ebrahim Raisi, for president in 2017.

== Goals and activities ==
The association brought together anti-Shah clerics and bazaaris. It also aimed to preserve the revolution and its achievements. Supporting the Guardianship of the Islamic Jurist and state organization are some of the group's goals. The association does not recognize itself as a political party and hence does not have any written strategy or policy. The association mostly announces its political viewpoints around election time.

Members of the association have had important positions in the different governments of Iran. By 2004, four out of eight presidents of the executive branch of the government had been selected from this association. Also, the president of the judicial branch of the government was one of the members of the association, Ayatollah Mohammad Yazdi, for two five-year periods, from 1989 to 1999.

=== Political position ===
The CCA is a right-wing Khomeinist group; it actively supports Iranian Shia theocracy and is an Islamic nationalist, Iranian nationalist, anti-imperialist and anti-Zionist.

=== Foreign policy ===
The association believes in making diplomatic relationships with all world countries except the United States and Israel, and their criteria in this regard is avoiding both being dominated by other countries and domination over others. However, they believe that there can be relationships with France and the United Kingdom under defined conditions. The association believes that there are intrinsic differences between the value system of Iran and western societies.

== Funding ==
The fourth chapter of the Combatant Clergy Association's statute deals with the financial issues of the association.

== Election results ==
=== Presidential elections ===
President of Iran
Election year	Candidate	First round			Second round			Result
Election year	Candidate	Votes	%	Rank	Votes	%	Rank	Result
1981	Ali Khamenei	16,007,072	95.01%	1st	—N/a			Won
1985	Ali Khamenei	12,203,870	87.9%	1st	—N/a			Won
1989	Akbar Hashemi Rafsanjani	15,537,394	94.5%	1st	—N/a			Won
1993	Akbar Hashemi Rafsanjani	10,449,933	64.0%	1st	—N/a			Won
1997	Ali Akbar Nategh-Nouri	7,242,859	24.91%	▼2nd	—N/a			Lost
2001	Did not participate							
2005	Akbar Hashemi Rafsanjani	6,179,653	22.00%	2nd	10,046,701	36.76	2nd	Lost
2009	Tactical voting to Mahmoud Ahmadinejad	24,592,793	63.14%	▲1st	—N/a			Won
2013	Suppurting to Ali Akbar Velayati	2,268,753	6.18%	▼5th	—N/a			Lost
2017	Ebrahim Raisi	15,835,794	39.43%	▲2nd	—N/a			Lost
2021	Ebrahim Raisi	18,021,945	72.35%	▲1st	—N/a			Won
2024	Mostafa Pourmohammadi	206,397	0.88%	▼4th	—N/a			Lost

=== Parliament ===
Election	Exclusive seats	±	%	Rank	Alliance
1988	90 / 270	Steady	33.33%	▲2nd	Faction right
1992	134 / 270	▲44	49.62%	▲1st	Faction right
1996	110 / 270	▼24	40.74%	1st	FFLIL
2000	54 / 290	▼56	18.62%	▼2nd	FFLIL
2004	196 / 290	▲142	67.58%	▲1st	ABII
2008	137 / 290	▼59	47.24%	1st	UFP
2012	133 / 290	▼4	45.86%	1st	UFP
2016	84 / 290	▼49	28.96%	▼2nd	PGC
2020	177 / 290	▲93	61.03%	▲1st	CCIRF
2024	13 / 290	▼164	4.48%	▼4th	UCIRF

=== Assembly of Experts ===
Election	Seats won	+/−	Alliance	Ref
1982	65 / 86 (76%)	Steady	Faction right	
1990	73 / 86 (85%)	▲8	Faction right	
1998	69 / 86 (80%)	▼4	Faction right	
2006	59 / 86 (69%)	▼10	Principlists	
2016	66 / 88 (75%)	▲7	Principlists	
2024	58 / 88 (66%)	▼8	Principlists	

== List of General Secretaries ==
#	Name	Tenure	Ref
1	Fazlollah Mahallati	1977–31 October 1981	
2	Mohammad Reza Mahdavi Kani	1 November 1981 – 21 October 2014	
—	Mohammed Emami-Kashani (interim)	1996	
3	Ali Movahedi-Kermani	2 December 2014 – 30 May 2018	
4	Mostafa Pourmohammadi	30 May 2018–present	
