= List of ayatollahs =

This is a partial list of ayatollahs, a title given to high ranked Twelver Usuli Shi'a Muslim clerics. Its ranking is higher than Hujjat al-Islam, and the next higher clerical rank is grand ayatollah also known as marja'. This list contains only the names of ayatollahs. To see lists of grand ayatollahs, or hujjatul islams, see the following articles: List of maraji; List of hujjatul Islams.

== Current ==
No	Image	Name	Birth Date CE	Birth Place	Residence	Notes
1		Mohammad Bagher Bagheri Kani محمدباقر باقری کنی	1926 (age 99–100)	(Pahlavi Iran) Tehran, Iran	Iran	-
2		Ahmad Mohseni Garakani احمد محسنی گرکانی	1926 (age 99–100)	(Pahlavi Iran) Garakan, Iran	Iran	-
3		Ahmad Jannati احمد جنتی	23 February 1927 (age 99)	(Pahlavi Iran) Isfahan, Iran	Iran	-
4		Seyed Ali Akbar Ghoreyshi سید علی اکبر قریشی	1928 (age 97–98)	(Pahlavi Iran) Bonab, Iran	Iran	-
5		al-Sayyid Murtadha al-Musawi al-Qazwini السيد مرتضى الموسوي القزويني	1 August 1930 (age 96)	(Kingdom of Iraq) Karbala, Iraq	Karbala, Iraq	-
6		Mohammad-Ali Movahedi-Kermani محمدعلی موحدی کرمانی	1932 (age 93–94)	(Pahlavi Iran) Kerman, Iran	Iran	-
7		Ali Akbar Masoudi Khomeini علی‌اکبر مسعودی خمینی	1932 (age 93–94)	(Pahlavi Iran) Khomeyn, Iran	Iran	-
8		Seyed Hassan Mortazavi Shahroudi سید حسن مرتضوی شاهرودی	22 February 1933 (age 93)	(Pahlavi Iran) Shahrud, Iran	Iran	-
9		Hassan Shariati Niyasar حسن شریعتی نیاسر	21 March 1933 (age 93)	(Pahlavi Iran) Neyasar, Iran	Iran	-
10		Morteza Moghtadai مرتضی مقتدایی	12 October 1935 (age 91)	(Pahlavi Iran) Isfahan, Iran	Iran	-
11		Seyyed Mohammad Khamenei سید محمد خامنه‌ای	25 December 1935 (age 90)	(Pahlavi Iran) Mashhad, Iran	Iran	-
12		Abolghasem Wafi Yazdi ابوالقاسم وافی یزدی	1935 (age 90–91)	(Pahlavi Iran) Hoseynabad, Iran	Iran	-
13		Ahmad Beheshti احمد بهشتی	1935 (age 90–91)	(Pahlavi Iran) Fasa, Iran	Iran	-
14		Reza Ostadi Moghaddam رضا استادی مقدم	29 September 1937 (age 89)	(Pahlavi Iran) Tehran, Iran	Iran	-
15		Seyyed Mohsen Kharazi سید محسن خرازی	1937 (age 88–89)	(Pahlavi Iran) Tehran, Iran	Iran	-
16		Hashem Hashemzadeh Herisi هاشم هاشم‌زاده هریسی	1938 (age 87–88)	(Pahlavi Iran) Heris, Iran	Iran	-
17		Seyyed Ali Shafiei سیدعلی شفیعی	1940 (age 85–86)	(Pahlavi Iran) Dezful, Iran	Ahvaz, Iran	
18		Kazem Nourmofidi کاظم نورمفیدی	1940 (age 85–86)	(Pahlavi Iran) Gorgan, Iran	Golestan province, Iran	-
19		Sayyid Mohammad-Ali Mousavi Jazayeri سیدمحمدعلی موسوی جزایری	1941 (age 84–85)	(Pahlavi Iran) Shushtar, Iran	Iran	-
20		Mahmoud Mar'ashi Najafi محمود مرعشی نجفی	1941 (age 84–85)	(Pahlavi Iran) Qom, Iran	Iran	-
21		Syed Riaz Hussain Najafi سید ریاض حسین نجفی	1941 (age 84–85)	(British Raj) Alipur, British India	Lahore, Pakistan	-
22		Sayyid Mohammad Mousavi Khoeiniha سید محمد موسوی خوئینی ها	1942 (age 83–84)	(Pahlavi Iran) Qazvin, Iran	Iran	-
23		al-Sayyid Mujtaba al-Hussayni al-Shirazi السيد مجتبى الحسيني الشيرازي	6 August 1943 (age 83)	(Kingdom of Iraq) Karbala, Iraq	London, United Kingdom	-
24		Ahmad Alamolhoda احمد علم‌الهدی	1 September 1944 (age 82)	(Pahlavi Iran) Mashhad, Iran	Iran	-
25		Hossein Ansarian حسین انصاریان	9 November 1944 (age 82)	(Pahlavi Iran) Khansar, Iran	Iran	-
26		Seyed Yousef Tabatabai Nejad سید یوسف طباطبایی نژاد	1944 (age 81–82)	(Pahlavi Iran) Ardestan, Iran	Iran	-
27		Seyyed Mostafa Mousavi Faraz سید مصطفی موسوی فراز	1945 (age 80–81)	(Pahlavi Iran) Isfahan, Iran	Iran	-
28		Mohammad Reza Naseri Yazdi محمدرضا ناصری یزدی	1945 (age 80–81)	(Pahlavi Iran) Yazd, Iran	Iran	-
29		Mostafa Mohaghegh Damad مصطفی محقق داماد	1945 (age 80–81)	(Pahlavi Iran) Qom, Iran	Iran	-
30		Morteza Sadouqi Mazandarani مرتضی صدوقی مازندرانی	22 July 1946 (age 80)	(Pahlavi Iran) Iran	Iran	-
31		Hossein Mousavi Tabrizi حسین موسوی تبریزی	1947 (age 78–79)	(Pahlavi Iran) Tabriz, Iran	Iran	-
32		al-Sayyid Hadi al-Hussayni al-Modarresi السيد هادي الحسيني المدرسي	1947 (age 78–79)	(Kingdom of Iraq) Karbala, Iraq	Iraq	Official Website
33		al-Sayyid Ali al-Hussayni al-Milani السيد علي الحسيني الميلاني	1948 (age 77–78)	(Kingdom of Iraq) Najaf, Iraq	Qom, Iran	Official Website
34		al-Sayyid Ali al-Musawi al-Sabziwari السيد علي الموسوي السبزواري	1948 (age 77–78)	(Kingdom of Iraq) Najaf, Iraq	Najaf, Iraq	-
35		Muhammad Baqir al-Irawani محمد باقر الإيرواني	1949 (age 76–77)	(Kingdom of Iraq) Najaf, Iraq	Iraq	-
36		Ghorbanali Dorri-Najafabadi قربانعلی دری نجف‌آبادی	3 December 1950 (age 75)	(Pahlavi Iran) Najafabad, Isfahan, Iran	Iran	-
37		Gholamreza Mesbahi-Moghaddam غلامرضا مصباحی مقدم	11 July 1951 (age 75)	(Pahlavi Iran) Mashhad, Iran	Iran	-
38		Seyyed Mohammad Saeedi سید محمد سعیدی	1951 (age 74–75)	(Pahlavi Iran) Qom, Iran	Iran	-
39		Mohammad Taghi Vaezi محمد تقی واعظی	1951 (age 74–75)	(Pahlavi Iran) Tehran, Iran	Iran	-
40		Mohsen Faqihi محسن فقیهی	17 November 1952 (age 73)	(Pahlavi Iran) Iran	Iran	-
41		Ibrahim Yaqoub Zakzaky ابراهیم یعقوبی زکزکی	5 May 1953 (age 73)	(Colonial Nigeria) Zaria, Nigeria	Nigeria	-
42		Mehdi Shabzendedar Jahromi مهدی شب‌زنده‌دار جهرمی	1953 (age 72–73)	(Pahlavi Iran) Darab, Iran	Iran	-
43		Seyyed Mahmoud Alavi سید محمود علوی	4 May 1954 (age 72)	(Pahlavi Iran) Lamerd, Iran	Iran	-
44		Seyed Mojtaba Hosseini سید مجتبی حسینی	1954 (age 71–72)	(Pahlavi Iran) Mashhad, Iran	Iran	-
45		Seyyed Mohammad Reza Modarresi Yazdi سید محمدرضا مدرسی یزدی	1955 (age 70–71)	(Pahlavi Iran) Yazd, Iran	Iran	-
46		Ali Akbar Rashad علی‌اکبر رشاد	1955 (age 70–71)	(Pahlavi Iran) Iran	Iran	-
47		Abdol-Hamid Masoumi-Tehrani عبدالحمید معصومی تهرانی	1955 (age 70–71)	(Pahlavi Iran) Tehran, Iran	Tehran, Iran	-
48		Mohsen Araki محسن اراکی	1956 (age 69–70)	(Ba'athist Iraq) Najaf, Iraq	Iran	-
49		Seyyed Hashem Hosseini Bushehri سید هاشم حسینی بوشهری	1956 (age 69–70)	(Pahlavi Iran) Bushehr, Iran	Iran	-
50		Mohammad Taghi Pourmohammadi محمدتقی پورمحمدی	1956 (age 69–70)	(Pahlavi Iran) Marand, Iran	Iran	-
51		al-Sayyid Ali Akbar al-Hussayni al-Modarresi السيد علي أكبر الحسيني المدرسي	17 September 1957 (age 69)	(Kingdom of Iraq) Karbala, Iraq	Mashhad, Iran	-
52		Mohsen Heidari Alekasir محسن حیدری آل کثیر	1957 (age 68–69)	(Pahlavi Iran) Shush, Iran	Iran	-
53		Seyyed Mohammad Hossein Kazemeyni Borojerdi سید محمدحسین کاظمینی بروجردی	1 August 1958 (age 68)	(Pahlavi Iran) Qom, Iran	Iran	-
54		al-Sayyid Riyadh Al-Hakim السيد رياض الحكيم	18 January 1959 (age 67)	(Ba'athist Iraq) Najaf, Iraq	Iraq	-
55		Gholam Ali Safai Bushehri غلامعلی صفایی بوشهری	23 June 1959 (age 67)	(Pahlavi Iran) Bushehr, Iran	Iran	-
56		Seyyed Ahmad Hosseini Khorasani سید احمد حسینی خراسانی	1959 (age 66–67)	(Pahlavi Iran) Shirvan, Iran	Iran	-
57		Alireza Arafi علی رضا اعرافی	1959 (age 66–67)	(Pahlavi Iran) Meybod, Iran	Iran	-
58		Ahmad Khatami احمد خاتمی	8 May 1960 (age 66)	(Pahlavi Iran) Semnan, Iran	Iran	-
59		Sadiq Ardashir Larijani صادق اردشیر لاریجانی	12 March 1961 (age 65)	(Ba'athist Iraq) Najaf, Iraq	Iran	-
60		Mahdi Mirbaqiri مهدی میرباقری	1961 (age 64–65)	(Pahlavi Iran) Qom, Iran	Iran	-
61		Abolghasem Alidoust ابوالقاسم علیدوست	1961 (age 64–65)	(Pahlavi Iran) Yazd, Iran	Iran	-
62		Hasan Amili حسن عاملی	5 June 1962 (age 64)	(Pahlavi Iran) Ardabil, Iran	Iran	-
63		Mostafa Boroujerdi مصطفی بروجردی	1 August 1962 (age 64)	(Pahlavi Iran) Qom, Iran	Iran	-
64		al-Sayyid Muhammad Ridha al-Hussayni al-Sistani السيد محمد رضا الحسيني السيستاني	18 August 1962 (age 64)	(Ba'athist Iraq) Najaf, Iraq	Iraq	-
65		Abbas Ka'bi عباس کعبی	1962 (age 63–64)	(Pahlavi Iran) Ahvaz, Iran	Iran	-
66		Lotfallah Dejkam لطف‌الله دژکام	1962 (age 63–64)	(Pahlavi Iran) Jahrom, Iran	Iran	-
67		Abbas Tabrizian عباس تبریزیان	1962 (age 63–64)	(Ba'athist Iraq) Najaf, Iraq	Iran	-
68		Reza Ramezani Gilani رضا رمضانی گیلانی	1963 (age 62–63)	(Pahlavi Iran) Rasht, Iran	Iran	-
69		Syed Aqeel-ul-Gharavi سيد عقيل الغروى	2 February 1964 (age 62)	Banaras, India	London, United Kingdom	Official Website
70		Abdul Karim Farhani عبدالکریم فرحانی	1964 (age 61–62)	(Pahlavi Iran) Ahvaz, Iran	Iran	-
71		al-Sayyid Ali al-Hakim السيد علي الحكيم	1964 (age 61–62)	(Ba'athist Iraq) Najaf, Iraq	Lebanon	-
72		al-Sayyid Murtadha al-Hussayni al-Shirazi السيد مرتضى الحسيني الشيرازي	1964 (age 61–62)	(Ba'athist Iraq) Karbala, Iraq	Najaf, Iraq	-
73		al-Sayyid Jafar al-Hakim السيد جعفر الحكيم	1965 (age 60–61)	(Ba'athist Iraq) Najaf, Iraq	Najaf, Iraq	-
74		Seyyed Nasir Hosseini سید نصیر حسینی	1967 (age 58–59)	(Pahlavi Iran) Yasuj, Iran	Iran	-
75		Seyyed Mojtaba Hosseini Khamenei سید مجتبی حسینی خامنه‌ای	8 September 1969 (age 57)	(Pahlavi Iran) Mashhad, Iran	Iran	Current Supreme Leader of Iran. Son of the late Supreme Leader of Iran (Ali Khamenei)
76		al-Sayyid Hussein al-Hussayni al-Shirazi السید حسین الحسیني الشیرازي	1970 (age 55–56)	(Ba'athist Iraq) Karbala, Iraq	Qom, Iran	-

== Deceased ==
No	Image	Name	Year of Birth (CE)	Year of Death (CE)	Birth	Death	Notes
1		al-Sayyid Muhammad Saeed al-Habboubi السيد محمد سعيد الحبوبي	1849	1915 (aged 65–66)	(Ottoman Empire) Najaf, Ottoman Iraq	(Ottoman Empire) Nasiriyah, Ottoman Iraq	-
2		Seyed Ali Tabrizi سید علی تبریزی	1844	7 December 1917 (aged 72–73)	(Qajar Iran) Tabriz, Sublime State of Persia	(Qajar Iran) Tabriz, Sublime State of Persia	-
3		Mohammad Aghazadeh Khorasani محمد آقازاده خراسانی	1877	1937 (aged 59–60)	(Ottoman Empire) Najaf, Ottoman Iraq	(Pahlavi Iran) Rey, Imperial State of Iran	-
4		Najm al-Hasan نجم الحسن	25 May 1863	18 April 1938 (aged 74)	(British Raj) British India	(British Raj) Lucknow, British India	-
5		Abdul Karim Kho'ini Zanjani عبدالکریم خوئینی زنجانی	1874	1938 (aged 63–64)	(Qajar Iran) Khoein, Sublime State of Persia	(Pahlavi Iran) Qazvin, Imperial State of Iran	-
6		Mirza Mahdi Ashtiani میرزا مهدی آشتیانی	1888	23 April 1953 (aged 64–65)	(Qajar Iran) Tehran, Sublime State of Persia	(Pahlavi Iran) Qom, Imperial State of Iran	-
7		Syed Ahmed Rizvi Kashmiri سید احمد رضوی کشمیری	1898	9 July 1964 (aged 65–66)	(British Raj) Srinagar, British India	Srinagar, India	
8		Abdulkarim Zanjani عبدالکریم زنجانی	1888	1968 (aged 79–80)	(Qajar Iran) Zanjan, Sublime State of Persia	(Pahlavi Iran) Imperial State of Iran	-
9		Seyed Sultan al-Wa'izin Shirazi سید سلطان الواعظین شیرازی	12 May 1894	11 October 1971 (aged 77)	(Qajar Iran) Tehran, Sublime State of Persia	(Pahlavi Iran) Tehran, Imperial State of Iran	-
10		Muhammad Taqi Amoli محمدتقی آملی	1887	1971 (aged 83–84)	(Qajar Iran) Tehran, Sublime State of Persia	(Pahlavi Iran) Mashhad, Imperial State of Iran	-
11		Haj Mohammad Ali Hakim Movahed Namazi Shirazi حاج محمد علی حکیم موحد نمازی شیرازی	1903	1971 (aged 67–68) (went missing)	(Qajar Iran) Shiraz, Sublime State of Persia	(Pahlavi Iran) Imperial State of Iran	-
12		Mirza Mahdi Elahi Ghomshei میرزا مهدی الهی قمشه ای	1 January 1901	15 May 1973 (aged 72)	(Qajar Iran) Isfahan, Sublime State of Persia	(Pahlavi Iran) Qom, Imperial State of Iran	-
13		Haj Mirza Mahdi Pooya Yazdi حاج میرزا مهدی پویا یزدی	1899	July 17, 1973 (aged 73–74)	(Ottoman Empire) Najaf, Ottoman Iraq	Karachi, Pakistan	
14		Mirza Ahmad Ashtiani میرزا احمد آشتیانی	1882	24 June 1975 (aged 92–93)	(Qajar Iran) Tehran, Sublime State of Persia	(Pahlavi Iran) Tehran, Imperial State of Iran	-
15		al-Sayyid Musa Sadr al-Din al-Sadr السيد موسى صدر الدين الصدر	4 June 1928	31 August 1978 (aged 50) (Went Missing)	(Pahlavi Iran) Qom, Imperial State of Iran	(History of Libya under Muammar Gaddafi) Libya	-
16		Ayatollah Seyyed Aboutaleb Pishvai ایت الله سید ابو طالب پیشوایی	1896	21 October 1978 (aged 81–82)	(Qajar Iran) Bandar-e Anzali, Sublime State of Persia	(Pahlavi Iran) Bandar-e Anzali, Imperial State of Iran	
17		Mahmoud Taleghani محمود طالقانی	5 March 1911	9 September 1979 (aged 68)	(Qajar Iran) Geliyard, Sublime State of Persia	Tehran, Iran	
18		Seyed Mohammad-Ali Qazi Tabatabaei سید محمدعلی قاضی طباطبایی	23 October 1914	2 November 1979 (aged 65)	(Qajar Iran) Tabriz, Sublime State of Persia	Tabriz, Iran	-
19		al-Sayyid Hassan al-Hussayni al-Shirazi السيد حسن الحسيني الشيرازي	1935	2 May 1980 (aged 44–45)	Najaf, Kingdom of Iraq	Beirut, Lebanon	-
20		Gholam Hossein Tabrizi غلامحسین تبریزی	1924	14 June 1980 (aged 55–56)	(Qajar Iran) Vayqan, Sublime State of Persia	Mashhad, Iran	-
21		Seyyed Mohammad Hossein Beheshti سیّد محمد حسینی بهشتی	24 October 1928	28 June 1981 (aged 52)	(Pahlavi Iran) Isfahan, Imperial State of Iran	Tehran, Iran	
22		Ali Qoddusi علی قدوسی	4 August 1927	5 September 1981 (aged 54)	(Pahlavi Iran) Nahavand, Imperial State of Iran	Tehran, Iran	-
23		Mohammad Sadoughi محمد صدوقی	1 March 1909	2 July 1982 (aged 73)	(Qajar Iran) Yazd, Sublime State of Persia	Yazd, Iran	-
24		Syed Yusuf al-Moosavi al-Safavi سید یوسف الموسوی الصفوی	1904	29 August 1982 (aged 77–78)	(British Raj) Budgam, British India	Budgam, India	-
25		Ata'ollah Ashrafi Esfahani عطاءالله اشرفی اصفهانی	1902	15 October 1982 (aged 79–80)	(Qajar Iran) Khomeyn, Isfahan, Sublime State of Persia	Kermanshah, Iran	
26		Seyed Mohammad Ali Angaji سید محمدعلی انگجی	1897	5 June 1983 (aged 85–86)	(Qajar Iran) Tabriz, Sublime State of Persia	Tabriz, Iran	-
27		Seyedeh Nosrat Begum Amin سیده نصرت‌بیگم امین	1886	13 June 1983 (aged 96–97)	(Qajar Iran) Isfahan, Sublime State of Iran	Qom, Iran	-
28		Jafar Hussain جعفر حسین	1914	29 August 1983 (aged 68–69)	(British Raj) British India	Gujranwala, Pakistan	-
29		Haj Mirza Khalil Kamarah'i حاج میرزا خلیل کمره	1898	11 October 1984 (aged 85–86)	(Qajar Iran) Sublime State of Persia	Tehran, Iran	
30		Mohammad Reza Tabasi محمد رضا طبسی	1899	18 January 1985 (aged 85–86)	(Qajar Iran) Mashhad, Sublime State of Iran	Qom, Iran	-
31		Morteza Haeri Yazdi مرتضی حائری یزدی	12 October 1916	16 March 1986 (aged 69)	(Qajar Iran) Arak, Sublime State of Persia	Qom, Iran	-
32		Seyyed Javad Khamenei سید جواد خامنه‌ای	7 December 1895	5 July 1986 (aged 90)	(Qajar Iran) Khameneh, Sublime State of Persia	Mashhad, Iran	-
33		Abdul Rahman Heidari Ilami عبدالرحمن حیدری ایلامی	1925	1 January 1987 (aged 61–62)	(Pahlavi Iran) Ilam, Imperial State of Iran	Qom, Iran	
34		Ruhollah Khatami روح الله خاتمی	28 October 1906	27 October 1988 (aged 81)	(Qajar Iran) Yazd, Sublime State of Persia	Yazd, Iran	
35		Ayatollah Sayyed Abbas Almohri آية الله سيد عباس المهري	1915	15 February 1988 (aged 72–73)	(Qajar Iran) Mohr, Sublime State of Persia	Tehran, Iran	-
36		Hasan Ali Nejabat Shirazi حسنعلی نجابت شیرازی	1917	28 April 1989 (aged 71–72)	(Qajar Iran) Shiraz, Sublime State of Persia	Shiraz, Iran	-
37		Hossein Lankarani حسین لنکرانی	1895	8 June 1989 (aged 93–94)	(Qajar Iran) Tehran, Sublime State of Persia	Tehran, Iran	-
38		Muhammad Yar Shah محمد یار شاه	1913	20 December 1990 (aged 76–77)	(British Raj) Alipur, British India	Lahore, Pakistan	-
39		Hussain Bakhsh Jarra حسین بخش جاڑا	1919	1990 (aged 70–71)	(British Raj) British India	Pakistan	-
40		Mohammed Kadhim al-Modarresi محمد كاظم حسينى مدرسى	1921	5 April 1994 (aged 72–73)	(Qajar Iran) Mashhad, Sublime State of Persia	Tehran, Iran	-
41		al-Sayyid Muhammad Kadhim al-Musawi al-Qazwini السيد محمد كاظم الموسوي القزويني	13 March 1930	17 November 1994 (aged 64)	(Kingdom of Iraq) Karbala, Mandatory Iraq	Qom, Iran	-
42		Mahmoud Ansari Qomi محمود انصاری قمی	1921	12 March 1999 (aged 77–78)	(Qajar Iran) Qom, Sublime State of Persia	Qom, Iran	-
43		Seyed Mohammad Jafar Moravej سید محمد جعفر مروج	27 July 1902	13 March 1999 (aged 96)	(Qajar Iran) Shushtar, Sublime State of Persia	Qom, Iran	-
44		Mahdi Haeri Yazdi مهدی حائری یزدی	1923	8 July 1999 (aged 75–76)	(Qajar Iran) Qom, Sublime State of Persia	Tehran, Iran	-
45		Hadi Rohani حادی روحانی	3 March 1924	13 October 1999 (aged 75)	(Qajar Iran) Kalleh Bast, Sublime State of Persia	Babol, Iran	-
46		Seyed Mahdi Hosseini Rohani سید مهدی حسینی روحانی	15 July 1925	23 November 2000 (aged 65)	(Qajar Iran) Qom, Sublime State of Persia	Qom, Iran	-
47		Mohammad Mehdi Shamseddine محمد مهدي شمس الدين	1936	10 January 2001 (aged 64–65)	Najaf, Kingdom of Iraq	Beirut, Lebanon	-
48		Seyed Hossein Ayatollahi سید حسین آیت‌اللهی	1931	14 January 2001 (aged 69–70)	(Pahlavi Iran) Jahrom, Imperial State of Iran	Tehran, Iran	-
49		Khalil Boyukzadeh خلیل بیوک‌زاده	18 September 1930	16 April 2001 (aged 70)	(Pahlavi Iran) Ardabil, Imperial State of Iran	Ardabil, Iran	
50		Syed Mustafa al-Moosavi al-Safavi سید مصطفی الموسوی الصفوی	2 February 1918	21 August 2002 (aged 84)	(British Raj) Budgam, British India	Budgam, India	-
51		Seyed Esmaeil Mousavi Zanjani سیداسماعیل موسوی زنجانی	1928	18 December 2002 (aged 73–74)	(Pahlavi Iran) Pari, Imperial State of Iran	(Iran) Ardabil, Zanjan	-
52		Seyed Abolfazl Mousavi Tabrizi سید ابوالفضل موسوی تبریزی	1935	14 April 2003 (aged 67–68)	(Pahlavi Iran) Tabriz, Imperial State of Iran	Tabriz, Iran	-
53		al-Sayyid Muhammad Baqir al-Hakim السيد محمد باقر الحكيم	1939	29 August 2003 (aged 63–64)	Najaf, Kingdom of Iraq	Najaf, Iraq	-
54		Mohammed Sadegh Sadeghi Givi Khalkhali محمد صادق صادقی گیوی خلخالی	27 July 1926	26 November 2003 (aged 77)	(Pahlavi Iran) Givi, Imperial State of Iran	Tehran, Iran	-
55		Hasanali Morvarid حسنعلى مرواريد	1911	5 October 2004 (aged 92–93)	(Qajar Iran) Mashhad, Sublime State of Persia	Mashhad, Iran	-
56		Mohammad Va'ez Abaee-Khorasani محمد واعظ عبایی خراسانی	1940	13 October 2004 (aged 63–64)	(Pahlavi Iran) Mashhad, Imperial State of Iran	Tehran, Iran	-
57		Seyed Jalalodin Ashtiani سید جلال‌الدین آشتیانی	1925	23 March 2005 (aged 79–80)	(Qajar Iran) Ashtian, Sublime State of Persia	Mashhad, Iran	-
58		Nematollah Salehi Najafabadi نعمت‌الله صالحی نجف‌آبادی	1923	6 May 2006 (aged 82–83)	(Qajar Iran) Najafabad, Sublime State of Persia	Tehran, Iran	-
59		Mohammad-Hadi Ma'refat محمدهادی معرفت	1931	19 January 2007 (aged 75–76)	(Kingdom of Iraq) Karbala, Mandatory Iraq	Qom, Iran	-
60		Abdul Karim Haghshenas عبدالکریم حق‌شناس	1919	24 July 2007 (aged 87–88)	(Qajar Iran) Tehran, Sublime State of Persia	Tehran, Iran	-
61		Ali Akbar Feyz Aleni علی‌اکبر فیض آلنی	2 December 1921	30 July 2007 (aged 85)	(Qajar Iran) Meshgin, Sublime State of Persia	Tehran, Iran	-
62		al-Sayyid Murtadha Sharif al-Askari السيد مرتضى العسكري	14 May 1914	16 September 2007 (aged 93)	(Ottoman Empire) Samarra, Ottoman Iraq	Tehran, Iran	-
63		Ahmad Mojtahedi Tehrani احمد مجتهدی تهرانی	2 October 1923	13 January 2008 (aged 84)	(Qajar Iran) Tehran, Sublime State of Persia	Tehran, Iran	-
64		Mohammad-Reza Tavassoli محمدرضا توسلی	1931	16 February 2008 (aged 76–77)	(Pahlavi Iran) Imperial State of Iran	Tehran, Iran	
65		al-Sayyid Muhammad Ridha al-Hussayni al-Shirazi السيد محمد رضا الحسيني الشيرازي	1959	1 June 2008 (aged 48–49)	(Ba'athist Iraq) Karbala, Iraqi Republic (1958–1968)	Qom, Iran	-
66		al-Sayyid Muhammad Ali al-Hakim السيد محمد علي الحكيم	1911	27 February 2011 (aged 99–100)	(Ottoman Empire) Najaf, Ottoman Iraq	Najaf, Iraq	-
67		Abbas-Ali Amid Zanjani عباسعلی عمید زنجانی	30 March 1937	30 October 2011 (aged 74)	(Pahlavi Iran) Zanjan, Imperial State of Iran	Tehran, Iran	-
68		Mohammed Taqi Morvarid محمد تقى مرواريد	1921	22 October 2012 (aged 90–91)	(Qajar Iran) Mashhad, Sublime State of Persia	Ilam, Iran	-
69		Seyed Karamatollah Malek Hosseini سید کرامت‌الله ملک‌حسینی	1924	2 November 2012 (aged 87–88)	(Qajar Iran) Gusheh-ye Shahzadeh Qasem, Sublime State of Persia	Yasuj, Iran	-
70		Azizollah Khoshvaght عزیزالله خوشوقت	1926	19 February 2013 (aged 86–87)	(Pahlavi Iran) Tehran, Imperial State of Iran	Mecca, Saudi Arabia	-
71		Seyed Mojtaba Mosavi Lari سید مجتبی موسوی لاری	1925	9 March 2013 (aged 87–88)	(Pahlavi Iran) Lar, Imperial State of Iran	Iran	-
72		Abd al-Hadi al-Fadli عبد الهادي الفضلي	6 December 1935	8 April 2013 (aged 77)	Basra, Kingdom of Iraq	Qatif, Saudi Arabia	-
73		Gholamreza Rezvani غلامرضا رضوانی	24 September 1922	19 April 2013 (aged 90)	(Qajar Iran) Sublime State of Persia	Iran	-
74		Seyyed Jalaleddin Taheri Esfahani سید جلال‌الدین طاهری اصفهانی	1 January 1926	2 June 2013 (aged 87)	(Pahlavi Iran) Isfahan, Imperial State of Iran	Isfahan, Iran	
75		Mohammad Mohammadi Gilani محمد محمدی گیلانی	31 August 1928	9 July 2014 (aged 85)	(Pahlavi Iran) Imperial State of Iran	Iran	-
76		Mohammad-Reza Mahdavi Kani محمدرضا مهدوی کنی	6 August 1931	21 October 2014 (aged 83)	(Pahlavi Iran) Kan District, Tehran, Imperial State of Iran	Tehran, Iran	
77		al-Sayyid Muhammad Baqir al-Musawi al-Muhri السيد محمد باقر الموسوي المهري	25 December 1948	4 July 2015 (aged 66)	Kuwait City, Kuwait	Jabriya, Kuwait	-
78		Abolghasem Khazali Boroujerdi ابوالقاسم خزعلی بروجردی	21 March 1925	16 September 2015 (aged 90)	(Pahlavi Iran) Borujerd, Imperial State of Iran	Tehran, Iran	-
79		Nimr Baqir al-Nimr نمر باقر النمر	21 June 1959	2 January 2016 (aged 56)	Al-Awamiyah, Saudi Arabia	Riyadh, Saudi Arabia	-
80		Abbas Vaez-Tabasi عباس واعظ طبسی	25 June 1935	4 March 2016 (aged 80)	(Pahlavi Iran) Tabas, Imperial State of Iran	Mashhad, Iran	
81		Akbar Hashemi Rafsanjani اکبر هاشمی رفسنجانی	25 August 1934	8 January 2017 (aged 82)	(Pahlavi Iran) Bahreman, Imperial State of Iran	Tehran, Iran	
82		Nasrallah Shah Abadi نصرالله شاه آبادی	24 September 1930	12 March 2018 (aged 87)	(Pahlavi Iran) Qom, Imperial State of Iran	Tehran, Iran	-
83		Asadollah Imani اسد‌الله ایمانی	1947	6 May 2018 (aged 70–71)	(Pahlavi Iran) Kazerun, Imperial State of Iran	Shiraz, Iran	
84		Gholamreza Hassani غلامرضا حسنی	21 July 1927	21 May 2018 (aged 90)	(Pahlavi Iran) Urmia, Imperial State of Iran	Urmia, Iran	
85		Sayyid Mahmoud Hashemi Shahroudi سید محمود هاشمی شاهرودی	15 August 1948	24 December 2018 (aged 70)	Najaf, Kingdom of Iraq	Tehran, Iran	
86		Mir Ebrahim Seyyed Hatami میرابراهیم سیدحاتمی	1924	6 January 2019 (aged 94–95)	(Qajar Iran) Ardabil, Sublime State of Persia	Qom, Iran	
87		Mohammad Momen محمد مؤمن	13 January 1938	21 February 2019 (aged 81)	(Pahlavi Iran) Qom, Imperial State of Iran	Tehran, Iran	
88		Seyyed Hadi Khosroshahi سید هادی خسروشاهی	1939	27 February 2020 (aged 80–81)	(Pahlavi Iran) Tabriz, Imperial State of Iran	Tehran, Iran	-
89		Reza Mohammadi Langroudi رضا محمدی لنگرودی	3 August 1928	5 March 2020 (aged 91)	(Pahlavi Iran) Langarud, Imperial State of Iran	Langarud, Iran	
90		Sayyid Hashem Bathaie Golpayegani سید هاشم بطحایی گلپایگانی	1941	16 March 2020 (aged 78–79)	(Pahlavi Iran) Guged, Imperial State of Iran	Qom, Iran	
91		Ebrahim Amini ابراهیم امینی	30 June 1925	24 April 2020 (aged 94)	(Pahlavi Iran) Najafabad, Imperial State of Iran	Qom, Iran	
92		Mohammad-Ali Taskhiri محمد علی تسخیر	19 October 1944	18 August 2020 (aged 75)	Najaf, Kingdom of Iraq	Tehran, Iran	-
93		Abdol Javad Alamolhoda سید عبدالجواد علم الهدی	1930	20 August 2020 (aged 89–90)	(Pahlavi Iran) Mashhad, Imperial State of Iran	Mashhad, Iran	
94		Mohammad Yazdi محمد یزدی	2 July 1931	9 December 2020 (aged 89)	(Pahlavi Iran) Isfahan, Imperial State of Iran	Qom, Iran	
95		Mohammad-Taqi Mesbah-Yazdi محمدتقی مصباح‌ یزدی	31 January 1935	1 January 2021 (aged 85)	(Pahlavi Iran) Yazd, Imperial State of Iran	Tehran, Iran	
96		Seyyed Mohammad Ziaabadi سید محمد ضیاءآبادی	1928	8 February 2021 (aged 92–93)	(Pahlavi Iran) Ziaabad, Imperial State of Iran	Tehran, Iran	
97		Fakhreddin Mousavi Naneh Karani فخرالدین موسوی ننه‌کرانی	1930	18 September 2021 (aged 90–91)	(Pahlavi Iran) Ardabil, Imperial State of Iran	Ardabil, Iran	
98		Hassan Hassanzadeh Amoli حسن حسن‌زاده آملی	February 10, 1929	25 September 2021 (aged 92)	(Pahlavi Iran) Larijan, Imperial State of Iran	Amol, Iran	
99		Mohsen Mojtahed Shabestari محسن مجتهد شبستری	1937	17 November 2021 (aged 83–84)	(Pahlavi Iran) Shabestar, Imperial State of Iran	Tehran, Iran	-
100		al-Sayyid Razi al-Hussayni al-Shirazi السيد رضي الحسيني الشيرازي	29 March 1927	1 December 2021 (aged 94)	(Kingdom of Iraq) Najaf, Mandatory Iraq	Tehran, Iran	-
101		Mohammad Reyshahri محمد ری‌‌شهری	29 October 1946	21 March 2022 (aged 75)	(Pahlavi Iran) Rey, Iran	Tehran, Iran	-
102		Seyed Mohammad Faghie سید محمد فقیه	10 April 1942	22 March 2022 (aged 79)	(Pahlavi Iran) Neyriz, Imperial State of Iran	Shiraz, Iran	-
103		Mohammad Feyz Sarabi محمد فیض سرابی	23 August 1928	11 April 2022 (aged 93)	(Pahlavi Iran) Sarab, Iran	Iran	-
104		Seyyed Abdollah Fateminia سید عبدالله فاطمی‌نیا	14 August 1946	16 May 2022 (aged 75)	(Pahlavi Iran) Tabriz, Iran	Iran	-
105		Mohammad Ali Naseri محمدعلی ناصری	25 November 1930	26 August 2022 (aged 91)	(Pahlavi Iran) Dolat Abad, Iran	Isfahan, Iran	
106		Ali Moradkhani Arangeh علی مرادخانی ارنگه	22 April 1926	19 October 2022 (aged 96)	(Pahlavi Iran) Tehran, Iran	Iran	
107		Abbas Ali Akhtari عباسعلی اختری	7 December 1939	31 October 2022 (aged 82)	(Pahlavi Iran) Sorkheh, Iran	Iran	
108		Abbas Ali Soleimani عباسعلی سلیمانی	25 May 1947	26 April 2023 (aged 75)	(Pahlavi Iran) Mazandaran, Iran	Iran	
109		Ali Orumian علی ارومیان	1932	23 January 2024 (aged 92)	(Pahlavi Iran) Maragheh, Iran	Iran	
110		Abdolnabi Namazi عبدالنبی نمازی	1948	28 January 2024 (aged 75–76)	(Pahlavi Iran) Dashti, Bushehr, Iran	Iran	
111		Mohammed Emami-Kashani محمد امامی کاشانی	3 October 1931	2 March 2024 (aged 92)	(Pahlavi Iran) Kashan, Iran	Iran	
112		Ali al-Kourani علي الكوراني	22 November 1944	19 May 2024 (aged 79)	Yater, Lebanon	Qom, Iran	
113		Seyed Ebrahim Raisol-Sadati سید ابراهیم رئیس‌الساداتی	14 December 1960	19 May 2024 (aged 63)	(Pahlavi Iran) Mashhad, Iran	Iran	The then President of Iran died in a helicopter crash
114		Seyed Mohammad Ali Ale-Hashem سید محمدعلی آل‌هاشم	1962	19 May 2024 (aged 61–62)	(Pahlavi Iran) Tabriz, Iran	Iran	Was alongside Raisi in the helicopter crash
115		Hassan Raza Ghadeeri حسن رضا غدیری	14 August 1952	21 August 2024 (aged 72)	Lahore, Pakistan	London, United Kingdom	
116		al-Sayyid Fadhil al-Hussayni al-Milani السيد فاضل الحسيني الميلاني	30 May 1944	2 September 2024 (aged 80)	(Kingdom of Iraq) Karbala, Iraq	London, United Kingdom	-
117		al-Sayyid Mohammad Ali al-Shirazi السيد محمد علی الشيرازي	1947	19 December 2024 (aged 76–77)	(Kingdom of Iraq) Najaf, Iraq	Iraq	-
118		Seyed Mohammad Shahcheraghi سید محمد شاهچراغی	10 June 1934	13 December 2025 (aged 91)	(Pahlavi Iran) Damghan, Iran	Semnan, Iran	-
119		Mohammad-Hadi Abdekhodaei شیخ محمدهادی عبدخدایی	28 July 1938	30 January 2026 (aged 87)	(Pahlavi Iran) Mashhad, Iran	Mashhad, Iran	-
120		Zaynolabideen Ghorbani العابدین قربانی	8 January 1933	12 October 2026 (aged 93)	(Pahlavi Iran) Panchah, Iran	Iran	

- India Syed Hamid Hussain Musavi Kintoori Lakhnavi Hindi Neshapuri (1830-1888) author of the book, Abaqat ul Anwar fi Imamat al Ai'imma al-Athar.
- India Al-Allamah, Al-Faqeeh, Al-Adeeb Ayatollah Shaikh Ali Hazeen Lahiji (17th century)
- India Ayatollah Aga Syed Mehdi Kashmiri (d.1892)
- India Ayat-ul-Ilm-e-wat-Tuqa Ayatullah Syed Imdad Ali – First Ameed Jamia-e-Imania, Banaras
- India Jawad-ul-Ulama Ayatollah Syed Ali Jawad Al-Husaini Zangipuri, Zangipur/Banaras (1857-1920) – Mu‘aasir wa Ham-Jama‘at Sahib-e-Abaqaat wa Jadd-e-A‘laa-ye Naqeeb-ul-Millat Ayatollah Syed Hasan Imam.
- India Munaitiq-e-Zaman Ayatullah Syed Mohammad Sajjad Al-Husaini – Founder Jamia Jawadia, Banaras (1928), Farzand e Ayatollah Syed Ali Jawad Zangipuri wa Jadd-e-A‘laa-ye Naqeeb-ul-Millat Ayatollah Syed Hasan Imam.
- India Qudwat-ul-Fuqaha Ayatullah Syed Sibte Husain, Jaunpur
- India Ayatollah Syed Ali Shah Rizvi Kashmiri
- India Alam-ul-Aalaam Ayatullah Syed Muzaffar Husain Al-Husaini – First Haadi (Supreme Authority) Jamia Jawadia, Banaras (d.1944)
- India Ayatollah Syed Mohammad Abul Hasan Rizvi Kashmiri – Founder of Sultanul Madaris son of Ayatollah Syed Ali Shah Rizvi Kashmiri
- India Ayatollah Syed Mohammad Mosawi Ichgami Kashmiri (1910 - 1959)
- Saudi Arabia Ayatollah Sheikh Muhammad Ali al-Amri
- India Fakhr Ul Islam Alhaj Allama Syed Taqi Hasan Naqvi Wafa Sahab Qibla known as Raees Ul Fuqaha (1921-1998) President of Idara E Jaferia, Principal of Madarsa and Hawza Ilmia Jaferia (Qadeem) and founder of Jaferia Technical Institute

== See also ==
- List of current maraji
- List of deceased maraji
- List of hujjatul Islams
