= Mohammad-Hadi Abdekhodaei =

Iranian ayatollah (1938–2026)

Ayatollah Sheikh Mohammad-Hadi Abdekhodaei
- آیت الله شیخ محمدهادی عبدخدایی
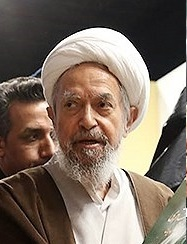
- Abdekhodaei in 2019

Member of the first term of the Islamic Consultative Assembly
- In office 28 May 1980 – 27 May 1984
- Constituency: Razavi Khorasan Province

Member of the second term of the Islamic Consultative Assembly
- In office 28 May 1984 – 27 May 1988
- Constituency: Razavi Khorasan Province
- Majority: 340,293 (44.2%)

Member of the fourth term of the Islamic Consultative Assembly
- In office 28 May 1992 – 26 May 1996
- Constituency: Razavi Khorasan Province
- Majority: 340,293 (44.2%)

The 11th Amabassador to the Holy See
- In office 05 May 1997 – 22 January 2001
- President: Akbar Hashemi Rafsanjani; Mohammad Khatami
- Preceded by: Mohammad Masjed Jamei
- Succeeded by: Mostafa Boroujerdi

Member of the Fifth term of Assembly of Experts
- In office 24 May 2016 – 21 May 2024
- Preceded by: Ali Asghar Masoumi Shahroudi
- Constituency: Razavi Khorasan Province
- Majority: 873,143 (31.4%)
- محمدهادی عبدخدایی; Mohammad-Hadi Abdekhodaei
- Title: Ayatollah

Personal life
- Born: 28 July 1938 Mashhad, Imperial State of Iran
- Died: 30 January 2026 (aged 87) Mashhad, Iran
- Parent: Gholam Hossein Tabrizi (father)
- Political party: Fada'iyan-e Islam
- Education: Qom Hawza; University of Tehran; Khorasan Seminary
- Relatives: Mohammad-Mehdi Abdekhodaei (brother)

Religious life
- Religion: Islam
- Jurisprudence: Twelver Shia Islam

Sheikh Mohammad-Hadi Abdekhodaei (Persian: شیخ محمدهادی عبدخدایی; 28 July 1938 – 30 January 2026) was an Iranian ayatollah. He was a member of the Fifth term of the Assembly of Experts. He was previously the 11th Ambassador of Iran to the Vatican, and also served in the Iranian Parliament for three terms.

== Biography ==
Mohammad-Hadi Abdekhodaei was born on 28 July 1938 in Mashhad, Iran. He was born into a religious family, as his father Gholam Hossein Tabrizi was a well known Ayatollah. He attained Ijtihad in Qom Hawza, afterwards he obtained his doctorate from University of Tehran in Philosophy.

After the 1979 Iranian revolution, he was elected by the people of Razavi Khorasan to represent them in the Iranian Parliament. He was elected three separate times, the first term, second term, and the fourth term. He was also chosen to be the Ambassador of Iran to the Holy See, where he was awarded the Order of Merit and Virtue by Pope John Paul II. He was fluent in Persian, Arabic, English and Italian. He served as the representative of the people of Razavi Khorasan in the Assembly of Experts. He held that role from 2016 Iranian Assembly of Experts election until 2024.

Abdekhodaei died on 30 January 2026, at the age of 87.

== Works ==
- Foruq Haq in Nahj al-Balagha
- Political Piety in Nahj al-Balagha

== See also ==
- List of ayatollahs
- List of members in the Fifth Term of the Council of Experts
- Hadi Khosroshahi
