= Hasan Raza =

Hasan Raza may refer to:

- Hasan Raza (Sindh cricketer) (b. 1982), Pakistani international cricketer
- Raza Hasan (B. 1992), Pakistani international cricketer
- Hasan Raza (Khyber Pakhtunkhwa cricketer) (b. 1995), Pakistani first-class cricketer
- Hasan Rıza, Ottoman soldier
- Hasan Rıza Pasha, Ottoman general
- Hassan Raza Ghadeeri, Pakistani Ayatollah
- Hassan Raza (actor), Nepalese actor
- Hasan Reza Rural District
