= Al-Isra, 26 =

This is a sub-article to Al-Isra.

Qur'an 17:26 (also notated Al-Isra, 26) is the twenty-sixth verse of Al-Isra, the seventeenth chapter of the Qur'an, which relates to the controversies of the land of Fadak in modern-day Saudi Arabia.

The verse is also known as the Verse of Dhul Qurba

== Overview ==
Surah Al-Isra 17:26:

Give to close relatives their due, as well as the poor and ˹needy˺ travellers. And do not spend wastefully.

Transliteration: Waati tha alqurba haqqahuwalmiskeena wabna assabeeli walatubaththir tabtheera

Arabic: وَءَاتِ ذَا ٱلْقُرْبَىٰ حَقَّهُۥ وَٱلْمِسْكِينَ وَٱبْنَ ٱلسَّبِيلِ وَلَا تُبَذِّرْ تَبْذِيرًا

== Exegis ==
=== Sunni view ===
Suyuti, a 16th century Sunni Islamic scholar writes: A hadith attributed to Abu-Sa'id al-Khudri and `Abd Allah ibn `Abbas reports:

when the verse relating to giving rights to kindred was revealed, the Prophet called Fatimah and gifted the land of Fadak to her

This hadith is also included by:

- Kanz al-Ummal, v2, p158
- Lababul Naqool, p137, Sura Isra
- Tafsir al-Mazhari, in his exegesis of the verse
- Ruh al-Ma'ani

=== Shi'a view ===
Mahdi Puya, a 20th century Shi'a twelver Islamic scholar writes regarding this verse:

Refer to the commentary of Anfal: 41 and Nahl: 90.

A hadith attributed to Abu Hatim Ahmad ibn Hamdan al-Razi on the authority of Abu-Sa'id al-Khudri reports:

as soon as this verse was revealed, the Holy Prophet at once gave the garden of Fadak to his daughter, Fatimah.

Ibn Jarir reports that once Imam Ali bin Husayn al Zayn al Abidin said to a Syrian:

"We are the near of kin referred to in this verse."

Abd ibn Salih, a courtier, had reported that Abbasid Caliph Al-Ma'mun (r. 813–833) wrote a letter to Abdullah ibn Musa to know his opinion about the issue of Fadak. Ibn Musa quoted the above noted tradition. Then Mamun returned the land of Fadak to the children of Fatimah. The land the Jews left without an heir was distributed by the Muhammad, as commanded by God (see Anfal: 1), with the consent of the ansar English: helpers, among the muhajirin (English: émigrés who had abandoned their properties in Mecca. Many gardens and tracts of land, Fatimah inherited from her mother, Khadijah, were in and around Mecca. Through this verse God directed Muhammad to give Fatimah her due rights. So he gave her the garden of Fadak in fulfilment of her share as a muhajir and also included his own share in it. During the lifetime of Muhammad, the land of Fadak was in the active possession of Fatimah, but after Muhammad's death, the first caliph, Abu Bakr, seized the land. The evidence of Ali, his sons Hasan and Husayn and Fatimah was rejected, notwithstanding their truthfulness according to the Qur'an (Ali Imran: 61, Ahzab: 33). Her claim as the inheritor of Muhammad was also rejected. Sahih Muslim and Sahih Bukhari inform us that the caliph Umar used to point out Ali and Abbas as those who branded him and his predecessor as usurpers and liars in connection with the property of Fadak, and neither Ali nor Abbas ever denied it. Fatimah, after this incident, never spoke to Abu Bakr and Umar, and asked Ali not to allow them to attend her funeral prayers and burial. The confiscated property of Fadak was never used for the well-being of the people nor for the maintenance of the Muslim army.

Umayyid caliphs treated the garden of Fadak as his personal property, except Umar II, who, after making a thorough examination of the case, returned it to the ahl al-bayt (English: people of the house, i.e. Muhammad's family). The Abbasid caliphs again took it away from the ahl al-bayt and used it as their property, till Abbasid caliph al-Ma'mun again conducted a thorough inquiry by a special court of jurists before which a follower of the ahl al-bayt advocated their case and the state attorney opposed his arguments. At the end al-Ma'mun wrote the judgement in the form of a royal edict, awarding the land to the ahl al-bayt, a summary of which has been recorded by al-Baladhuri in his famous book Fath al-Buldan. Ibn Abi al-Hadid has also given a brief account of the arguments, for and against, in his commentary of the art of eloquence. Fatimah herself gave the strongest arguments in her favour in her address to the then-ruling party.
