= 1881 in Iran =

- Decades
- See also: Other events of 1881; Years in Iran

The following lists events that happened during 1881 in Qajar era.

== Incumbents ==
- Monarch: Naser al-Din Shah Qajar

== Births ==
- January 24 – André Godard, French archeologist and architect.
- April 28 – Mohammad Sa'ed, Prime Minister of Iran.
- ? – Abdolali Lotfi, Iranian politician.
- ? – Abdollah Amir-Tahmasebi, Iranian politician and general.
- ? – Hossein Dadgar, Iranian politician.
- ? – Mohammad Tadayyon, Iranian politician.
- ? – Syed Ali Damad, Iranian Ayatollah.

== Deaths ==
- ? – Aga Khan I, politician.
- ? – Hakob Hovnatanyan, Armenian artist.
