= Mohsen Faqihi =

Iranian scholar

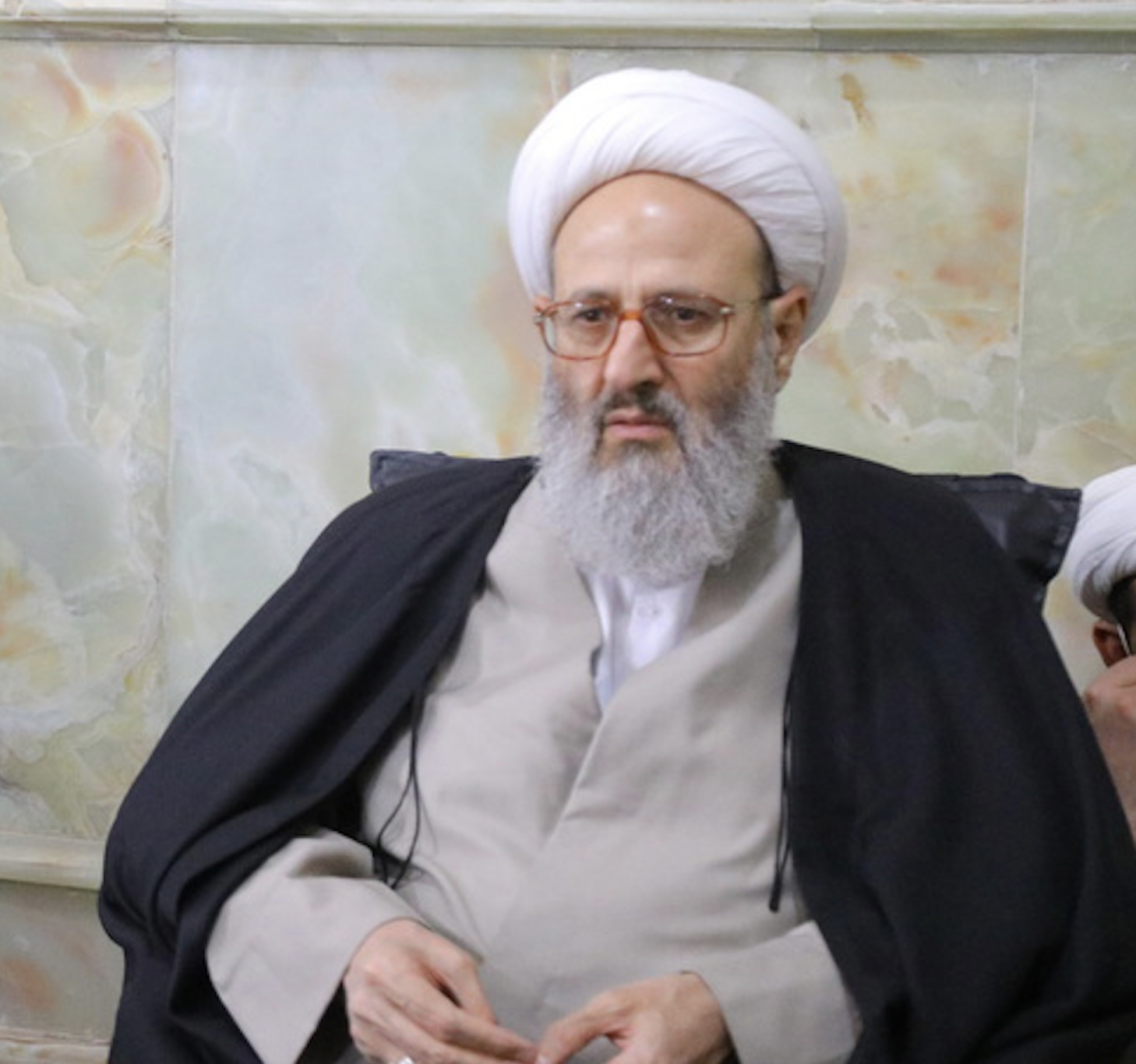
- Ayatollah Mohsen Faqihi attending a ceremony of the death anniversary of Safi Golpaygani, in Qom 2023.
- Born: 1952 (age 73–74)
- Website: mohsenfaghihi.com

Mohsen Faqihi (Persian: محسن فقیهی) (born 1952) is an Iranian Twelver Shi'a Ayatollah. He has studied in seminaries of Qum, Iran under Morteza Haeri Yazdi, Mohammad-Reza Golpaygani and Mohammad Ali Araki. Faqihi is known for his book Maʻrifat Abwāb al-Fiqh in which he summarized Tahrir al-Wasilah. He is a member of the Society of Seminary Teachers of Qom.

== See also ==
- List of ayatollahs
