= Mohammad Javad Pishvai =

Iranian cleric

Seyyed Mohammad Javad Pishvai (Persian:سید_محمد_جواد_پیشوایی; Bandar-e Anzali, b. 1944) is the religious leader of Bandar-e Anzali, appointed by a handwritten verdict of Ayatollah Khomeini 5 days after the establishment of the Islamic Republic. He was born a son of Ayatollah Seyyed Aboutaleb Pishvai, religious leader of Bandar-e Anzali from 1951 to 1978. In 1961 he was dressed in clerical garbs by Ayatollah Khomeini, who had come to pay a visit to his father Ayatollah Pishvai. From 1965 to 1975 he attended Hakim Religious School in Qom in order to receive a certificate granting him the right to represent religious institutions.

In 1981, Ayatollah Khomeini sent him, as the supreme's leader official representative, across the country on a religious mission to Sistan and Baluchestan Province, a place very unlike the Caspian harbor city Pishvai represented before.
