= Morteza Sadouqi Mazandarani =

Iranian Twelver Shi'a Ayatollah (born 1946)

Ayatollah Morteza Sadoughi Mazandarani
- Born: 22 July 1946 (age 80); Iran
- Website: Official Website

Ayatollah Morteza Sadoughi Mazandarani (Persian: مرتضی صدوقی مازندرانی) (born 22 July 1946) is an Iranian Twelver Shi'a cleric.

He has studied in seminaries of Qom, Iran under Grand Ayatollah Mohammad Ali Araki and Mohammad-Reza Golpaygani and in seminaries of Mashhad, Iran under Grand Ayatollah Hossein Vahid Khorasani.

On 26 December 2021, Mazandarani criticized the Iranian government, stating that: "What is ruling is not Islam. With this trend, things will only get worse and the road to hell will be paved."

== See also ==
- List of ayatollahs
