= Reza Mohammadi Langroudi =

Iranian cleric (1928–2020)

Reza Mohammadi
- Title: Ayatollah

Personal life
- Born: 3 August 1928 Langarud, Gilan Province, Imperial State of Persia
- Died: 5 March 2020 (aged 91) Langarud, Gilan Province, Iran
- Cause of death: COVID-19
- Era: Modern history
- Main interest: Usool Fiqh

Religious life
- Religion: Shia Islam
- Creed: Usuli Twelver Shia Islam

Senior posting
- Influenced by: Hossein Borujerdi, Ruhollah Khomeini, Mohammad-Taqi Bahjat Foumani

Reza Mohammadi (; 3 August 1928 – 5 March 2020) was an Iranian Twelver Shi'a cleric of the rank of Ayatollah. He served as representative of the Iranian Supreme Leader Ali Khamenei in the town of Langroud.

Reza Mohammadi was a student of Hossein Borujerdi, Ruhollah Khomeini and Mohammad-Taqi Bahjat Foumani.

During the 1979 Islamic Revolution, he played an influential role in the marches. For a time, he was the temporary Friday imam of Langroud and Amlash.

He died at the age of 91 as a result of coronavirus disease 2019 (COVID-19) on 5 March 2020.Persian: رضا محمدی

== See also ==
- List of ayatollahs
