= Abbas Ali Akhtari =

Iranian Ayatollah (1939–2022)

Ayatollah Sheikh Abbas Ali Akhtari
- آیت الله شیخ عباسعلی اختری
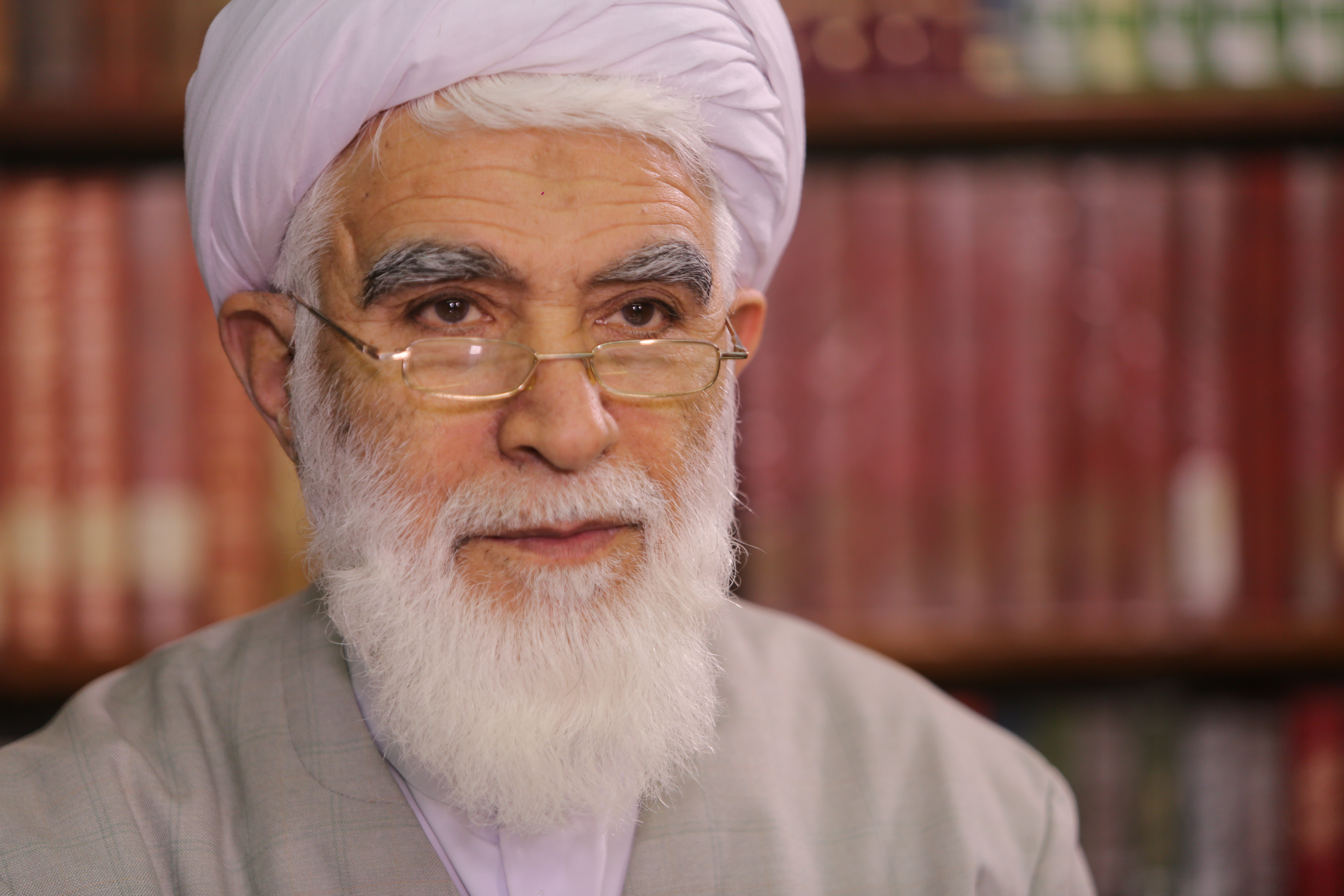
- Abbas Ali Akhtari in 2016

Representative of Supreme Leader
- In office 1981 – 11 January 2003
- Appointed by: Ruhollah Khomeini
- Preceded by: Office established
- Succeeded by: Seyed Mohammad Shahcheraghi
- Constituency: Semnan province

Friday Prayer Leader of Semnan
- In office 1981 – 11 January 2003
- Appointed by: Ruhollah Khomeini
- Preceded by: Office established
- Succeeded by: Seyed Mohammad Shahcheraghi

Member of First term of Islamic Consultative Assembly
- In office 28 May 1980 – 27 May 1984
- Constituency: Mashhad – Khorasan Province

Member of Seventh term of Islamic Consultative Assembly
- In office 27 May 2004 – 26 May 2008
- Constituency: Tehran province
- Majority: 1,971,557 (26.36%)

Member of the Fifth term of Assembly of Experts
- In office 22 February 2021 – 31 October 2022
- Preceded by: Nasrallah Shah-Abadi
- Constituency: Tehran province
- Majority: 961,773 (49.99%)
- عباسعلی اختری; Abbas Ali Akhtari
- Title: Ayatollah

Personal life
- Born: 7 December 1939 Sorkheh, Imperial State of Iran
- Died: 31 October 2022 (aged 82)
- Education: Qom Hawza

Religious life
- Religion: Islam
- Jurisprudence: Twelver Shia Islam

Sheikh Abbas Ali Akhtari (Persian: شیخ عباسعلی اختری; 7 December 1939 – 31 October 2022) was an Iranian Ayatollah. He represented the Supreme Leader of Iran in Semnan province, while also serving as the Imam of Friday Prayer in Semnan. He also represented the people in Khorasan province in the early 80's for the first term of the Islamic Consultative Assembly (Iranian Parliament). He later represented the people of Tehran province for the seventh term of the Iranian Parliament. He was a member of Assembly of Experts, from February 2021 to October 2022 in the fifth term of the Assembly of Experts, after the death of Nasrallah Shah-Abadi. He was elected in the first midterm elections of the Assembly of Experts on 23 February 2020.

== Biography ==
Abbas Ali Akhtari was born on 7 December 1939 in Sorkheh. After obtaining his diploma in school in his hometown, he went to Mashhad to attend the Hawza there. He stayed there for around 20 years, before leaving to Qom to attend advanced classes in Islamic studies in Qom Seminary, as well as teach there. He had been in trouble with SAVAK before the Iranian revolution, he was arrested for making anti-Shah speeches. He served the Iranian military service alongside Akbar Hashemi Rafsanjani. After the revolution, he was chosen by Ruhollah Khomeini to represent him in Semnan province, as well as leading the prayers in Semnan. He resigned from these posts in 2001, and Seyed Mohammad Shahcheraghi was chosen by Ali Khamenei to replace him. He served two terms in the Iranian Parliament. He was unsuccessful in the 2016 Iranian Assembly of Experts election, however, was elected in the midterm elections in 2020 replacing Nasrallah Shah-Abadi.

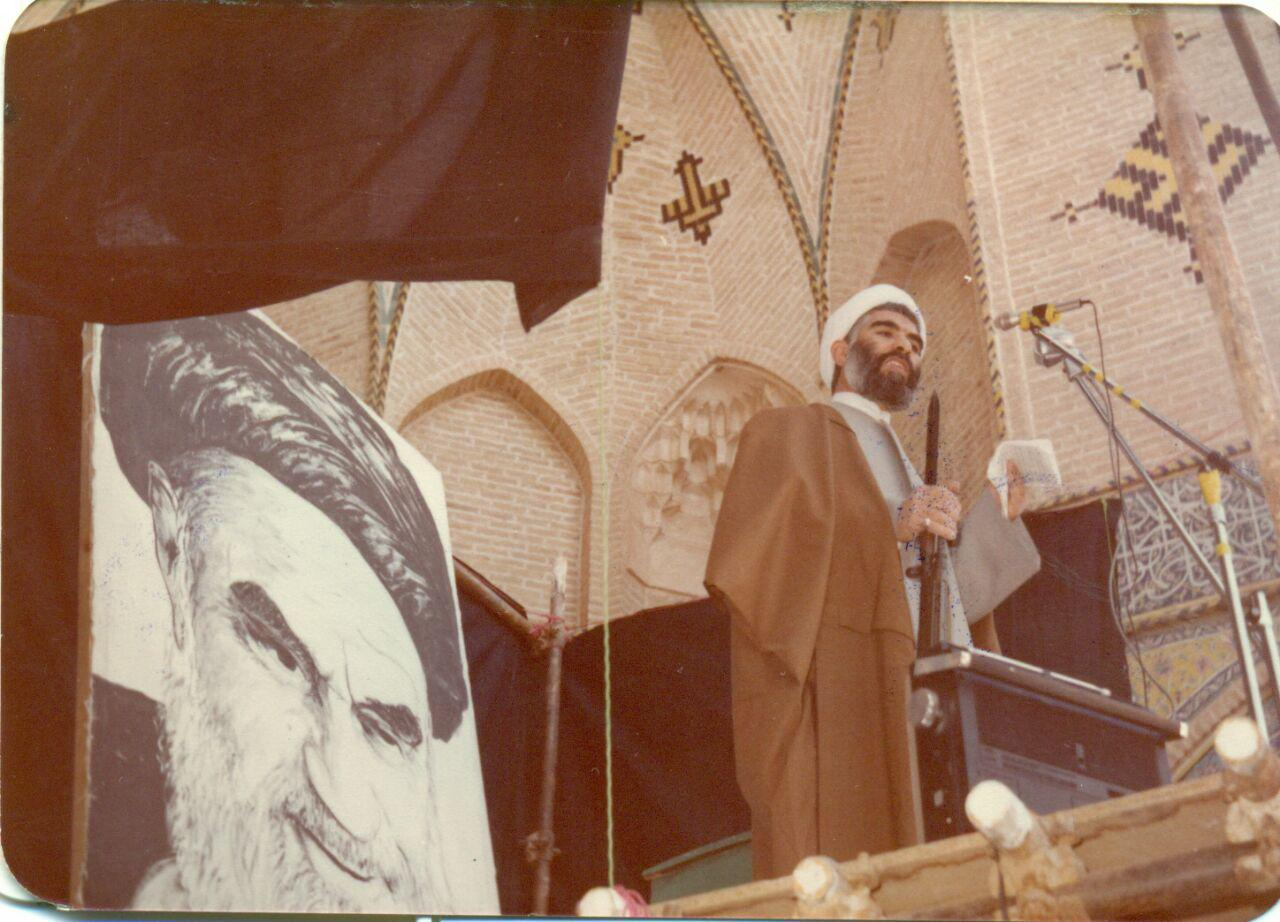
Abbas Ali Akhtari giving a sermon in his first Friday Prayer in Semnan, 1981.

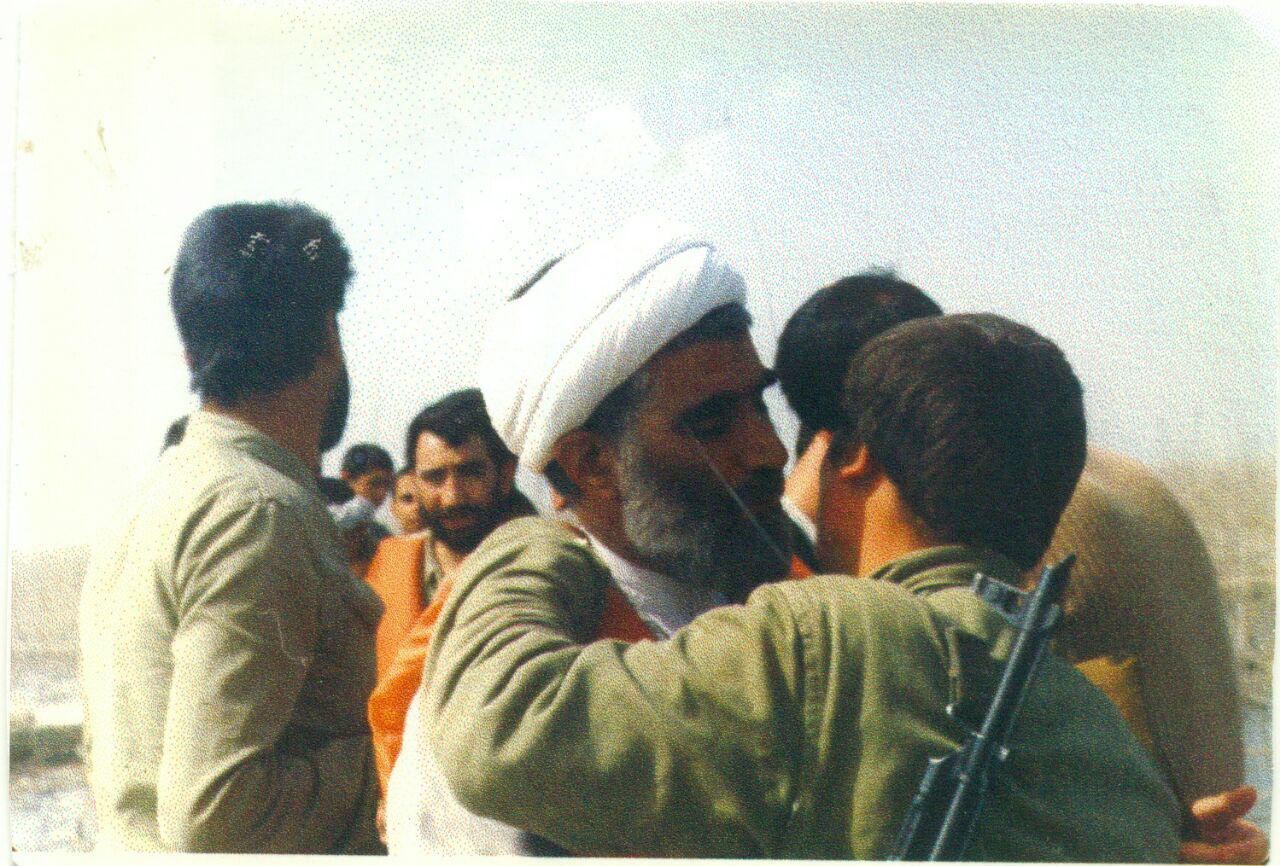
Abbas Ali Akhtari greeting soldiers near the frontline during the Iran–Iraq War.

== Works ==
Abbas Ali Akhtari has published several works throughout his life. Here are some of them.

- Familiarity with the Quran
- Toli and Tabari
- Young People at a Crossroads
- The Manifestations of Wisdom in the Words of the Infallibles (peace be upon them)
- Imams and Revival of the Values of the Islamic Revolution

== See also ==
- List of ayatollahs
- List of members in the Fifth Term of the Council of Experts
- List of provincial representatives appointed by Supreme Leader of Iran
- List of Iran's parliament representatives (7th term)
- Mohammad Shahcheraghi
