= Mohammad Shahcheraghi =

Iranian ayatollah (1934–2025)

Ayatollah Seyed Mohammad Shahcheraghi
- محمد شاهچراغی
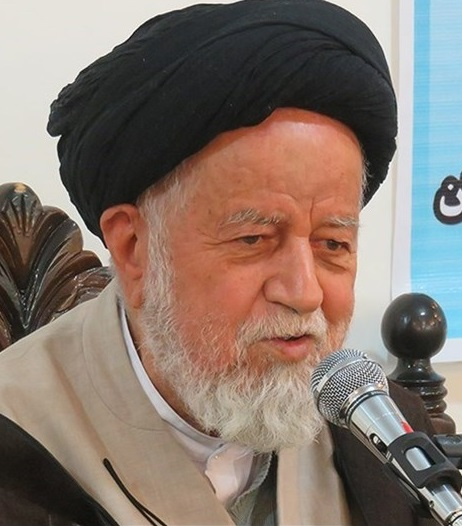
- Shahcheraghi in 2018

Representative of Supreme Leader in Semnan Province Imam of Friday Prayer of Semnan
- In office 11 January 2003 – 4 August 2021
- Appointed by: Ali Khamenei
- Preceded by: Abbas Ali Akhtari
- Succeeded by: Morteza Motei

Member of the Fourth and Fifth terms of Assembly of Experts
- In office 20 February 2007 – 21 May 2024
- Preceded by: Mohammad Ali Alemi
- Constituency: Semnan Province
- Majority: 224,215 (68.98%) (fifth)
- Majority: 165,485 (61.23%) (fourth)
- محمد شاهچراغی; Mohammad Shahcheraghi
- Title: Ayatollah

Personal life
- Born: 10 June 1934 Damghan, Persia
- Died: 13 December 2025 (aged 91) Semnan, Iran
- Parent: Seyed Hassan Shahcheraghi (father)
- Education: Qom Hawza
- Relatives: Seyed Taher Shahcheraghi (brother); Seyed Masih Shahcheraghi (brother)

Religious life
- Religion: Islam
- Jurisprudence: Twelver Shia Islam

Seyed Mohammad Shahcheraghi (Persian: سید محمد شاهچراغی; 10 June 1934 – 13 December 2025) was an Iranian ayatollah. He represented the Supreme Leader of Iran in Semnan province, as well being the Imam of Friday Prayer in Semnan. He was elected by the people of Semnan province to represent them in the Assembly of Experts for two terms. He was a member of the Assembly of Experts until May 2024.

== Early life and education ==
Mohammad Shahcheraghi was born on 10 June 1934 in Hasanabad, Damghan County to a religious family. His father, Seyed Hassan Shahcheraghi, was a cleric who gave prayers in their local village. After finishing school in his hometown, he entered the Islamic seminary in Damghan, where he was taught by Sheikh Mohammad Reza Khodaei. After six years there, he left for Qom to further his Islamic studies at Qom Seminary. It was here he attained Ijtihad, and reached the rank of Ayatollah.

== Teachers ==
Here are some of Shahcerhaghi's teachers during his time at seminaries.

- Sheikh Mohammad Reza Khodaei
- Sheikh Gholam Hossein Kheiri
- Haj Mirza Agha Alemi
- Mohammad-Reza Golpaygani
- Hossein Borujerdi
- Ruhollah Khomeini
- Morteza Haeri Yazdi
- Seyed Mohammad Mohaghegh Damad
- Muhammad Husayn Tabatabai

== Politics and views ==
After the resignation of Abbas Ali Akhtari in 2003, Ali Khamenei chose Shahcheraghi to replace him as the representative of the Supreme Leader of Iran in Semnan province. He was also the Imam of Friday Prayer in Semnan. He held those positions until 2021, when he resigned and was replaced by Morteza Motei by Ali Khamenei. He was elected by the people of Semnan province to represent them in the 2006 and 2016 elections for the Assembly of Experts. He retained that position until his death.

He spoke out about the water issues in Semnan, and urged the management to fulfil the needs and satisfaction of the people. He also urged the protestors during the 2021–2022 Iranian protests not to "fall into the trap of the enemies" i.e. the oppositions of the Iranian Government.

He also stated that having good hygiene and abiding by health and safety guidelines is an "Islamic Duty". He urged the people of Semnan to follow the health and safety precautions of COVID-19.

== Death ==
Shahcheraghi died in Semnan, Iran on 13 December 2025, at the age of 91.

== See also ==
- List of ayatollahs
- List of members in the Fifth Term of the Council of Experts
- List of members in the Fourth Term of the Council of Experts
- List of provincial representatives appointed by Supreme Leader of Iran
- COVID-19 pandemic in Iran
- Abbas Ali Akhtari
