= Ali Akbar Masoudi Khomeini =

Iranian Ayatollah

Ayatollah Sheikh Ali Akbar Masoudi Khomeini
- آیت الله شیخ علی‌اکبر مسعودی خمینی
- Ayatollah Ali Akbar Masoudi Khomeini (c. 2010-2015)

Trustee of Fatima Masumeh Shrine
- In office 19 July 1992 – 9 December 2010
- Appointed by: Ali Khamenei
- Preceded by: Ahmad Molaei
- Succeeded by: Seyyed Mohammad Saeedi
- علی‌اکبر مسعودی خمینی
- Title: Ayatollah

Personal life
- Born: 1932 (age 93–94) Khomeyn, Imperial State of Iran
- Parent: Gholam Ali Masoudi (father)
- Political party: Society of Seminary Teachers of Qom
- Education: Qom Hawza; Hawza Najaf

Religious life
- Religion: Islam
- Jurisprudence: Twelver Shia Islam

Muslim leader
- Teacher: Hossein Borujerdi; Ruhollah Khomeini; Mohammad-Taqi Bahjat Foumani

Sheikh Ali Akbar Masoudi Khomeini (Persian: شیخ علی‌اکبر مسعودی خمینی, born 1932) is an Iranian ayatollah. He is a member of the Society of Seminary Teachers of Qom, as well as serving as the Trustee for Fatima Masumeh Shrine.

== Early life and education ==
Ali Akbar Masoudi was born in 1932 in Khomeyn. He was born into a middle-class family, his father, Gholam Ali Masoudi was a pastry chef. He began his education by attending the same primary school as Ruhollah Khomeini in Khomeyn. When he was 15 he left to Arak to pursue his Islamic studies. There he was taught by several scholars such as Mollah Abdollah and others. He stayed in the seminary in Arak for 2–3 years before leaving to Qom to further his Islamic studies in the Qom Seminary. There he was taught by esteemed Shia scholars such as Mohammad-Reza Golpaygani, Hossein Borujerdi and others. He also spent 4 years in Najaf, attending the Hawza Najaf.

== Teachers ==
During his time studying Islam, Ali Akbar had several esteemed teachers. Here are some of them.

- Mohammad-Taqi Bahjat Foumani
- Ruhollah Khomeini
- Hossein Borujerdi
- Mohammad-Reza Golpaygani
- Mollah Abdullah
- Sheikh Ahmad al-Tahir
- Musa al-Sadr
- Seyed Reza al-Sadr
- Seyed Ali Arakiyeh

== Views and responsibilities ==
After the 1979 Iranian revolution, Ali Akbar was elected by Ali Khamenei to replace Ahmad Molaei in 1992, as the Trustee of Fatima Masumeh Shrine. Seyyed Mohammad Saeedi was chosen to replace him in 2010.

He has spoken against Mohammad Yazdi after he sent a letter criticising Mousa Shubairi Zanjani. He believes that Mohammad Yazdi had no right to attack the scholar, when he is "not even close" to his level, and found his letter insulting. He has also criticised Kazem Seddiqi after giving a sermon (Khutbah) regarding the death of Mohammad-Taqi Mesbah-Yazdi.

He advised Mahmoud Ahmadinejad to "stay home and seek the way of God in the remaining years of his life". He criticised Mahmoud's second term of presidency and claimed "In the second term of his presidency, he took several actions that made some people resent and even hate him".

He claims that in the later years of Ahmad Azari Qomi's life, he wrote a letter of apology to Ali Khamenei after their falling out. He went on to say "those who reject such a letter, reject my existence". He presented the letter to Ali Khamenei.

He has also criticised the words of some members in the Guardian Council, as well as some of its functions with seminaries in Qom. He believes seminaries in Qom should abstain from politics.

== See also ==
- List of ayatollahs
- Zaynolabideen Ghorbani
- Seyyed Mohammad Ziaabadi
