= Khalil Boyukzadeh =

Iranian Ayatollah (1930-2001)

- خلیل بیوک‌زاده
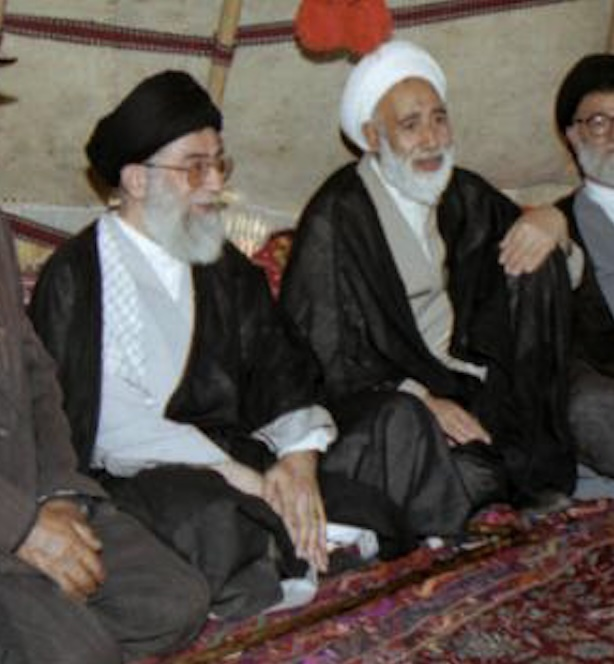
- Khalil Boyukzadeh next to Ali Khamenei on his trip to Ardabil, 2000.

Member of Assembly of Experts
- In office 1982 – 16 April 2001 (died, replaced by Mir Ebrahim Seyyed Hatami to 2006)

Representative of the Supreme Leader in Ardabil Province and Imam Jumu'ah of Ardabil
- In office 1979 – 16 April 2001
- Appointed by: Ruhollah Khomeini
- Preceded by: Office Created
- Succeeded by: Hassan Ameli

Personal details
- Born: 18 September 1930 Ardabil, Iran
- Died: 16 April 2001 (aged 70) Ardabil, Iran
- Education: Qom Hawza

Ayatollah Khalil Boyukzadeh (Persian: خلیل بیوک‌زاده, called Moravvej Ardabili in Persian: مروج اردبیلی, 18 September 1930 – 16 April 2001) was an Iranian Shiite Ayatollah and politician. He was a member of 1st, 2nd and 3rd Assembly of Experts from Ardabil Province electorate, and he was Representative of the Supreme Leader in Ardabil Province and first imam Jumu'ah for Ardabil in northwest of Iran after Iranian Revolution. An annual commemoration ceremony of Moravvej Ardabili is held in Ardabil.

== See also ==
- List of ayatollahs
- List of members in the First Term of the Council of Experts

Political offices
Preceded by Was not appointed	Imam Jumu'ah of Ardabil and Representative of the Supreme Leader; 1979- 2001	Succeeded by (Iran) Hassan Ameli
