= Nasrallah Shah-Abadi =

Iranian Ayatollah (1930–2018)

Ayatollah Sheikh Nasrallah Shah-Abadi
- آیت الله شیخ نصرالله شاه آبادی
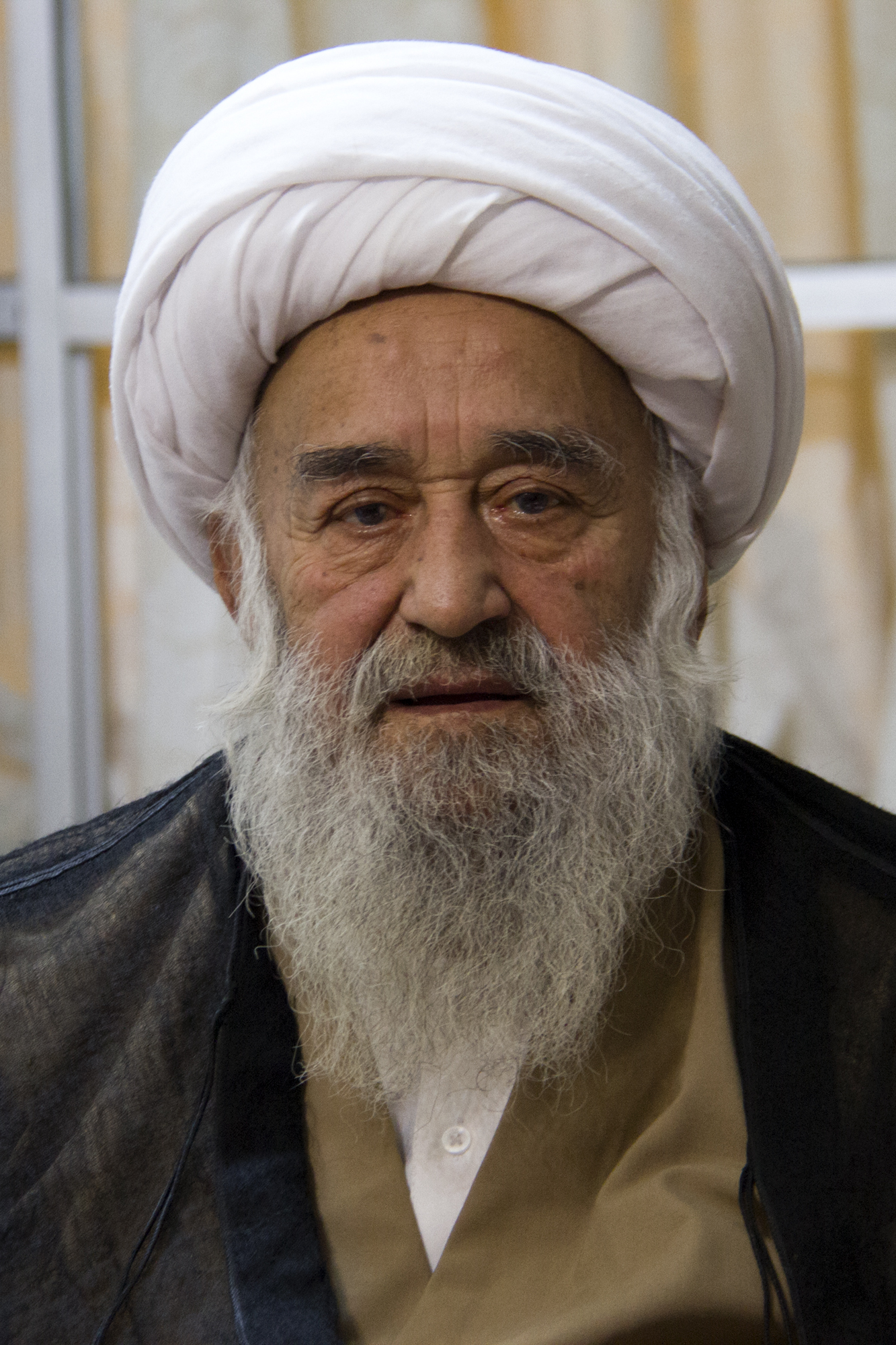
- An image of the late Ayatollah Sheikh Nasrallah Shah-Abadi

Member of the Fifth term of the Assembly of Experts.
- In office 26 February 2016 – 12 March 2018
- Preceded by: Reza Ostadi
- Succeeded by: Abbas Ali Akhtari
- Constituency: Tehran Province
- نصرالله شاه آبادی; Nasrallah Shah-Abadi
- Title: Ayatollah

Personal life
- Born: 24 September 1930 Qom, Imperial State of Iran
- Died: 12 March 2018 (aged 87) Tehran, Iran
- Resting place: Fatima Masumeh Shrine; 34.6417°N 50.8790°E
- Parent: Mohammad Ali Shah Abadi (father)
- Education: Qom Hawza

Religious life
- Religion: Islam
- Jurisprudence: Twelver Shia Islam

Sheikh Nasrallah Shah-Abadi Persian: شیخ نصرالله شاه آبادی, (24 September 1930 – 12 March 2018) was an Iranian Ayatollah. He represented the people of Tehran Province in the Fifth term of the Assembly of Experts.

== Early life and education ==
Nasrallah was born on 24 September 1930 in Qom to a religious family. His father, Mohammad Ali Shah Abadi was a Grand Ayatollah (Marja').

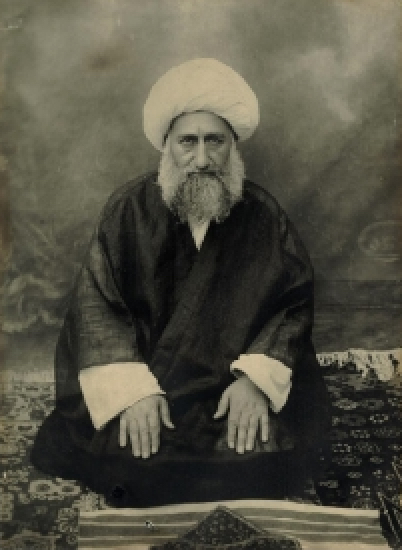
Grand Ayatollah Mohammad Ali Shah-Abadi, father of Nasrallah

Nasrallah attended Tawfiq Elementary School in Tehran for his primary education, then in 1941 he pursued his Religious education in Tehran. While in Tehran he was taught by several people, such as Mirza Mahdi Ashtiani and others. After the death of his father in 1949, he left Tehran for Qom to pursue his Islamic Studies in Qom Seminary. While in Qom he was taught by many big scholars such as Hossein Borujerdi, Mohammad Ali Araki, and others. Eventually, in 1952, he went to Najaf to attend the Hawza Najaf for advanced Islamic Studies (Darse Kharej). While there, he gained Ijtihad when he was around 30, and mastered several subjects such as Fiqh (Islamic Jurisprudence), Islamic philosophy, Tafsir (Interpretation of Quran), and others. He benefited from several big scholars in Najaf such as Abu al-Qasim al-Khoei, Muhsin al-Hakim and others. He was there when Ruhollah Khomeini arrived, and with his brother Ruhollah Shah-Abadi, they attended his classes in Najaf.

== Teachers ==
Here is a list of some of the teachers of Nasrallah Shah-Abadi.

- Mirza Mahdi Ashtiani
- Mirza Abolhassan Sha'rani
- Haj Agha Mostafa Masjid Jamei
- Seyed Sadr al-Din Razavi Qomi
- Seyed Mohammad Ali Lavasani
- Sheikh Hassan Zahir al-Dini
- Sheikh Hossein Kani
- Seyed Hassan Ahmadi Alunabadi
- Mirza Abolfazl Najmabadi
- Mirza Hedayatullah Vahid Golpayegani
- Sheikh Abbas Abbas Tehrani
- Seyed Mohammad Kazem Assar
- Hossein Borujerdi
- Seyyed Mohammad Hojjat Kooh Kamari
- Seyed Mohammad Taqi Khonsari
- Sheikh Abbas Ali Shahroudi
- Seyed Ali Beheshti
- Seyed Abu al-Qasim al-Khoei
- Seyed Muhsin al-Hakim
- Sheikh Hossein al-Hilli
- Seyed Abd al-Hadi al-Shirazi
- Seyed Ruhollah Khomeini

== Life after education ==
In 1970, with the request of Abu al-Qasim al-Khoei, he travelled to Pakistan to help establish teaching seminaries and work with the Shia in Pakistan. However, after only spending several months there, he had gotten Malaria and went to Iran to receive treatment. After receiving treatment in Iran, he was put on a travel-ban by the Pahlavi regime and was not allowed to travel back to Pakistan, nor back to Najaf. While in Iran, he would spend his time in Tehran and Qom offering prayers and teaching in seminaries. Leading up to the 1979 Iranian Revolution, he was active and protested against the Shah. After the revolution, he remained dedicated to teaching Islam, as well as actively engaging in charity work around Iran.

He was voted by the people of Tehran Province in the 2016 Iranian Assembly of Experts election to represent them in the Assembly of Experts. He held that position until his death.

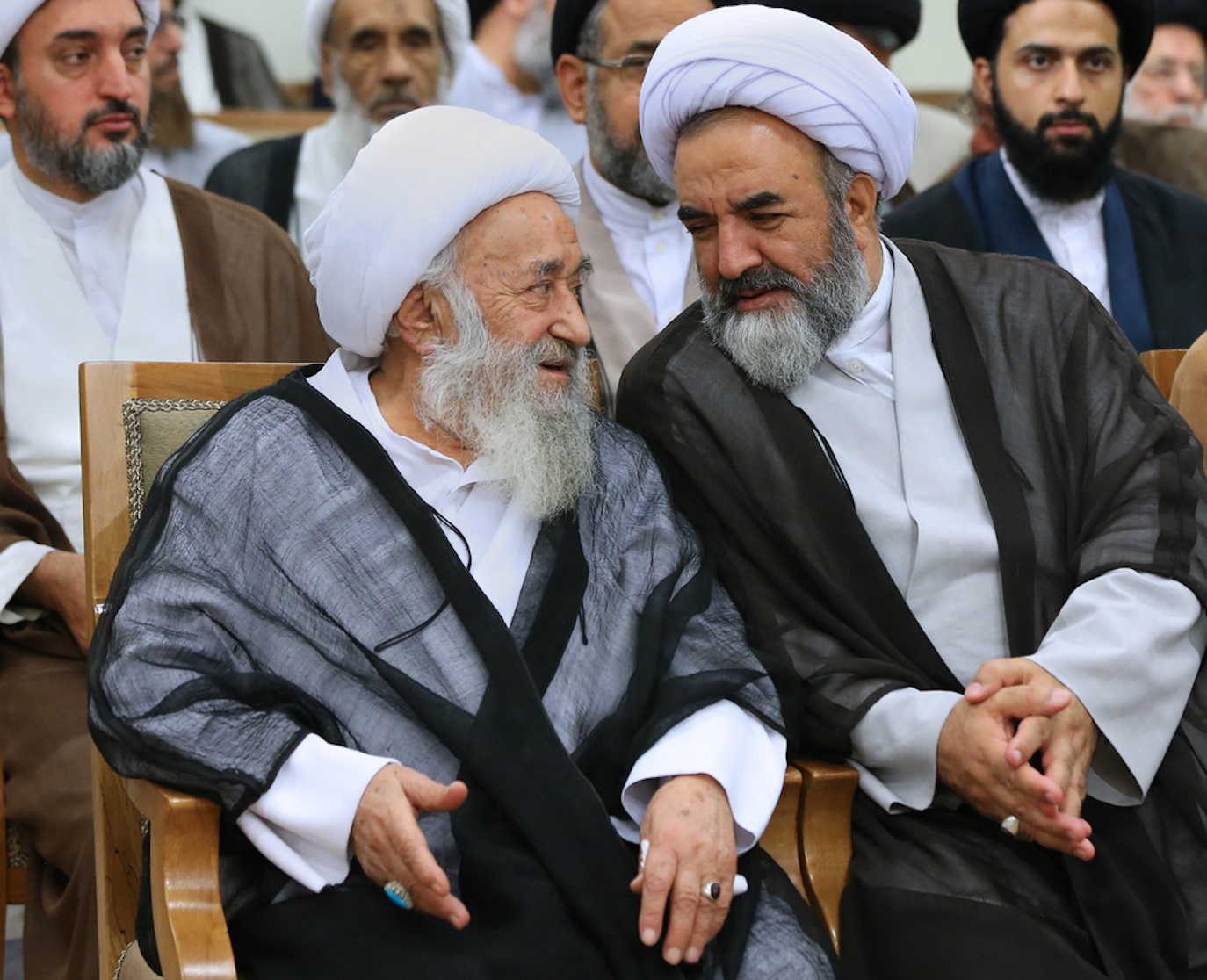
Nasrallah Shah-Abadi during a meeting with Ali Khamenei for the fifth term of the Assembly of Experts in 2016.

== Death ==
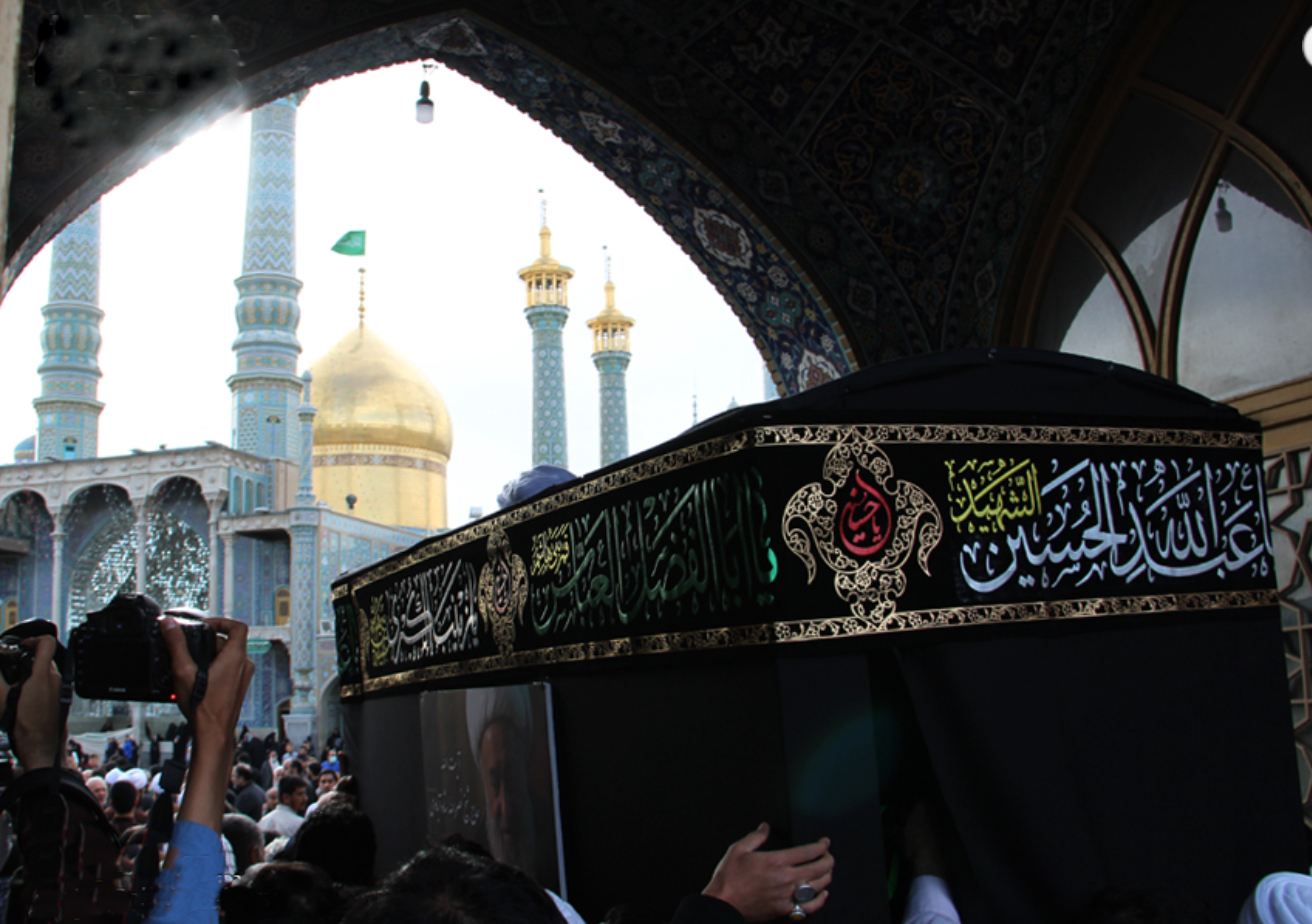
Funeral of Nasrollah Shah-Abadi in Qom, 14 March 2018

On 16 February 2018 Nasrallah was admitted to Baghiyyatollah al-Azam Military Hospital due to diabetic ulcers, as well as clogged arteries in his legs which led to respiratory arrest. He died on 12 March 2018 while in hospital. He was buried in Fatima Masumeh Shrine in Qom; his funeral prayers were led by Mousa Shubairi Zanjani. Ali Khamenei also sent a letter of condolence on his passing to his family.

== See also ==
- List of members in the Fifth Term of the Council of Experts
- 2016 Iranian Assembly of Experts election in Tehran Province
- List of ayatollahs
- Reza Ostadi
- Abbas Ali Akhtari
- List of provincial representatives appointed by Supreme Leader of Iran
