= Seyyed Ahmad Reza Shahrokhi =

Representative of the Supreme Leader of Iran (b. 1966)

- سید احمدرضا شاهرخی
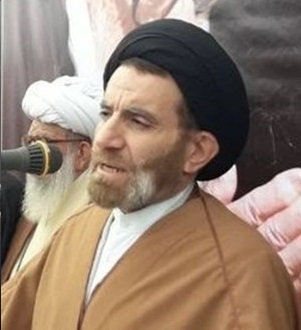

Representative of the Supreme Leader in Lorestan and Imam Jumu'ah of Khorramabad
- Incumbent
- Assumed office December 2019
- Preceded by: Seyyed Ahmad Mir-Emadi

Personal details
- Born: 1966 (age 59–60) Khorramabad, Imperial State of Iran
- Education: Qom Hawza

Seyyed Ahmad Reza Shahrokhi (Persian: سید احمدرضا شاهرخی; born 1966, Khorramabad, Lorestan), is the representative of the Supreme Leader of Iran in the province of Lorestan since 2019; and is also the Imam of Friday Prayer in the city of Khorramabad.

== Life ==
Seyyed Ahmad Reza who is known as "Ayatollah-Shahrokhi" and/or "Hojat-al-Islam Shahrokhi", is the son of "Seyyed Mohammad Naghi Shahrokhi" who was previously the representative of the Supreme leader in East Asia (i.e. in the countries of Thailand, Myanmar, Bangladesh, Sri Lanka, India). Seyyed Ahmad-Reza passed his seminary (Hawzah) education(s) by the known Shia scholars/teachers among Nasser Makarem Shirazi and Jafar Sobhani. He possesses a doctorate in the field of philosophy/theology; and he is a teacher at university courses, too. This Iranian Twelver cleric has also written several volumes of books/articles.

== See also ==
- List of provincial representatives appointed by Supreme Leader of Iran
