= Hasan Amili =

Iranian politician and Shia cleric (born 1962)

Ayatollah; Seyyed; Hasan Amili
- حسن عاملی
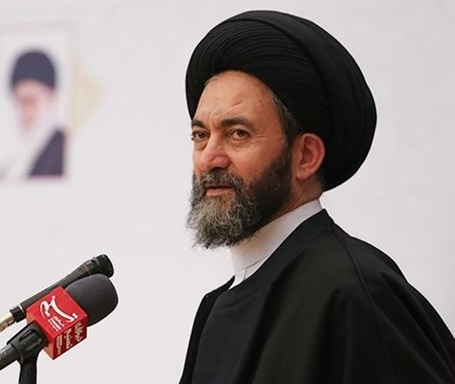

Member of Assembly of Experts
- Incumbent
- Assumed office December 15, 2006
- Constituency: Ardabil Province
- Majority: 382,854 (5th)
- Majority: 494,409 (4th)

Representative of the Supreme Leader in Ardabil Province and Imam Jumu'ah of Ardabil
- Incumbent
- Assumed office 2001
- Appointed by: Ali Khamenei
- Preceded by: Khalil Boyukzadeh Ahmad Fatemi

Personal details
- Born: 5 June 1962 (age 64) Ardabil, Iran
- Education: Qom Hawza and University of Tehran

Seyyed Hasan Amili Kalkhoran (Note: Persian: سید حسن عاملی کلخوران) (born 5 June 1962) is an Iranian politician and Shia cleric. A prominent figure in the principlist faction, Amili is a member of the Assembly of Experts from Ardabil Province. He also served as representative of supreme leader Ali Khamenei in Ardabil Province from 2001 until the latter's assassination in 2026.

== Early life ==
Hasan Amili was born on 5 June 1962 in Ardabil, Iran, to an Iranian Azeri family. He completed his religious studies from the Qom Seminary in Qom where he gained the clerical title Ayatollah. Amili earned his PhD degree in Shia Islamic jurisprudence from the University of Tehran.

== Political career ==
Amili is a member of 4th, 5th and 6th Assembly of Experts from Ardabil Province electorate. Amili has close ties with hardline principlist clerics Naser Makarem Shirazi and Ja'far Sobhani.

Amili is often considered one of the main contenders for the post of supreme leader of Iran.

== Views ==
Ameli said about the 2016 Armenian–Azerbaijani clashes: We have wish presence in Karabakh war, Karabakh is the territory of Islam. I'd personally go to Nagorno-Karabakh War. his speech at Friday Prayers had many reflections in Azerbaijani media.

In February 2025, Amili suggested that American president Donald Trump is the Dajjal antichrist prophesized in Islam.

In May 2025, Amili asserted that Iran should not dismantle its enrichment of uranium infrastructure.

== Notes ==
Political offices
| Preceded by (Iran) Moravvej Ardabili | Imam Jumu'ah of Ardabil and Representative of the Supreme Leader; 2001– present | Succeeded by N/A (incumbent) |
