= Muhammad Ali Hakim Movahhed Namazi Shirazi =

Ayatollah Hajj Muhammad Ali Hakim Movahhed Namazi Shirazi
- محمد علی حکیم موحد نمازی شیرازی

Personal life
- Born: Shiraz, Iran; 1903 Shiraz, Iran
- Died: ambiguous
- Resting place: ambiguous
- Main interest(s): Mysticism, Usul al-fiqh

Religious life
- Religion: Islam

Muslim leader
- Disciple of: Hazrate Vahid Al Olia, Aqa Sayyed Ali Mojtahid Kazerouni, Mirza Muhammad Sadiq Shirazi, Sayyed Jafar Abiverdi, Sayyed Ali Abiverdi, Mirza Mohsen

Ayatollah Hajj Muhammad Ali Hakim Movahhed Namazi Shirazi (born 1903, date of death unknown) was an Iranian mystic. He was noted as one of the masters of the philosophical schools of Tehran.

== Early life ==
Shirazi was born circa 1903 in Shiraz. His father, Mirza Abul Qasem, was a man of mysticism. He was first introduced to the school of Shoaeiyyah. He then learned religious sciences such as wisdom and jurisprudence. His spiritual teacher was Hazrate Vahid Al Olia and Aqa Sayyed Ali Mojtahid Kazerouni counted as his exoteric master. Some of his other teachers were Mirza Muhammad Sadiq Shirazi, Sayyed Jafar Abiverdi, Sayyed Ali Abiverdi, and Mirza Mohsen.

== Works ==
Shirazi wrote many treatises and books, most of them about mysticism and religious sciences. Some of them include:

- Maram Al Hikmah
- The collection of Fairness in 2 volumes
- Notes on Kefaye in Principles
- Notes on Fiqh
- Notes on the book of Four Journeys (Asfar)
- Latayef Al erfan in some volumes (two Volumes publicized)

== Later life ==
His pupils include Ayatollah Sayyed Razi Shirazi, Manouchehr Sadoughi Soha, Hajj Shekh Abul Hasan Shirazi Razavi, Mirza sayyed Mahdi Razavi, Abul Hasan Varzi, Dr. Abul Qasem Gorgi, Ayatollah Dr. Ahmad Beheshti, Professor Toshi Hiko Izutsu, Sayyed Bahr al Olum Mirdamadi, Shekh Jalal Al din Jafar Mahallati Shirazi, Professor Javad Mosleh, Ayatollah Sayyed Hasan Saadat Mostafavi, Dr. Sayyed Hasan Amin Sabzevari, a d Gholam Hosen Ebrahimi Dinani. The history of his death is unclear. According to sources when he went from Tehran to Shiraz in 1971 and he has not been heard from since.
