= Seyyed Mohammad Saeedi =

Iranian Ayatollah

- محمد سعیدی‌
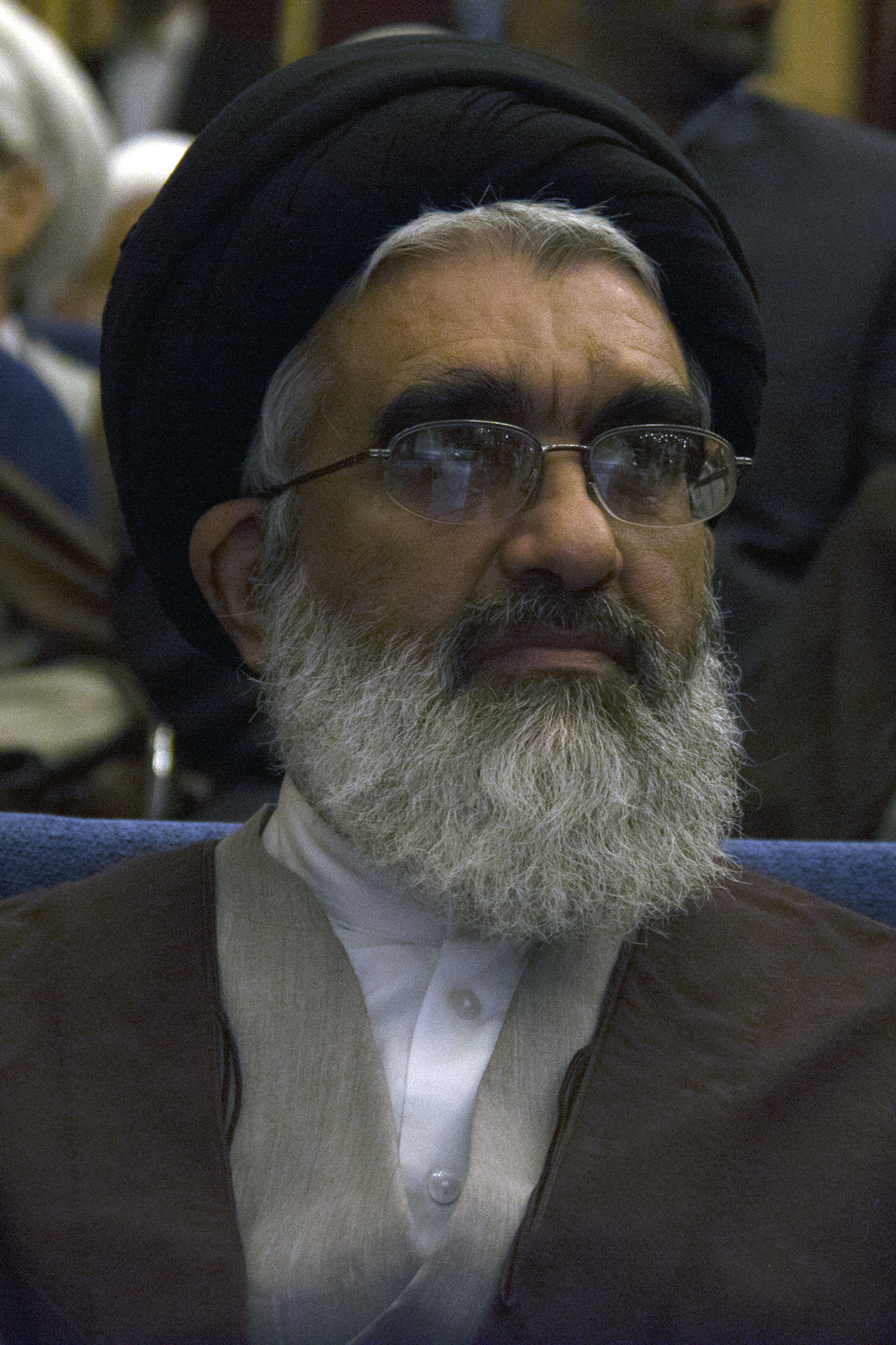
- Mohammad Saeedi, the trusteeship of Fatima Masumeh Shrine, Qom Imam of Friday Prayer; and the representative of Guardianship of the Islamic Jurist

Ayatollah

Member of the Assembly of Experts
- Incumbent
- Assumed office 8 March 2022
- Constituency: Qom Province
- Majority: 269,005

Personal details
- Born: 1951 (age 74–75) Qom, Iran

Mohammad Saeedi (Persian: محمد سعیدی; born 1951, Qom) is an Iranian Twelver Shia cleric, who is the trustee of the Fatima Masumeh Shrine, and Qom Imam of Friday Prayer. He is also the representative of Guardianship of the Islamic Jurist of Qom.

== Family ==
Mohammad Reza Saeedi was Mohammad's father; and his mother is from the family (descendants) of Mirza Shirazi. He is also the brother-in-law of Ahmad Khatami, the (temporary) Imam of Friday Prayer, of Tehran.

== Education ==
Mohammad Saeedi, who was born in Qom, passed his elementary education in his city, and studied for high school in the city of Tehran. Considering his father's testament, Seyyed Mohammad (and his brothers) entered the Hawzah (seminary). He passed his Hawzah education in Mashhad, and got married in that city. Later, he moved to Qom to continue his seminary education, and likewise, he taught there as a teacher. Mohammad had several teachers, amongst Mirza Hashem Amoli, Fazel Lankarani, Jawad Tabrizi, etc.

== Works ==
1. A collection of topics on jurisprudence and principles 2. A collection of topics outside jurisprudence taken from "Urwah al-Wathqi" and "Tahrir al-Wasilah" 3. A collection of topics outside principles that were raised among students and scholars based on "Kifayah". 4. A collection of notes on the life of the infallibles. 5. A course on the principles of belief 6. On the interpretation of the Quran. 7. A series of lessons on the interpretation of supplications: "Sahifa Sajjadiyyah" 8. Biography of one's father 9. A series of lessons on the rights and duties of husband and wife 10. History of the prophets 11. The role of the youth in the Ashura movement 12. Hadith of gifts 13. "The message of the martyrs of Karbala". 14. Human talents and abilities and the quality of developing them. 15. Human qualities based on the alphabet.

== See also ==
- Fatima Masumeh Shrine
- Ali Akbar Masoudi Khomeini
