= Mostafa Boroujerdi =

20th and 21st-century Iranian ayatollah

Ayatollah Dr. Boroujerdi
- Title: Ayatollah Doctor

Personal life
- Born: 1962 (age 63–64)
- Region: Iran

Religious life
- Religion: Islam
- Jurisprudence: Ja`fari

Muslim leader
- Influenced by: Fazel Lankarani, Javadi Amoli

Ayatollah Mostafa Boroujerdi(Persian: مصطفی بروجردی) (born 1962) is an Iranian Twelver Shi'a.

He studied in the seminaries of Qom, Iran under the Grand Ayatollah Mohammad Fazel Lankarani and Mohammad Mahdi Bojnourdi.

== See also ==
- List of ayatollahs
- List of maraji
