= Gholam Hossein Tabrizi =

Iranian cleric (1886–1980)

Ayatollah Sheikh Gholam Hossein Tabrizi (Persian: غلامحسین تبریزی; 1886 – 14 June 1980) was an Iranian Shia cleric. He was the father of Mohammad-Mehdi Abdekhodaei and Mohammad-Hadi Abdekhodaei.

Tabrizi was born in Vayqan in 1886, and died in Mashhad on 14 June 1980.
