= Mohammad-Mehdi Abdekhodaei =

Iranian conservative activist

- محمدمهدی عبدِخدایی
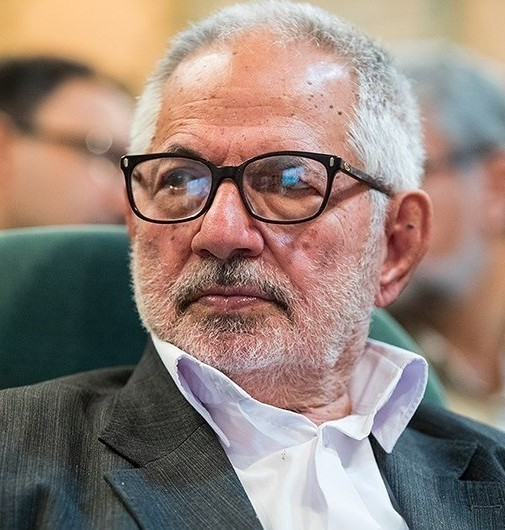
- Abdekhodaei in 2017
- Born: c. 1936 or 1937 (age 89–90)
- Political party: Fada'iyan-e Islam
- Father: Gholam Hossein Tabrizi

Mohammad-Mehdi Abdekhodaei (Persian: محمدمهدی عبدِخدایی; born 1936 or 1937) is an Iranian conservative activist.

Son of Sheikh Gholamhosein Mojtahed-e Tabrizi, he had a lower-middle-class bazaari background and was a minor attendant in a small hardware store. On 13 February 1952, when he was a 15-year-old member of the Fada'iyan-e Islam, he attempted to assassinate Hossein Fatemi who was delivering a speech at the grave of journalist Mohammad Masud who had been assassinated in 1948. Fatemi survived the shooting. Abdekhodaei was tried as a juvenile and imprisoned for twenty months.

He revived the Fada'iyan-e Islam after the Iranian Revolution, though the organization is not a significant actor.

Party political offices
Vacant Unknown	Secretary-General of the Fada'iyan-e Islam; Unknown–present	Incumbent
