= Aboutaleb Pishvai =

Iranian Ayatollah (1896-1978)

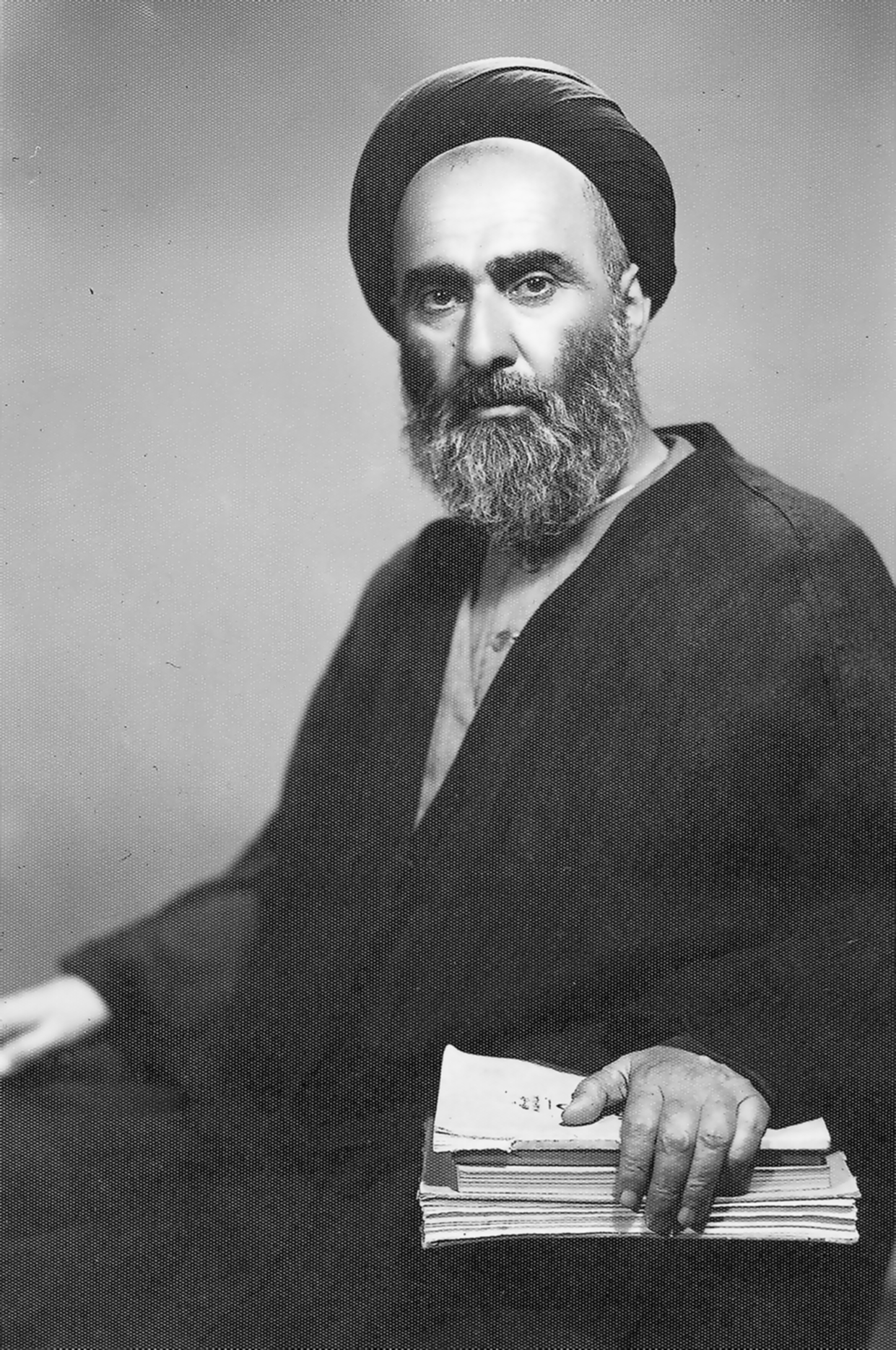
Ayatollah Seyyed Aboutaleb Pishvai

Ayatollah Seyyed Aboutaleb Pishvai (Persian: الله سید ابو طالب پیشوایی; Bandar-e Anzali, c. 1896-21 October 1978) was a prominent Iranian Ayatollah.

== Biography ==
He first studied for five years in Rasht and Kazemein (Kadhimayn) He continued his study for 14 years at Najaf (Iraq), but returned to Bandar-e Anzali, a harbour town on the Caspian Sea, and became its Imam Jome (religious leader). He would play a key role in the reconstruction of the Friday Mosque there.

In 1961 Ayatollah Khomeini visited a scholar's home in Qom in order to meet Ayatollah Pishvai. His son, Seyyed Mohammad Javad Pishvai, was dressed in clerical garbs by Ayatollah Khomeini.

As his death coincided with the start of the Iranian Revolution and also due to his popularity his funeral drew huge crowds. He was buried in his own mosque.

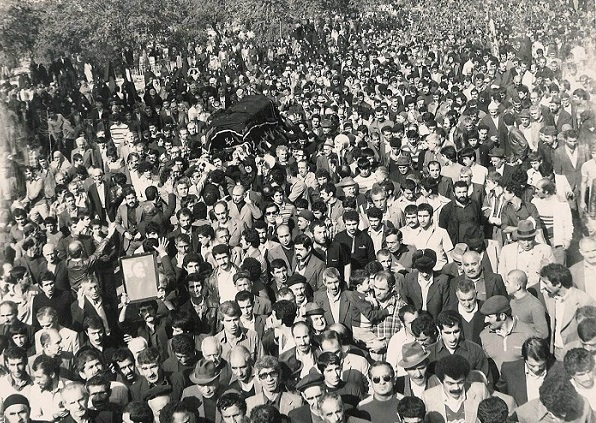
Funeral of Ayatollah Seyyed Aboutaleb Pishvai
