= Mohammad Ali Shirazi =

Iraqi Twelver Shi'a cleric (1947–2024)

Ayatollah Sayyid Mohammad Ali Shirazi

Personal life
- Born: 1947 Najaf, Kingdom of Iraq
- Died: 19 December 2024 (aged 76–77) Qom, Iran
- Website: www.shirazi-sa.ir

Religious life
- Religion: Islam
- Denomination: Shi'a
- Sect: Twelver

Ayatollah Sayyid Mohammad Ali Shirazi (Note: Arabic: محمد علي شيرازي, romanized: Muḥammad ʿAlī Shīrāzī) (1947 – 19 December 2024) was an Iraqi Twelver Shi'a cleric.

He studied in seminaries of Najaf, Iraq under Grand Ayatollah Abul-Qassim Khoei and Jawad Tabrizi. He lived in Qom, Iran until his death in 2024.
