= Mahdi Puya =

Personal life
- Born: Agha Hajji Mirza Mahdi Puya Yazdi; 1899 Yazd, Iran
- Died: July 17, 1973 (aged 73–74) Karachi, Pakistan
- Children: Agha Murtaza Pooya, Agha Mirza Ali Pooya
- Notable work: Tafsir of the Qur'an
- Known for: Tafsir of the Qur'an
- Other name: Pooya
- Occupation: Islamic scholar

Religious life
- Religion: Islam
- Denomination: Shia

Ayatullah Agha Hajji Mirza Mahdi Puya Yazdi (1899 (1317 A.H., also spelled as 'Pooya') – 1973 (1393 A.H.)) was a Twelver Shia Muslim and an Islamic scholar, most notable for his famous tafsir of the Qur'an. The son of the scholar Agha Mirza Muhammad Hasan of Yazd, Iran, Ayatullah Puya studied under his father as well as the eminent religious authority Agha Mirza Muhammad Husain al-Na'ini, who helped him to develop his interpretive specialization in the Qur'an. Unsettled political conditions in Iran and Iraq helped to persuade Ayatullah Puya to migrate from al-Najaf to India in 1343/1925. He settled down in Madras and Bangalore, where he gained the chance to study modern western thought directly in English, so that he became equipped to evaluate the diverse intellectual trends of both east and west. In Madras also he encountered Mir Ahmad Ali, who produced the first substantial Shi`i commentary on the Qur'an in English and who incorporated Ayatullah Puya's illuminating philosophical notes on the verses of the Qur'an into his work. Ayatullah Puya later moved to Pakistan, where he died in Karachi on 17 July 1973. He left two sons, Agha Murtaza Pooya and Agha Mirza Ali Pooya.

== Works ==
His complete exegesis (tafsir) can be accessed by Al-Quran project. An abrogated version of his can be accessed through Ahlul Bayt DILP at their quranic website.
