= Syed Ali Damad =

Iranian Ayatollah (1844–1917)

Seyyed Ali Tabrizi (Persian: سید علی تبریزی; 1844 – 7 December 1917), was an Iranian constitutionalist.

Seyyed Ali Tabrizi, who because of the bridegroom Sheikh Muhammad Hassan Mamaghani is his Syed Ali Damad say.

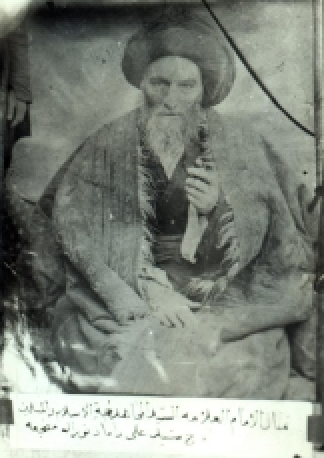
An image of Ayatollah Haj Mirza Syed Ali Damad

== Professors ==
(Sayyad Ali) in the second half of the 13th century was a way of Najaf. People like Sheikh Hadi Tehrani, Mirza Habibollah Rashti and Sheikh Muhammad Hassan Mamaghani appeared and reached the rank of ijtihad. Also Mohammad-Kaze<is now a masterpiece.

== Life ==
Ayatollah Ali Tabrizi was one of the scholars and clerics of the Qajar period. In 1321 AD he published a theological book about the pro-constitution time of tyranny Minor (with Mirza Ahmad Khan Marlvyy and others) to strengthen the Mujahedin-e Tabriz and Sattar Khan and Baqir Khan on ways of battle fronts. At the time of the First World War and the occupation of Iraq by England, Seyyed Ali Damad was one of the main leaders of the war against the British armies. He died on 7 December 1917 and was buried near the grave of Mulla Sadra.
