= Hasan Raza Ghadiri =

Pakistani Shia scholar (1952–2024)

Ayatollah Hasan Raza Ghadiri حسن رضا غدیری
- Title: Ayatollah

Personal life
- Born: 14 August 1952 Lahore, West Pakistan, Pakistan
- Died: 21 August 2024 (aged 72)
- Parent: Mufti Muzammil Hussain (father)
- Other name: Arabic/Persian/ Saraiki / English /Punjabi/Urdu: حسن رضا غدیری

Religious life
- Religion: Shia Islam

Senior posting
- Based in: London, United Kingdom
- Post: Ayatollah

Hasan Raza Ghadiri (Note: Urdu: حسن رضا غدیری, romanized: Ḥasan Raẓā Ghadīrī) (14 August 1952 – 21 August 2024) was a Shia scholar who was one of the only Shia ayatollahs (mujtahid) of Pakistan.

== Biography ==
Hasan Raza Ghadiri was born in Pakistan and studied in various locations including Lahore, Multan, and Ali-Pur. He later travelled to Iran and completed his studies at the hands of various Grand Ayatollahs, including Fazil Lankarani, Mar'ashi Najafi, Al-Gulpaigaani, Jawadi Al-Amuli and others, he has his unique style of lecture and teaching that his speeches were aired on many national media platforms to help the communities to live peacefully. In 2007 became the first Shia ayatollah to receive the title of Ambassador of Peace from the World Federation of Peace (USA). He attended and spoke at the world peace meeting in Seoul, South Korea. Ayatollah Ghadiri is UK's top Shia Cleric and famous for his knowledge, kindness and his down-to-earth attitude.

== Social activities ==
Hasan Raza Ghadiri was the head or a member of many organizations to work for social welfare and peace in community and respect of national law. some of them are:

- Shia Sharia Council (UK)
- Al-Ghadeer Educational Trust (UK)
- World Council For Peace And Justice (UK)
- World Organization For The Preservation Of Holy Places (UK)
- Al-Ghadeer Foundation LHR

== Lectures ==
Ayatollah Ghadiri has served the nation around the globe, he has given lectures in Pakistan, India, United Kingdom, France, Germany, the Netherlands, Belgium, Denmark, Sweden, Switzerland, Norway, Italy, Spain, United States, Canada and throughout the UK.

== Works ==
Ayatollah Hasan Raza Ghadiri has written more than 190 books in various languages including Urdu, Arabic, Persian and English.

=== Books written ===
Some of his famous books are named as:

=== Urdu Books ===
- Tareekh -e- Jannat -ul- Baquee,
- Suraj Badilon Ki Ouut Say,
- Ali Mola,
- Saheefa -e- Ali,
- Maktab -e- Ahlul Bait (a.s),
- Saheefa -e- Panjjtan,
- Tohfa -tul- Momineen,
- Jahad Aur Dehshat Gardi,
- Kalaam-e-Imam (as),
- Zainab Zainab Hai,
- Jaam -e- Ghaddir,
- Hussain Maira,
- Zanjeer -e- Hayat,
- Maktab -e- Ahlebait (as)
- Wafaq Islami Deniyat,
- Al-Baquee Al-Munawwar,
- Charaagh -e- Adab,
- Tohfatul Abrar,
- An-Nijaat,
- Tafseer Surah Fatiha,
- Parishaan Na Hon,
- Walidain Ke Haqooq,
- Taleem e Ahkaam,
- Science Se Khuda Ki Pehchaan Tak,
- Saheefa -e- Panjtan (as)
- Minhaj ul Hussain (as)
- Tafseer Khutba -e- Ghadeer
- Zikr -e- Hussain, and
- Zinda Tehreerain.

=== Arabic Books ===
- Wamazaatil Basmallah (Tasfeer of Bismillah)
- Ash-Shifaau Fi Turbatil Hussain (as) – (Cure in the Sand of Imam Hussain – Khak e Shifa)
- Al-Arbaeen Fazaail Ameer ul Momineen (as),
- Ahaadis -e- Nourania,
- Kitaab ul Miraas,

=== Arabic Books Commentary (Ta'leqaat) ===
- Shariyat Takleef,
- Shariyyat Touqeet,
- Shariyyat Mawasilaat,
- Shariyyat Khidmat,
- Shariyyat Tarheeb,
- Shariyyat Jumma,
- Shariyyat Jenin,
- Shariyyat Tajweed,
- Shariyyat Waqf,
- Shariyyat Aashura,
- Shariyyat Aal
- Shariyyat Jineen
- Shariyyat Sujood,
- Shariyyat Salat,
- Shariyyat Istinsaakh,
- Shariyyat Irhaab,
- Mutatlibat Al-Ummah,

He has also written several books in Arabic, including Wamzatun Min Wamazaat Al- Basmalah, Al-Arbaeen Fi Manaaqib Ameer Al-Momineen, Tohfa -tul- Abrar, and Arabic Language Course (6 Volumes), and several books in Persian, including Nizaam Siyasi Islam and Imam Ali – Algoi Barai Jahan -e- Bashariyyat.

Ali Mola
- Author: Written By Ayatollah Al-Ghadiri

=== Translations ===
(The Books Ayatoolah Ghadiri Has Translated into Urdu From Other Languages)

- Al-Meezan (Tafseer Al- Quran) (20 Volumes)
- Zainab Zainab Hai
- Tafseer Sura-e-Fatiha

=== Poetry ===
(The Poetry Written By Ayatollah Ghadiri on Various Social And Religious Topics)

- Hussain Maira
- Jaam -e- Ghadir
- Zanjeer -e- Hayyat
- Ali Nahin To Kuchh Nahin
- Harf -e- Ehsaas
- Mohsin -e- Millat

== Magazines and articles ==
Ayatollah Hasan Raza Ghadiri is the head of many International Magazines worldwide, and he has written hundreds of articles on various topics. The relevant magazines are listed below.

- Al-Ghadeer (Pakistan)
- Al-Aasaar (London)
- Paigham-e-Nijaat (Germany)
- Aagaahi (London)
- Raaz-e-Dill(Persian – London)
- 4u(English – London)
- Daily Jang(London – Pakistan)
- Daily Nawa -i- Waqt (Pakistan)
- Daily Pakistan (Pakistan)
- Al-Muntazar (Pakistan)
- Al-Rai Al-Aakhar(Arabic – London)

== Honors ==
Ayatollah Hasan Raza Ghadiri has been awarded with many honors by various worldwide organizations and institutes, including those listed below.

- Ambassador of Peace
- Peace Assembly Member (London)
- Chairmanship of World Shia Foundation (UK)
- Chairmanship of Islamic Council (UK)
- Chairmanship of Azadari Council (UK)

== Organizations ==
Ayatollah Hasan Raza Ghadiri is the founder or most senior member of the international organizations, including the Azadari Council (UK), Islamic Judiciary Council (UK), WOPHP (UK), World Council For Peace And Justice (UK), and Al-Ghadir Trust (Pakistan).

== TV channel ==
The Shia TV channel "AhleBait TV" began transmission from 1 August 2009 on Sky channel 836. Ayatollah Ghadiri is the founder of Ahlebait TV.

== His son Hashim Raza Ghadiri ==
Moulana Hashim Raza Ghadiri
- Born: 1984 (age 41–42); Pakistan

Of his sons, Hashim Raza Ghadiri, is also a religious scholar and was famous even in his youth as he was a talented individual who could speak and write Urdu, Arabic, English, Punjabi and Saraiki. He studied in Najaf under the supervision of Ayatullah Uzma Hafiz Bashir Hussain Najafi from 2004 to 2008.

Moulana Hashim Raza Ghadiri
- Born: 1984 (age 41–42); Pakistan
- Political party: British Peace Assembly

He is a favorite scholar due to his peace activities and defensive lectures for his faith. He was awarded as "Youth Peace Symbol" by Brixton University London, and he is a member of British Peace Assembly UK.

He held the community record for attracting the largest crowds to his lectures during the last year Moharram held in Bradford Hussainia Islamic Centre. Officials said the average attendance surpassed 2000 men and women every day. According to unofficial sources the number reached 2400.
