= Qiasabad =

Qiasabad or Qeyasabad or Qiyasabad or Gheysabad or Gheyasabad or Ghiasabad or Ghiyas Abad or Ghiyasabad (Persian: قياس اباد or غياث آباد) may refer to:

- Ghiasabad, Fasa, Fars Province
- Ghiasabad, Kharameh, Fars Province
- Ghiasabad, Marvdasht, Fars Province
- Ghiasabad, Kashan, Isfahan Province
- Ghiasabad, Kermanshah
- Ghiasabad, Kurdistan
- Ghiasabad, Markazi
- Qiasabad, Razavi Khorasan
- Qiasabad-e Olya, Razavi Khorasan Province
- Ghiasabad, Yazd
