= Mohammadabad, Garizat =

Village in Yazd province, Iran

Mohammadabad Persian: محمداباد
- Village
- Location within Iran
- Coordinates: 31°18′03″N 54°05′11″E
- Country: Iran
- Province: Yazd
- County: Taft
- District: Garizat
- Rural District: Garizat

Population (2016)
  - Total: 180
- Time zone: UTC+3:30 (IRST)

Mohammadabad (Persian: محمداباد) (Note: Also romanized as Moḩammadābād) is a village in Garizat Rural District of Garizat District in Taft County, Yazd province, Iran.

== Demographics ==
=== Population ===
At the time of the 2006 National Census, the village's population was 258 in 62 households, when it was in Nir District. The following census in 2011 counted 309 people in 84 households, by which time the rural district had been separated from the district in the establishment of Garizat District. The 2016 census measured the population of the village as 180 people in 54 households.
