= Kahduiyeh =

Village in Yazd province, Iran

Kahduiyeh Persian: كهدوئيه
- Village
- Location within Iran
- Coordinates: 31°23′42″N 53°55′08″E
- Country: Iran
- Province: Yazd
- County: Taft
- District: Garizat
- Rural District: Kahduiyeh

Population (2016)
  - Total: 589
- Time zone: UTC+3:30 (IRST)

Kahduiyeh (Persian: كهدوئيه) (Note: Also romanized as Kahdooyeh and Kahdū’īyeh; also known as Khadu and Khātu) is a village in, and the capital of, Kahduiyeh Rural District of Garizat District of Taft County, Yazd province, Iran.

== Demographics ==
=== Population ===
At the time of the 2006 National Census, the village's population was 742 in 219 households, when it was in Nir District. The following census in 2011 counted 718 people in 222 households, by which time the rural district had been separated from the district in the establishment of Garizat District. The 2016 census measured the population of the village as 589 people in 197 households. It was the most populous village in its rural district.
