= Fathabad, Taft =

Fathabad فتح اباد
- Village
- Location within Iran
- Coordinates: 31°24′03″N 53°55′33″E
- Country: Iran
- Province: Yazd
- County: Taft
- Bakhsh: Nir
- Rural District: Kahduiyeh

Population (2006)
  - Total: 47
- Time zone: UTC+3:30 (IRST)
  - Summer (DST): UTC+4:30 (IRDT)

Fathabad (Persian: فتح اباد, romanized: Fatḩābād; also known as Fatḩābād-e Golshan and Fathābād-e Golshan) is a village in Kahduiyeh Rural District, Nir District, Taft County, Yazd Province, Iran. At the 2006 census, its population was 47, in 15 families.
