= Nasrabad, Nir =

Nasrabad نصراباد
- Village
- Location within Iran
- Coordinates: 31°24′59″N 53°56′01″E
- Country: Iran
- Province: Yazd
- County: Taft
- Bakhsh: Nir
- Rural District: Kahduiyeh

Population (2006)
  - Total: 19
- Time zone: UTC+3:30 (IRST)
  - Summer (DST): UTC+4:30 (IRDT)

Nasrabad (Persian: نصراباد, also Romanized as Naşrābād) is a village in Kahduiyeh Rural District, Nir District, Taft County, Yazd Province, Iran. At the 2006 census, its population was 19, in 6 families.
