= Mehdiabad, Kahduiyeh =

Mehdiabad مهدي اباد
- Village
- Location within Iran
- Coordinates: 31°24′43″N 53°55′54″E
- Country: Iran
- Province: Yazd
- County: Taft
- Bakhsh: Nir
- Rural District: Kahduiyeh

Population (2006)
  - Total: 38
- Time zone: UTC+3:30 (IRST)
  - Summer (DST): UTC+4:30 (IRDT)

Mehdiabad (Persian: مهدي اباد, romanized: Mehdīābād; also known as Ḩājjī Khān) is a village in Kahduiyeh Rural District, Nir District, Taft County, Yazd Province, Iran. At the 2006 census, its population was 38, in 10 families.
