= Ghiasabad, Yazd =

Ghiasabad غياث‌آباد
- Village
- Location within Iran
- Coordinates: 31°28′33″N 53°55′33″E
- Country: Iran
- Province: Yazd
- County: Taft
- Bakhsh: Nir
- Rural District: Banadkuk

Population (2006)
  - Total: 47
- Time zone: UTC+3:30 (IRST)
  - Summer (DST): UTC+4:30 (IRDT)

Ghiasabad (Persian: غياث‌آباد, also Romanized as Ghīās̄ābād, Gheyāsābād, Gheyas̄ābād, Ghīāsābād, and Ghiyas Abad) is a village in Banadkuk Rural District, Nir District, Taft County, Yazd Province, Iran. At the 2006 census, its population was 47, in 24 families.
