= Reshkuiyeh =

Reshkuiyeh رشكوئيه
- Village
- Location within Iran
- Coordinates: 31°18′03″N 54°00′50″E
- Country: Iran
- Province: Yazd
- County: Taft
- Bakhsh: Nir
- Rural District: Garizat

Population (2006)
  - Total: 951
- Time zone: UTC+3:30 (IRST)
  - Summer (DST): UTC+4:30 (IRDT)

Reshkuiyeh (Persian: رشكوئيه, also Romanized as Reshkū’īyeh; also known as Ashk, Ashkui, Ashkū’īyeh, and Reshgūyeh) is a village in Garizat Rural District, Nir District, Taft County, Yazd Province, Iran. At the 2006 census, its population was 951, in 282 families.
