= Dizran =

Dizran ديزران
- Village
- Location within Iran
- Coordinates: 31°22′32″N 53°54′32″E
- Country: Iran
- Province: Yazd
- County: Taft
- Bakhsh: Nir
- Rural District: Kahduiyeh

Population (2006)
  - Total: 264
- Time zone: UTC+3:30 (IRST)
  - Summer (DST): UTC+4:30 (IRDT)

Dizran (Persian: ديزران, romanized: Dīzrān; also known as Deh Zarūn, Dīzān, and Dizroon) is a village in Kahduiyeh Rural District, Nir District, Taft County, Yazd Province, Iran. At the 2006 census, its population was 264, in 73 families.
