= Ghiasabad-e Bala =

Ghiasabad-e Bala (Persian: غياث آبادبالا) may refer to:

- Ghiasabad-e Bala, Isfahan
- Ghiasabad-e Bala, Razavi Khorasan
