= Bazuk-e Malek =

Bazuk-e Malek بازوك ملك
- Village
- Country: Iran
- Province: Yazd
- County: Taft
- Bakhsh: Nir
- Rural District: Sakhvid

Population (2006)
  - Total: 27
- Time zone: UTC+3:30 (IRST)
  - Summer (DST): UTC+4:30 (IRDT)

Bazuk-e Malek (Persian: بازوك ملك, also Romanized as Bāzūk-e Malek) is a village in Sakhvid Rural District, Nir District, Taft County, Yazd Province, Iran. At the 2006 census, its population was 27, in 9 families.
