= Bazuk-e Arbab =

Bazuk-e Arbab بازوك ارباب
- Village
- Location within Iran
- Coordinates: 31°30′11″N 54°04′10″E
- Country: Iran
- Province: Yazd
- County: Taft
- Bakhsh: Nir
- Rural District: Sakhvid

Population (2006)
  - Total: 50
- Time zone: UTC+3:30 (IRST)
  - Summer (DST): UTC+4:30 (IRDT)

Bazuk-e Arbab (Persian: بازوك ارباب, also Romanized as Bāzūk-e Ārbāb; also known as Bāzok) is a village in Sakhvid Rural District, Nir District, Taft County, Yazd Province, Iran. At the 2006 census, its population was 50 in 11 families.
