= Jowzestan, Yazd =

Jowzestan جوزستان
- Village
- Location within Iran
- Coordinates: 31°29′59″N 54°03′58″E
- Country: Iran
- Province: Yazd
- County: Taft
- Bakhsh: Nir
- Rural District: Sakhvid

Population (2006)
  - Total: 15
- Time zone: UTC+3:30 (IRST)
  - Summer (DST): UTC+4:30 (IRDT)

Jowzestan (Persian: جوزستان, also Romanized as Jowzestān; also known as Jowdestān) is a village in Sakhvid Rural District, Nir District, Taft County, Yazd Province, Iran. At the 2006 census, its population was 15, in 5 families.
