= Gariz-e Olya =

Gariz-e Olya گاريزعليا
- Village
- Location within Iran
- Coordinates: 31°18′25″N 54°06′17″E
- Country: Iran
- Province: Yazd
- County: Taft
- Bakhsh: Nir
- Rural District: Garizat

Population (2006)
  - Total: 143
- Time zone: UTC+3:30 (IRST)
  - Summer (DST): UTC+4:30 (IRDT)

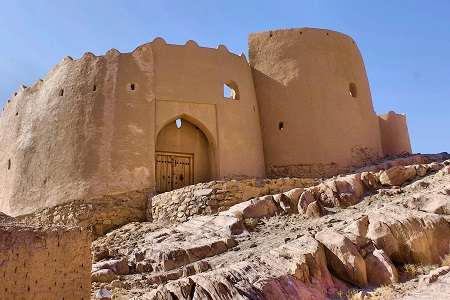

Gariz-e Olya (Persian: گاريزعليا, also Romanized as Gārīz-e ‘Olyā; also known as Gārīz-e Bālā, Kārez ‘Arab, Kārīz-e ‘Arab, Kārīz-e Bālā, and Korz ‘Arab) is a village in Garizat Rural District, Nir District, Taft County, Yazd Province, Iran. At the 2006 census, its population was 143, in 42 families.
