= Gariz =

Gariz (Persian: گاريز), also rendered as Karez or Kariz, may refer to:

- Gariz-e Olya
- Gariz-e Sofla
