= Gariz-e Sofla =

Gariz-e Sofla گاريزسفلي
- Village
- Location within Iran
- Coordinates: 31°18′07″N 54°06′09″E
- Country: Iran
- Province: Yazd
- County: Taft
- Bakhsh: Nir
- Rural District: Garizat

Population (2006)
  - Total: 126
- Time zone: UTC+3:30 (IRST)
  - Summer (DST): UTC+4:30 (IRDT)

Gariz-e Sofla (Persian: گاريزسفلي, also Romanized as Gārīz-e Soflá; also known as Gorz Soflá, Kārez Sufla, Kārīz, Kārīz-e Pā’īn, and Kārīz-e Soflá) is a village in Garizat Rural District, Nir District, Taft County, Yazd Province, Iran. At the 2006 census, its population was 126, in 42 families.
