= Hadi Khani, Yazd =

Hadi Khani هادي خاني
- Village
- Location within Iran
- Coordinates: 31°19′21″N 54°03′16″E
- Country: Iran
- Province: Yazd
- County: Taft
- Bakhsh: Nir
- Rural District: Garizat

Population (2006)
  - Total: 13
- Time zone: UTC+3:30 (IRST)
  - Summer (DST): UTC+4:30 (IRDT)

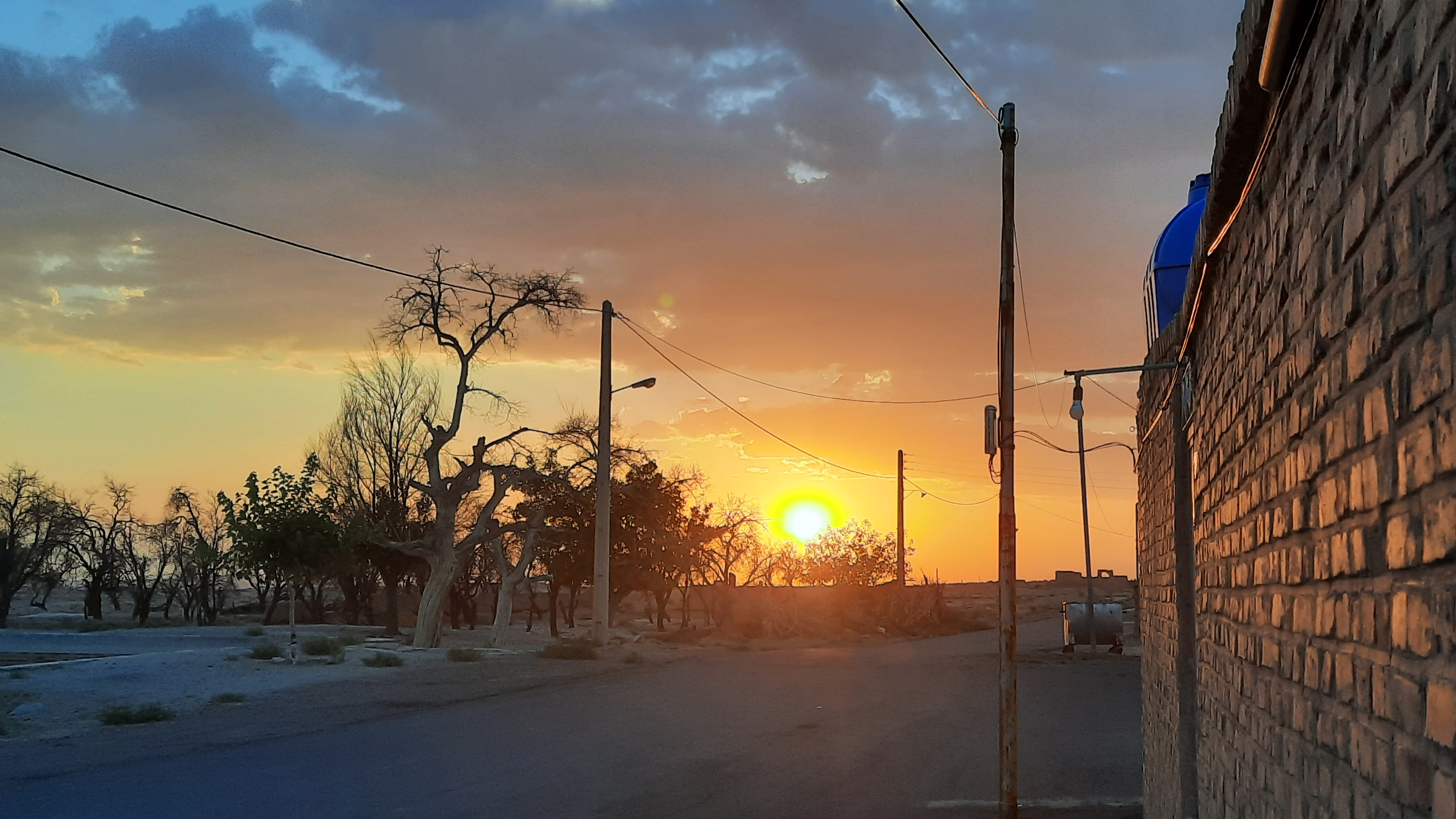

Hadi Khani (Persian: هادي خاني, also Romanized as Hādī Khānī) is a village in Garizat Rural District, Nir District, Taft County, Yazd Province, Iran. At the 2006 census, its population was 13, in 4 families.
