= Banadkuk-e Dizeh =

Village in Yazd province, Iran

Banadkuk-e Dizeh Persian: بنادكوك ديزه
- Village
- Location within Iran
- Coordinates: 31°28′14″N 53°58′10″E
- Country: Iran
- Province: Yazd
- County: Taft
- District: Nir
- Rural District: Banadkuk

Population (2016)
  - Total: 1,227
- Time zone: UTC+3:30 (IRST)

Banadkuk-e Dizeh (Persian: بنادكوك ديزه) (Note: Also romanized as Banādkūk-e Dīzeh; also known as Banad Kook, Banādk-e Dīzeh, and Banādkūk) is a village in, and the capital of, Banadkuk Rural District of Nir District of Taft County, Yazd province, Iran.

== Demographics ==
=== Population ===
At the time of the 2006 National Census, the village's population was 1,535 in 483 households. The following census in 2011 counted 1,227 people in 440 households. The 2016 census measured the population of the village as 1,227 people in 440 households. It was the most populous village in its rural district.
