= Bazuk =

Bazuk (Persian: بازوك), also rendered as Bazok, may refer to:

- Bazuk-e Arbab
- Bazuk-e Malek
