= Imamzadeh Ahmad =

Imamzadeh in Isfahan, Iranian national heritage site

- Location of the complex in Iran

Religion
- Affiliation: Shia Islam
- Ecclesiastical or organisational status: Imamzadeh and mausoleum
- Status: Active

Location
- Location: Esfahan, Isfahan province
- Country: Iran
- Interactive map of Imamzadeh Ahmad
- Coordinates: 32°39′13″N 51°40′48″E

Architecture
- Type: Islamic architecture
- Style: Isfahani; Seljuk; Safavid
- Completed: 1141 CE; 1703 CE (renovations)

Specifications
- Dome: One (maybe more)
- Materials: Stone; stucco; plaster; mirrors
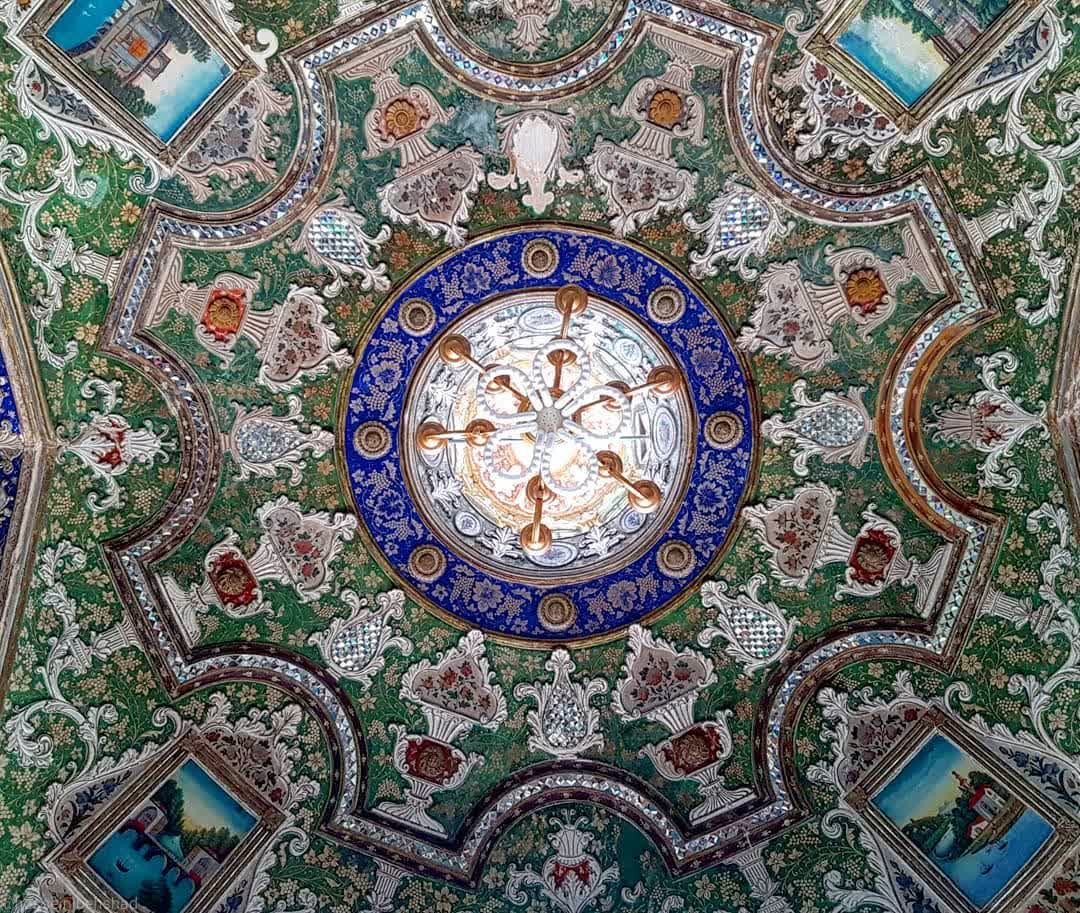
- The imamzadeh dome

Iran National Heritage List
- Official name: Imamzadeh Ahmad
- Type: Emamzadeh
- Designated: 1935
- Reference no.: 234
- Conservation organization: Cultural Heritage, Handicrafts and Tourism Organization of Iran

Imamzadeh Ahmad (Persian: امامزاده احمد) is a Shi'ite imamzadeh in Isfahan, Iran. The Imamzadeh comprises a mausoleum, to the north and west of which are two iwans; the tomb faces a vast sahn where several famous people, like Amir Kabir's daughter and Naser al-Din Shah's sister, are buried. The emamzadeh himself was likely the Sultan Ali's son, who has been buried in Mashhad-e Ardehal.

The complex was added to the Iran National Heritage List on 7 December 1935, administered by the Cultural Heritage, Handicrafts and Tourism Organization of Iran.

== Overview ==
The oldest part of the structure is a single piece of white stone, which is 3 metres (9.8 ft) long, said to be a piece of Somnath stone. The stone is placed under a wooden reticulated window, facing an alley. Jaberi Ansari wrote about the stone in the history of Isfahan and Rey as follows:

"Mahmud of Ghazni brought a stone as a souvenir from Somnath in India. It is said that it had been a part of the most important idol in that land. This stone was transferred to Isfahan and a century later it was cut in half and made a stone trough from one half in Vazir Tahmasb school and the other half was dragged on the ground (for demonstrating the abjection of the idol) and then it was taken to emamzadeh Ahmad."

Imamzadeh Ahmad was completed in 1141 CE, during the Seljukid era, however the present structure was completed in 1703 CE, during the Safavid era. The ceiling of the mausoleum is covered by Muqarnas works. Around the sepulcher there is a poem in golden Nastaliq script, in which Zellossoltan has mentioned repairments and revampings of this structure by him.

Unlike few decorations of the imamzadeh's tomb, the tomb of Amir Kabir's daughter and Naser al-Din Shah Qajar's sister have been fully decorated with stucco, painting and mirror decoration.

== See also ==
- Shia Islam in Iran
- List of imamzadehs in Iran
- List of mausoleums in Iran
- List of the historical structures in the Isfahan province
