= Ashk =

Ashk may refer to:

- Ashk (given name), a male given name of Iranian origin
- Ashk, Iran, a village in South Khorasan Province, Iran
- Ashk, Yazd, village in Yazd Province, Iran
- Ashk (TV series), a 2012 Pakistani drama serial

== See also ==
- Ashke, a 2018 Indian Punjabi-language film
