= Borzabad, Kashan =

Village in Isfahan province, Iran

Borzabad Persian: برز آباد
- Village
- Location within Iran
- Coordinates: 34°04′50″N 51°07′18″E
- Country: Iran
- Province: Isfahan
- County: Kashan
- District: Neyasar
- Rural District: Kuh Dasht

Population (2016)
  - Total: 362
- Time zone: UTC+3:30 (IRST)

Borzabad (Persian: برز آباد) (Note: Also romanized as Borzābād) is a village in Kuh Dasht Rural District of Neyasar District in Kashan County, Isfahan province, Iran.

== Demographics ==
=== Population ===
At the time of the 2006 National Census, the village's population was 114 in 32 households. The following census in 2011 counted 118 people in 37 households. The 2016 census measured the population of the village as 362 people in 117 households.
