= Tudeh, Nir =

Village in Yazd province, Iran

Tudeh Persian: توده
- Village
- Location within Iran
- Coordinates: 31°37′31″N 54°07′49″E
- Country: Iran
- Province: Yazd
- County: Taft
- District: Nir
- Rural District: Sakhvid

Population (2016)
  - Total: 217
- Time zone: UTC+3:30 (IRST)

Tudeh (Persian: توده) (Note: Also romanized as Tūdeh) is a village in, and the capital of, Sakhvid Rural District of Nir District of Taft County, Yazd province, Iran.

== Demographics ==
=== Population ===
At the time of the 2006 National Census, the village's population was 183 in 61 households. The following census in 2011 counted 283 people in 93 households. The 2016 census measured the population of the village as 217 people in 85 households. It was the most populous village in its rural district.
