= Bakh =

Village in Yazd province, Iran

Bakh Persian: بخ
- City
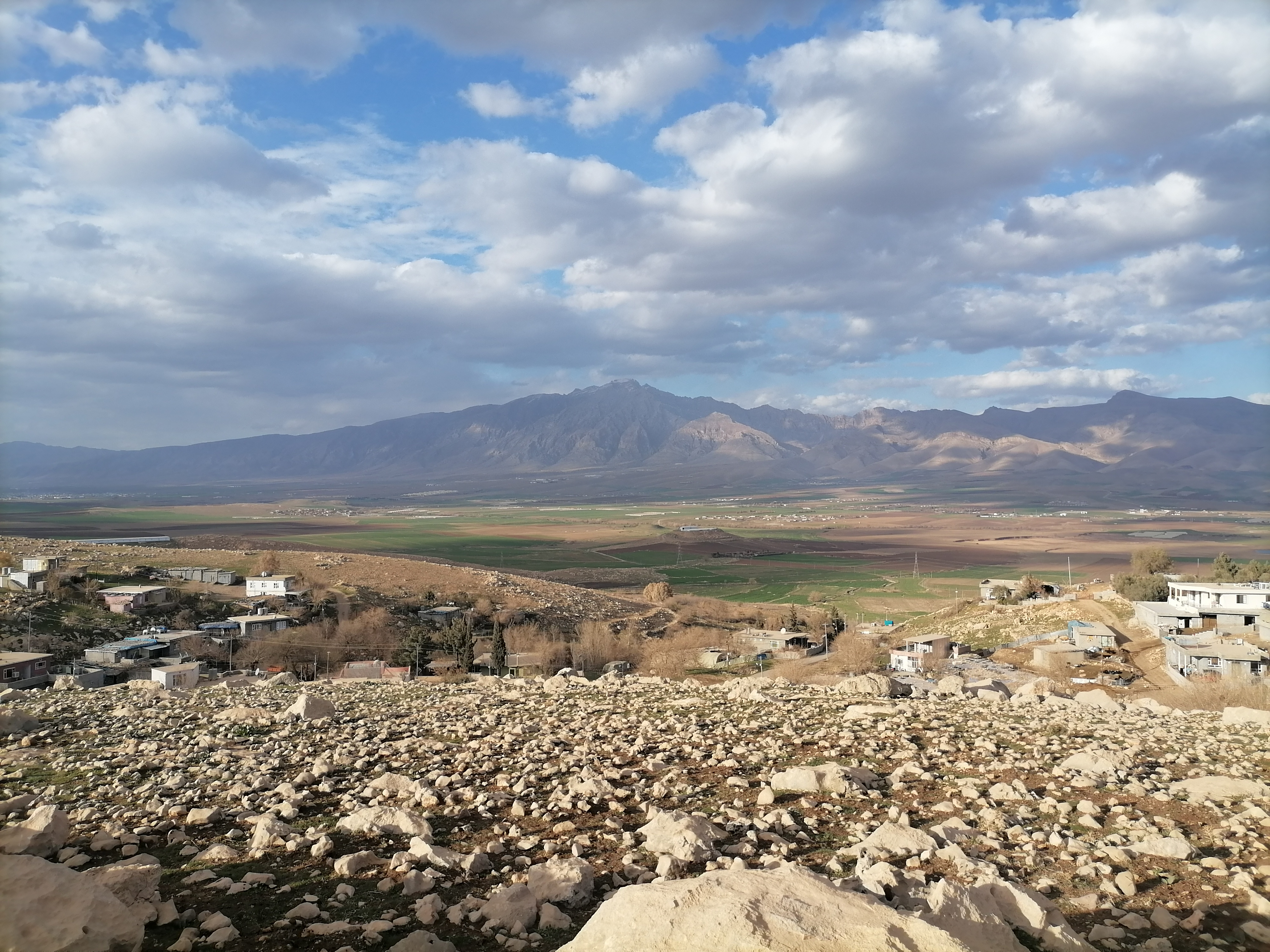

- Location within Iran
- Coordinates: 31°18′28″N 54°05′05″E
- Country: Iran
- Province: Yazd
- County: Taft
- District: Garizat

Population (2016)
  - Total: 718
- Time zone: UTC+3:30 (IRST)

Bakh (Persian: بخ) is a city in, and the capital of, Garizat District of Taft County, Yazd province, Iran. It also serves as the administrative center for Garizat Rural District. (Note: Formerly Ernan Rural District)

== Demographics ==
=== Population ===
At the time of the 2006 National Census, Bakh's population was 779 in 215 households, when it was a village in Garizat Rural District of Nir District. The following census in 2011 counted 1,067 people in 310 households, by which time the rural district had been separated from the district in the formation of Garizat District. The 2016 census measured the population of the village as 718 people in 224 households. It was the most populous village in its rural district.

After the census, the village of Bakh was elevated to the status of a city.
