= Chenar, Isfahan =

Village in Isfahan province, Iran

Chenar Persian: چنار
- Village
- Location within Iran
- Coordinates: 34°02′35″N 51°07′45″E
- Country: Iran
- Province: Isfahan
- County: Kashan
- District: Neyasar
- Rural District: Neyasar

Population (2016)
  - Total: 171
- Time zone: UTC+3:30 (IRST)

Chenar (Persian: چنار) (Note: Also romanized as Chenār) is a village in Neyasar Rural District of Neyasar District in Kashan County, Isfahan province, Iran.

== Demographics ==
=== Population ===
At the time of the 2006 National Census, the village's population was 128 in 34 households. The following census in 2011 counted 69 people in 23 households. The 2016 census measured the population of the village as 171 people in 51 households.
