= Ormak, Isfahan =

Village in Isfahan province, Iran

Ormak Persian: ارمك
- Village
- Location within Iran
- Coordinates: 34°06′40″N 51°03′42″E
- Country: Iran
- Province: Isfahan
- County: Kashan
- District: Neyasar
- Rural District: Kuh Dasht

Population (2016)
  - Total: 449
- Time zone: UTC+3:30 (IRST)

Ormak (Persian: ارمك) (Note: Also romanized as Ārmak) is a village in, and the capital of, Kuh Dasht Rural District in Neyasar District of Kashan County, Isfahan province, Iran.

== Demographics ==
=== Population ===
At the time of the 2006 National Census, the village's population was 300 in 121 households. The following census in 2011 counted 302 people in 129 households. The 2016 census measured the population of the village as 449 people in 174 households.
