= Dizan =

Dizan (Persian: ديزان) may refer to:

- Dizicheh, a city in Isfahan Province, Iran
- Duzan, a village in Lorestan Province, Iran
- Dizan, Alborz, a village in Alborz Province, Iran
- Dizan, Qazvin, a village in Qazvin Province, Iran
- Dizan, Yazd, a village in Yazd Province, Iran
