= Qeh =

Village in Isfahan province, Iran

Qeh Persian: قه
- Village
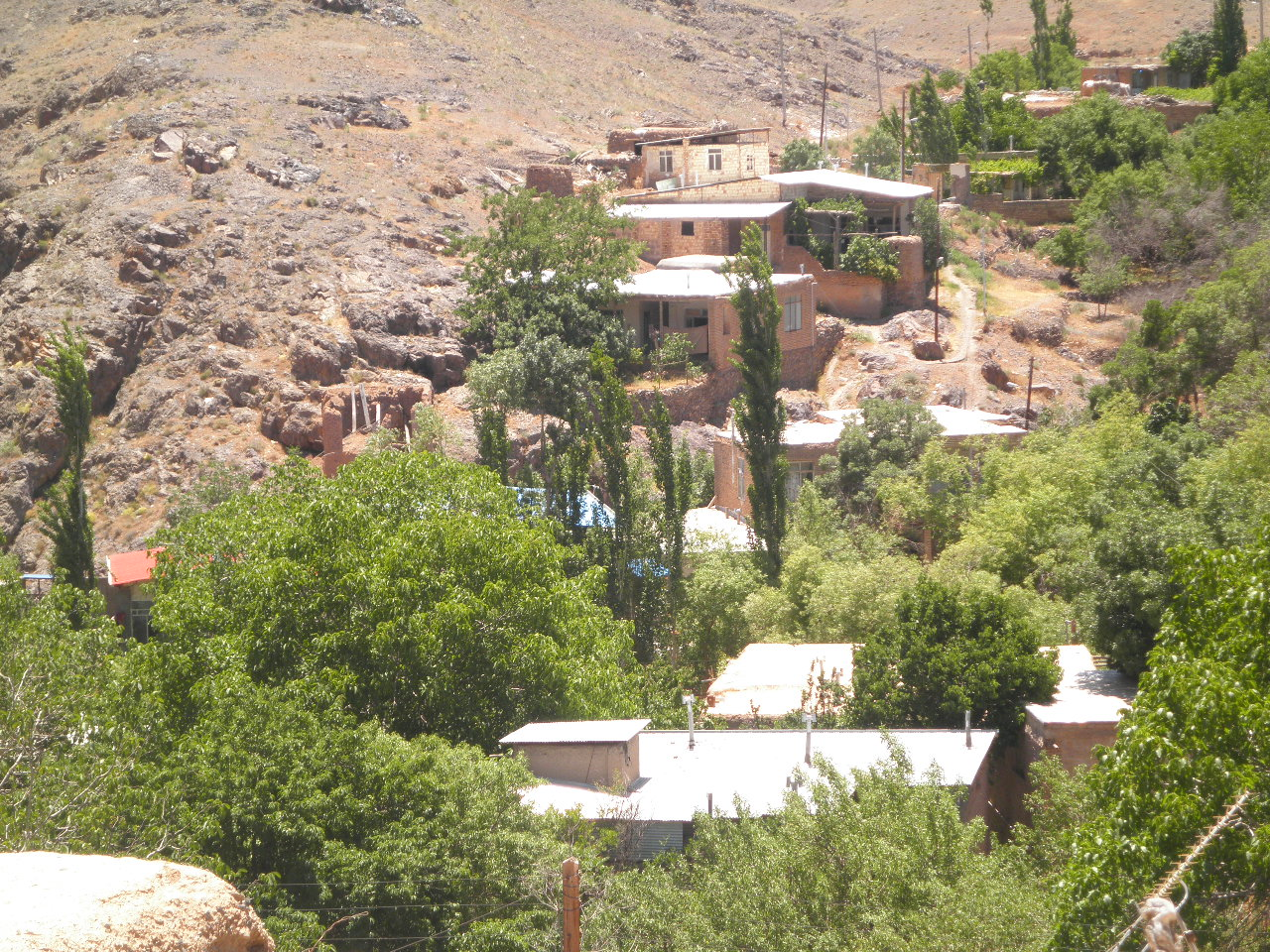
- The village of Qeh

- Location within Iran
- Coordinates: 34°07′54″N 51°09′00″E
- Country: Iran
- Province: Isfahan
- County: Kashan
- District: Neyasar
- Rural District: Kuh Dasht

Population (2016)
  - Total: 171
- Time zone: UTC+3:30 (IRST)

Qeh (Persian: قه) is a village in Kuh Dasht Rural District of Neyasar District in Kashan County, Isfahan province, Iran.

== Demographics ==
=== Population ===
At the time of the 2006 National Census, the village's population was 145 in 58 households. The following census in 2011 counted 108 people in 48 households. The 2016 census measured the population of the village as 171 people in 70 households.
