= Neshlaj =

Village in Isfahan province, Iran

Neshlaj Persian: نشلج
- Village
- Location within Iran
- Coordinates: 33°59′22″N 51°04′25″E
- Country: Iran
- Province: Isfahan
- County: Kashan
- District: Neyasar
- Rural District: Neyasar

Population (2016)
  - Total: 3,024
- Time zone: UTC+3:30 (IRST)

Neshlaj (Persian: نشلج) (Note: Also romanized as Nashlaj, Nashalj; also known as Nishlak) is a village in Neyasar Rural District of Neyasar District in Kashan County, Isfahan province, Iran.

== Etymology ==
Folk etymology derives the name Neshlaj from the phrase Noh-salj (نثلج), meaning "nine-snow" and interpreted to mean that there are nine months of snow each year in the village. A more probable origin, according to Habib Borjian, is a derivation from a prefix, either *ni- ("down") or *niš- ("out"), attached to a root such as *rak ("arrange"), referring to the prominent ridges and gorges around the village.

== Demographics ==
=== Population ===
At the time of the 2006 National Census, the village's population was 2,168 in 663 households. The following census in 2011 counted 2,142 people in 704 households. The 2016 census measured the population of the village as 3,024 people in 978 households, the most populous in its rural district.

== Geography ==
=== Location ===
The village is 43 km northwest of Kashan, the natural beauties of the village, along with its high security against the attack of thieves, attracted people to this area, Mehr News Agency reported.

=== Hydrology ===
There are five water reservoirs in the village, the historical precedence of some dates back to the Safavid era.

== Agriculture ==
Due to the village's geographical position (suitable soil, water and weather), farmers are active in the field of horticulture. Given the average rainfall of 200 mm per year, the village is a suitable place for growing sweet-scented Mohammadi rose. The village is famous for its rosewater.

== Culture ==
=== Literature ===
Poetry written by Bahram Nashalji about 700 years ago shows that the culture of friendship prevailed in the village.

=== Architecture ===
The village is located on the northern slope and has beautiful buildings in terms of texture and architectural style. The ceiling of each house is the courtyard of another house.

Buildings in the village reveal that its residents made optimum use of climatic and geographical conditions. The presence of two bathhouses in the village indicates the attention of residents toward health and cleanliness. Water canals exceeding 2,500 meters hint at the firm will of the people to live in the village.

== Tourism ==
Neshlaj is one of the tourism attractions of Kashan which, due to its unique texture, mild climatic conditions, snowy winter and cool summers, shines like a jewel.
