= List of members in the Fourth Term of the Assembly of Experts =

The List of members from the fourth term of the Assembly of Experts. (Persian: فهرست نمایندگان دوره چهارم مجلس خبرگان رهبری, romanized: Fehreste nâmâyandegân dore chahârom majles-e khobregân-e rahbari) consists of names of the members during the fourth term of the Assembly of Experts from 2006 to 2016. Elections for the Assembly of Experts occurs every 8 years. However, for the fourth term it was 10 years because the elections that took place for the fifth term was planned for 2014 but was postponed to 2016 in order to be held alongside the 2016 Iranian legislative election.

"Assembly of experts (of the Leadership)", or the "Council of Experts" is the deliberative body empowered to appoint and dismiss the Supreme Leader of Iran; and Seyyed Ali Khamenei is the current supreme leader of Iran. Ali Khamenei was the Leader during this term.

The elections took place on 15 December 2006, with the Inauguration occurring on 20 February 2007.

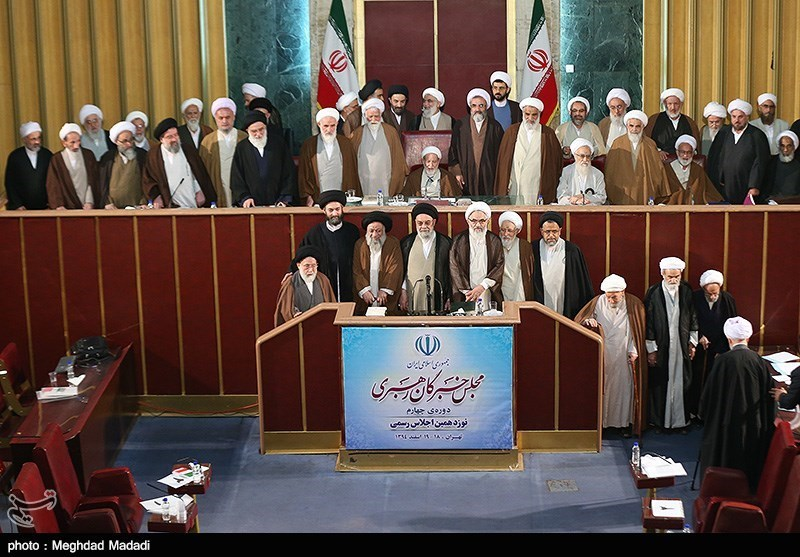
The elected officials for the fourth term of the Assembly of Experts.

== Members ==
The list is ordered Alphabetically.

Members with * next to their name, indicates they died while in office.

- Ardabil
1. Hassan Ameli
2. Mir Ebrahim Seyyed Hatami
- Bushehr
1. Hashem Hosseini Bushehri
- Chaharmahal and Bakhtiari
1. Alireza Eslamian
- East Azerbaijan
1. Hashem Hashemzadeh Herisi (Replaced Morteza Bani Fazel)
2. Mohammad Feyz Sarabi
3. Mohammad Taghi Pourmohammadi
4. Mohammad Vaez Mousavi
5. Mohsen Mojtahed Shabestari
6. Morteza Bani Fazel – (مرتضی بنی فضل) * (27 May 2010)
- Fars
1. Ahmad Beheshti
2. Ali Mohammad Dastgheib Shirazi
3. Assad-Allah Imani
4. Mahialdin Haeri Shirazi
5. Seyed Ali Asghar Dastgheib
- Gilan
1. Abbas Mahfouzi
2. Mokhtar Aminian * (10 June 2015)
3. Reza Ramezani Gilani
4. Zaynolabideen Ghorbani
- Golestan
1. Habibollah Taheri Gorgani – (حبیب‌الله طاهری گرگانی) * (29 December 2007)
2. Seyed Abdol Hadi Hosseini Shahroudi (Replaced Habibollah Taheri Gorgani)
3. Seyed Kazem Noor Mofidi
- Hamadan
1. Ali Razini
2. Ghiaseddin Taha Mohammadi
- Hormozgan
1. Gholam Ali Naim Abadi
- Ilam
1. Seyed Mojtaba Taheri – (سید مجتبی طاهری)
- Isfahan
1. Abdol Mohammad Abdolahi
2. Hassan Shariati Niyasar
3. Morteza Moghtadai
4. Seyed Abolhasan Mahdavi
5. Yousef Tabatabai Nejad
- Kerman
1. Ahmad Khatami
2. Ali Movahedi-Kermani
3. Mohammad Bahrami Khoshkar
- Kermanshah
1. Hassan Mamduhi
2. Mohammad Hossein Zarandi * (27 May 2014)
- Khuzestan
1. Abbas Ka'bi
2. Ali Fallahian
3. Mohammad Ali Mousavi Jazayeri
4. Mohammad Hossein Ahmadi Shahroudi
5. Mohsen Heidari Alekasir
6. Seyyed Ali Shafiei
- Kohgiluyeh and Boyer-Ahmad
1. Seyed Karamatollah Malek-Hosseini * (2 November 2012)
2. Seyed Sharaf Aldin Malek Hosseini (Replaced Seyed Karamatollah Malek-Hosseini)
- Kurdistan
1. Abdol Rahman Khodai
2. Hesam Aldin Mojtahedi (Replaced Mohammad Seikh Al-Eslami)
3. Mohammad Sheikh Al-Eslami * (17 September 2009)
- Lorestan
1. Seyed Hassan Taheri Khoramabadi * (7 September 2014)
2. Seyed Mohammad Naghi Shahrokhi Khoramabadi
- Markazi
1. Ahmad Mohseni Garakani
2. Seyed Abolfazel Mir Mohammadi
- Mazandaran
1. Ali Moalemi
2. Norallah Tabresi
3. Seyed Saber Jabbari * (31 August 2014)
4. Sadeq Larijani
- North Khorasan
1. Habibollah Mehman Navaz
- Qazvin
1. Ali Eslami (cleric)
2. Hadi Barikbin
- Qom
1. Mohammad Momen
- Razavi Khorasan
1. Abbas Vaez-Tabasi * (4 March 2016)
2. Abolghasem Khazali * (16 September 2015)
3. Ahmad Alamolhoda
4. Ali Asghar Masoumi Shahroudi
5. Hassan Alemi (Replaced Mohammad Reza Faker)
6. Mahmoud Hashemi Shahroudi
7. Mohammad Reza Faker * (10 February 2010)
- Semnan
1. Seyed Mohammad Shahcheraghi
- Sistan and Baluchestan
1. Abbas-Ali Soleimani
2. Ali Ahmad Salami
- South Khorasan
1. Ebrahim Raisi
- Tehran
1. Abdul-Nabi Namazi
2. Ahmad Jannati
3. Akbar Hashemi Rafsanjani
4. Ali Meshkini * (30 July 2007)
5. Ghorbanali Dorri-Najafabadi
6. Hassan Rouhani
7. Mahmoud Alavi (Replaced Seyed Mohammad Hassan Marashi)
8. Mohammad Bagher Bagheri Kani
9. Mohammed Emami-Kashani
10. Mohammad Mohammadi Gilani * (9 July 2014)
11. Mohammad-Reza Mahdavi Kani (Replaced Ali Meshkini) * (21 October 2014)
12. Mohammad-Taqi Mesbah-Yazdi
13. Mohammad Yazdi
14. Mohsen Kazeroni
15. Mohsen Kharazi
16. Mohsen Qomi
17. Reza Ostadi
18. Seyed Mohammad Hassan Marashi * (18 August 2008)
- West Azerbaijan
1. Asghar Dirbaz (Replaced Mir Akbar Ghaffar Gharabakh)
2. Ali Akbar Ghoreishi
3. Hassan Namazi
4. Mir Akbar Ghaffar Gharabakh * (27 March 2012)
- Yazd
1. Abolghasem Wafi Yazdi
- Zanjan
1. Mohammad Taghi Vaezi

== See also ==
- 2006 Iranian Assembly of Experts election
- Results of the 2006 Iranian Assembly of Experts election
- Assembly of Experts
- List of members in the First Term of the Council of Experts
- List of members in the Second Term of the Council of Experts
- List of members in the Third Term of the Council of Experts
- List of members in the Fifth Term of the Council of Experts
- List of members in the Sixth Term of the Council of Experts
- List of chairmen of the Assembly of Experts
