= Alavi, Isfahan =

Village in Isfahan province, Iran

Alavi Persian: علوي
- Village
- Location within Iran
- Coordinates: 34°02′28″N 51°04′30″E
- Country: Iran
- Province: Isfahan
- County: Kashan
- District: Neyasar
- Rural District: Neyasar

Population (2016)
  - Total: 639
- Time zone: UTC+3:30 (IRST)

Alavi (Persian: علوي) (Note: Also romanized as ‘Alavī) is a village in Neyasar Rural District of Neyasar District in Kashan County, Isfahan province, Iran.

The main products of Alavi are roses, rose water, saffron and high-quality herbal spirits.

== Demographics ==
=== Population ===
At the time of the 2006 National Census, the village's population was 658 in 183 households. The following census in 2011 counted 651 people in 201 households. The 2016 census measured the population of the village as 639 people in 199 households.
