= Jowzestan =

Jowzestan (Persian: جوزستان) may refer to:

- Jowzestan, Chaharmahal and Bakhtiari
- Jowzestan, Yazd
