= Sar, Isfahan =

Village in Isfahan province, Iran

Sar Persian: سار
- Village
- Location within Iran
- Coordinates: 34°09′27″N 51°06′18″E
- Country: Iran
- Province: Isfahan
- County: Kashan
- District: Neyasar
- Rural District: Kuh Dasht

Population (2016)
  - Total: 370
- Time zone: UTC+3:30 (IRST)

Sar (Persian: سار) (Note: Also romanized as Sār) is a village in Kuh Dasht Rural District of Neyasar District in Kashan County, Isfahan province, Iran.

== Demographics ==
=== Population ===
At the time of the 2006 National Census, the village's population was 147 in 61 households. The following census in 2011 counted 181 people in 87 households. The 2016 census measured the population of the village as 370 people in 132 households.
