= Mashhad Ardehal =

City in Isfahan province, Iran

Mashhad Ardehal مشهد اردهال
- Village
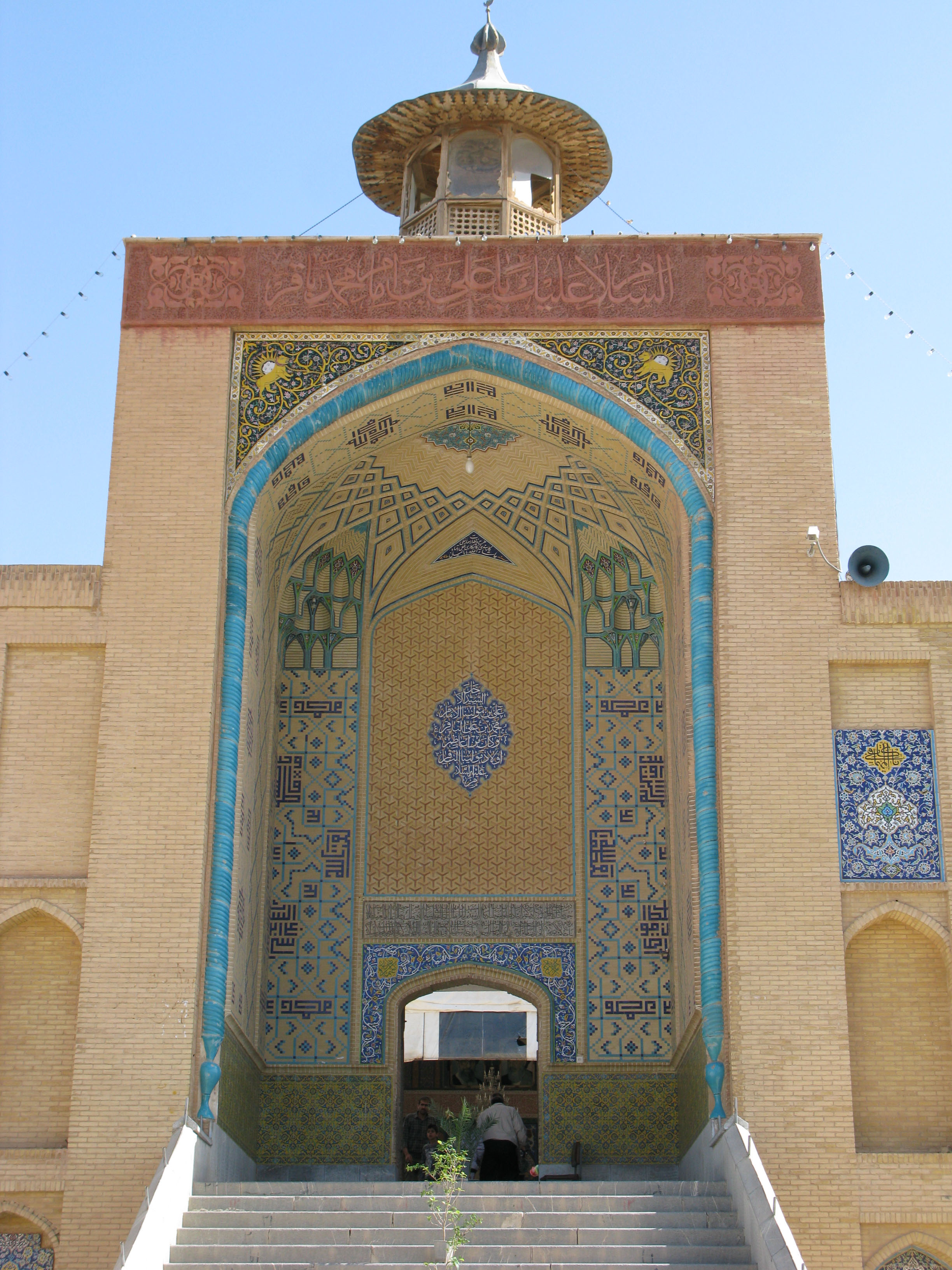

- Location within Iran
- Coordinates: 34°02′21″N 51°03′05″E
- Country: Iran
- Province: Isfahan
- County: Kashan
- Bakhsh: Neyasar
- Rural District: Neyasar

Population (2006)
  - Total: c. 2,000
- Time zone: UTC+3:30 (IRST)
  - Summer (DST): UTC+4:30 (IRDT)

Mashhad Ardehal (Persian: مشهد اردهال, also Romanized as Mashhad Ārdahāl and Mashhad Ardahal) is a city in Neyasar Rural District, Neyasar District, Kashan County, Isfahan Province, Iran. The population in 2017 is approximately 2,000 people.

It is located 40–45 km west of the city of Kashan, in the eastern domain of mount Ardehal of Kashan, the highest peak of west of Kashan. The city contains the burial site of Sultan Ali (the son of the fifth Imam Muhammad al-Baqir) and the notable modern Persian poet and painter Sohrab Sepehri and is known for its annual Carpet Washing Ceremony. The tomb of Sohrab Sepehri is located in the eastern wing of the Shrine of Sultan Ali, which lies on the slope of a high hill. The shrine has two magnificent courtyards, a couple of splendid balconies and tall minarets decorated with ceramic tiles. The whole building complex belongs to the Seljuk era architecture.

== Carpet Washing Ceremony ==
The Carpet Washing (Ghali-Shuyan) Ceremony, one of the most interesting religious ceremonies of the Shiites, is held in Mashhad Ardehal. It is a traditional/religious/historical mourning ceremony.

The origin of the ceremony can be traced back to the time when Sultan Ali (who was invited from Medina to Mashhad Ardehal more than 12 centuries ago) was killed in the city by his enemies. After his followers from the area arrived too late to help him they wrapped his body in a carpet. They then washed his body in a stream 150 meters away, before burying him. So for hundreds of years people in their thousands from the surrounding area and beyond (including Qom, Kashan, Nashlaj, Khomein, Mahallat, Saveh, Delijan, Golpayegan, Yazd, and many other towns) have flocked to Mashhad Ardehal to mourn and represent this event each year on the second Friday of the Iranian month of Mehr (early October), since this was the day Sultan Ali was killed. Some pilgrims even walk to the shrine from places that are large distances away. The crowd of pilgrims then leave the shrine carrying the remains of the same sacred carpet (that was used to wrap the body of Sultan Ali) on their shoulders, and while mourning, symbolically beat the remains of the carpet with long sticks to show their hatred towards the enemies of Sultan Ali and to demand revenge for his martyrdom, and also as a means to clean the carpet. Throughout the ceremony no outsider is allowed to touch the remains of the carpet. The pilgrims wear black clothes, sing religious songs, cry and beat their chests (as a sign of grief and mourning) and rotate their sticks in the air and rotate the carpet around the yard of the shrine. They then wash the carpet in a special stream of water near the shrine. The people believe the water then becomes holy, with many pilgrims applying the stream water upon their bodies and also bottling the water to take home with them. The pilgrims then return the carpet back to the shrine and the mourning ends at noon with a giant feast, where thousands are fed for free, before finally returning to their homes.

In 2009, there were 200,000 pilgrims gathered in Mashhad Ardehal for the Carpet Washing Ceremony.

== See also ==
- Mourning of Muharram
