= Farahabad, Kashan =

Village in Isfahan province, Iran

Farahabad Persian: فرح اباد
- Village
- Location within Iran
- Coordinates: 34°04′12″N 51°08′24″E
- Country: Iran
- Province: Isfahan
- County: Kashan
- District: Neyasar
- Rural District: Kuh Dasht

Population (2016)
  - Total: 15
- Time zone: UTC+3:30 (IRST)

Farahabad (Persian: فرح اباد) (Note: Also romanized as Faraḩābād) is a village in Kuh Dasht Rural District of Neyasar District in Kashan County, Isfahan province, Iran.

== Demographics ==
=== Population ===
At the time of the 2006 National Census, the village's population was 13 in four households. The following census in 2011 counted a population below the reporting threshold. The 2016 census measured the population of the village as 15 people in five households.
