= Aznaveh =

Village in Isfahan province, Iran

Aznaveh Persian: ازناوه
- Village
- Location within Iran
- Coordinates: 34°05′51″N 51°00′46″E
- Country: Iran
- Province: Isfahan
- County: Kashan
- District: Neyasar
- Rural District: Kuh Dasht

Population (2016)
  - Total: 169
- Time zone: UTC+3:30 (IRST)

Aznaveh (Persian: ازناوه) (Note: Also romanized as Aznāveh and Eznāveh) is a village in Kuh Dasht Rural District of Neyasar District in Kashan County, Isfahan province, Iran.

== Demographics ==
=== Population ===
At the time of the 2006 National Census, the village's population was 179 in 79 households. The following census in 2011 counted 141 people in 70 households. The 2016 census measured the population of the village as 169 people in 81 households.
