= Pahlavan Badi Castle =

Castle in Yazd Province, Iran

Pahlavan Badi castle
- قلعه پهلوان بادی

General information
- Type: Castle
- Location: Taft County, Iran

Pahlavan Badi castle (Persian: قلعه پهلوان بادی) is a historical castle located in Taft County in Yazd Province, The longevity of this fortress dates back to the Ancient Persia.
