= Vadeqan =

Village in Isfahan province, Iran

Vadeqan Persian: وادقان
- Village
- Location within Iran
- Coordinates: 34°09′07″N 51°04′55″E
- Country: Iran
- Province: Isfahan
- County: Kashan
- District: Neyasar
- Rural District: Kuh Dasht

Population (2016)
  - Total: 544
- Time zone: UTC+3:30 (IRST)

Vadeqan (Persian: وادقان) (Note: Also romanized as Vādeqān; also known as Bādgān and Bādqūn) is a village in Kuh Dasht Rural District of Neyasar District in Kashan County, Isfahan province, Iran.

== Demographics ==
=== Population ===
At the time of the 2006 National Census, the village's population was 290 in 122 households. The following census in 2011 counted 377 people in 167 households. The 2016 census measured the population of the village as 544 people in 211 households.
