= Rahaq =

Village in Isfahan province, Iran

Rahaq Persian: رحق
- Village
- Location within Iran
- Coordinates: 34°08′22″N 50°59′55″E
- Country: Iran
- Province: Isfahan
- County: Kashan
- District: Neyasar
- Rural District: Kuh Dasht

Population (2016)
  - Total: 454
- Time zone: UTC+3:30 (IRST)

Rahaq (Persian: رحق) (Note: Also romanized as Raḩaq) is a village in Kuh Dasht Rural District of Neyasar District in Kashan County, Isfahan province, Iran.

== Demographics ==
=== Population ===
At the time of the 2006 National Census, the village's population was 536 in 210 households. The following census in 2011 counted 454 people in 198 households. The 2016 census measured the population of the village as 454 people in 187 households.
