= Van, Iran =

Village in Isfahan province, Iran

Van Persian: ون
- Village
- Location within Iran
- Coordinates: 34°09′40″N 51°03′00″E
- Country: Iran
- Province: Isfahan
- County: Kashan
- District: Neyasar
- Rural District: Kuh Dasht

Population (2016)
  - Total: 256
- Time zone: UTC+3:30 (IRST)

Van (Persian: ون) is a village in Kuh Dasht Rural District of Neyasar District in Kashan County, Isfahan province, Iran.

== Demographics ==
=== Population ===
At the time of the 2006 National Census, the village's population was 170 in 66 households. The following census in 2011 counted 169 people in 76 households. The 2016 census measured the population of the village as 256 people in 102 households.
