= Hasnarud =

Village in Isfahan province, Iran

Hasnarud Persian: حسنارود
- Village
- Location within Iran
- Coordinates: 34°02′34″N 51°06′02″E
- Country: Iran
- Province: Isfahan
- County: Kashan
- District: Neyasar
- Rural District: Neyasar

Population (2016)
  - Total: 560
- Time zone: UTC+3:30 (IRST)

Hasnarud (Persian: حسنارود) (Note: Also romanized as Ḩasanā Rūd, Ḩasnā Rūd, Ḩasnārūd, and Ḩosnārūd; also known as Hasanrūd) is a village in Neyasar Rural District of Neyasar District in Kashan County, Isfahan province, Iran.

== Demographics ==
=== Population ===
At the time of the 2006 National Census, the village's population was 582 in 172 households. The following census in 2011 counted 559 people in 181 households. The 2016 census measured the population of the village as 560 people in 189 households.
