= Tudeh, Iran =

Tudeh (Persian: توده) in Iran may refer to:

- Tudeh, North Khorasan
- Tudeh, Nir, Taft County, Yazd Province
