= Eshaqabad, Isfahan =

Village in Isfahan province, Iran

Eshaqabad Persian: اسحق اباد
- Village
- Location within Iran
- Coordinates: 33°56′34″N 51°09′04″E
- Country: Iran
- Province: Isfahan
- County: Kashan
- District: Neyasar
- Rural District: Neyasar

Population (2016)
  - Total: 234
- Time zone: UTC+3:30 (IRST)

Eshaqabad (Persian: اسحق اباد) (Note: Also romanized as Esḩāqābād) is a village in Neyasar Rural District of Neyasar District in Kashan County, Isfahan province, Iran.

== Demographics ==
=== Population ===
At the time of the 2006 National Census, the village's population was 303 in 93 households. The following census in 2011 counted 180 people in 65 households. The 2016 census measured the population of the village as 234 people in 85 households.
