= Kalleh, Isfahan =

Village in Isfahan province, Iran

Kalleh Persian: كله
- Village
- Location within Iran
- Coordinates: 34°05′26″N 51°06′07″E
- Country: Iran
- Province: Isfahan
- County: Kashan
- District: Neyasar
- Rural District: Kuh Dasht

Population (2016)
  - Total: 765
- Time zone: UTC+3:30 (IRST)

Kalleh (Persian: كله) is a village in Kuh Dasht Rural District of Neyasar District in Kashan County, Isfahan province, Iran.

== Demographics ==
=== Population ===
At the time of the 2006 National Census, the village's population was 280 in 97 households. The following census in 2011 counted 462 people in 164 households. The 2016 census measured the population of the village as 765 people in 274 households. It was the most populous village in its rural district.
