= Hadi Khani =

Hadi Khani (Persian: هادي خاني) may refer to:

- Hadi Khani, Khuzestan
- Hadi Khani, Yazd
