= Bari Karsaf =

Village in Isfahan province, Iran

Bari Karsaf Persian: باري كرسف
- Village
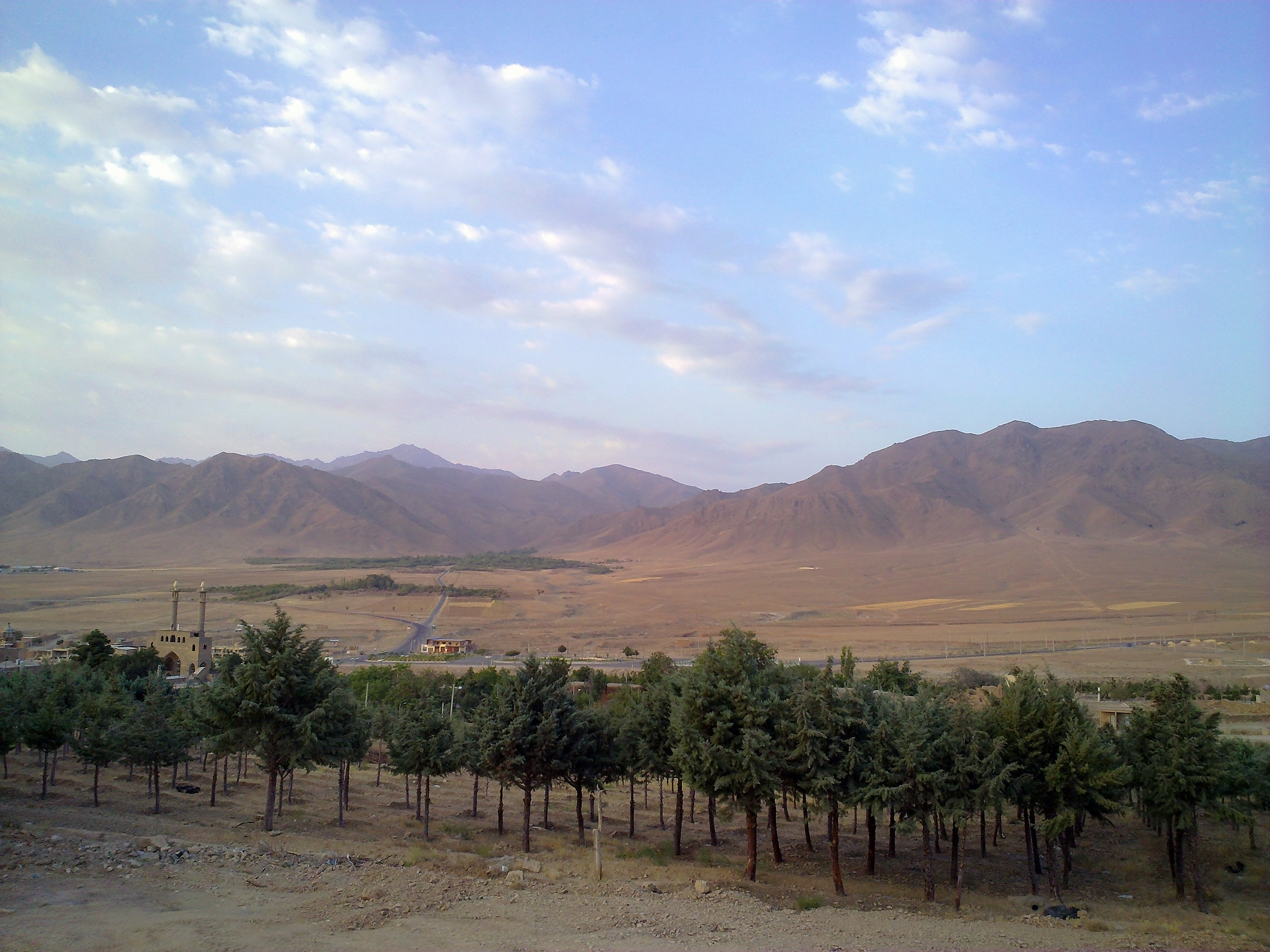
- Landscape near the village of Bari Karsaf

- Location within Iran
- Coordinates: 34°02′11″N 51°03′16″E
- Country: Iran
- Province: Isfahan
- County: Kashan
- District: Neyasar
- Rural District: Neyasar

Population (2016)
  - Total: 555
- Time zone: UTC+3:30 (IRST)

Bari Karsaf (Persian: باري كرسف) (Note: Also romanized as Bārī Karsaf and Bārīkarsaf; also known as Bārī Karafs) is a village in Neyasar Rural District of Neyasar District in Kashan County, Isfahan province, Iran.

== Demographics ==
=== Population ===
At the time of the 2006 National Census, the village's population was 360 in 103 households. The following census in 2011 counted 265 people in 86 households. The 2016 census measured the population of the village as 555 people in 189 households.
