= Hassan Shariati Niyasar =

Iranian Ayatollah

Ayatollah Sheikh Hassan Shariati Niyasar
- آیت الله شیخ حسن شریعتی نیاسر
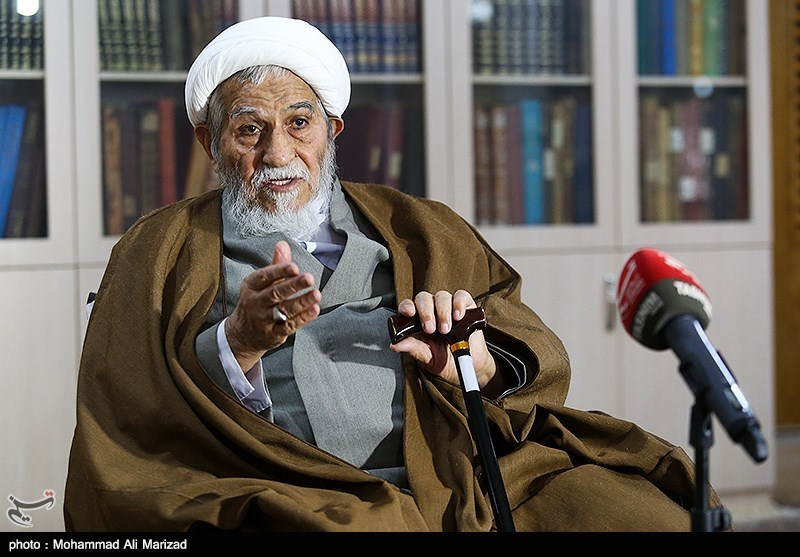
- Ayatollah Hassan Shariati Niyasar, 2019.

Member of the Fourth term of the Assembly of Experts
- In office 20 February 2007 – 24 May 2016
- Constituency: Isfahan Province
- Title: Ayatollah

Personal life
- Born: Hassan Shariati; 21 March 1933 (age 93) Neyasar, Imperial State of Persia
- Education: Qom Hawza
- Relatives: Mojtaba Shariati Niyasar nephew

Religious life
- Religion: Islam
- Sect: Shia
- Jurisprudence: Twelver, Jaffari

Hassan Shariati Niyasar (Persian: حسن شریعتی نیاسر) is an Iranian scholar and Ayatollah. He was a member of the Assembly of Experts, and represented the people of Isfahan province for the fourth term. However, he failed gaining a seat on the Assembly for the fifth term.

== Early life and education ==
Niyasar was born in Neyasar, a city in Isfahan province. His family was religious, as his father and paternal grandfather were scholars in the region. He is also a descendant of Ahmad Naraghi and Mirzai Qomi from his mother's side. As a child he attended the Gozar Baba Vali school in Kashan, and then left to Arak to begin his introductory classes in Islamic studies.

Upon completing his beginner-level classes in Arak, Niyasar then left for Qom to attend the Qom Seminary to further his Islamic studies. He took advanced classes here, where he completed his Darse Kharij level (Advanced level Islamic studies). During his time in Qom, he attended classes from several prominent scholars. Such scholars were the likes of Musa al-Sadr, Mohammad Sadouqi, Morteza Motahari, Lakani Rashti, Mirza Javad Tabrizi, Ali Meshkini, and Sheikh Abdol Javad Sadhi Jabal Amal. He took Fiqh classes from Ruhollah Khomeini, Mohammad Taghi Borujerdi, Morteza Haeri Yazdi, and Mirza Abulfazl Zahedi. He took Islamic philosophy and Quranic exegesis classes from Mohammad Hossein Tabatabai. Also while in Qom, he completed intermediate (sath) and advanced (dars kharij) studies in fiqh, usul al-fiqh, and hadith, training in textual analysis and legal reasoning toward ijtihad. He also traveled to Mashhad to study there for a short time under Sheikh Hashem Qazvini, and also Najaf under Mohammad Hadi al-Milani.

== Responsibilities ==
Some of his responsibilities:

- Inspection and supervision of judicial & law enforcement affairs.
- Responsible for taking exams from the students and graduates of the seminary (higher level & Darse Kharij)
- Head of a branch in the Supreme Court
- Teaching higher levels in the holy seminary of Qom
- Member of the Assembly of Experts for the fourth term, representing Isfahan Province

== Works ==
Some of his works:

- Commentary on the discussion of Ayatollah Hakim's prayer
- Commentary on the Usul Fiqh by Ayatollah Allameh Isfahani
- Commentary on Khomeini's lessons
- Commentary on Musnad al-Shia, by Mullah Ahmad Naraqi
- Commentary on a part of the Tahrir al-Wasila, by Khomeini.
- A practical guide on the Hajj rituals

== See also ==
- List of Ayatollahs
- List of members in the Fourth Term of the Council of Experts
- Shia clergy
