= Hassan Namazi =

Iranian Shiite cleric and politician

- حسن نمازی
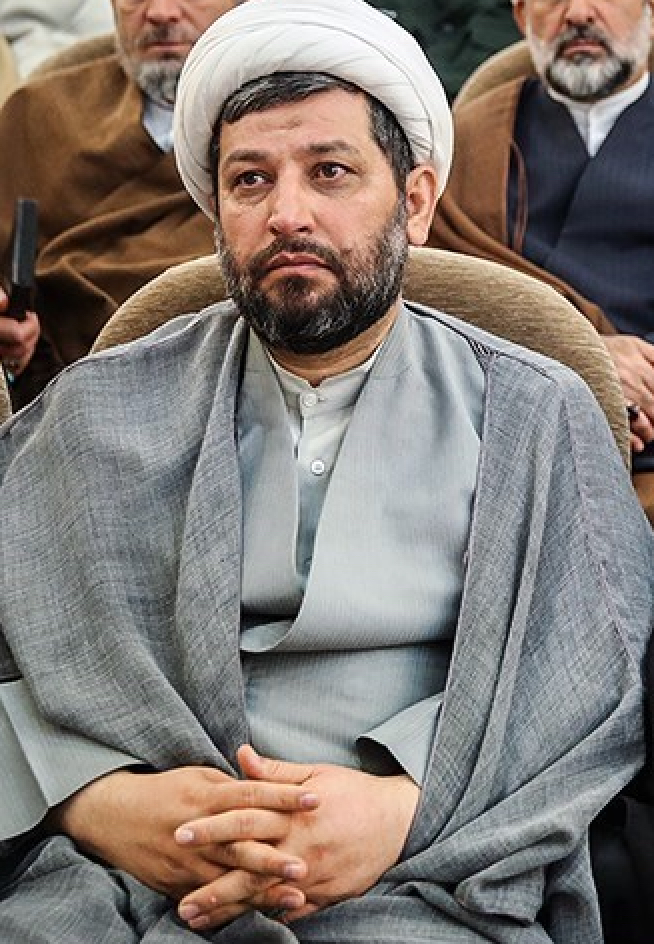

Member of Assembly of Experts
- In office December 15, 2006 – September 2, 2015
- Preceded by: Seyed Mohsen Mousavi Tabrizi
- Succeeded by: Javad Mojtahed Shabestari
- Constituency: West Azerbaijan

Personal details
- Born: 1975 Qom, Iran
- Education: Qom Hawza

Hassan Namazi (Persian: حسن نمازی, born in Qum from Azeri parents) is an Iranian Shiite cleric and politician. He is a member of the 4th Assembly of Experts from the West Azerbaijan electorate. Namazi won his membership with 360,952 votes.

== See also ==
- List of members in the Fourth Term of the Council of Experts
