= Nir, Yazd =

City in Iran

Nir Persian: نير
- City
- Location within Iran
- Coordinates: 31°28′47″N 54°07′21″E
- Country: Iran
- Province: Yazd
- County: Taft
- District: Nir

Population (2016)
  - Total: 1,740
- Time zone: UTC+3:30 (IRST)

Nir (Persian: نير) (Note: Also romanized as Nīr; also known as Nīleh) is a city in, and the capital of, Nir District of Taft County, Yazd province, Iran.

== Demographics ==
=== Population ===
At the time of the 2006 National Census, the city's population was 1,567 in 503 households. The following census in 2011 counted 1,620 people in 501 households. The 2016 census measured the population of the city as 1,740 people in 606 households.
