= Neyasar =

City in Isfahan province, Iran

Neyasar Persian: نياسر
- City
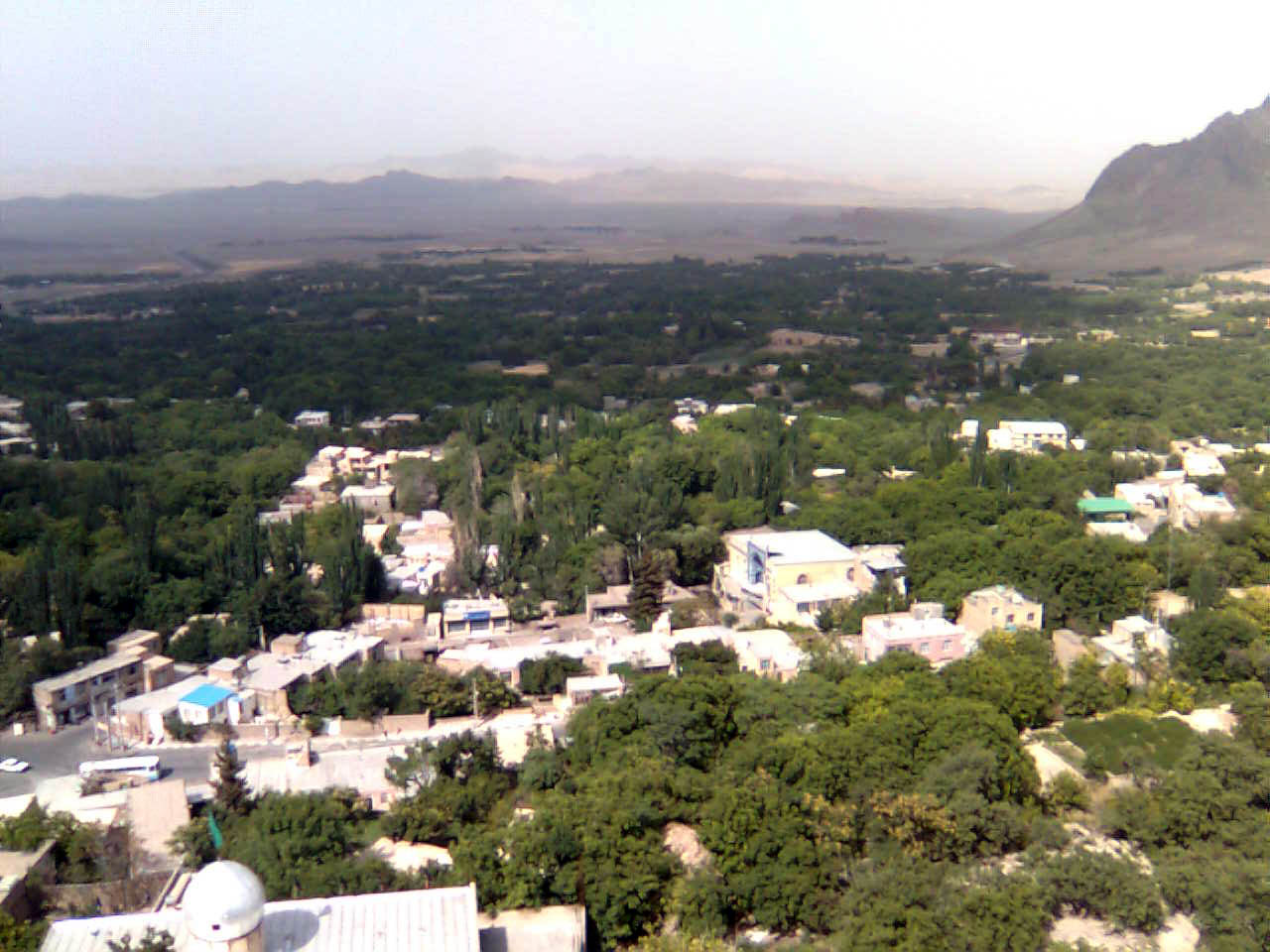
- City of Neyasar

- Location within Iran
- Coordinates: 33°58′21″N 51°08′55″E
- Country: Iran
- Province: Isfahan
- County: Kashan
- District: Neyasar
- Established as a city: 1997

Population (2016)
  - Total: 2,319
- Time zone: UTC+3:30 (IRST)
- Website: www.niasar.com/index.php

Neyasar (Persian: نياسر) (Note: Also romanized as Niāsar, Nīāsar, and Nīyā Sar; also known as Nezār) is a city in, and the capital of, Neyasar District of Kashan County, Isfahan province, Iran. It also serves as the administrative center for Neyasar Rural District. The village of Neyasar was converted to a city in 1997.

== Demographics ==
=== Language ===
It is a Persian-speaking town.

=== Population ===
At the time of the 2006 National Census, the city's population was 2,003 in 586 households. The following census in 2011 counted 2,171 people in 647 households. The 2016 census measured the population of the city as 2,319 people in 780 households.

== Geography ==
Neyasar is in the northwest of Kashan County in the province of Isfahan. It is a Garden City because it was a small village and now it has become a city with many gardens. Neyasar is famous for Flower-Water Festival. This Festival begin in second week of Ordibehesht (first of May). In this festival people install pots and mixed flowers and water and then turn fire under pot after 13 hours steam of water moved to another container and then moved to the rose bottle. Many people from all around of world and from Iran gathered in Neyasar to viewing this festival.

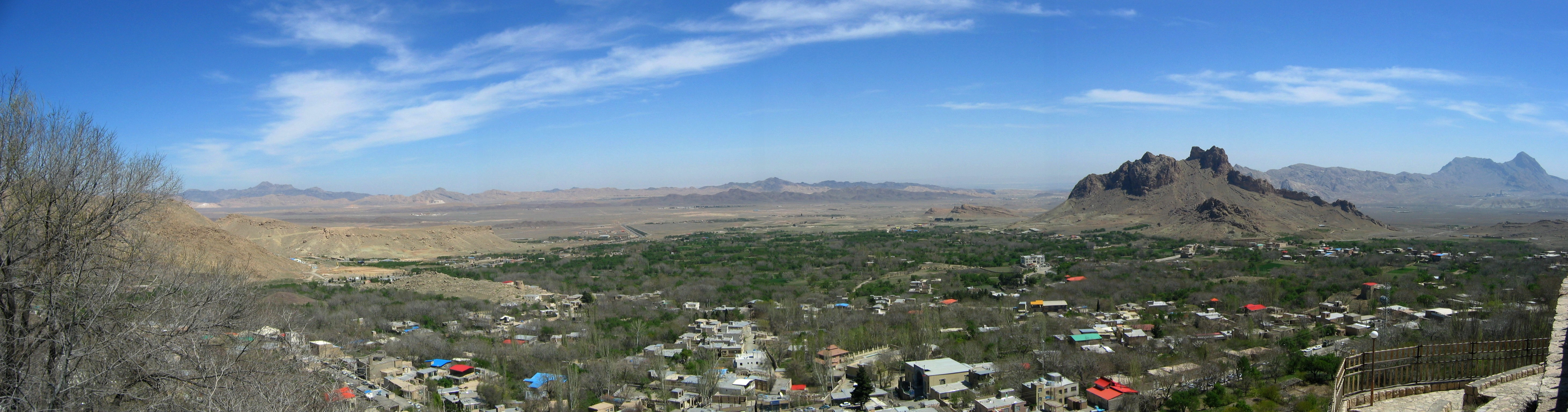
Landscape near the city of Neyasar

== Archaeology ==
Middle Paleolithic stone tools have been discovered in travertine deposits close to spring that date back to more than 40.000 years ago. Niasar Fire Temple is a structure with a dome, above the spring of Niasar Village. It is believed to have been built during the reign of Ardashir I, 224-242 CE.

== Gallery ==
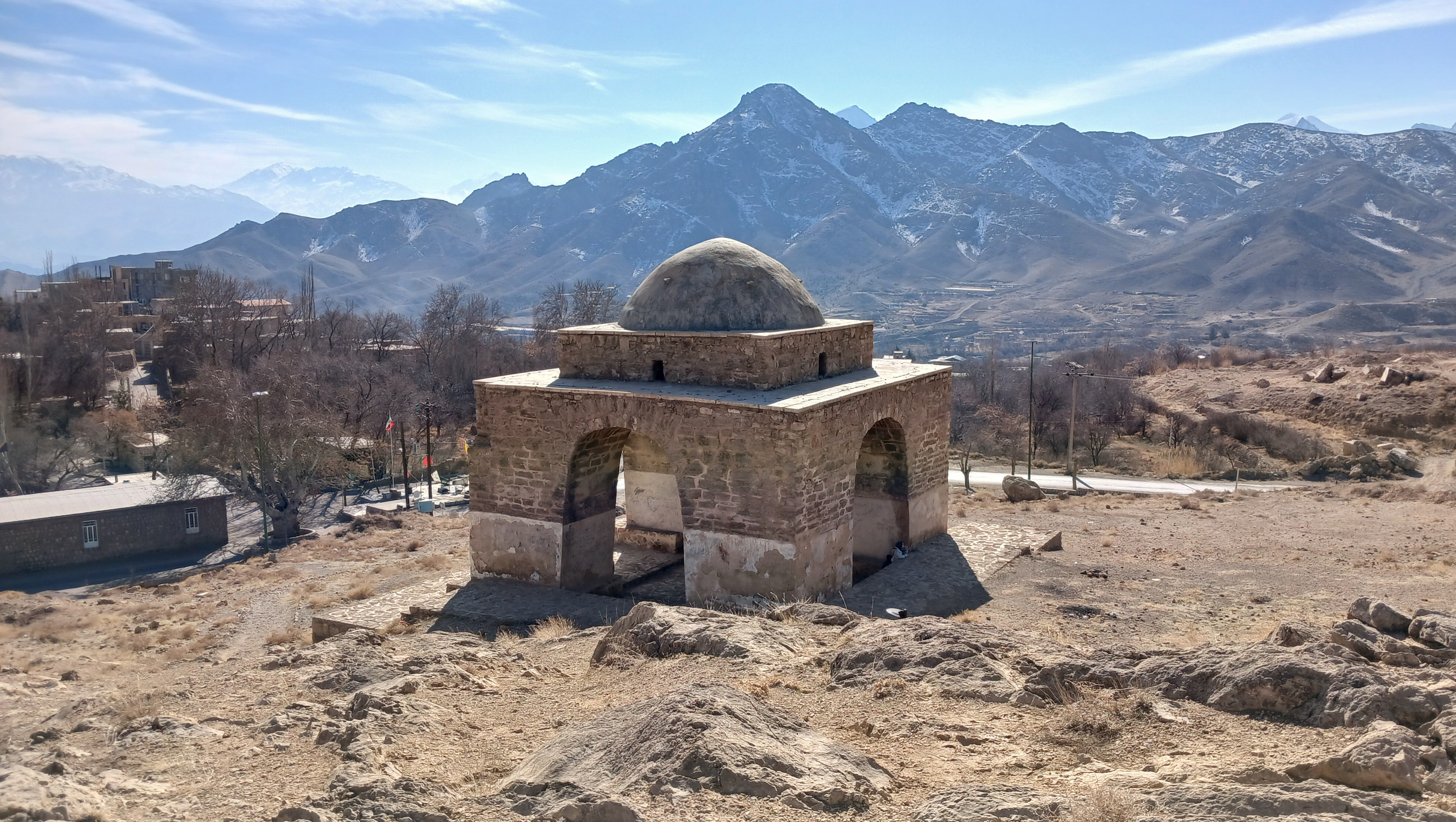
Chahartaq (architecture) of Neysar

== Notable residents ==
- Hassan Shariati Niyasar, Shia cleric and politician
