= Results of the 2006 Iranian Assembly of Experts election =

This article contains the results of the 2006 Iranian Assembly of Experts election.

== Single-seat constituencies ==
=== Ilam ===
Candidate	Votes	%
Rahim Mohammadi	151,747	55.39
Mojtaba Taheri	122,199	44.61
Total	273,946	100.00
Valid votes	273,946	88.29
Invalid/blank votes	36,340	11.71
Total votes	310,286	100.00
Registered voters/turnout		83
	Election nullified	
Source: Ministry of Interior

=== Bushehr ===
Candidate	Votes	%
Hashem Hosseini Bushehri	356,689	95.42
Hashem Niazi	17,104	4.58
Total	373,793	100.00
Valid votes	373,793	89.53
Invalid/blank votes	43,712	10.47
Total votes	417,505	100.00
Registered voters/turnout		72
Source: Ministry of Interior

=== Chaharmahal and Bakhtiari ===
Candidate	Votes	%
Alireza Eslamian	189,825	52.23
Mohammad-Reza Nasseri	173,614	47.77
Total	363,439	100.00
Valid votes	363,439	89.65
Invalid/blank votes	41,958	10.35
Total votes	405,397	100.00
Registered voters/turnout		69
Source: Ministry of Interior

=== South Khorasan ===
Candidate	Votes	%
Ebrahim Raisi	200,906	71.94
Mohammad-Ebrahim Rabbani	74,176	26.56
Ghorban-Ali Shahmiri	4,188	1.50
Total	279,270	100.00
Valid votes	279,270	95.37
Invalid/blank votes	13,557	4.63
Total votes	292,827	100.00
Registered voters/turnout		78
Source: Ministry of Interior

=== North Khorasan ===
Candidate	Votes	%
Habibollah Mehmannavaz	268,930	74.06
Saeid Rajaei-Arbabi	94,177	25.94
Total	363,107	100.00
Valid votes	363,107	91.19
Invalid/blank votes	35,077	8.81
Total votes	398,184	100.00
Registered voters/turnout		71
Source: Ministry of Interior

=== Kohgiluyeh and Boyer-Ahmad ===
Candidate	Votes	%
Karamatollah Malek-Hosseini	208,798	74.73
Ali Edalat	70,597	25.27
Total	279,395	100.00
Valid votes	279,395	86.97
Invalid/blank votes	41,852	13.03
Total votes	321,247	100.00
Registered voters/turnout		81
Source: Ministry of Interior

=== Yazd ===
Candidate	Votes	%
Abolghasem Wafi Yazdi	190,027	50.62
Jalil Sadr-Tabatabaei	185,372	49.38
Total	375,399	100.00
Valid votes	375,399	89.77
Invalid/blank votes	42,758	10.23
Total votes	418,157	100.00
Registered voters/turnout		68
Source: Ministry of Interior

=== Hormozgan ===
Candidate	Votes	%
Gholam-Ali Naeimabadi	274,896	50.05
Mahmoud Rajabi	145,762	26.54
Mohammad-Hassan Ahmadi Faqih	128,563	23.41
Total	549,221	100.00
Valid votes	549,221	92.25
Invalid/blank votes	46,149	7.75
Total votes	595,370	100.00
Registered voters/turnout		75
Source: Ministry of Interior

=== Qom ===
Candidate	Votes	%
Mohammad Momen	181,640	59.34
Mohammad Sajjadi Ata-Abadi	57,331	18.73
Mohammad-Sadegh Alamolhoda	39,511	12.91
Esmaeil Nouri	17,522	5.72
Mohsen Gharavian	10,087	3.30
Total	306,091	100.00
Valid votes	306,091	85.69
Invalid/blank votes	51,116	14.31
Total votes	357,207	100.00
Registered voters/turnout		58
Source: Ministry of Interior

=== Semnan ===
Candidate	Votes	%
Mohammad Shahcheraghi	165,485	61.23
Abdollah Ahmadi	104,780	38.77
Total	270,265	100.00
Valid votes	270,265	90.63
Invalid/blank votes	27,927	9.37
Total votes	298,192	100.00
Registered voters/turnout		75
Source: Ministry of Interior

=== Zanjan ===
Candidate	Votes	%
Mohammad Taghi Vaezi	380,308	89.04
Gholamreza Fayyazi	46,832	10.96
Total	427,140	100.00
Valid votes	427,140	91.15
Invalid/blank votes	41,495	8.85
Total votes	468,635	100.00
Registered voters/turnout		66
Source: Ministry of Interior
