= Kuh Dasht Rural District =

Rural district in Isfahan province, Iran

Kuh Dasht Rural District Persian: دهستان كوه دشت
- Rural District
- Location within Iran
- Coordinates: 34°09′N 51°04′E
- Country: Iran
- Province: Isfahan
- County: Kashan
- District: Neyasar
- Established: 1987
- Capital: Ormak

Population (2016)
  - Total: 3,555
- Time zone: UTC+3:30 (IRST)

Kuh Dasht Rural District (Persian: دهستان كوه دشت) is in Neyasar District of Kashan County, Isfahan province, Iran. Its capital is the village of Ormak.

== Demographics ==
=== Population ===
At the time of the 2006 National Census, the rural district's population was 2,174 in 850 households. There were 2,322 inhabitants in 979 households at the following census of 2011. The 2016 census measured the population of the rural district as 3,555 in 1,353 households. The most populous of its 10 villages was Kalleh, with 765 people.

=== Other villages in the rural district ===
- Aznaveh
- Borzabad
- Farahabad
- Qeh
- Rahaq
- Sar
- Vadeqan
- Van
