= Seyed Esmaeil Mousavi Zanjani =

Iranian Ayatollah (1928-2002)

Ayatollah Seyed Esmaeil Mousavi Zanjani
- سیداسماعیل موسوی زنجانی
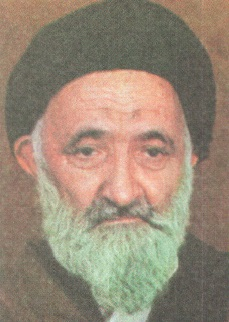

Personal life
- Born: 1928 Pari, Zanjan Province, Iran
- Died: 18 December 2002 (aged 73–74) Zanjan, Zanjan Province, Iran
- Resting place: Fatima Masumeh Shrine, Qom
- Education: Qom Hawza

Religious life
- Religion: Shia Islam
- Profession: Imam, politician

Senior posting
- Post: Member of Assembly of Experts, representing Zanjan Province
- Period in office: 1982–2002
- Predecessor: inaugural
- Successor: Mohammad Taghi Vaezi
- Previous post: Representative of the Supreme Leader in Zanjan Province and Imam Jumu'ah of Zanjan (1982–2002)
- Influenced by: Mir Asadollah Madani, Imam Khomeini, Seyyed Hossein Borujerdi, Mohaghegh Damad

Ayatollah Seyed Esmaeil Mousavi Zanjani (Persian: سیداسماعیل موسوی زنجانی, 1928 – 18 December 2002) was an Iranian Shiite cleric and politician. He was a member of the 1st, 2nd and 3rd Assembly of Experts from the Zanjan Province electorate. He was imam Jumu'ah for Zanjan and Representative of the Supreme Leader in Zanjan Province in the period after Iranian Revolution until his death.

== Influence ==
Zanjani was influenced by Mir Asadollah Madani, Imam Khomeini, Seyyed Hossein Borujerdi, and Mohaghegh Damad.

== See also ==
- List of members in the First Term of the Council of Experts
- List of members in the Second Term of the Council of Experts
- List of members in the Third Term of the Council of Experts

Political offices
Preceded by (Iran) Mohammad Ezodin Hosseini Zanjani	Imam Jumu'ah of Zanjan and Representative of the Supreme Leader; 1982- 2002	Succeeded by (Iran) Mohammad Taghi Vaezi
