= Mohammad Sadoughi =

Iranian Islamic cleric (1909–1982)

Mohammad Sadoughi محمد صدوقی
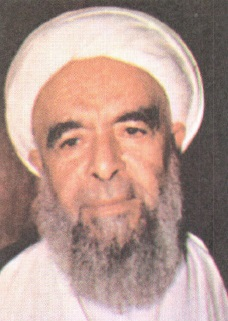
- Imam of Friday Prayer and representative of Yazd people in Assembly of experts
- Title: Ayatollah

Personal life
- Born: 1 March 1909 Yazd, Iran
- Died: 2 July 1982 (aged 73) Yazd
- Other name: Persian: محمد صدوقی

Religious life
- Religion: Shia Islam

Mohammad Sadoughi (Persian: محمد صدوقی; 1909–1982) known as "Sevomin-Shahide-Mehrab" (the 3rd martyr of Mihrab) was an Iranian Twelver Shia Ayatollah born in Yazd.

He served as a representative of the people of Yazd in the assembly of experts and was appointed Imam of Friday Prayer in Yazd in 1980 by decree of the former supreme leader of Iran, Seyyed Ruhollah Khomeini.

Sadoughi was born into a prominent religious family. His father, Ayatollah Mirza-Taleb, was a well-known cleric in Yazd and served as the imam of prayer at the Rozeye-Mohammadieh (Hazireh) Mosque. Sadoughi began his early religious education at the AbdolRahman-Khan school, later continuing his studies in Isfahan before returning to Yazd. He subsequently moved to Qom, where he pursued advanced religious studies in Hawzah. Sadoughi was assassinated on 2 July 1982 after leading the Friday Prayer.

== Teachers ==
- Abdul-Karim Haeri Yazdi
- Sadr al-Din al-Sadr
- Shahab ud-Din Mar'ashi Najafi
- Seyyed Mohammad-Taqi Khansari
- Seyyed Mohammad-Hojjat Kouhkamari

== Students ==
- Mohammad-Taqi Ja'fari
- Morteza Motahhari
- Ahmad Jannati
- Mohammad Fazel Lankarani
- Yousef Saanei
- Seyyed Hashem Rasouli Mahallati
- Majid Jaefari Tabar
- Hassan Shariati Niyasar
- Ali Qoddousi
