= Mohammad Taghi Vaezi =

Iranian Ayatollah

- محمد تقی واعظی
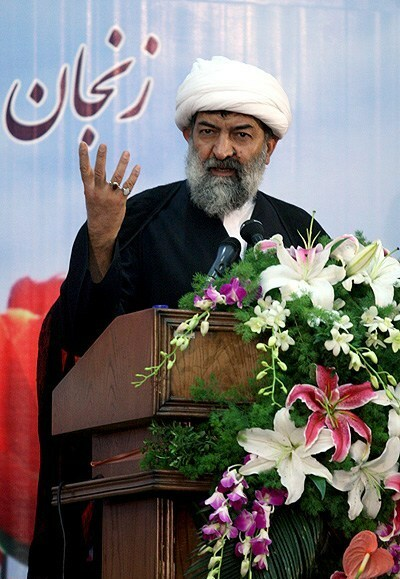
- Ayatollah Mohammad Taghi Vaezi giving a speech in 2011, Zanjan Province

Representative of the Supreme Leader in Zanjan Province and Imam Jumu'ah of Zanjan
- In office 2003–2011
- Preceded by: Esmaeil Mousavi
- Succeeded by: Ali Khatami

member of Assembly of Experts
- In office December 15, 2006 – 2016
- Constituency: Zanjan Province

Personal details
- Born: 1951 (age 74–75) Tehran, Iran
- Education: Qom Hawza

Ayatollah Mohammad Taghi Vaezi (Persian: محمد تقی واعظی, born 1951 in Tehran) is an Iranian Shia cleric, author and politician. He is a member of the 4th Assembly of Experts from the Zanjan Province electorate. Vaezi won membership with 380,308 votes. He has been imam Jumu'ah for Zanjan in northwest of Iran since 2003. to 2011.

== See also ==
- List of members in the Fourth Term of the Council of Experts
- List of ayatollahs

Political offices
Preceded by (Iran) Esmaeil Mousavi	Imam Jumu'ah of Zanjan and Representative of the Supreme Leader; 2003- 2011	Succeeded by (Iran) Ali Khatami
