= Ghiasabad, Kermanshah =

Ghiasabad غياث‌آباد
- Village
- Location within Iran
- Coordinates: 34°45′57″N 47°33′42″E
- Country: Iran
- Province: Kermanshah
- County: Sonqor
- Bakhsh: Central
- Rural District: Sarab

Population (2006)
  - Total: 150
- Time zone: UTC+3:30 (IRST)
  - Summer (DST): UTC+4:30 (IRDT)

Ghiasabad (Persian: غياث‌آباد, also Romanized as Ghīās̄ābād) is a village in Sarab Rural District, in the Central District of Sonqor County, Kermanshah Province, Iran. At the 2006 census, its population was 150, in 39 families.
