= Ghiasabad, Kharameh =

Ghiasabad غياث‌آباد
- Village
- Location within Iran
- Coordinates: 29°32′57″N 53°21′44″E
- Country: Iran
- Province: Fars
- County: Kharameh
- Bakhsh: Central
- Rural District: Sofla

Population (2006)
  - Total: 104
- Time zone: UTC+3:30 (IRST)
  - Summer (DST): UTC+4:30 (IRDT)

Ghiasabad (Persian: غياث‌آباد, also Romanized as Ghīās̄ābād and Gheyās̄ābād) is a village in Sofla Rural District, in the Central District of Kharameh County, Fars province, Iran. At the 2006 census, its population was 104, in 24 families.
