= Neyasar Rural District =

Rural district in Isfahan province, Iran

Neyasar Rural District Persian: دهستان نياسر
- Rural District
- Location within Iran
- Coordinates: 34°00′N 51°07′E
- Country: Iran
- Province: Isfahan
- County: Kashan
- District: Neyasar
- Established: 1987
- Capital: Neyasar

Population (2016)
  - Total: 5,947
- Time zone: UTC+3:30 (IRST)

Neyasar Rural District (Persian: دهستان نياسر) is in Neyasar District of Kashan County, Isfahan province, Iran. It is administered from the city of Neyasar.

== Demographics ==
=== Population ===
At the time of the 2006 National Census, the rural district's population was 4,823 in 1,437 households. There were 4,442 inhabitants in 1,452 households at the following census of 2011. The 2016 census measured the population of the rural district as 5,947 in 1,965 households. The most populous of its 26 villages was Neshlaj, with 3,024 people.

=== Other villages in the rural district ===
- Alavi
- Bari Karsaf
- Chenar
- Eshaqabad
- Ghaiasbad
- Hasnarud
