= Banadkuk Rural District =

Rural district in Yazd province, Iran

Banadkuk Rural District Persian: دهستان بنادكوك
- Rural District
- Location within Iran
- Coordinates: 31°30′14″N 53°57′42″E
- Country: Iran
- Province: Yazd
- County: Taft
- District: Nir
- Capital: Banadkuk-e Dizeh

Population (2016)
  - Total: 1,500
- Time zone: UTC+3:30 (IRST)

Banadkuk Rural District (Persian: دهستان بنادكوك) is in Nir District of Taft County, Yazd province, Iran. Its capital is the village of Banadkuk-e Dizeh.

== Demographics ==
=== Population ===
At the time of the 2006 National Census, the rural district's population was 2,010 in 674 households. There were 1,881 inhabitants in 658 households at the following census of 2011. The 2016 census measured the population of the rural district as 1,500 in 573 households. The most populous of its 263 villages was Banadkuk-e Dizeh, with 1,227 people.
