= Ghiasabad, Kurdistan =

Ghiasabad غياث‌آباد
- Village
- Location within Iran
- Coordinates: 35°53′49″N 47°16′45″E
- Country: Iran
- Province: Kurdistan
- County: Divandarreh
- Bakhsh: Central
- Rural District: Howmeh

Population (2006)
  - Total: 269
- Time zone: UTC+3:30 (IRST)
  - Summer (DST): UTC+4:30 (IRDT)

Ghiasabad (Persian: غياث‌آباد, also Romanized as Ghīās̄ābād) is a village in Howmeh Rural District, in the Central District of Divandarreh County, Kurdistan Province, Iran. At the 2006 census, its population was 269, in 53 families. The village is populated by Kurds.
