= Ghiasabad, Kashan =

Village in Isfahan province, Iran

Ghiasabad Persian: غياث آباد
- Village
- Location within Iran
- Coordinates: 34°02′39″N 51°02′04″E
- Country: Iran
- Province: Isfahan
- County: Kashan
- District: Neyasar
- Rural District: Neyasar

Population (2016)
  - Total: 365
- Time zone: UTC+3:30 (IRST)

Ghiasabad (Persian: غياث‌آباد) (Note: Also romanized as Ghīās̄ābād; also known as Ghīās̄ābād-e Bālā) is a village in Neyasar Rural District of Neyasar District in Kashan County, Isfahan province, Iran.

== Demographics ==
=== Population ===
At the time of the 2006 National Census, the village's population was 224 in 71 households. The following census in 2011 counted 208 people in 72 households. The 2016 census measured the population of the village as 365 people in 129 households.
