= Sultan Ali =

Son of Muhammad al-Baqir

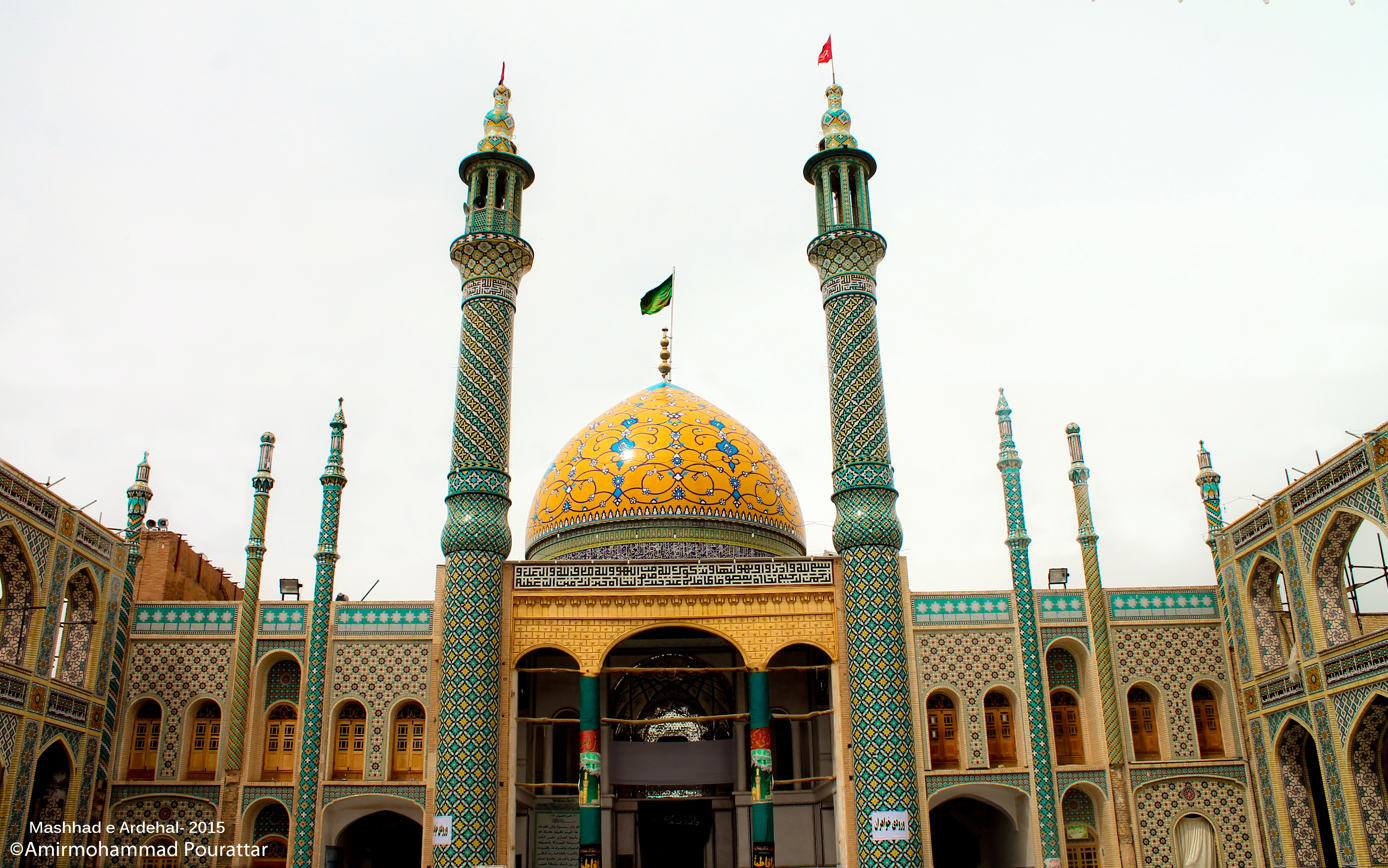
Mashhad e Ardahal

Sulṭān ʿAlī ibn Muḥammad al-Bāqir ibn ʿAlī Zayn al-ʿĀbidīn ibn Al-Ḥusayn (Arabic: سلطان علي بن محمد الباقر بن علي زين العابدين بن الحسين) was the son of the fifth imam of Twelver Shi'i Muslims and fourth imam of Isma'ili Shi'i Muslims, Muhammad al-Baqir. Born in Medina, Ali, known in Iran as "Sultan Ali," was dispatched by his father to the areas of Kashan and Qom, where he served as a Friday prayer leader and teacher; his popularity and his preaching of Shi'i Islam proved threatening to the local representative of the Umayyad dynasty. The Umayyad representative's forces cornered and killed Sultan Ali and a band of his supporters, after a prolonged battle, and before a larger group of supporters could arrive, in Ardihal, a village roughly 45 kilometers east of Kashan on August 7, 734 CE (27 Jamadi II, 116 AH). He is still revered by Shi'i Muslims, especially in Iran, where his burial place—which has undergone repeated renovations but dates, in part, to the Saljuq period—has become a site of visitation. The shrine is known for a distinctive annual carpet-washing ritual (qālī-shūyān) that occurs on the seventeenth day of autumn to commemorate the day of Sultan Ali's martyrdom, a ritual that might have its origins in Sultan Ali's body having been wrapped in a carpet and brought to the site of his burial after his murder.

According to genealogical reports, Sultan Ali was the son of the fifth Shi'i imam, the brother to the sixth Shi'i imam, as well as possibly father-in-law to the seventh Shi'i imam, by way of his daughter Fāṭima.

== See also ==
- Imamzadeh Ali ibn Jafar
