= Ghiasabad, Marvdasht =

Ghiasabad غياث‌آباد
- Village
- Location within Iran
- Coordinates: 29°55′52″N 53°01′59″E
- Country: Iran
- Province: Fars
- County: Marvdasht
- Bakhsh: Seyyedan
- Rural District: Rahmat

Population (2006)
  - Total: 90
- Time zone: UTC+3:30 (IRST)
  - Summer (DST): UTC+4:30 (IRDT)

Ghiasabad (Persian: غياث‌آباد; Romanized as Ghīās̄ābād and Ghīyāsābād; also known as Qīāsābād and Qīyās̄ābād) is a village in Rahmat Rural District, Seyyedan District, Marvdasht County, Fars province, Iran. At the 2006 census, its population was 90, in 22 families.
