= Garizat District =

District in Yazd province, Iran

Garizat District Persian: بخش گاریزات
- District
- Location within Iran
- Coordinates: 31°12′19″N 53°57′47″E
- Country: Iran
- Province: Yazd
- County: Taft
- Capital: Bakh

Population (2016)
  - Total: 4,814
- Time zone: UTC+3:30 (IRST)

Garizat District (Persian: بخش گاریزات) is in Taft County, Yazd province, Iran. Its capital is the city of Bakh.

== History ==
After the 2006 National Census, Garizat (Note: Formerly Ernan Rural District) and Kahduiyeh Rural Districts were separated from Nir District in the formation of Garizat District. After the 2016 census, the village of Bakh was elevated to the status of a city.

== Demographics ==
=== Population ===
At the time of the 2011 census, the district's population was 6,599 people in 2,027 households. The 2016 census measured the population of the district as 4,814 inhabitants in 1,675 households.

=== Administrative divisions ===
Garizat District Population
Administrative Divisions	2011	2016
Garizat RD	5,550	3,933
Kahduiyeh RD	1,049	881
Bakh (city) (Note: Became a city after the 2016 census)		
Total	6,599	4,814
RD = Rural District
