= Qiasabad-e Olya =

Qiasabad-e Olya قياس‌آباد عليا
- Village
- Location within Iran
- Coordinates: 36°17′05″N 59°47′32″E
- Country: Iran
- Province: Razavi Khorasan
- County: Mashhad
- Bakhsh: Central
- Rural District: Kenevist

Population (2006)
  - Total: 155
- Time zone: UTC+3:30 (IRST)
  - Summer (DST): UTC+4:30 (IRDT)

Qiasabad-e Olya (Persian: قياس‌آباد عليا, also Romanized as Qīāsābād-e ‘Olyā; also known as Qīāsābād-e Bālā and Ghīās̄ābād-e Bālā) is a village in Kenevist Rural District, in the Central District of Mashhad County, Razavi Khorasan Province, Iran. At the 2006 census, its population was 155, in 47 families.
