= Sakhvid Rural District =

Rural district in Yazd province, Iran

Sakhvid Rural District Persian: دهستان سخويد
- Rural District
- Location within Iran
- Coordinates: 31°26′52″N 54°04′00″E
- Country: Iran
- Province: Yazd
- County: Taft
- District: Nir
- Capital: Tudeh

Population (2016)
  - Total: 1,420
- Time zone: UTC+3:30 (IRST)

Sakhvid Rural District (Persian: دهستان سخويد) is in Nir District of Taft County, Yazd province, Iran. Its capital is the village of Tudeh.

== Demographics ==
=== Population ===
At the time of the 2006 National Census, the rural district's population was 1,747 in 565 households. There were 1,766 inhabitants in 606 households at the following census of 2011. The 2016 census measured the population of the rural district as 1,420 in 550 households. The most populous of its 145 villages was Tudeh, with 217 people.
