= Kahduiyeh Rural District =

Rural district in Yazd province, Iran

Kahduiyeh Rural District Persian: دهستان كهدوئيه
- Rural District
- Location within Iran
- Coordinates: 31°22′14″N 53°54′20″E
- Country: Iran
- Province: Yazd
- County: Taft
- District: Garizat
- Capital: Kahduiyeh

Population (2016)
  - Total: 881
- Time zone: UTC+3:30 (IRST)

Kahduiyeh Rural District (Persian: دهستان كهدوئيه) is in Garizat District of Taft County, Yazd province, Iran. Its capital is the village of Kahduiyeh.

== Demographics ==
=== Population ===
At the time of the 2006 National Census, the rural district's population (as a part of Nir District) was 1,133 in 332 households. There were 1,049 inhabitants in 330 households at the following census of 2011, by which time the rural district had been separated from the district in the establishment of Garizat District. The 2016 census measured the population of the rural district as 881 in 298 households. The most populous of its 18 villages was Kahduiyeh, with 589 people.
