= Garizat Rural District =

Rural district in Yazd province, Iran

Garizat Rural District Persian: دهستان گاريزات
- Rural District
- Location within Iran
- Coordinates: 31°11′57″N 53°57′47″E
- Country: Iran
- Province: Yazd
- County: Taft
- District: Garizat
- Capital: Bakh

Population (2016)
  - Total: 3,933
- Time zone: UTC+3:30 (IRST)

Garizat Rural District (Persian: دهستان گاريزات), (Note: Formerly Ernan Rural District (دهستان ارنان)) is in Garizat District of Taft County, Yazd province, Iran. It is administered from the city of Bakh.

== Demographics ==
=== Population ===
At the time of the 2006 National Census, the rural district's population (as a part of Nir District) was 5,558 in 1,538 households. There were 5,550 inhabitants in 1,697 households at the following census of 2011, by which time the rural district had been separated from the district in the formation of Garizat District. The 2016 census measured the population of the rural district as 3,933 in 1,377 households. The most populous of its 84 villages was Bakh (now a city), with 718 people.
