= Nir District =

District in Yazd province, Iran

Nir District Persian: بخش نیر
- District
- Location within Iran
- Coordinates: 31°28′37″N 54°04′39″E
- Country: Iran
- Province: Yazd
- County: Taft
- Capital: Nir

Population (2016)
  - Total: 6,625
- Time zone: UTC+3:30 (IRST)

Nir District (Persian: بخش نیر) is in Taft County, Yazd province, Iran. Its capital is the city of Nir.

== History ==
After the 2006 National Census, Garizat (Note: Formerly Ernan Rural District) and Kahduiyeh Rural Districts were separated from the district in the formation of Garizat District.

== Demographics ==
=== Population ===
At the time of the 2006 census, the district's population was 14,531 in 4,417 households. The following census in 2011 counted 7,178 people in 2,470 households. The 2016 census measured the population of the rural district as 6,625 inhabitants in 2,517 households.

=== Administrative divisions ===
Nir District Population
Administrative Divisions	2006	2011	2016
Banadkuk RD	2,010	1,881	1,500
Garizat RD (Note: Transferred to Garizat District)	5,558		
Kahduiyeh RD	1,133		
Sakhvid RD	1,747	1,766	1,420
Zardeyn RD (Note: Formerly Poshtkuh Rural District)	2,516	1,911	1,965
Nir (city)	1,567	1,620	1,740
Total	14,531	7,178	6,625
RD = Rural District
