= Taft County =

County in Yazd province, Iran

Taft County Persian: شهرستان تفت
- County
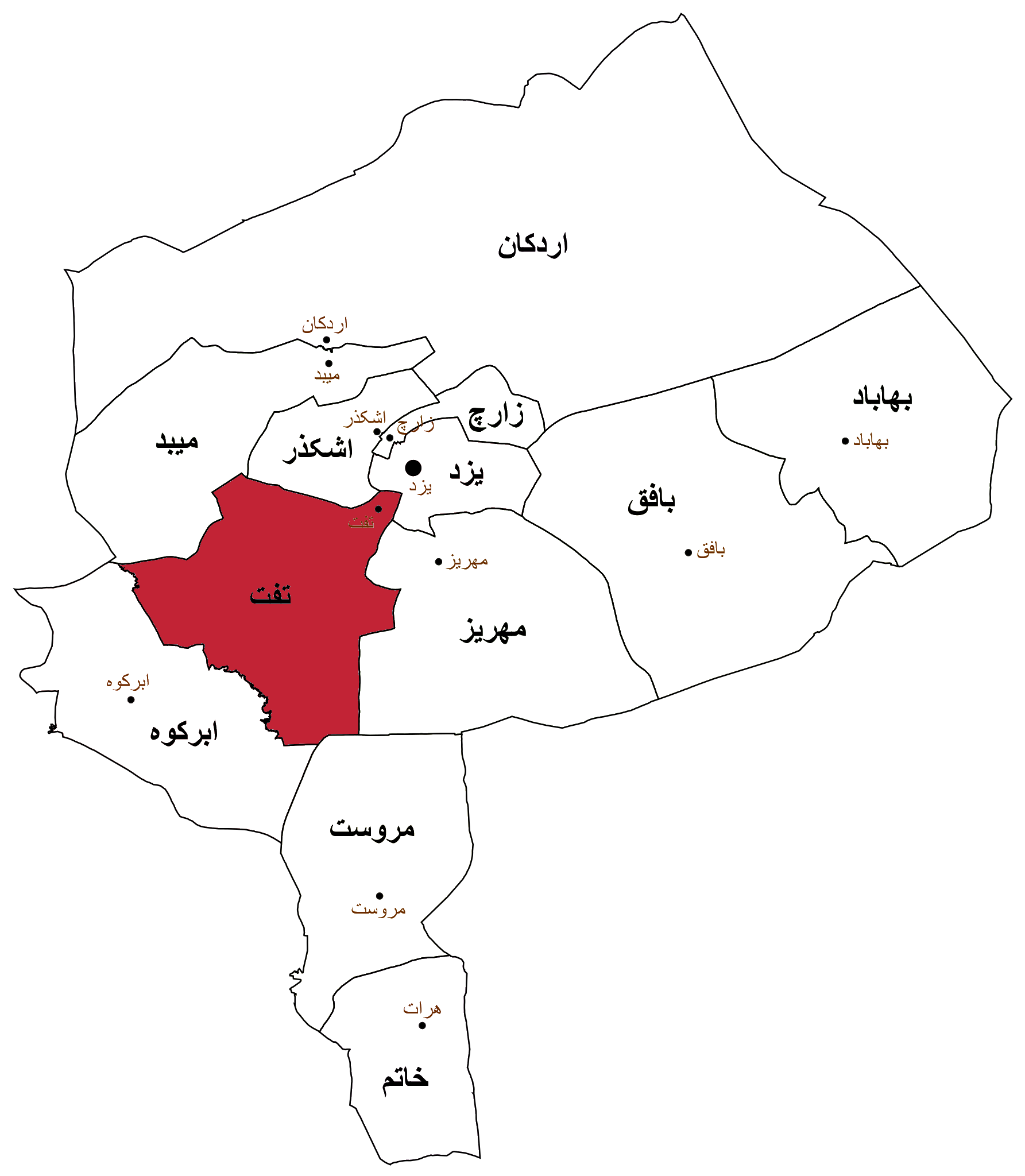
- Location of Taft County in Yazd province

- Location of Yazd province in Iran
- Coordinates: 31°25′N 53°45′E
- Country: Iran
- Province: Yazd
- Capital: Taft
- Districts: Central, Garizat, Nir

Population (2016)
  - Total: 43,893
- Time zone: UTC+3:30 (IRST)

Taft County (Persian: شهرستان تفت) is in Yazd province, Iran. Its capital is the city of Taft.

== History ==
After the 2006 National Census, Garizat (Note: Formerly Ernan Rural District) and Kahduiyeh Rural Districts were separated from Nir District in the formation of Garizat District. After the 2016 census, the village of Bakh was elevated to the status of a city.

== Demographics ==
=== Population ===
At the time of the 2006 census, the county's population was 45,357 in 13,747 households. The following census in 2011 counted 45,145 people in 14,325 households. The 2016 census measured the population of the county as 43,893 in 14,659 households.

=== Administrative divisions ===
Taft County's population history and administrative structure over three consecutive censuses are shown in the following table.

Taft County Population
Administrative Divisions	2006	2011	2016
Central District	30,826	31,368	32,454
Aliabad RD	2,473	2,349	1,970
Dehshir RD	3,173	2,567	2,855
Nasrabad RD	3,821	5,142	3,628
Pishkuh RD	4,310	4,284	4,492
Shirkuh RD	1,720	1,309	1,045
Taft (city)	15,329	15,717	18,464
Garizat District		6,599	4,814
Garizat RD		5,550	3,933
Kahduiyeh RD		1,049	881
Bakh (city) (Note: Became a city after the 2016 census)			
Nir District	14,531	7,178	6,625
Banadkuk RD	2,010	1,881	1,500
Garizat RD	5,558		
Kahduiyeh RD	1,133		
Sakhvid RD	1,747	1,766	1,420
Zardeyn RD (Note: Formerly Poshtkuh Rural District)	2,516	1,911	1,965
Nir (city)	1,567	1,620	1,740
Total	45,357	45,145	43,893
RD = Rural District

== See also ==
Media related to Taft County at Wikimedia Commons
