= Neyasar District =

District in Isfahan province, Iran

Neyasar District Persian: بخش نیاسر
- District
- Location within Iran
- Coordinates: 34°05′N 51°04′E
- Country: Iran
- Province: Isfahan
- County: Kashan
- Capital: Neyasar

Population (2016)
  - Total: 11,821
- Time zone: UTC+3:30 (IRST)

Neyasar District (Persian: بخش نیاسر) is in Kashan County, Isfahan province, Iran. Its capital is the city of Neyasar.

== Demographics ==
=== Population ===
At the time of the 2006 National Census, the district's population was 9,000 in 2,873 households. The following census in 2011 counted 8,935 people in 3,078 households. The 2016 census measured the population of the district as 11,821 inhabitants in 4,098 households.

=== Administrative divisions ===
Neyasar District Population
Administrative Divisions	2006	2011	2016
Kuh Dasht RD	2,174	2,322	3,555
Neyasar RD	4,823	4,442	5,947
Neyasar (city)	2,003	2,171	2,319
Total	9,000	8,935	11,821
RD = Rural District
