= Akbar Abdi =

Iranian actor and comedian (1960–2026)

- اکبر عبدی
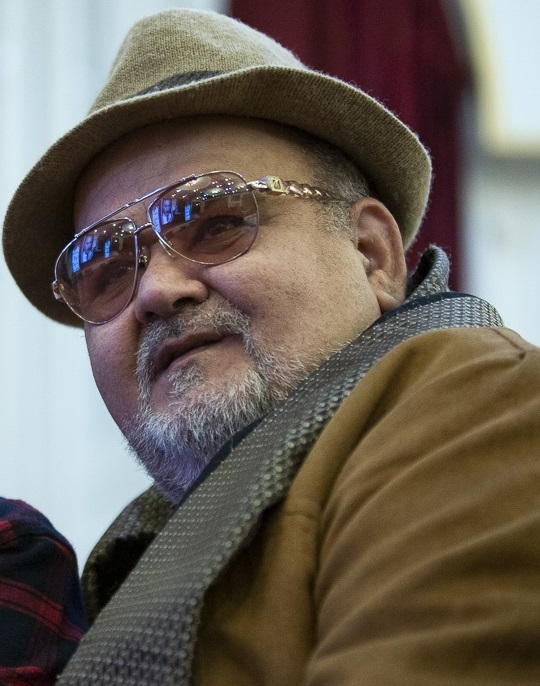
- Abdi in 2020
- Born: 26 August 1960; Tehran, Iran
- Died: 24 July 2026 (aged 65); Tehran, Iran
- Occupation: Actor
- Years active: 1981–2026
- Spouse: Masoumeh Ghasemi (m. 1986)
- Children: 1
- Awards: Order of Culture and Art (1st Class)

Akbar Abdi (Persian: اکبر عبدی, 26 August 1960 – 24 July 2026) was an Iranian actor. He received various accolades, including two Crystal Simorghs, a Hafez Award and an Iran's Film Critics and Writers Association Award.

== Life and career ==
Abdi began his career in 1981 with the children's television series The Traffic Neighborhood, directed by Dariush Moadebian. His main credits include The Actor, Delshodegan, and The Snowman. He also acted in the film Ejareh-Nesheenha (The Tenants).

He underwent a kidney transplant in June 2016. Abdi died from a heart attack on 24 July 2026, at the age of 65.

== Filmography ==
=== Film ===
Year	Title	Role	Director	Notes	Ref(s)
1984	The Great Controversy		Siavash Shakeri		
1985	The Man Who Became a Mouse		Ahmad Bakhshi		
1986	The Mission		Hossein Zandbaf		
1987	The Stranger	Parviz	Rahman Rezaee		
1987	The Tenants	Mr. Ghandi	Dariush Mehrjui		
1989	Grand Cinema		Hossein Hedayat		
1990	Mother	Gholam Reza	Ali Hatami		
1991	The Old Men's School		Ali Sajadi Hosseini		
1992	Love-stricken	Faraj Boulsik	Ali Hatami		
1992	Once Upon a Time, Cinema		Mohsen Makhmalbaf		
1993	Actor	Akbar Abdi	Mohsen Makhmalbaf		
1996	Mr. Sunshine		Homayoun As'adian		
1999	All		Fereydoun Hassanpour		
2000	Once Upon a Time		Iraj Tahmasb		
2007	The Outcast	Bayram Loder	Masoud Dehnamaki		
2008	Lover		Godratollah Solh Mirzaee		
2009	The Outcast 2	Bayram Loder	Masoud Dehnamaki		
2009	Heartbroken		Ali Rouintan		
2009	Checkmate		Jamshid Heidari		
2010	Pay Back		Tahmineh Milani		
2011	The Outcast 3	Bayram Loder	Masoud Dehnamaki		
2011	The President's Cell Phone	Ghorban Ali's brother-in-law	Ali Atshani		
2012	Displace	Ali	Ali Tavakolnia		
2012	I Feel Sleepy	Reza's Mother	Reza Attaran		
2013	Notoriety	Yousef	Masoud Dehnamaki		
2014	The Sleepy Ones	Mother	Fereydoun Jeyrani		
2014	Miʿrajis	Akbar	Masoud Dehnamaki		
2015	In Due Course		Vahid Amirkhani		
2016	Notoriety 2	Yousef	Masoud Dehnamaki		
2016	Four Isfahanians in Baghdad		Mohammad Reza Momtaz		
2018	Loveulance	Keramat	Mohsen Mahini		
2018	Misunderstanding		Ahmad Reza Motamedi		
2018	Bitter Smile		Mohammad Reza Motamedi		
2019	Happy Birthday		Somayyeh Zareinezhad		
2019	X-Large		Mohsen Tavakoli		
2019	Tornado 2	Professor Andish	Javad Hashemi		
2021	Automobile		Ali Miri Ramesheh		
2022	Hot Silver		Mohsen Aghakhan		

=== Web ===
Year	Title	Role	Director	Platform	Ref(s)
2013–2014	King of Ear	Rahman Shoja'at	Davood Mirbagheri	Video CD	

== Awards and nominations ==
- Received the Crystal Simorgh for the second role of a man from the 8th Fajr Film Festival for his role in Ali Hatami's film Mother (1989)
- Received Crystal Simorgh for Best Supporting Actor from the 30th Fajr International Film Festival for his role in the film I Dream I Made by Reza Attaran
- Nominated for the 20th Fajr Film Festival Award for the film Bread, Love and Motor 1000
