= Dara o Nadar =

- Directed by: Fereidoun Hassanpour
- Written by: Fereidoun Hassanpour
- Produced by: Taghi Aligholizadeh
- Starring: Akbar Abdi; Ahmad Aghalu; Mahmoud Basiri; Soroosh Khalili; Fateme Sadeghi
- Cinematography: Ebrahim Ghafouri
- Edited by: Saeid Shahsavari
- Music by: Mohammad Reza Aligholi
- Release date: 1999
- Running time: 85 min
- Country: Iran
- Language: Persian

Dara o Nadar (Persian: دارا و ندار) is a 1999 Iranian film, written and directed by Fereidoun Hassanpour and produced by Taghi Aligholizadeh.

== Plot ==
Saeed is a teenage boy who urgently needs surgery due to heart disease on the advice of his doctor. Saeed's school friends, who are aware of his inability to pay for surgery, form a group called Sohrab. With the help of Khosrow (Akbar Abdi), the school caretaker, who is Sohrab's uncle, Saeed's friend, they decide to pay for Saeed's surgery by forming an orchestra to participate in the festivities, when suddenly all the money is stolen by someone. But with the help of the plan of one of the members of the group named Hamid, the children regained the money and Saeed's surgery was performed successfully.

== Cast ==
=== Main cast ===
- Akbar Abdi - as Khosro
- Ahmad Aghalu - as Nazem
- Mahmoud Basiri - as Aref
- Soroosh Khalili - as Tala Foroosh
- Fatemeh Sadeghi - as Marjan
- Soheil Peyghambari - as Soheil
- Afshin Sangchap
- Mehrdad Nozari
- Akbar Dudkar
- Sima Khezrabadi
