= Notoriety (2013 film) =

- Directed by: Masoud Dehnamaki
- Written by: Masoud Dehnamaki
- Produced by: Masoud Dehnamaki
- Starring: Akbar Abdi; Mohammad-Reza Sharifinia; Elnaz Shakerdoust; Maryam Kavyani; Ramana Sayahi
- Release date: 13 March 2013 (Iran)
- Country: Iran
- Language: Persian
- Box office: $4 million

Notoriety is a 2013 Iranian movie directed by Masoud Dehnamaki.

== Subject ==
This movie is about theological issues especially enjoining good and forbidding wrong.

== Summary ==
A beautiful girl named Afsaneh who is living in Downtown has economic problems, and her family offers her to marry to their landlord whose wife had died. One night, she went to see a clergyman (Akbar Abdi). She was tired, and the clergyman let her sleep there for a night. Next morning, clergyman's students see the girl's shoes and think that they have slept together. Gossips spread through the city and the man is forced to leave town.

At the end people find out the true story and ask the man to come back.
