= Islamic fundamentalism in Iran =

Traditionally, the thought and practice of Islamic fundamentalism and Islamism in the nation of Iran has referred to various forms of Shi'i Islamic religious revivalism (Note: Among Iran's minority Sunni Muslim population, "Salafist ideas", i.e. conservative revivalist Sunni ideas, have "gained a foothold", according to Peyman Asadzade of Manara magazine. There have also been Sunni Islamist/fundamentalist activity in the form of attacks by extremist groups such as ISIS, who the Islamic Republic regime suspects of having connections among Iran's Sunni minority.) that seek a return to the original texts and the inspiration of the original believers of Islam. Issues of importance to the movement include the elimination of foreign, non-Islamic ideas and practices from Iran's society, economy and political system. It is often contrasted with other strains of Islamic thought, such as traditionalism, quietism and modernism. In Iran, Islamic fundamentalism and Islamism is primarily associated with the thought and practice of the leader of the Islamic Revolution and founder of the Islamic Republic of Iran, Ayatollah Ruhollah Khomeini ("Khomeinism"), but may also involve figures such as Fazlullah Nouri, Navvab Safavi, and successors of Khomeini.

In the 21st century, "fundamentalist" in the Islamic Republic of Iran generally refers to the political faction known as the "Principlists", (also spelled principlist) or Osoulgarayan—as in acting politically based on principles of the Islamic Revolution—which is an umbrella term for a variety of conservative circles and parties that (as of 2023) dominates politics in the country. (The Supreme Leader and the president are principlists, and principlists have control of the Assembly of Experts, the Guardian Council, the Expediency Discernment Council, and the Judiciary.) The term contrasts with "reformist" or Eslaah-Talabaan, who seek religious and constitutional reforms.

== Definitions and terminology ==
Some of the beliefs attributed to Islamic fundamentalists are that the primary sources of Islam (the Quran, Hadith, and Sunnah), should be interpreted in a literal and originalist way; that corrupting non-Islamic influences should be eliminated from every part of a Muslims' life; and that the societies, economies, and governance of Muslim-majority countries should return to the fundamentals of Islam, which make up a complete system including the Islamic state. (The term fundamentalism has also been criticized as coming from Christianity and not truly appropriate for Islam.) (Note: According to Bernard Lewis): "In western usage, these words [Revivalism and Fundamentalism] have a rather specific connotation; they suggest a certain type of religiosity- emotional indeed sentimental; not intellectual, perhaps even anti-intellectual; and in general apolitical and even anti-political. Fundamentalists are against liberal theology and biblical criticism and in favor of a return to fundamentals-i.e. to the divine inerrant text of the scriptures. For the so call fundamentalists of Islam these are not and never have been the issues. Liberal theology have not hitherto made much headway in Islam, and the divinity and inerrancy of the Quran are still central dogmas of the faith ... Unlike their Christian namesakes, the Islamic fundamentalists do not set aside but on the contrary embrace much of the post-scriptural scholastic tradition of their faith, in both its theological and its legal aspects.")

Academics have made a variety of distinctions between Fundamentalism, Islamism (political Islam) and other terms in Iran and other Islamic societies.

- Yahya Sadowski, distinguishes Islamic fundamentalism from Islamism, calling Islamism "neo-fundamentalism".
- A 2005 program on BBC Persian Service put Islamic movements among Iranians into three different categories:
  - "traditionalists" (represented by Hossein Nasr, Yousef Sanei),
  - "modernists" (represented by Abdolkarim Soroush), and
  - "fundamentalists" (represented by Ali Khamenei, Mohammad Taghi Mesbah-Yazdi, and several Grand Ayatollahs including Mahdi Hadavi).
- Javad Tabatabaei, Ronald Dworkin and a few other philosophers of law and politics have criticized the terminology of "conservatism", "fundamentalism" and "neo-fundamentalism" in the context of Iranian political philosophy, suggesting other classifications.
- According to Bernard Lewis, when it comes to Political Islam:

Even an appropriate vocabulary seemed to be lacking in western languages and writers on the subjects had recourse to such words as "revivalism", "fundamentalism" and "integrism." But most of these words have specifically Christian connotations, and their use to denote Islamic religious phenomena depends at best on a very loose analogy.

- A 2007 post from Radiozamaneh offered five categories for Iranian thinkers:
  - Anti-religious intellectuals
  - Religious intellectuals
  - Traditionists—who avoid modernity, neither accepting nor criticizing it. This group makes up the majority of clerics,
  - Traditionalists—who criticize modernity and humanism, believing in eternal traditional wisdom. However, unlike Fundamentalists, Traditionalists believe in religious pluralism.
  - Fundamentalists—who openly criticize modernity like Traditionalists and unlike Traditionists, but unlike them seek to take social and political power to put a stop to modernity and revive the religion.

== History ==
=== Emergence ===
Fundamentalism in Iran as a reaction to Western technology, colonialism, and exploitation arose in the early 20th century, and Sheikh Fazlollah Nouri and Navvab Safavi were among its pioneers figures.

Iran was the first country in the post-World War II era in which political Islam became the rallying cry for a revolution, which was followed by formally adopting political Islam as its ruling ideology. The grand alliance assembled by Ruhollah Khomeini that led to the 1979 revolution abandoned traditional clerical quietism, adopting diverse ideological interpretations of Islam. The first three Islamic discourses were Khomeinism, Ali Shariati's Islamic-left ideology, and Mehdi Bazargan's liberal-democratic Islam. The fourth discourse came from the socialist guerrilla groups of Islamic and secular variants, and the fifth was secular constitutionalism in socialist and nationalist forms. By a few years after the triumph of the revolution, the only discourse left was Khomeinism.

Khomeini has been called a populist, fundamentalist, Islamist, and a reformer (Note: In July 2007 Iranian reformist president Mohammad Khatami said that Ruhollah Khomeini was the leading "reformist" of our time.) by various observers.

=== Pre-modern background ===
There are different theories as to when the ruling concept of the Ayatollah Khomeini and Islamic Republic of Iran—that Islamic jurists ought to govern until the return of the Imam Mahdi—first appeared. Mohammad-Taqi Mesbah-Yazdi (and Ervand Abrahamian), insists it was a revolutionary advance developed by Imam Khomeini. Other theories are that the idea is not at all new, but has been accepted by knowledgeable Shia faqih since medieval times, but kept from the general public by taqiya (precautionary dissimulation) (Ahmed Vaezi); that it was "occasionally" interpreted during the reign of the Safavid dynasty (1501–1702 C.E.) (Hamid Algar), argued by scholar Molla Ahmad Naraqi (1771–1829 C.E.) (Yasuyuki Matsunaga), or by Morteza Ansari (~1781–1864 C.E.) (according to John Esposito).

Developments that might be called steps easing the path to theocratic rule were the 16th century rise of the Safavid dynasty over modern day Iran which made Twelver Shi'ism the state religion and belief compulsory; and in the late 18th century the triumph of the Usuli school of doctrine over the Akhbari. The latter change made the ulama "the primary educators" of society, dispensers most of the justice, overseers social welfare, and collectors of its funding (the zakat and khums religious taxes, managers of the "huge" waqf mortmains and other properties), and generally in control of activities that in modern states are left to the government. The Usuli ulama were "frequently courted and even paid by rulers" but, as the nineteenth century progressed, also came into conflict with them.

=== Era of colonialism and industrialization ===
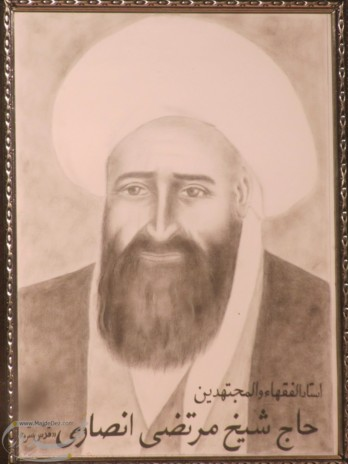
Ayatullah Sheikh Murtadha al-Ansari (Persian: مرتضی انصاری شوشتری; 1781 – 1864) was an Usuli Shia jurist who was the first scholar universally recognized as supreme authority in matters of Shi'i law, because of the modern printing press.

End of nineteenth century marked the end of the Islamic Middle Ages. New technological advances in printing press, telegraph and railways, etc., along with political reforms brought major social changes and the institution of nation-state started to take shape.

==== Conditions under the Qajars ====
In the late 19th century, like most of the Muslim world, Iran suffered from foreign (European) intrusion and exploitation, military weakness, lack of cohesion, corruption. Under the Qajar dynasty (1789–1925), foreign (Western) mass-manufactured products, undercut the products of the bazaar, bankrupting seller, cheap foreign wheat impoverish farmers. The lack of a standing army and inferior military technology, meant loss of land and indemnity to Russia. Lack of good governance meant "'large tracts of fertile land" went to waste.

Perhaps worst of all the indignities Iran suffered from the superior militaries of European powers were "a series of commercial capitulations." In 1872, Nasir al-Din Shah negotiated a concession granting a British citizen control over Persian roads, telegraphs, mills, factories, extraction of resources, and other public works in exchange for a fixed sum and 60% of net revenue. This concession was rolled back after bitter local opposition. Other concessions to the British included giving the new Imperial Bank of Persia exclusive rights to issue banknotes, and opening up the Karun River to navigation.

==== Concessions and the 1891–1892 Tobacco protest ====
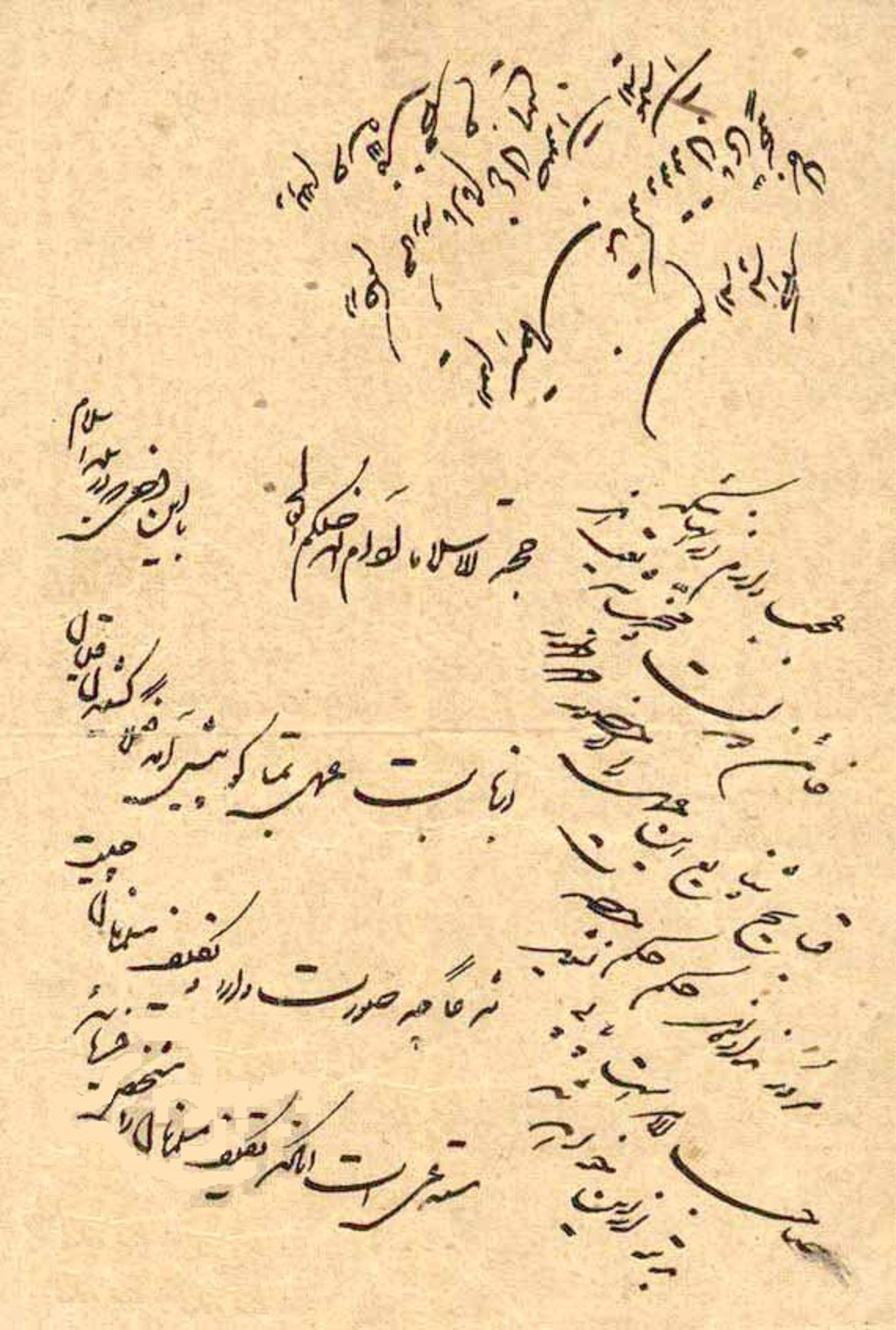
Tobacco Protest verdict issued by Shirazi in 1891

The Tobacco protest of 1891–1892 was "the first mass nationwide popular movement in Iran", and described as a "dress rehearsal for the ... Constitutional Revolution."

In March 1890 Naser al-Din Shah granted a concession to an Englishman for a 50-year monopoly over the distribution and exportation of tobacco. Iranians cultivated a variety of tobacco "much prized in foreign markets" that was not grown elsewhere, and the arrangement threatened the job security of a significant portion of the Iranian population—hundreds of thousands in agriculture and the bazaars.

This led to unprecedented nationwide protest erupting first among the bazaari, then, in December 1891, the most important religious authority in Iran, marja'-e taqlid Mirza Hasan Shirazi, issued a fatwa declaring the use of tobacco to be tantamount to war against the Hidden Imam. Bazaars shut down, Iranians stopped smoking tobacco,

The protest demonstrated to the Iranians "for the first time" that it was possible to defeat the Shah and foreign interests. And the coalition of the tobacco boycott formed "a direct line ... culminating in the Constitutional Revolution" and arguably the Iranian Revolution as well, according to Historian Nikki Keddie.

Whether the protest demonstrated that Iran could not be free of foreign exploitation with a corrupt, antiquated dictatorship; or whether it showed that it was Islamic clerics (and not secular thinkers/leaders) that had the moral integrity and popular influence to lead Iran against corrupt monarchs and the foreign exploitation they allowed, was disputed. Historian Ervand Abrahamian points out that Shirazi, "stressed that he was merely opposed to bad court advisers and that he would withdraw from politics once the hated agreement was canceled."

=== 1905–1911 Iranian Constitutional Revolution ===
As in other parts of the Muslim world, the question of how to strengthen the homeland against foreign encroachment and exploitation divided religious scholars and intellectuals. While many Iranians saw constitutional representative government as a necessary step, conservative clerics (like Khomeini and Fazlullah Nouri) saw it as a British plot to undermine sharia, and part of foreign encroachment concerned Iranians were trying to protect Islam against.

The Constitutional Revolution began in 1905 with protest against a foreign director of customs (a Belgian) enforcing "with bureaucratic rigidity" the tariff collections to pay (in large part) for a loan to another foreign source (Russians) that financed the shah's (Mozaffar ad-Din Shah Qajar) extravagant tour of Europe.

There were two different majlis (parliaments) endorsed by the leading clerics of Najaf – Akhund Khurasani, Mirza Husayn Tehrani and Shaykh Abdullah Mazandarani; in between there was a coup by the shah (Mohammad Ali Shah Qajar) against the constitutional government, a short civil war, and a deposing of that shah some months later.

It ended in December 1911 when deputies of the Second Majlis, suffering from "internal dissension, apathy of the masses, antagonisms from the upper class, and open enmity from Britain and Russia", were "roughly" expelled from the Majlis and threatened with death if they returned by "the shah's cabinet, backed by 12,000 Russian troops".

The political base of the constitutionalist movement to control the power of the shah was an alliance of the ulama, liberal and radical intellectuals, and the bazaar. But the alliance was based on common enemies rather than common goals. The ulama sought "to extend their own power and to have Shi'i Islam more strictly enforced"; the liberals and radicals desired "greater political and social democracy and economic development"; and the bazaaris "to restrict favored foreign economic status and competition".

Working to undermine the constitution and "exploit the divisions within the ranks of the reformers" were the shah Mohammad Ali, and court cleric Sheikh Fazlullah Nouri, the leader of the anti-constitutionalists during the revolution.

Khomeini, (though only a child at the time of the revolution), asserted later that the constitution of 1906 was the work of (Iranian) agents of imperialist Britain, conspiring against Islam who "were instructed by their masters to take advantage of the idea of constitutionalism in order to deceive the people and conceal the true nature of their political crimes".

"At the beginning of the constitutional movement, when people wanted to write laws and draw up a constitution, a copy of the Belgian legal code was borrowed from the Belgian embassy and a handful of individuals (whose names I do not wish to mention here) used it as the basis for the constitution they then wrote, supplementing its deficiencies with borrowings from the French and British legal codes. True, they added some of the ordinances of Islam in order to deceive the people, but the basis of the laws that were now thrust upon the people was alien and borrowed."

On the other hand, Mirza Sayyed Mohammad Tabatabai, a cleric and leader of pro-constitutional faction, saw the constitutional fight against the shah as tied to patriotism and patriotism tied to Shi'i Islam:

"The Shiʿite state is confined to Persia, and their [i.e., the Shiʿites'] prestige and prosperity depended upon it. Why have you permitted the ruin of Persia and the utter humiliation of the Shiʿite state? ... You may reply that the mullahs did not allow [Persia to be saved]. This is not credible. ... I can foresee that my country (waṭan), my stature and prestige, my service to Islam are about to fall into the hands of enemies and all my stature gone. As long as I breathe, therefore, I will strive for the preservation of this country, be it at the cost of my life."

==== Fazlullah Nouri ====
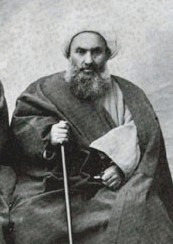
Sheikh Fazlollah Nouri (d. 1909)

If praise and official histories from the Islamic Republic of Iran can stand in for the heroes of Islamist/Fundamentalist Shi'ism, Sheikh Fazlullah Nouri (Persian: فضل‌الله نوری) is the Fundamentalist hero of the era. He was praised by Jalal Al-e-Ahmad the author of Gharbzadegi, and by Khomeini as an "heroic figure", and some believe his own objections to constitutionalism and a secular government were influenced by Nuri's objections to the 1907 constitution. He was called the "Islamic movement's first martyr in contemporary Iran", and honored to have an expressway named after him and postage stamps issued for him (the only figure of the Constitutional Revolution to be so honored).

Nouri declared the new constitution contrary to sharia law. Like Islamists decades later, preached the idea of sharia as a complete code of social life. In his newspaper Ruznamih-i-Shaikh Fazlullah, and published leaflets to spread anti-constitutional propaganda; and proclaim sentiments such as

Shari'a covers all regulations of government, and specifies all obligations and duties, so the needs of the people of Iran in matters of law are limited to the business of government, which, by reason of universal accidents, has become separated from Shari'a. ... Now the people have thrown out the law of the Prophet and have set up their own law instead.

He led direct action against his opponents, such as an around-the-clock sit-in in the Shah Abdul Azim shrine by a large group of followers, from 21 June 1907, until 16 September 1907; recruiting mercenaries to harass the supporters of democracy, and leading a mob towards Tupkhanih Square 22 December 1907 to attack merchants and loot stores.

But the sincerity of his religious beliefs has been questioned. Nouri was a wealthy, well-connected court official responsible for conducting marriages and contracts. Before opposing the idea of democratic reform he had been one of the leaders of the constitutional movement, but reversed his political stance after the coronation of Muhammad Ali Shah Qajar, who unlike his father Mozaffar al-Din Shah, opposed constitutional monarchy. He took money and gave support to foreign (Russian) interests in Iran, while warning Iranians of the spread of foreign ideas.

Furthermore, Nouri was an "Islamic traditionalist" or Fundamentalist rather than an Islamist. He opposed the Constitutionalists concept of limiting the powers of the monarchy, but not because he wanted monarchy abolished (like Khomeini and his followers) but because "obedience to the monarchy was a divine obligation". Monarchy was an Islamic institution and the monarch was accountable to no one other than God and any attempt to call him to account was apostasy from Islam, a capital crime.

Also, unlike later Islamists, he preached against modern learning. Democracy was un-Islamic because it would lead to the "teaching of chemistry, physics and foreign languages", and result in spread of atheism; female education because girls' schools were "brothels". Other liberal ideas he opposed included allocation of funds for modern industry, freedom of press, and equal rights for non-Muslims.

Fazlullah Nouri was hanged by the constitutional revolutionaries on 31 July 1909 as a traitor, for playing pivotal role in coup d'état of Mohammad Ali Shah Qajar and for "the murder of leading constitutionalists" by virtue of his denouncing them as "atheists, heretics, apostates, and secret Babis"—charges he knew would incite pious Muslims to violence. The Shah had fled to Russia.

==== Religious supporters of the constitution ====
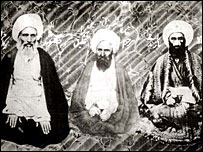
The three Ayatullahs: (left to right) Akhund Khurasani, Mirza Husayn Tehrani and Abdallah Mazandarani

There was no shortage of Islamic scholars in support of the constitution. Acting as a legitimising force for the constitution were three of the highest level clerics (marja') at the time—Akhund Khurasani, Mirza Husayn Tehrani and Shaykh Abdullah Mazandarani—who defended constitutional monarchy in the period of occultation by invoking the Quranic command of 'enjoining good and forbidding wrong'. In doing so they linked opposition to the constitutional movement to 'a war against the Imam of the Age' (a very severe condemnation in Shi'i Islam), and when parliament came under attack from Nuri issued fatawa forbidding his involvement in politics (30 December 1907), and then calling for his expulsion (1908). In supporting the constitution, the three marja' established a model of religious secularity in government in the absence of Imam, that still prevails in (some) Shi'i seminaries.

Nouri called on Shi'a to ignore the higher ranking of the marja' (the basis of Usuli Shi'ism) and their fatawa; he insisted that Shi'a were all "witnesses" that the marja' were obviously wrong in supporting the parliament. Another cleric, Mirza Ali Aqa Tabrizi, defended the marja' ("the sources of emulation") and their "clear fatwas that uphold the necessity of the Constitution".

Akhund aka Muhammad Kazim Khurasani, Muhammad Hossein Naini, Shaykh Isma'il Mahallati

Some of the religious arguments offered for the constitution were that rather than having superior status that gave them the right to rule over ordinary people, the role of scholars/jurists was to act as "warning voices in society" and criticize the officials who were not carrying out their responsibilities properly. and to provide religious guidance in personal affairs of believers.

Until the infallible Imam returned to establish an Islamic system of governance with himself governing, "human experience and careful reflection" indicated that democracy brought a set of "limitations and conditions" on the head of state and government officials keeping them within "boundaries that the laws and religion of every nation determines", "reducing the tyranny of state", and preventing the corruption of power. All this meant it was "obligatory to give precedence" to this "lesser evil" in governance.

Muhammad Hossein Naini, a close associate and student of Behbahani, agreed that in the absence of Imam Mahdi, all governments are doomed to be imperfect and unjust, and therefore people had to prefer the bad (democracy) over the worse (absolutism). He opposed both "tyrannical Ulema" and radical majoritarianism, supporting features of liberal democracy, such as equal rights, freedom of speech, separation of powers.

Another student of Akhund who too raised to the rank of Marja, Shaykh Isma'il Mahallati, wrote a treatise "al-Liali al-Marbuta fi Wajub al-Mashruta" (Persian: اللئالی المربوطه‌ فی وجوب المشروطه‌). during the occultation of the twelfth Imam, the governments can either be imperfectly just or oppressive. Limiting the sovereign's power through a constitution means limiting tyranny. Since it was the duty of the believer to fight injustice, they ought to work to strengthen the democratic process—reforming the economic system, modernizing the military, establishing an educational system. At the same time, constitutional government was the option of both "Muslims or unbelievers".

=== Reza Shah and the Pahlavi dynasty ===
While the Constitutional Revolution did not succeed, the secular, modernizing authoritarianism of the two Pahlavi shahs had more success, ruling from Reza Shah's seizure of power in 1921, to his son's overthrow in 1979, and can be said to have combatting Iran's backwardness. Reza Shah, leader of the Iranian Cossack Brigade before his coup, was a secular, nationalist dictator in the vein of Mustafa Kemal Atatürk of Turkey. Under his rule Iran was militarily united, a 100,000-man standing army created, uniform Persian culture emphasized, and ambitious development projects undertaken: 1300 km railway linking the Persian Gulf with the Caspian Sea was built, a university, and free, compulsory primary education for both boys and girls was established while private religious schools were shut down.

While his modernization efforts were significant, he was the bete noire of the clergy and pious Iranians, (not least of all Ruhollah Khomeini). His government required all non-clerical men to wear Western clothes, encouraged women to abandon hijab. He expropriated land and real estate from shrines at Mashhad and Qom, to help finance secular education, "build a modern hospital, improve the water supply of the city, and underwrite industrial enterprises." Khomeini focused his revolutionary campaign on the Pahlavi shah and all of his government's alleged shortcomings.

=== Fada'ian-e Islam ===
Fada'ian-e Islam (in English, literally "Self-Sacrificers of Islam") was a Shia fundamentalist group in Iran founded in 1946 and crushed in 1955. The Fada'ian "did not compare either in rank, number or popular base" with the mainstream conservative and progressive tendencies among the clergy, but killed a number of important people, and at least one source (Sohrab Behdad) credits the group and Navvab Safavi with influence on the Islamic Revolution. According to Encyclopædia Iranica,

"there are important similarities between much of the Fedāʾīān's basic views and certain principles and actions of the Islamic Republic of Iran: the Fedāʾīān and Ayatollah Khomeini were in accord on issues such as the role of clerics [judges, educators and moral guides to the people], morality and ethics, Islamic justice [full application of Islamic law, abolition of all non-Islamic laws and prohibition of all forms of immoral behavior], the place of the underclass [to be raised up], the rights of women and religious minorities [to be kept down], and attitudes toward foreign powers [dangerous conspirators to be kept out]."

In addition, leading Islamic Republic figures such as Ali Khamenei, (the current Supreme Leader), and Akbar Hashemi Rafsanjani, (former president, former head of the Assembly of Experts, and former head of Expediency Discernment Council), have indicated what an "important formative impact of Nawwāb's charismatic appeal in their early careers and anti-government activities".

==== Navvab Safavi ====
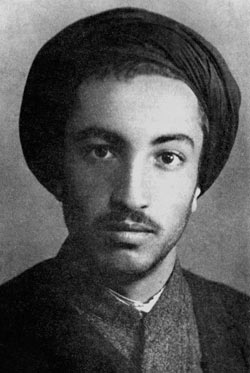
Sayyid Mojtaba Mir-Lohi, known as Navvab Safavi

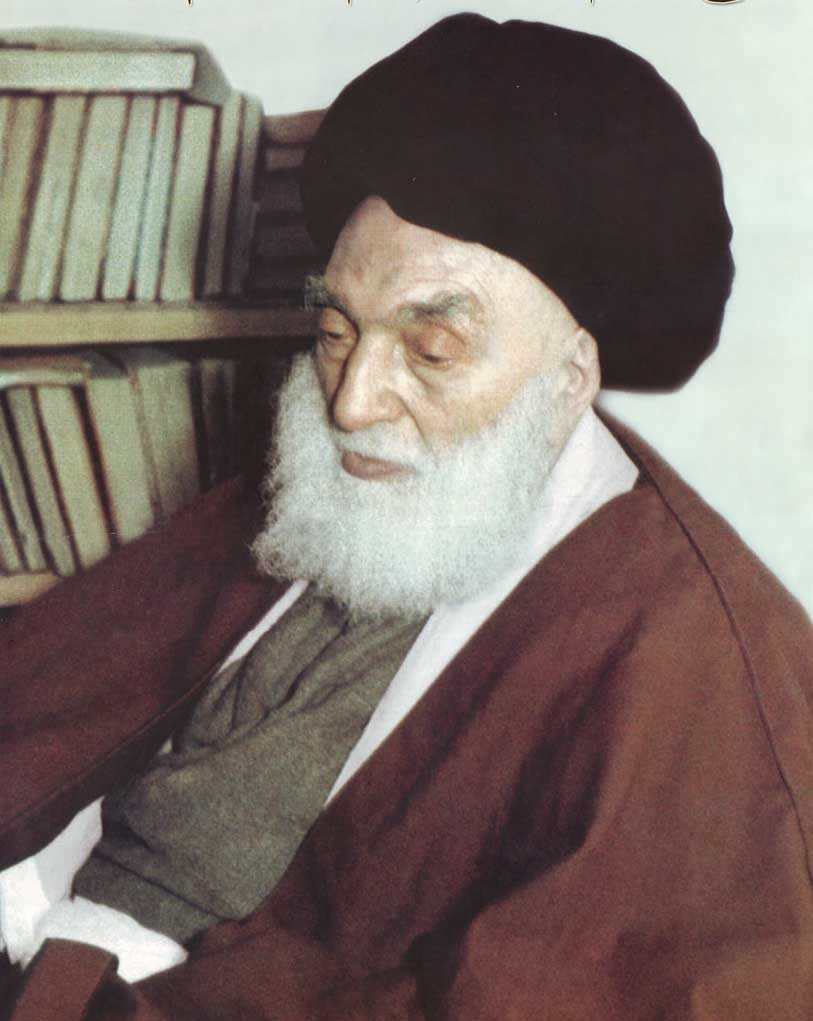
Ayatollah Sayyid Hossein Ali Tababataei Borujerdi (Persian: آیت الله العظمی سید حسین طباطبایی بروجردی; March 1875 – 30 March 1961) was a student of Akhund Khurasani.

Sayyid Mojtaba Mir-Lohi (Persian: سيد مجتبی میرلوحی, c. 1924 – 18 January 1956), more commonly known as Navvab Safavi (Persian: نواب صفوی), emerged on political scene around 1945 when after only two years of study, he left the seminaries of Najaf to found the Fada'iyan-e Islam, recruiting frustrated youth from suburbs of Tehran for acts of terror, proclaiming:

"We are alive and God, the revengeful, is alert. The blood of the destitute has long been dripping from the fingers of the selfish pleasure seekers, who are hiding, each with a different name and in a different colour, behind black curtains of oppression, thievery and crime. Once in a while the divine retribution puts them in their place, but the rest of them do not learn a lesson ..."

In 1950, at 26 years of age, he presented his idea of an Islamic State in a treatise, Barnameh-ye Inqalabi-ye Fada'ian-i Islam. Despite his hatred of interfering infidel foreign powers, his group attempted to kill prime minister Muhammad Musaddiq, and he congratulated the shah after the 1953 coup deposed Mosaddegh:

"The country was saved by Islam and with the power of faith ... The Shah and prime minister and ministers have to be believers in and promoters of, shi'ism, and the laws that are in opposition to the divine laws of God ... must be nullified ... The intoxicants, the shameful exposure and carelessness of women, and sexually provocative music ... must be done away with and the superior teachings of Islam ... must replace them."

He enjoyed a close enough association with the government to be able to attend a 1954 Islamic Conference in Jordan and traveled to Egypt and meet Sayyid Qutb. He clashed with Shia Marja', Hossein Borujerdi, who rejected his ideas and questioned him about the robberies that his organization committed on gun point, Safavi replied:

"Our intention is to borrow from people. What we take is for establishing a government based on the model of Imam Ali's government. Our goal is sacred and prior to these tools. When we established an Aliid government-like state, then we give people their money back."

Fada'ian-e Islam called for excommunication of Borujerdi and the defrocking of religious scholars who opposed their idea of Islam, (Note: A practice alien to Shi'i Islam but realized after establishment of the Islamic Republic of Iran for Ayatullah Mohammad Kazem Shariatmadari and other clerics through Special Clerical Court.) Navvab Safavi did not like Broujerdi's idea of Shia-Sunni rapprochement (Persian: تقریب), he advocated Shia-Sunni unification (Persian: وحدت) under Islamist agenda. Fada'ian-e Islam carried out assassinations of Abdolhossein Hazhir, Haj Ali Razmara and Ahmad Kasravi. On 22 November 1955, after an unsuccessful attempt to assassinate Hosein Ala', Navvab Safavi was arrested and sentenced to death on 25 December 1955 under terrorism charges, along with three other comrades. The organization dispersed but after the death of Ayatullah Borujerdi, the Fada'ian-e Islam sympathizers found a new leader in Ayatullah Ruhollah Khomeini who appeared on political horizon through the June 1963 riots in Qom. In 1965, prime minister Hassan Ali Mansur was assassinated by the group.

=== Mohammad Mosaddeq and the 1953 coup ===
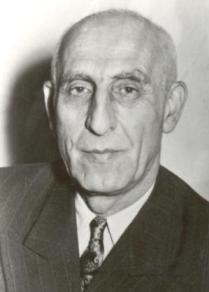
Mohammad Mosaddegh

Mohammad Mosaddeq was prime minister of Iran from 1951 to 1953 and led the nationalization of the British owned Anglo-Iranian Oil Company. Originally he and nationalization had mass support, with a core of "modern or politically literate middle-income or underprivileged segments of the urban population", but expanding to include "considerable support" from traditional sectors such as "guilds of restaurant owners, coffee and teahouse owners". He was overthrown on 19 August 1953, aided by the United States and the United Kingdom, and "directly or indirectly helped" by sections of the military, landlords, conservative politicians, and "the bulk of the religious establishment".

According to Fakhreddin Azimi, in the "modern Iranian historical and political consciousness" the 1953 coup "occupies an immensely significant place". The coup is "widely seen as a rupture, a watershed, a turning point when imperialist domination, overcoming a defiant challenge, reestablished itself, not only by restoring an enfeebled monarch but also by ensuring that the monarchy would assume an authoritarian and antidemocratic posture."

Critics hold Mosaddegh and his supporters responsible for failing "to create an organization capable of mobilizing broad support for their movement"; refusing "to take the difficult steps necessary to settle the oil dispute; and not acting "forcefully against their various opponents, either before the coup or while it was underway."

Mosaddeq was to his supporters struggling to "overcome orchestrated oppositional machinations through a consistently defiant, transparent, morally unassailable, principle-driven stance." In Iranian domestic politics, the legacy of the coup was the firmly held belief by many Iranians "that the United States bore responsibility for Iran's return to dictatorship, a belief that helps to explain the heavily anti-American character of the revolution in 1978."

Iranians felt exploited by the British, whose Anglo-Iranian Oil Company paid Iran royalties of $45 million for its oil in 1950, while paying the British government "taxes of $142 million on profits from that crude and its downstream products." The Iranian operations of the Anglo-Iranian Oil Company (English owned but operating in Iran) was nationalized in 1951. Mosaddeq stated

"Our long years of negotiations with foreign countries... have yielded no results this far. With the oil revenues we could meet our entire budget and combat poverty, disease, and backwardness among our people. Another important consideration is that by the elimination of the power of the British company, we would also eliminate corruption and intrigue, by means of which the internal affairs of our country have been influenced. Once this tutelage has ceased, Iran will have achieved its economic and political independence. The Iranian state prefers to take over the production of petroleum itself. The company should do nothing else but return its property to the rightful owners. The nationalization law provide that 25% of the net profits on oil be set aside to meet all the legitimate claims of the company for compensation... It has been asserted abroad that Iran intends to expel the foreign oil experts from the country and then shut down oil installations. Not only is this allegation absurd; it is utter invention..."

The AIOC management "immediately staged an economic boycott, with backing from the other major international oil companies, while the British government started an aggressive, semi-covert campaign to destabilize the Mosaddeq regime." The United States, the leader of the "Free world" bloc in the Cold War was "ostensible neutral", but allied with the UK and worried about the influence of Iran's huge neighbor and leader of the communist bloc, the Soviet Union, the Truman administration "quietly abided by the boycott". As U.S. worries over Iran's political and economic deterioration increased, and that the country's economy was "near collapse", which would cause some combination of increased dependence on the Tudeh party leading to its eventual takeover, and or "collapse followed by a communist takeover."

Iran had difficulty finding trained non-British workers to run the industry and buyers to sell the oil to. but the government was not near bankruptcy nor inflation unmanageable.

=== Demographic changes ===
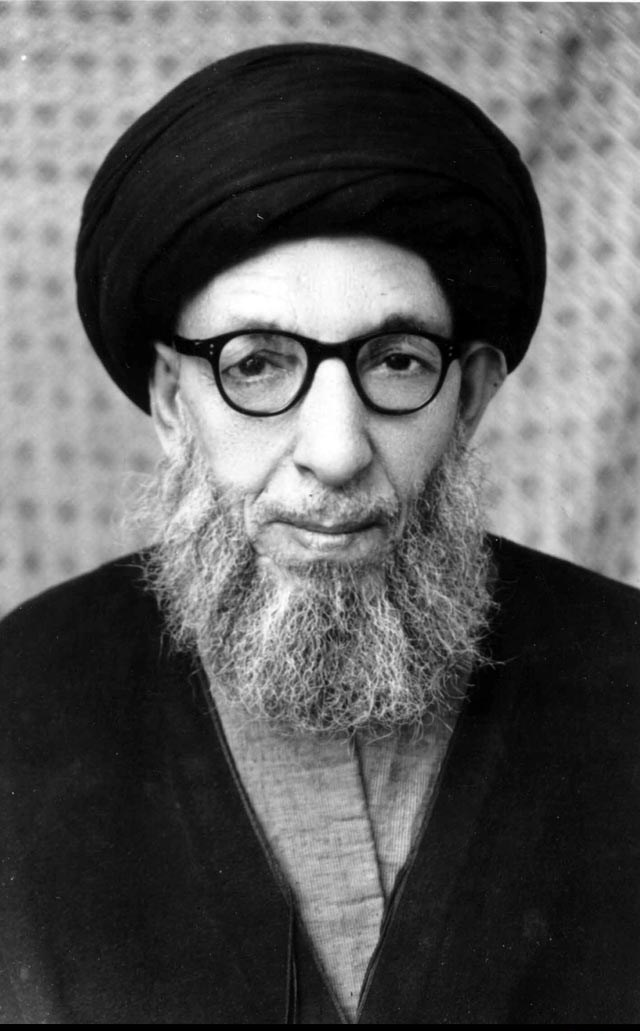
Sayyid Muhsin al-Hakim (Arabic: سيد محسن الطباطبائي الحكيم; 31 May 1889 – 2 June 1970) was a student of Akhund Khurasani.

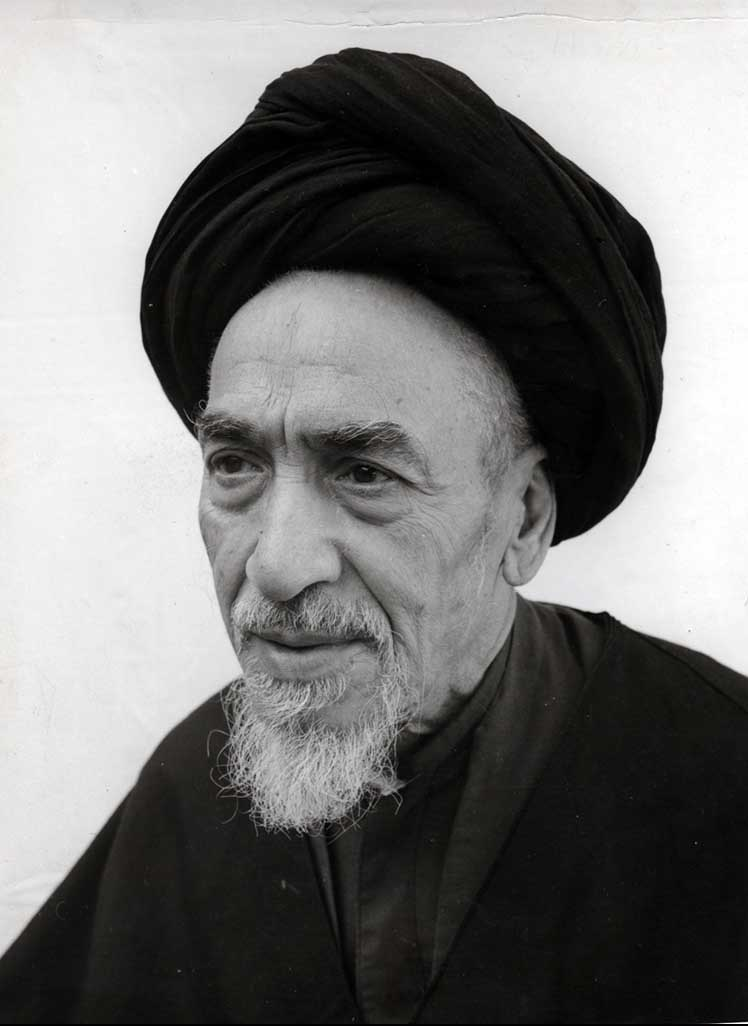
Ayatullah Sayyid Mohammad Hadi al-Milani (Persian: سيد محمد هادى حسينى ميلانی; July 1, 1895 – August 7, 1975) was a student of Ayatullah Na'ini.

Iran was undergoing a fast societal change through urbanization. In 1925 Iran was a thinly populated country with a population of 12 millions, 21% living in urban centers and Tehran was a walled city of 200,000 inhabitants. Pahlavi dynasty started major projects of converting the capital into a metropolis. Between 1956 and 1966, the rapid industrialization coupled with land reforms and improved health systems, building of dams and roads, released some three million peasants from countryside into the cities. This resulted in rapid changes in their lives, decline of traditional feudal values, and industrialization, changing the socio-political atmosphere and created new questions. By 1976, 47% of Iran's total population was concentrated in large cities. Between 42 and 50% of the population of Tehran lived on rent, 10% owned private car and 82.7% of all national companies were registered in the Capital.

A less complimentary view of Nikki Keddie is that,

"especially after 1961, the crown encouraged the rapid growth of consumer-goods industries, pushed the acquisition of armaments even beyond what Iran's growing oil-rich budgets could stand, and instituted agrarian reforms that emphasized government control and investment in large, mechanized farms. Displaced peasants and tribespeople fled to the cities, where they formed a discontented sub-proletariat. People were torn from ancestral ways, the gap between the rich and the poor grew, corruption was rampant and well known, and the secret police, with its arbitrary arrests and use of torture, turned Iranians of all levels against the regime. And the presence and heavy influence of foreigners provided major, further aggravation.

Rapid urbanization in Iran had created a modern educated, salaried middle class (as opposed to a traditional class of bazaari merchants). Among them were writers who started to criticize traditional interpretations of religion, and readers who agreed with them. In one of his first books, Kashf al-Asrar, Khomeini attacked these liberal critics and writers as a "brainless" treacherous "lot" whose teeth the believers must 'smash ... with their iron fist’ and heads they should 'trample upon ... with courageous strides’. Furthermore

Government can only be legitimate when it accepts the rule of God and the rule of God means the implementation of the Sharia. All laws that are contrary to the Sharia must be dropped because only the law of God will stay valid and immutable in the face of changing times.

=== Cold War literature ===
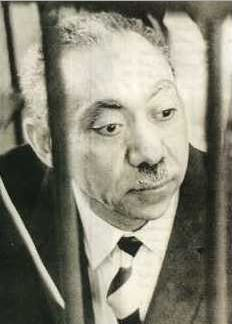
Sayyid Qutb (Arabic: سيد إبراهيم حسين قطب; 1906 – 1966) was an Egyptian Sunni Islamist author and a leading member of the Egyptian Muslim Brotherhood in the 1950s and 1960s.

Following World War II, Western capitalist and other anti-Communist leaders were alarmed at how large, centralized and powerful the Eastern bloc of countries ruled by Communist parties (now including China), had become. As the peoples of Western colonial empires were given independence, the idea that poor, formerly colonialized countries naturally aligned with the Socialist Bloc, should follow socialist economic development models, and keep their distance from former colonizers, alarmed anti-communists still further. In the Muslim world this led to an effort to compete with Communist propaganda and the revolutionary enthusiasm of Marxist, anti-imperialist ideas by promoting works by the original Islamist thinkers, Sayyid Qutb and Abul A'la Al-Maududi (known to be deeply anti-Communist), through the Muslim World League with Saudi patronage, translating them into Farsi and other languages.

Their books were translated into Persian/Farsi, and helped to shape the ideology of Shi'i Islamists. Sayyid Qutb's works enjoyed remarkable popularity in Iran both before and after the revolution. Prominent figures such as current Iranian Supreme Leader Ali Khamenei and his brother Muhammad Khamenei, Aḥmad Aram, Hadi Khosroshahi, etc. translated Qutb's works into Persian. Hadi Khosroshahi was the first person to identify himself as Akhwani Shia. Muhammad Khamenei is currently head of Sadra Islamic Philosophy Research Institute, and holds positions at Al-Zahra University and Allameh Tabataba'i University. According to the National Library and Archives of Iran, 19 works of Sayyid Qutb and 17 works of his brother Muhammad Qutb were translated to Persian and widely circulated in the 1960s. Reflecting on this import of ideas, Ali Khamenei said:

The newly emerged Islamic movement ... had a pressing need for codified ideological foundations ... Most writings on Islam at the time lacked any direct discussions of the ongoing struggles of the Muslim people ... Few individuals who fought in the fiercest skirmishes of that battlefield made up their minds to compensate for this deficiency ... This text was translated with this goal in mind.

Concerned about the post-World War II geo-political expansion of Iran's powerful northern neighbor the Soviet Union, the Shah's regime in Iran tolerated this literature for its anti-Communist value, but an indication that the Western Cold War strategy for the Muslim world was not working out as planned was indicated by the coining of the term "American Islam", in 1952, by one of the authors—Sayyid Qutb—that were being translated with Saudi and Western funding. The term was later adapted by Ayatullah Khomeini after the 1979 Islamist revolution, who proclaimed:

The Islam that America and its allies desire in the Middle East does not resist colonialism and tyranny, but rather resists Communism only. They do not want Islam to govern and can not abide it to rule because when Islam governs, it will raise a different breed of humans and will teach people that it is their duty to develop their power and expel the colonialists ... American Islam is consulted on the issued of birth control, the entry of women into Parliament, and on matters that impair ritual ablutions. However, it is jot consulted on the matter of our social and economic affairs and fiscal system, nor is it consulted on political and national affairs and our connections with colonialism.

Maududi appreciated the power of modern state and its coercive potential that could be used for moral policing. He saw Islam as a religious-state that sought to mould its citizens and control every private and public expression of their lives, like totalitarian fascist and communist states. Iranian Shi'i Islamists had close links with Maududi's Jamaat-e-Islami, and after the 1963 riots in Qom, the Jamaat's periodical Tarjuman ul-Quran published a piece criticizing the Shah and supporting the Islamist currents in Iran.

In 1984 the Iranian authorities honoured Sayyid Qutb by issuing a postage stamp showing him behind the bars during trial.

=== Khomeini's early opposition to the shah ===
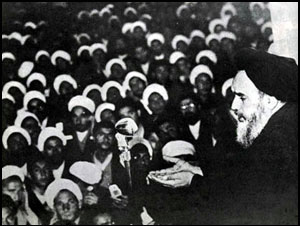
Khomeini's speech against the Shah in Qom, 1964

White Revolution

In January 1963, the Shah of Iran announced the "White Revolution", a six-point programme of reform calling for land reform, nationalization of the forests, the sale of state-owned enterprises to private interests, electoral changes to enfranchise women and allow non-Muslims to hold office, profit-sharing in industry, and a literacy campaign in the nation's schools. Some of these initiatives were regarded as Westernizing trends by traditionalists and as a challenge to the Shi'a ulama (religious scholars). Khomeini denounced them as "an attack on Islam", and persuaded other senior marjas of Qom to decree a boycott of the referendum on the White Revolution. When Khomeini issued a declaration denouncing both the Shah and his reform plan, the Shah took an armored column to Qom, and delivered a speech harshly attacking the ulama as a class.

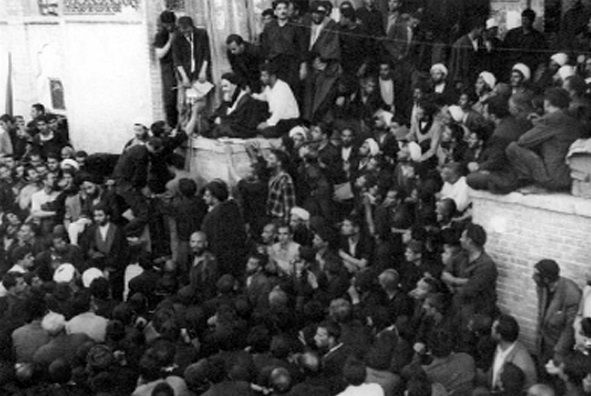
Khomeini denouncing the Shah on 'Ashura (3 June 1963)

After his arrest in Iran following the 1963 riots, leading Ayatullahs had issued a statement declaring Ayatullah Khomeini a legitimate Marja. This is widely thought to have prevented his execution.

==== 15 Khordad Uprising ====
In June of that year Khomeini delivered a speech at the Feyziyeh madrasah drawing parallels between the Sunni Muslim caliph Yazid—who is perceived as a 'tyrant' by Shias and responsible for the death of Imam Ali—and the Shah, denouncing the Shah as a "wretched, miserable man," and warning him that if he did not change his ways the day would come when the people would no longer tolerate him. Two days later, Khomeini was arrested and transferred to Tehran. Following this action, there were three days of major riots throughout Iran, known as the Movement of 15 Khordad. Although they were crushed within days by the police and military, the Shah's regime was taken by surprise by the size of the demonstrations, and they established the importance and power of (Shia) religious opposition to the Shah, and the importance of Khomeini as a political and religious leader.

==== Opposition to capitulation ====
Khomeini attacked the Shah not only for the White Revolution but for violating the constitution, the spread of moral corruption, submission to the United States and Israel, and in October 1964 for "capitulations" or diplomatic immunity granted by the Shah to American military personnel in Iran. The "capitulations" aka "status-of-forces agreement", stipulating that U.S. servicemen facing criminal charges stemming from a deployment in Iran, were to be tried before a U.S. court martial, not an Iranian court.

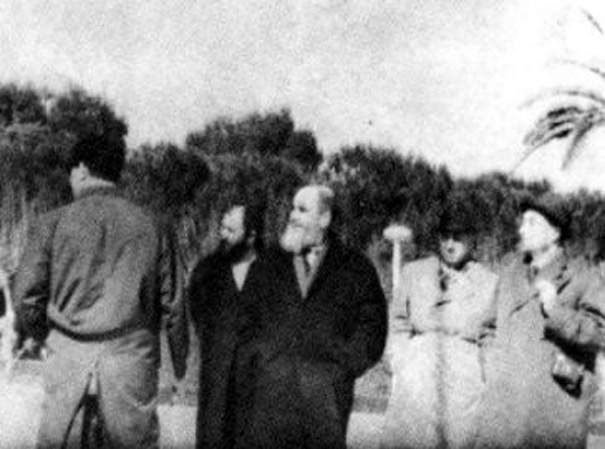
Khomeini in exile at Bursa, Turkey without clerical dress

In November 1964, after his latest denunciation, Khomeini was arrested and held for half a year. Upon his release, Khomeini was brought before Prime Minister Hassan Ali Mansur, who tried to convince him to apologize for his harsh rhetoric and going forward, cease his opposition to the Shah and his government. When Khomeini refused, Mansur slapped him in the face in a fit of rage. Two months later, Mansur was assassinated on his way to parliament. Four members of the Fadayan-e Islam, a Shia militia sympathetic to Khomeini, were later executed for the murder.

==== Exile ====
Khomeini spent more than 14 years in exile, mostly in the holy Iraqi city of Najaf (from October 1965 to 1978, when he was expelled by then-Vice President Saddam Hussein). In Najaf, Khomeini took advantage of the Iraq-Iran conflict and launched a campaign against the Pahlavi regime in Iran. Saddam Hussein gave him access to the Persian broadcast of Radio Baghdad to address Iranians and made it easier for him to receive visitors.

By the time Khomeini was expelled from Najaf, discontent with the Shah had intensified. Khomeini visited Neauphle-le-Château, a suburb of Paris, France, on a tourist visa on 6 October 1978. (Note: According to Alexandre de Marenches, chief of External Documentation and Counter-Espionage Service (now known as the DGSE), the Shah did not ask France to expel Khomeini for fear that the cleric should move to Syria or Libya.)

In May 2005, Ali Khamenei defined the reformist principle-ism (Osoulgaraiee eslah-talabaaneh) of his Islamic state in opposition to the perceived hostility of the West:

"While adhering to and preserving our basic principles, we should try to constantly rectify and improve our methods. This is the meaning of real reformism. But U.S. officials define reformism as opposition to Islam and the Islamic system."

In January 2007, a new parliamentary faction announced its formation. The former Osulgarayan ("principlist") faction split due to "lack of consensus" on Mahmoud Ahmadinejad's policies. The new faction was named "Faction of creative principlists" which is critical of Ahmadinejad's neo-principlist policies and to reject conservatism on matters related to government. The main leaders of the faction are Emad Afroogh, Mohammad Khoshchehreh, Saeed Aboutaleb and MP Sobhani.

=== Non-Khomeini sources of Islamism ===
==== Gharbzadegi ====
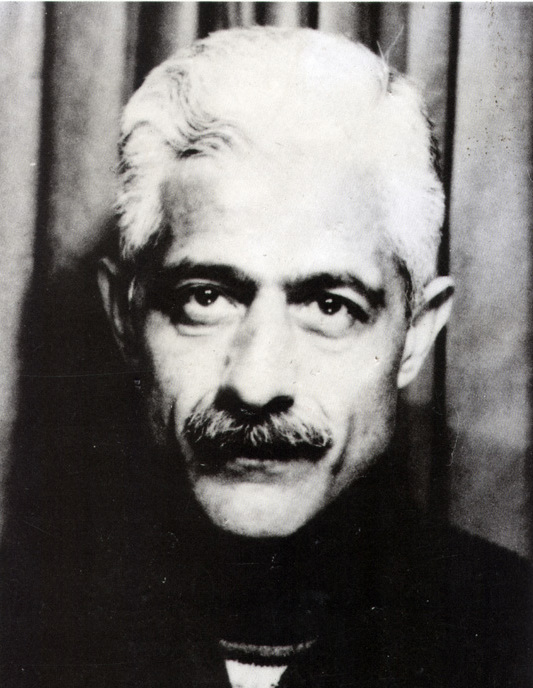
Jalal Al-e-Ahmad

In 1962, Jalal Al-e-Ahmad published a book or pamphlet called of the book Occidentosis (Gharbzadegi): A Plague from the West. Al-e-Ahmad, who was from a deeply religious family but had had a Western education and been a member of the Tudeh (Communist) party, argued that Iran was intoxicated or infatuated (zadegi) with Western (gharb) technology, culture, products, and so had become a victim of the West's "toxins" or disease. The adoption and imitation of Western models and Western criteria in education, the arts, and culture led to the loss of Iranian cultural identity, and a transformation of Iran into a passive market for Western goods and a pawn in Western geopolitics. Al-e-Ahmad "spearheaded" the search by Western educated/secular Iranians for "Islamic roots", and although he advocated a return to Islam his works "contained a strong Marxist flavor and analyzed society through a class perspective."

Al-e-Ahmad "was the only contemporary writer ever to obtain favorable comments from Khomeini", who wrote in a 1971 message to Iranian pilgrims on going on Hajj,

"The poisonous culture of imperialism [is] penetrating to the depths of towns and villages throughout the Muslim world, displacing the culture of the Qur'an, recruiting our youth en masse to the service of foreigners and imperialists..."

At least one historian (Ervand Abrahamian) speculates Al-e-Ahmad may have been an influence on Khomeini's turning away from traditional Shi'i thought towards populism, class struggle and revolution. Fighting Gharbzadegi became part of the ideology of the 1979 Iranian Revolution—the emphasis on nationalization of industry, "self-sufficiency" in economics, independence in all areas of life from both the Western (and Soviet) world. He was also one of the main influences of the later Islamic Republic president Ahmadinejad. The Islamic Republic issued a postage stamp honoring Al-e-Ahmad in 1981.

==== Socialist Shi'ism ====
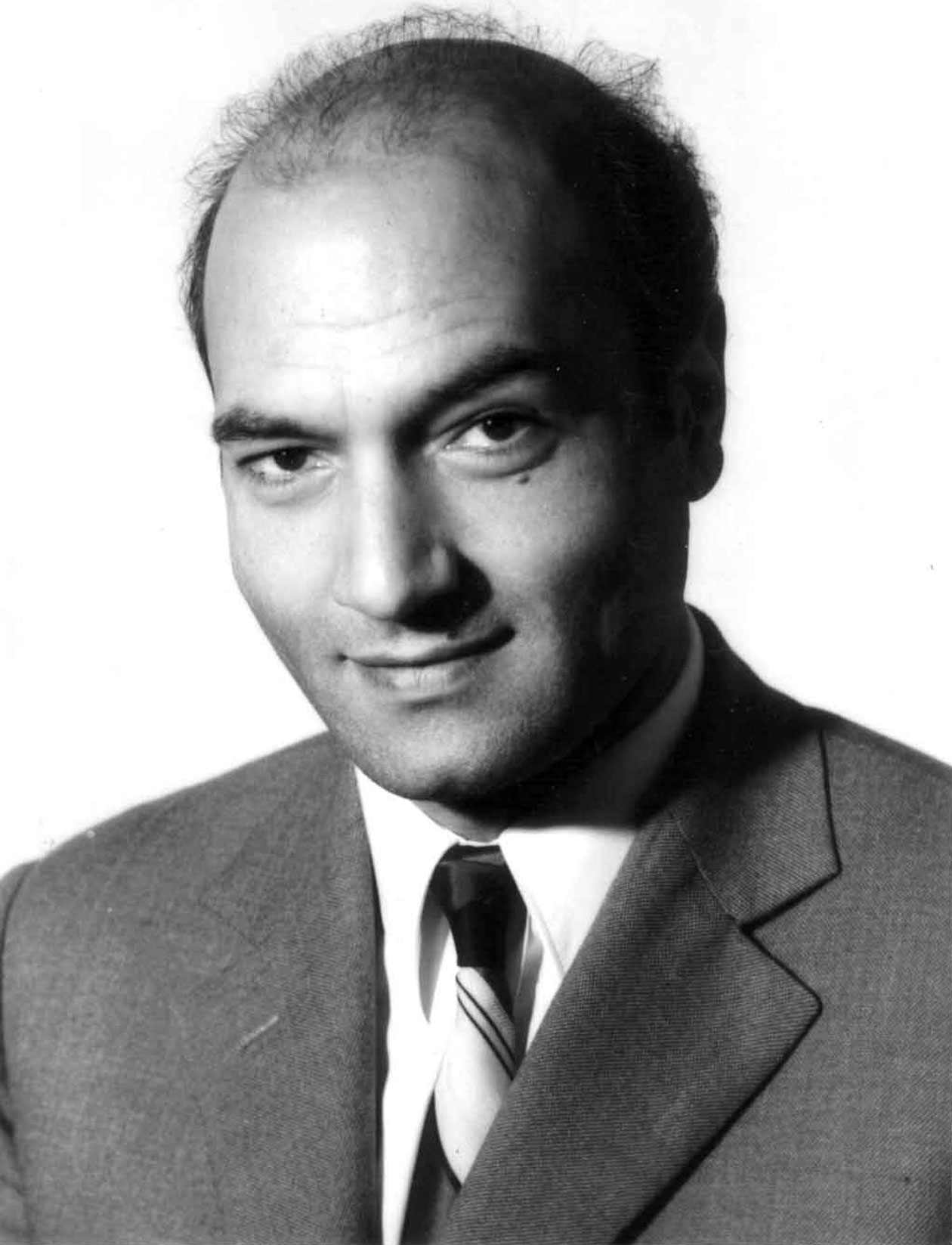
Ali Shariati (Persian: علی شریعتی مزینانی; 1933 – 1977)

One element of Iran's revolution not found in Sunni Islamist movements was what came to be called "Socialist Shi'ism", (also "red Shiism" as opposed to the "black Shiism" of the clerics).

Iran's education system was "substantially superior" to that of its neighbors, and by 1979 had about 175,000 students, 67, 000 studying abroad away from the supervision of its oppressive security force the SAVAK. The early 1970s saw a "blossoming of Marxist groups" around the world including among Iranian post-secondary students.

After one failed uprising, some of the young revolutionaries, realizing that the religious Iranian masses were not relating to Marxist concepts, began projecting "the Messianic expectations of communist and Third World peoples onto Revolutionary Shi'ism.", i.e. socialist Shi'ism. Ali Shariati was "the most outspoken representative of this group", and a figure without equivalent in "fame or influence" in Sunni Islam. He had come from a "strictly religious family" but had studied in Paris and been influenced by the writings of Jean-Paul Sartre, Frantz Fanon and Che Guevara.

Socialist Shia believed Imam Hussein was not just a holy figure but the original oppressed one (muzloun), and his killer, the Sunni Umayyad Caliphate, the "analog" of the modern Iranian people's "oppression by the shah". His killing at Karbala was not just an "eternal manifestation of the truth but a revolutionary act by a revolutionary hero".

Shariati was also a harsh critic of traditional Usuli clergy (including Ayatullah Hadi al-Milani), who he and other leftist Shia believed were standing in the way of the revolutionary potential of the masses, by focusing on mourning and lamentation for the martyrs, awaiting the return of the messiah, when they should have been fighting "against the state injustice begun by Ali and Hussein".

Shariati not only influenced young Iranians and young clerics, he influenced Khomeini. Shariati popularized a saying from the 19th century, 'Every place should be turned into Karbala, every month into Moharram, and every day into Ashara'. Later Khomeini used it as a slogan.

The "phenomenal popularity" of Shari'ati among the "young intelligentsia" helped open up the "modern middle class" to Khomeini. Shari'ati was often anticlerical but Khomeini was able to "win over his followers by being forthright in his denunciations of the monarchy; by refusing to join fellow theologians in criticizing the Husseinieh-i Ershad; by openly attacking the apolitical and the pro-regime `ulama; by stressing such themes as revolution, anti-imperialism, and the radical message of Muharram; and by incorporating into his public declarations such 'Fanonist' terms as the 'mostazafin will inherit the earth', 'the country needs a cultural revolution', and the 'people will dump the exploiters onto the garbage heap of history.'"

Shariati was also influenced by anti-democratic Islamist ideas of Muslim Brotherhood thinkers in Egypt and he tried to meet Muhammad Qutb while visiting Saudi Arabia in 1969. A chain smoker, Shariati died of a heart attack while in self-imposed exile in Southampton, UK on 18 June 1977.

Ayatullah Hadi Milani, the influential Usuli Marja in Mashhad during the 1970s, had issued a fatwa prohibiting his followers from reading Ali Shariati's books and Islamist literature produced by young clerics. This fatwa was followed by similar fatwas from Ayatullah Mar'ashi Najafi, Ayatullah Muhammad Rouhani, Ayatullah Hasan Qomi and others. Ayatullah Khomeini refused to comment.

==== Mahmoud Taleghani ====
Mahmoud Taleghani (1911–1979) was another politically active Iranian Shi'i cleric and contemporary of Khomeini and a leader in his own right of the movement against Shah Mohammad Reza Pahlavi. A founding member of the Freedom Movement of Iran, he has been described as a representative of the tendency of many "Shia clerics to blend Shia with Marxist ideals in order to compete with leftist movements for youthful supporters" during the 1960s and 1970s. a veteran in the struggle against the Pahlavi regime, he was imprisoned on several occasions over the decades, "as a young preacher, as a mid-ranking cleric, and as a senior religious leader just before the revolution," and served a total of a dozen years in prison. In his time in prison he developed connections with leftist political prisoners and the influence of the left on his thinking was reflected in his famous book Islam and Ownership (Islam va Malekiyat) which argued in support of collective ownership "as if it were an article of faith in Islam."

Taleghani was instrumental in "shaping the groundswell movement" that led to the Iranian Revolution and served as the chair of powerful and secret Revolutionary Council during the Islamic Revolution. he was also the first Imam for Friday Prayer in Tehran after the fall of Iran's interim government, In the late July 1979. He clashed with Khomeini in April 1979, warning the leadership against a "return to despotism." After two of his sons were arrested by revolutionary Guards, thousands of his supporters marched in the streets chanting "Taleghani, you are the soul of the revolution! Down with the reactionaries!" Khomeini summoned Taleghani to Qom where he was given a severe criticism after which the press was called and told by Khomeini: "Mr. Taleghani is with us and he is sorry for what happened." Khomeini pointedly did not refer to him as Ayatollah Taleghani.

=== Khomeini-Tradionalist clash in 1970s ===
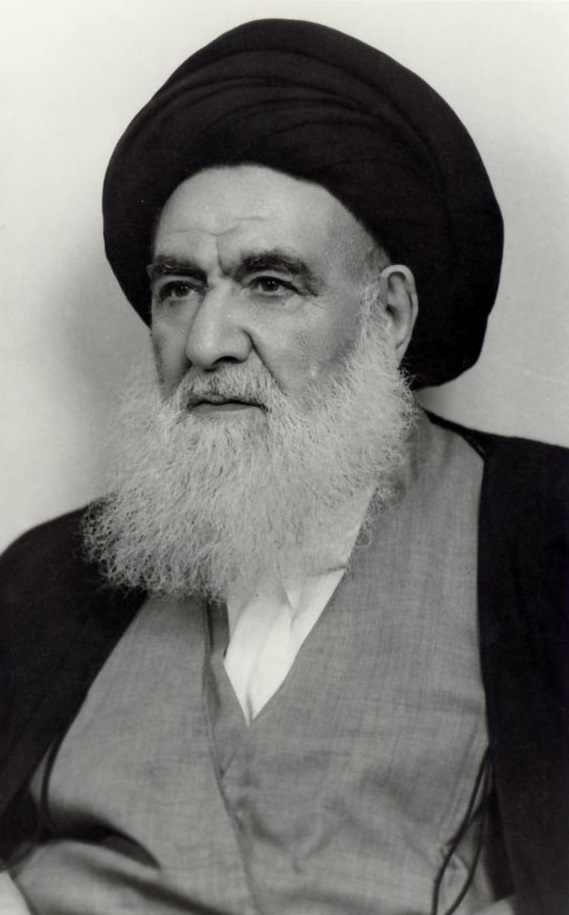
Sayyid Abul Qasim al-Khoei (Persian: سیدابوالقاسم خویی), 1992–1899 was a student of Ayatullah Na'ini.

Ruhollah Khomeini, an ambitious cleric, used to deliver public speeches on gnosis and moral steadfastness. He had studied Ibn Arabi's gnosis and Mulla Sadra's theosophy, and taught and wrote books on it. His keen interest in Plato's ideas, especially those of a Utopian society, had an impact on his political thought as well.

While in exile, Khomeini gave a series of 19 lectures to a group of his students from January 21 to February 8, 1970, on Islamic Government, and elevated Naraqi's idea of Jurist's absolute authority over imitator's personal life to all aspects of social life. Notes of the lectures were soon made into a book that appeared under three different titles: The Islamic Government, Authority of the Jurist, and A Letter from Imam Musavi Kashef al-Gita (to deceive Iranian censors). This short treatise was smuggled into Iran and "widely distributed" to Khomeini supporters before the revolution. It was "the first time a leading Shiite cleric had thrown his full weight as a doctor of the law behind the ideas of modern Islamist intellectuals."

The response from high-level Shi'a clerics to his idea of absolute guardianship of jurist was negative. Grand Ayatollah Abul-Qassim Khoei, the leading Shia ayatollah at the time the book was published rejected Khomeini's argument on the grounds that the authority of jurist in the age of occultation of the Infallible Imam, is limited to the guardianship of orphans and social welfare and most jurists believed there was an "absence of [scriptural] evidence" for extending it to the political sphere.

Arabic: أما الولاية على الأمور الحسبية كحفظ أموال الغائب واليتيم إذا لم يكن من يتصدى لحفظها كالولي أو نحوه، فهي ثابتة للفقيه الجامع للشرائط وكذا الموقوفات التي ليس لها متولي من قبل الواقف والمرافعات، فإن فصل الخصومة فيها بيد الفقيه وأمثال ذلك، وأما الزائد على ذلك فالمشهور بين الفقهاء على عدم الثبوت، والله العالم	English: "As for wilayah (guardianship) of omour al-hesbiah (non-litigious affairs) such as the maintenance of properties of the missing and the orphans, if they are not addressed to preservation by a wali (guardian) or so, it is proven for the faqih jame'a li-sharaet and likewise waqf properties that do not have a mutawalli (trustee) on behalf of waqif (donor of waqf) and continuance pleadings, the judgement regarding litigation is in his hand and similar authorities, but with regards to the excess of that (guardianship) the most popular (opinion) among the jurists is on absence of its evidence, Allah knows best."

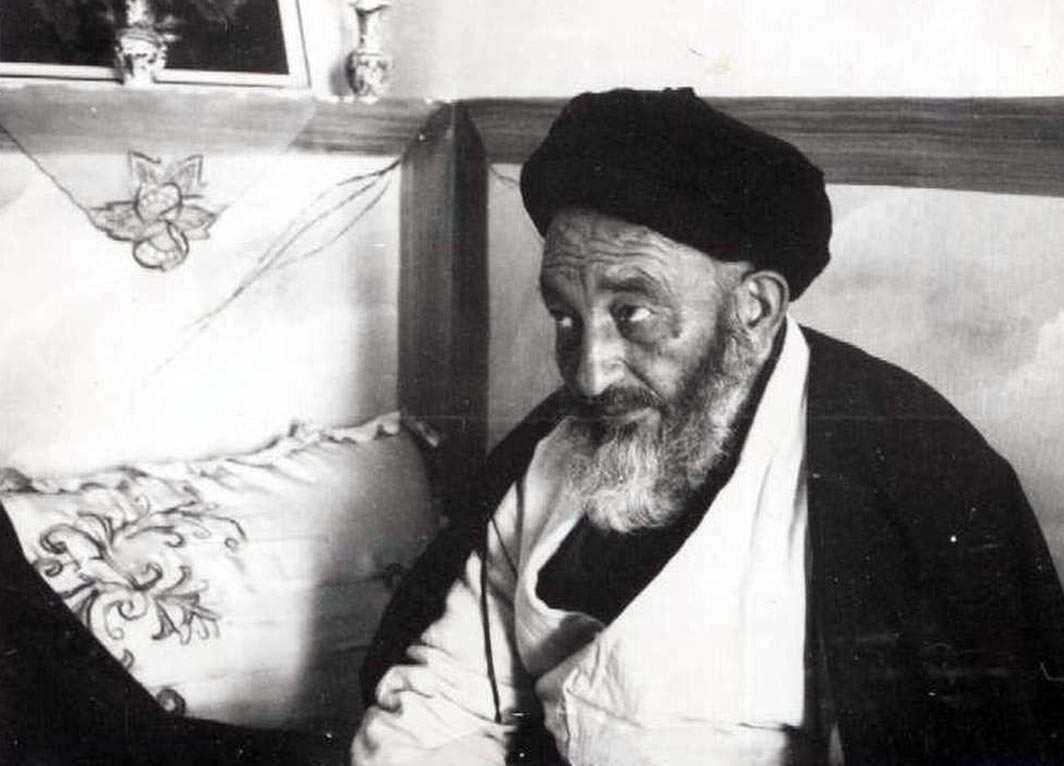
Syed Abulhassan Shamsabadi was killed by Islamists in 1976.

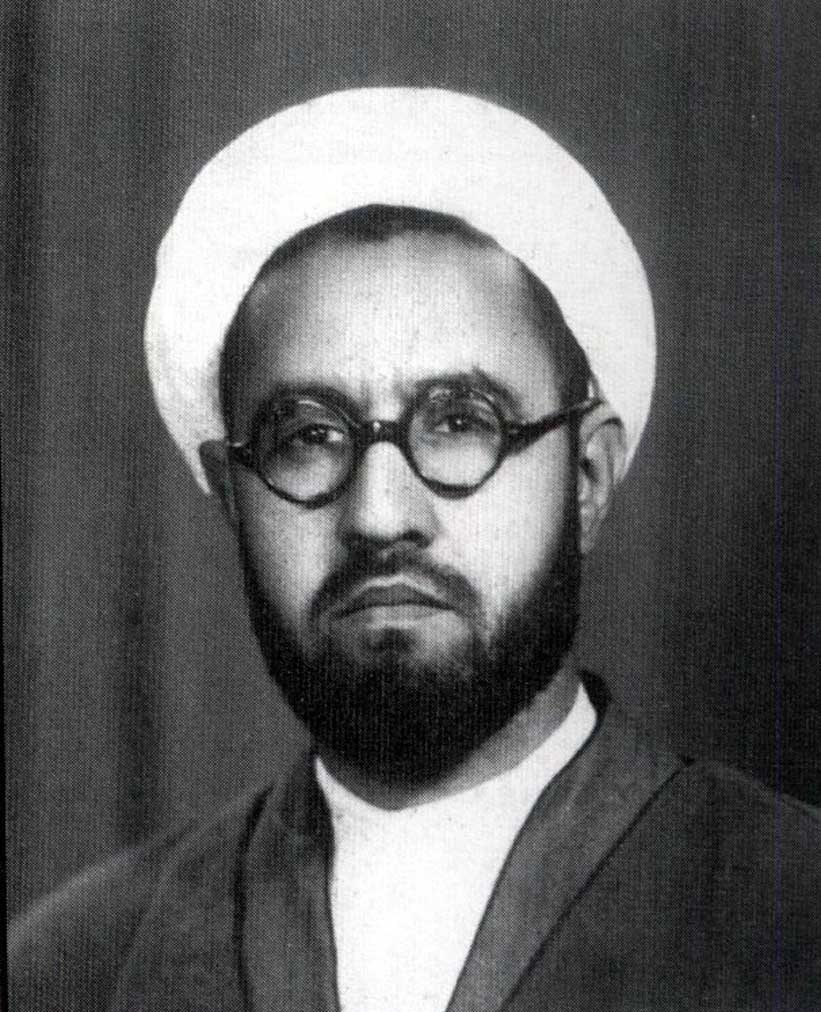
Murtaza Mutahhari (Persian: مرتضی مطهری; 31 January 1919 – 1 May 1979) was a moderate Islamist.

Ayatullah Khoei showed greater flexibility and tolerance than Islamists in accommodating modern values, for example he considered non-Muslims as equal citizens of the nation-state, stopped the harsh punishments like stoning and favored the use of holy books other than Quran for oaths taken from non-Muslims. In Isfahan, Ayatullah Khoei's representative Syed Abul Hasan Shamsabadi gave sermons criticizing the Islamist interpretation of Shi'i theology, he was abducted and killed by the notorious group called Target Killers (Persian: هدفی ها) headed by Mehdi Hashmi. At Qom, the major Marja Mohammad Kazem Shariatmadari was at odds with Khomeini's interpretation of the concept of the "Leadership of Jurists" (Wilayat al-faqih), according to which clerics may assume political leadership if the current government is found to rule against the interests of the public. Contrary to Khomeini, Shariatmadari adhered to the traditional Twelver Shiite view, according to which the clergy ought to serve society and remain aloof from politics. Furthermore, Shariatmadari strongly believed that no system of government can be coerced upon a people, no matter how morally correct it may be. Instead, people need to be able to freely elect a government. He believed a democratic government where the people administer their own affairs is perfectly compatible with the correct interpretation of the Leadership of the Jurists. Before the revolution, Shariatmadari wanted a return to the system of constitutional monarchy that was enacted in the Iranian Constitution of 1906. He encouraged peaceful demonstrations to avoid bloodshed. According to such a system, the Shah's power was limited and the ruling of the country was mostly in the hands of the people through a parliamentary system. Mohammad Reza Pahlavi, the then Shah of Iran, and his allies, however, took the pacifism of clerics such as Shariatmadari as a sign of weakness. The Shah's government declared a ban on Muharram commemorations hoping to stop revolutionary protests. After a series of severe crack downs on the people and the clerics and the killing and arrest of many, Shariatmadari criticized the Shah's government and declared it non-Islamic, tacitly giving support to the revolution hoping that a democracy would be established in Iran.

Meanwhile, in Iraq, since 1972, The Ba'ath regime in Iraq had started arresting and killing members of the Dawa party. Ayatullah Khoei, Baqir al-Sadr and Khomeini condemned the act. Sadr issued a fatwa forbidding students of religious schools and clerics from joining any political party. In 1977, the Iraqi government banned the annual Azadari commemorations in Karbala.

=== 1979 Islamist Revolution ===
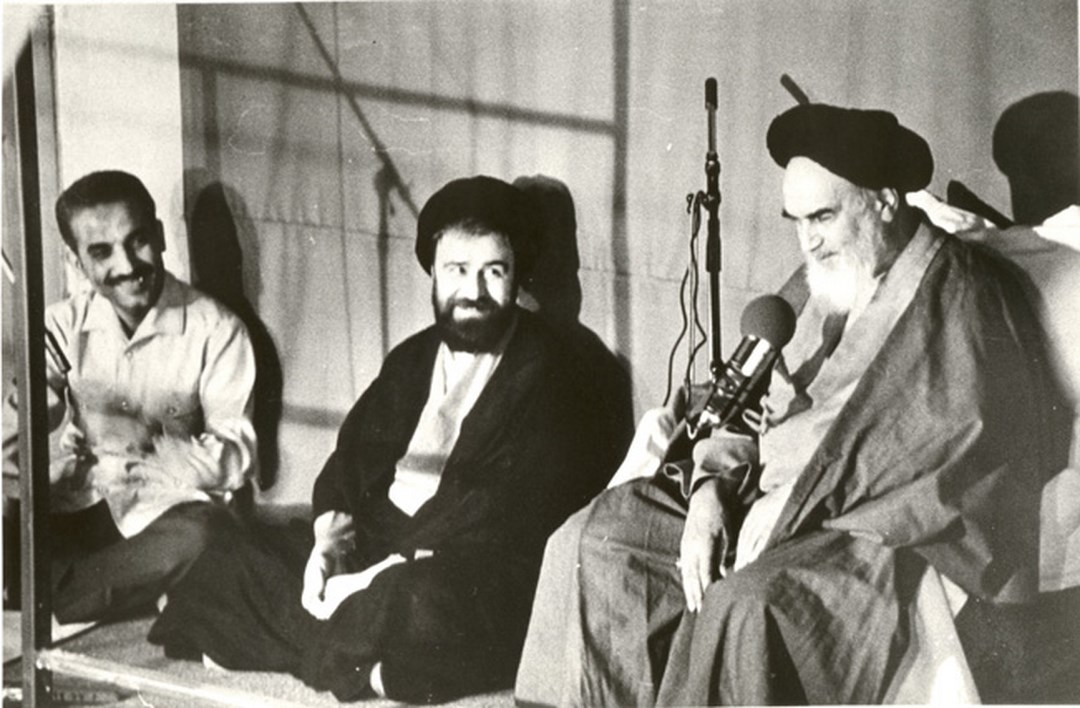
Ruhollah Khomeini in Tehran with Ahmad Khomeini and Mohammad-Ali Rajai

On 6 January 1978, an article appeared in the daily Ettela'at newspaper, insulting Ayatullah Khomeini. This has been called the moment that turned agitation into revolution as "the entire opposition" from secular middle class to urban poor "rose in his defense". Khomeini "unleashed" his partisans, and the bazaars were closed down. Frustrated youth in Qom took to the streets, six were killed. On 40th day of deaths in Qom, Tabriz saw uprising and deaths. Mullahs who had hitherto withheld support from Khomeini and his doctrines "now fell in line", providing the resources of "over 20,000 properties and buildings throughout Iran", where Muslims "gathered to talk and receive orders". The chain-reaction started and led to uprisings in all cities, starting "a spiral of provocation, repression and polarization that rose steadily until the shah was forced to depart". Seizing the moment, Khomeini gave an interview to the French newspaper Le Monde and demanded that the regime should be overthrown. He started giving interviews to western media in which he appeared as a changed man, spoke of a 'progressive Islam' and did not mention the idea of 'political guardianship of the jurist'. At the end of 1978, Shapour Bakhtiar, a known social democrat was chosen to help in the creation of a civilian government to replace the existing military one. He was appointed to the position of prime minister by the Shah, as a concession to his opposition. However his political party, National Front, expelled him. In the words of historian Abbas Milani: "more than once in the tone of a jeremiad he reminded the nation of the dangers of clerical despotism, and of how the fascism of the mullahs would be darker than any military junta". On 10 and 11 December 1978, the days of Tasu'a and Ashura, millions marched on the streets of Tehran, chanting 'Death to Shah', a display that political scientist Gilles Kepel has dubbed the "climax" of "general submission to Islamist cultural hegemony" in Iran.

On 16 January 1979, Shah left the country "on vacation", never to return and to die of cancer a year and a half later. By 11 February 1979, the monarchy was officially brought down and Khomeini assumed leadership over Iran while guerrillas and rebel troops overwhelmed Pahlavi loyalists in armed combat. Following the March 1979 Islamic Republic referendum, in which Iranian voters overwhelmingly approved the country's becoming an Islamic republic; several months later voters approved the new constitution and Khomeini emerged as the Supreme Leader of Iran in December 1979. The post-revolutionary state was characterized by Islamic fundamentalism, which refers to a movement towards returning to the original principles of Islam, interpreting them conservatively, and implementing them in all spheres of life. In Iran, this meant the implementation of Sharia law and the establishment of institutions based on Islamic principles. This shift affected various aspects of life in Iran, including dress codes, social behaviors, and legal matters, aligning them with Islamic tenets.

The Islamic Revolution Committees, or Komiteh, were indeed one of the first institutions established after the 1979 Iranian Revolution. They functioned as a form of religious police, enforcing Islamic laws and social norms within the community. Komiteh, were instrumental in the rigorous enforcement of Islamic regulations within urban centers, ensuring adherence to prescribed dress codes, moral conduct, and social interactions. Concurrently, these committees were pivotal in quelling dissent and subduing counterrevolutionary factions and opposition groups that challenged the authority of Ayatollah Khomeini, thereby consolidating the theocratic governance structure. Following the decline of the Komiteh, the Gasht-e-Ershad, also known as the Morality Police, emerged as the primary institution enforcing Islamic regulations in the context of compulsory Hijab in the country. This organization took over the role of the Komiteh in monitoring public behavior and ensuring compliance with Islamic dress codes and moral standards. The Gasht-e-Ershad has been a significant presence in Iran, particularly in urban areas, where they have been known to patrol public spaces to enforce adherence to Islamic norms. Their activities have been a subject of controversy and have sparked protests and debates within Iran over the years.

In the early days after the revolution it was praised as "a completion" of the 1905–1911 Constitutional Revolution, "a fulfillment" of Mosaddeqh's attempt to establish an Iranian "sense of independence and self-direction", "a vindication" of the insurrection against the "White Revolution".

After the success of the 1979 Islamic Revolution, the major Iranian Usuli Marja Mohammad Kazem Shariatmadari criticized Khomeini's system of government as not being compatible with Islam or representing the will of the Iranian people. He severely criticized the way in which a referendum was conducted to establish Khomeini's rule. In response, Khomeini put him under house arrest and imprisoned his family members. This resulted in mass protests in Tabriz which were quashed toward the end of January 1980, when under the orders of Khomeini tanks and the army moved into the city. Murtaza Mutahhari was a moderate Islamist and believed that a jurist only had a supervisory role and was not supposed to govern. In a 1978 treatise on modern Islamic movements, he warned against the ideas of Qutb brothers and Iqbal. Soon after the 1979 revolution, he was killed by a rival group, Furqan, in Tehran.

Shortly after assuming power, Khomeini began calling for Islamic revolutions across the Muslim world, including Iran's Arab neighbor Iraq, the one large state besides Iran with a Shia majority population. At the same time Saddam Hussein, Iraq's secular Arab nationalist Ba'athist leader, was eager to take advantage of Iran's weakened military and (what he assumed was) revolutionary chaos, and in particular to occupy Iran's adjacent oil-rich province of Khuzestan, and to undermine Iranian Islamic revolutionary attempts to incite the Shi'a majority of his country. While Khomeini was in Paris, Baqir al-Sadr in Iraq had issued a long statement to the Iranians praising their uprising. After the 1979 revolution, he sent his students to Iran to show support and called on Arabs to support the newly born Islamist state. He published a collection of six essays titled al-Islam Yaqud al-Hayat (Islam Governs Life), and declared that joining Ba'ath party was prohibited. Khomeini responding by issuing public statements supporting his cause, that resulted in an uprising in Iraq. Sadr told his followers to call off demonstrations as he sensed the Sunni dominated Ba'ath party's preparations for a crackdown. The crackdown began by his arrest, in response to which the demonstrations spread nation-wide and the government had to release him the next day. The Ba'athists started to arrest and execute the second layer of leadership and killed 258 members of the Dawa party. Dawa party responded by violence and threw a bomb at Tariq Aziz, killing his bodyguards.

Saddam Hussain had become the fifth president of Iraq on 16 July 1979, and after publicly killing 22 members of Ba'ath party during the televised 1979 Ba'ath Party Purge, established firm control over the government. Those spared were given weapons and directed to execute their comrades. On 31 March 1980, the government passed a law sentencing all present and past members of the Dawa party to death. Sadr called on people to uprising. He and his vocal sister were arrested on 5 April 1980 and killed three days later.

In September 1980, Iraq launched a full-scale invasion of Iran, beginning the Iran–Iraq War (September 1980 – August 1988). A combination of fierce resistance by Iranians and military incompetence by Iraqi forces soon stalled the Iraqi advance and, despite Saddam's internationally condemned use of poison gas, Iran had by early 1982 regained almost all of the territory lost to the invasion. The invasion rallied Iranians behind the new regime, enhancing Khomeini's stature and allowing him to consolidate and stabilize his leadership. After this reversal, Khomeini refused an Iraqi offer of a truce, instead demanding reparations and the toppling of Saddam Hussein from power.

Meanwhile, in traditional Usuli seminaries, the Islamists were facing passive resistance. In an attempt to present themselves as sole representatives of Shi'ism, the Islamists launched defamation campaign against the traditional Usuli clergy. In his "Charter of the Clergy" (Persian: منشور روحانیت), Ayatollah Khomeini wrote:

"At the religious seminaries, there are individuals who are engaged in activities against the revolution and the pure Islam (Persian: اسلام ناب محمدی). Today they are simply sanctimonious posers, some are undermining religion, revolution and system as if they have no other obligation. The menace of the foolish reactionaries and sanctimonious clerics at religious seminaries is not insignificant. ... The first and most significant move [by the enemy] is the induction of the slogan of separation of religion from politics."

After the arrest of Ayatollah Shariatmadari and his televised forced confessions, other Usuli sources of emulation like Ayatollah Hasan Qomi, Ayatollah Muhammad Rohani and Ayatollah Sadiq Rohani were among the most prominent clerics to face the wrath of the Islamist regime.

The Ministry of Culture and Islamic Guidance in Iran is responsible for overseeing the nation's cultural policies and media regulation. It ensures that media content adheres to the government's legal standards and religious values, which includes monitoring internet content. The ministry also manages the licensing of cultural goods, including films, music, books, and art, to maintain consistency with national standards. Additionally, it aligns religious observances with legal requirements, contributing to the political dialogue, notably through the Friday Sermon. The ministry also aims to foster an understanding of so-called Iranian-Islamic culture while maintaining cultural sovereignty. Its wide-ranging authority influences Iran's cultural and ideological direction, in accordance with the principles established by the Islamic Revolution. In the context of educations in schools, the Ministry of Education ensures that curricula and teaching practices adhere to Islamic principles. This includes the mandatory teaching of the Quran and Islamic studies, as well as the enforcement of Islamic dress codes for both students and faculty. The language of instruction is Persian, and there are strict policies against the use of non-Persian languages in state schools, which has implications for Iran's ethnolinguistic minorities.

When it comes to universities, the early years after the 1979 revolution were marked by the Cultural Revolution, which began in 1980. This period saw a significant overhaul of higher education, aimed at purging Western and non-Islamic influences from university campuses. Universities were closed for three years, and upon reopening, many books were banned, and thousands of students and lecturers were expelled or barred from returning. The goal was to "Islamize" the universities and ensure that they were in line with the revolutionary ideals. Since then, the state has maintained control over universities, with the Ministry of Science, Research, and Technology and the Ministry of Health and Medical Education overseeing higher education. These ministries regulate university curricula, faculty appointments, and student admissions, ensuring alignment with Islamic values. Additionally, various councils and committees, such as the Supreme Council of the Cultural Revolution, continue to play a role in shaping educational policies and monitoring their implementation to maintain the Islamic character of these institutions.

== Viewpoints ==
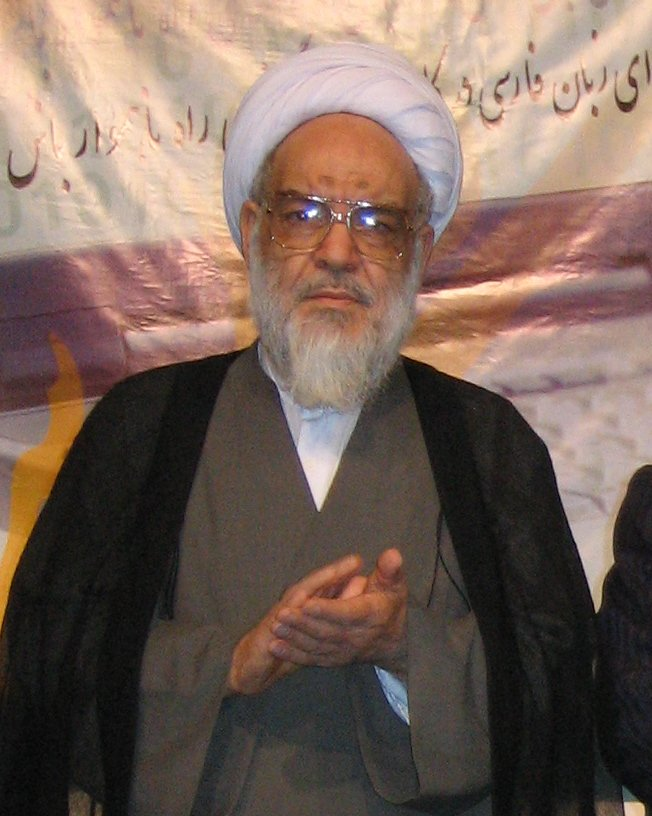
In 2006, a cleric with no university education was appointed as the head of Tehran University, Iran's symbol of modern scientific and secular institutions

Iranian fundamentalism must be seen as one of the Abrahamic revivalisms of the twentieth century. As in the course of the Persian Constitutional Revolution nearly a century earlier, the concept of justice was at the center of the debates among the followers of the three Islamic orientations. The principlists adhered to the traditional notion of Islamic justice that states "equals should be treated alike, but unequal proportionately to their relevant differences, and all with impartiality". Neo-principlists gave a messianic interpretation to the concept, one that promised equal distribution of societal resources to all—including the "unequals." And finally, those with a liberal orientation related the notion of justice to the French revolutionary slogan of egalité, i.e., the equality of all before the law.

While the principlists were generally suspicious of modern ideas and resistant to modern lifestyles at the time of the revolution, the neo-principlists were receptive to many aspects of modernity and willing to collaborate with secular intellectuals and political activists.

Many of the neo-principlists, like Christian fundamentalists, extract a verse from the scriptures and give it a meaning contrary to traditional commentary. While denouncing modernism as the "Great Satan", many principlists accept its foundations, especially relating to science and technology. For traditionalists, nature expresses beauty that must be preserved in every aspect of life, from chanting the Qur'an to an artisan's fashioning an everyday pot. Many principlists even seek a Qur'anic basis for modern man's dominion over and destruction of nature by referring to the injunction to 'dominate the earth'–misconstruing the idea of viceregency: that man is expected to be the perfect servant of God. An example of an environmental problem is overpopulation. The neo-principlists ' family policy is to increase the population dramatically. Ahmadinejad's call for increasing Iran's population from 70 to 120 million can be understood in that context.

In Mehdi Mozaffan's chapter on comparative study of Islamism in Algeria and Iran, he says,

"I define Islamic fundamentalism or Islamism as a militant and anti-modernist movement ... not every militant Muslim is a fundamentalist. but an Islamic fundamentalist is necessarily a militant."

A major difference between Shia fundamentalism in Iran and mainstream Islamic fundamentalism is that the former has nothing to do with Salafism. According to Gary Legenhausen: "The term Islamic Fundamentalism is one that has been invented by Western journalists by analogy with Christian Fundamentalism. It is not a very apt term, but it has gained currency. In the Sunni world, it is used for groups descended from the Salafiyyah movement, such as the Muslim Brotherhood." The concept of "Salaf" (السلف) does not exist in Shia theology, in contrast to Sunni Islam as well as Christianity (referred to as "original Christianity").

Political Islam consists of an array of movements in the Muslim world that hold that political power is an essential instrument for constructing a God-fearing society. They believe that Muslims can fulfill their religious obligations only when public law sanctions and encourages pious behavior. To this end, the majority of these movements work to take control of state power, whether by propaganda, plebiscite, or putsch.

Various clerics express significant differences in viewpoints and practical approaches. When Khomeini urged his mentor Ayatullah Husain Borujerdi to oppose the Shah more openly. Broujerdi rejected that idea. He believed in the separation of religion from politics, and was Khomeini's senior in rank. Just before his death (1961) Boroujerdi expressed his opposition to the Shah's plans for land reform and women's enfranchisement. He issued a fatwa for killing Ahmad Kasravi. Khomeini remained silent while his seniors Ayatollah Haeri and Ayatolla Boroujerdi were alive. Thereafter he was promoted to a Grand Marja, started his activism, and worked to establish the Islamic Republic. Among Khomeini's students were notable clerics whose ideas were not compatible with their mentor, for example Morteza Motahhari, Mohammad Beheshti, and Mohammad Taghi Mesbah-Yazdi. Criticizing Mesbah-Yazdi and Haghani school, Beheshti said: "Controversial and provocative positions that are coupled with violence, in my opinion...will have the reverse effect. Such positions remind many individuals of the wielding of threats of ex-communication that you have read about in history concerning the age of the Inquisition, the ideas of the Church, and the Middle Ages". Motahhari, Khomeini's most notable student, was known as one of the revolution's main theoreticians (next to Ali Shariati). While Mesbah-Yazdi was an advocate of expelling secular University lecturers, Motahhari insisted that the philosophies of marxism and liberalism must be taught by a Marxist and a liberal, respectively. Both Motahhari and Beheshti were assassinated by terrorist groups shortly after the revolution. Motahhari introduced the concept of the "dynamism of Islam".

After the revolution and the subsequent liquidation of the and secular-leftist groups, two principal ideological camps became dominant in Iranian politics: the fundamentalists and the radicals. The radicals followed the Khomeini of the revolution rather than his incumbency or his theocratic vision of Islamic Government: (government of the jurist). Mesbah-Yazdi rejected Khomeini's Islamic Republic and supported the idea of an Islamic government in which the people have no vote.

Contrary to Iranian traditionalists, neo-fundamentalists as well as Iranian liberals came under the influence of Western thinkers. Islamic neo-fundamentalists borrowed from Western countercurrents of populism, fascism, anarchism, Jacobinism, and Marxism without the welfare state. During the 1990s, Akbar Ganji discovered links that connected the chain murders of Iran to the reigning neoconservative clergymen (Ali Fallahian, Gholam Hossein Mohseni-Ejehei, and Mesbah-Yazdi) who had issued the fatwas legitimizing assassinations of secular humanists and religious modernists. In May 1996, Ganji presented a lecture at Shiraz University entitled "Satan Was the First Fascist." He was charged with defaming the Islamic Republic and tried in a closed court. His defense was later published under the title of "Fascism is one of the Mortal Sins". (Kian, Number 40, February 1997.)

Another important issue is the concept of "insider-outsider" introduced by Khamenei, later the supreme leader. In his administration outsiders have fewer rights compared to insiders and cannot assume administrative posts. He stated that "I mean, you [to his followers] must trust an insider as a member of your clique. We must consider as insiders those persons who are sympathetic toward our revolution, our state, and Islam. The outsiders are the ones who are opposed to the principle of our state."

In another speech Khamenei compared what he called "American fundamentalism" and "Islamic fundamentalism":

"We can see that in the world today there are nations with constitutions going back 200 to 300 years. The governments of these nations, which occasionally protest against the Islamic Republic, firmly safeguard their own constitutions. They clutch firmly to safeguard centuries-old constitutions to protect them frocem harm. [...] However, when it comes to us and as we show commitment to our constitution and values, they accuse us of fundamentalism or describe us as reactionaries. In other words, the American fundameentalism is viewed as a positive virtue, whereas Islamic fundamentalism–based on logic, wisdom, experience and desire for independence–is condemned as some sort of debasement. Of course, they no longer use that term fundamentalism to describe us, instead they refer to us as conservatives."

He distinguished what he called "extremism" and "fundamentalism": "There may be a handful of extremists here and there, but all the elements serving in various departments of our country are fundamentalists in essence."

Iranian neoconservatives reject democracy, the Universal Declaration of Human Rights (UDHR)and disparage those who disagree. In particular Mesbah-Yazdi is an aggressive defender of the supreme leader's absolute power, and holds that democracy and elections are not compatible with Islam. He once stated:

"Democracy means if the people want something that is against God's will, then they should forget about God and religion ... Be careful not to be deceived. Accepting Islam is not compatible with democracy."

In contrast to neo-principlists, principlists accept the ideas of democracy and UDHR. During his lifetime, Khomeini expressed support for UDHR; in Sahifeh Nour (Vol.2 Page 242), he states: "We would like to act according to the Universal Declaration of Human Rights. We would like to be free. We would like independence." However, Iran adopted an "alternative" human rights declaration, the Cairo Declaration on Human Rights in Islam, in 1990 (one year after Khomeini's death).

On the issue of Islamic criminal punishment such as stoning, Ayatollah Gholamreza Rezvani states that the Q'uran sanctions stoning unequivocally and that since it is the word of God, it must be followed. In 2007, the Shahrudi directive, Mohammad Javad Larijani called stoning "a feature of Shari'a law," "original and respectable punishment" and claimed that "Mr. Shahrudi is not opposed to the principle of a...verdict that is based on Islamic Sharia." He also said:

"We will never surrender Islam in the face of human rights concerns ... During the adoption of these (human rights) laws, the world of Islam was in complete ignorance while liberals and secular parties formulated and imposed these laws onto the entire world ... We must elucidate punishment by stoning clearly to those who denounce it. We had a revolution so that Islamic laws would be implemented ... We will never give up Islam in the face of these challenges".

Larijani's remarks came while an investigation by the judiciary authorities was taking place as to whether the stoning ordered by a local judge and which Larijani was defending—violated a 2002 directive by judiciary head Ayatollah Mahmud Hashemi-Shahrudi against carrying out the practice.

During Mohammad Khatami's presidency, Mesbah-Yazdi claimed that an unnamed former CIA chief had visited Iran with a suitcase stuffed with dollars to pay opinion-formers. He stated, "What is dangerous is that agents of the enemy, the CIA, have infiltrated the government and the cultural services." On top of its official budget for Iran, the CIA had given "hundreds of millions of dollars to our cultural officials and journalists," he added, continuing "He made contact with various newspaper chiefs and gave them dollars." Nasser Pourpirar claimed that a significant portion of recorded Iranian history was baseless fabrications by Jewish orientalists and Zionists. "The whole existence of Pre-Islamic Iran is no more than a Jewish conspiracy and the most important key for analyzing today's world events is the analysis of the ancient "Jewish genocide of Purim." Another neoconservative theorist, Mohammad Ali Ramin, believes that contemporary western history (e.g. Holocaust) is all Jewish fabrications. He even claimed that Adolf Hitler was a Jew. M.A. Ramin, Hassan Abbasi, Abbas Salimi Namin and others gave speeches about Jewish conspiracy theory, Iranian and western history following the establishment of Ahmadinejad's government in 2005. Abadgaran described itself as a group of Islamic neo-principlists, that has control over the Iranian government. However, it lost the 2006 city council election.

Abdolkarim Soroush stated that if a people's religious identity becomes more salient than its national identity, fundamentalism rises. In other words, fundamentalism can be seen as "identity-ism." Many of the religious remarks that are made in Iran, especially from official platforms, rest the inculcation of religious identity.

Some among Iran's leadership would accept accommodation with the West in exchange for economic and strategic concessions, while others accept isolation. Others favor a "Chinese model," which in Iran would open its economy to international investment while maintaining clerical dominance.

== Circles, schools and organizations ==
=== Fadayan-e Islam ===
Fadayan-e Islam was founded in 1946 as an Islamic fundamentalist organization. Navab Safavi, a neo-fundamentalist cleric, founded the group. The group's aim was to transform Iran into an Islamic state. The group committed numerous terrorist acts. Notable among these was the 1946 assassination of Ahmad Kasravi, an intellectual who had criticized the Shia Islamic clergy. The group also assassinated two prime ministers (Ali Razmara and Hassan Ali Mansour, 1951 and 1965) and a former prime minister, Abdolhossein Hazhir, in 1949.

=== Haghani school ===
Haghani Circle is a neo-fundamentalist school of thought in Iran founded by a group of clerics based in the holy city of Qom and headed by Ayatollah Mohammad Taghi Mesbah-Yazdi, an influential cleric and theologian.

The school trains clerics with both a traditional and modern curriculum, including secular science, medicine, politics, and Western/non-Islamic philosophy (topics not taught in traditional schools). It was founded by Mesbah-Yazdi, Ayatollah Ahmad Jannati, Beheshti and Ayatollah Sadoughi.

Many famous theologians and influential figures in Iran's politics after the revolution were associated (as teacher or student) with the Circle or follow its ideology.

=== Combatant Clergy Association ===
The association is composed of conservative elements of Iran's political culture, including the nation's foremost politicized clerics, the Friday prayer leaders in most of Iran's metropolitan areas, the bazaar merchants, and the Supreme Leader. Not surprisingly, members of this faction support the status quo, including strict limits on personal freedoms and the continued primacy of the clergy in the nation's governance. Important constituents of the Militant Clergy Society include the Islamic Coalition Society and the Coalition of Followers of the Line of the Imam.

The Combatant Clergy Association was the majority party in the 4th and 5th parliaments after the Iranian revolution. It was founded in 1977 by a group of clerics who intended to use a cultural approach to overthrow the Shah. Its founding members were Khamenei, Motahhari, Beheshti, Bahonar, Rafsanjani and Mohammad Mofatteh and its current members include Rafsanjani, Ahmad Jannati, Mahdavi Kani, Reza Akrami and Hassan Rohani.

As the foremost advocates of the status quo, the Association is not popular among rank-and-file Iranians.

=== Ansar e Hezbollah ===
Ansar-e-Hezbollah is a militant neo-fundamentalist group. Mojtaba Bigdeli is a spokesman for the Iranian Hezbollah. Human Rights Watch (HRW) condemned the assault on students at Tehran University halls of residence in the early hours of Friday 9 July 1999 by group members.

=== Basij ===
Basij is a military fundamentalist network. In July 1999, Ezzat Ebrahim-Nejad was shot dead in a Tehran University dormitory by a member of Basij's military force. The event initiated a demonstration. In 2001, a member of the Basij, Saeed Asgar attempted to assassinate Saeed Hajjarian, a political advisor to Khatami. Asagar was arrested and sentenced to 15 years in prison, but was released after a short interval. HRW stated that the Basij belong to the "Parallel institutions" (nahad-e movazi), "the quasi-official organs of repression that have become increasingly open in crushing student protests, detaining activists, writers, and journalists in secret prisons, and threatening pro-democracy speakers and audiences at public events." Under the control of the Office of the Supreme Leader these groups operate arbitrary checkpoints around Tehran, while uniformed police refrain from confronting them. "Illegal prisons, which are outside of the oversight of the National Prisons Office, are sites where political prisoners are abused, intimidated, and tortured with impunity." On 8 March 2004 the Basij initiated a violent crackdown on activists celebrating International Women's Day in Tehran. On 13 November 2006 Tohid Ghaffarzadeh, a student at Islamic Azad University of Sabzevar, was murdered by a Basij member at the university. The murderer reportedly said that what he did was according to his religious beliefs. Tohid Ghaffarzadeh was talking to his girlfriend when he was approached and knifed by the Basij member.

== Theories of state based on divine legitimacy ==
Various theories of state based on divine legitimacy were proposed by Iranian clerics. Four types of theocracies can be distinguished. In chronological order:

- "Appointed Mandate of Jurisconsult" in Religious Matters (Shar'iat) Along with the Monarchic Mandate of Muslim Potentates in Secular Matters (Saltanat E Mashrou'eh). Proponents: Mohammad Bagher Majlesi (Allameh Majlesi), Mirza ye Ghomi, Seyed e Kashfi, Sheikh Fadl ollah Nouri, Ayatollah Abdolkarim Haeri Mesbah-Yazdi.
- "General Appointed Mandate of Jurisconsults" (Velayat E Entesabi Ye Ammeh) Proponents: Molla Ahmad Naraghi, Sheikh Mohammad Hassan Najafi (Saheb Javaher) Ayatollahs Husain Borujerdi, Golpayegani, Khomeini, (before the revolution)
- "General Appointed Mandate of the Council of the Sources of Imitation" (Velayat E Entesabi Ye Ammeh Ye Shora Ye Marje'eh Taghlid) Proponents: Ayatollahs: Abdollah Javadi-Amoli, Beheshti, Taheri Khorram Abadi
- "Absolute Appointed Mandate of Jurisconsult" (Velayat e Entesabi ye Motlaghe ye Faghihan) Proponent: Khomeini (after revolution)

=== Islamic republic versus Islamic administration ===
Since Khatami's election in 1997, two outlooks toward the achievement of reform in Iran have predominated: "Reformists" within the regime (in-system reformers) claim that the Constitution has the capacity to lead the "Revolutionary" government of Iran toward "democracy." By contrast, secularists, who remain outside the regime, claim that the Constitution contains impediments sufficient to block meaningful reform.

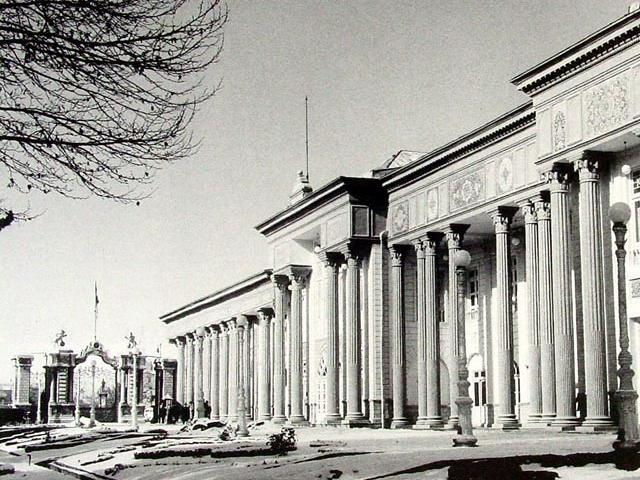
The Iranian parliament building as it appeared in the winter of 1956.

Fundamentalists and in-system reformers on one side and neo-fundamentalists on the other side struggle over "Khomeini's Islamic Republic" versus "Mesbah's Islamic administration." Mesbah-Yazdi and Ansar-e-Hezbollah call for a change in the Iranian constitution from a republic to an Islamic administration. They believe the institutions of the Islamic Republic, such as the Majlis (Iran's Parliament), are contradictory to Islamic government which is centered around Velayat-e Faqih and total obedience.

Khamenei has remained silent on the issue. However, he clearly rejected the supervision of Assembly of Experts over the institutions under his responsibility (e.g. Military forces, Judiciary system and IRIB).

Neo-fundamentalists believe that the supreme leader is holy and infallible and the role of people and elections are merely to discover the leader, whose legitimacy comes from God and not the people. In January 2007, Rafsanjani, who won the 2006 election for Assembly of Experts, rejected this idea and emphasized the fact that the leader and the cleric members of the Assembly of Experts may make wrong decisions and the legitimacy of the leader comes from the people not the God.

Beyond these theoretical debates, advocates of the Islamic Administration are slowly replacing those of the Islamic Republic.

== Exporting Islamic Revolution and Islamist diplomacy ==
After the Revolution, the conservative and radical factions differed on foreign policy and cultural issues. The radicals adamantly opposed any rapprochement with the United States and, to a lesser extent, other Western countries, while seeking to expand Iran's relations with the socialist bloc. They advocated active support for Islamic and liberation movements, pushing to "export the revolution" throughout the world. The conservatives favored a more cautious approach, with the aim of normalizing Iran's economic relations with the rest of the world, so long as the West's political and cultural influence on the country could be curbed.

According to Iranian scholar Ehsan Naraghi, anti-Western attitudes among Iranian Islamists had its root in Marxism and Communism rather than Iranian Islam. Iran and the West had good relations with mutual respect after the Safavid era. However, with the emergence of Communism in Iran, anti-Western attitudes proliferated.

After the 1988 end of the Iran–Iraq War and Khomeini's death, pragmatists under Rafsanjani's leadership sought to normalize relations with other countries, particularly those in the region, by playing down the export idea. After Ahmadinejad's victory in the 2005 elections and the defeat of pragmatists/reformists (under Khatami), the Neoconservatives who gained control of both parliament and government resurrected the export idea.

Following the Revolution, the government (with the patronage of Vladimir Putin's Russian Federation), pursued an Islamic foreign policy that included creation of Hezbollah, subsidies to Hamas, opposition to Israel and Zionist leaders, and aid to Iraq's Shiite political parties. Hamas leaders verified in 2008 that since Israel pulled out of the Gaza Strip in 2005 they had sent their fighters to Iran to train in field tactics and weapons technology. In an interview in 2007, Hezbollah Deputy Secretary-General Naim Qassem told the Iranian Arabic-language TV station al-Qawthar that all military actions in Lebanon must be approved by the Tehran authorities; in 2008 Iran issued a stamp commemorating a recently killed Hezbollah leader.

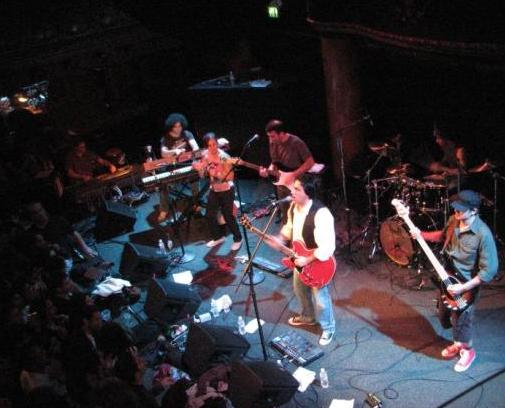
In the song called "eshgh e sor'at" (crazy for speed), Kiosk underground music band make open political references and criticize Iran's foreign policy: "Nothing for lunch or dinner to make, But let them eat Yellowcake, Scraped up the very last dime, Sent it straight to Palestine".

Fundamentalism and political realism are diplomatically incompatible. Iran's diplomacy lost numerous opportunities provided by international or regional political developments over the country's focus on fundamental values over national interests. The model of realistic fundamentalism did not work in the diplomatic arena.

Muslim thinkers often express "religious internationalism". Religious modernists in Iran have still some inclinations towards religious internationalism, while the concept of nation-state is not accepted. Such beliefs are mainly rooted in traditional thinking rather than postmodernism. Religious intellectuals such as Ahmad Zeidabadi are against religious internationalism.

Western countries have adopted various strategies with respect to fundamentalists. Their attitudes seem mainly driven by geopolitics and the oil market rather than religious extremism per se. According to Graham Fuller of the RAND Corporation and a former vice-chairman of the National Intelligence Council at CIA, the "United States had no problem with Islam or even Islamic fundamentalism as such. [...] one of the closest American allies in the Middle East, Saudi Arabia, is a fundamentalist state."

Mehdi Noorbaksh, of the Center for International Studies, University of St. Thomas, stated that the perceived threat of Islamic fundamentalism to world peace and security is based on a politically and ideologically motivated misinterpretation of the reformist nature of Islamic revival. He claimed that the portrayal of Iran as a terrorist state strengthened the extremists and weakened democratic reformists groups in Iran. Noorbaksh: "The spread of democracy and the introduction of socio-political reforms in the Middle East, especially in Iran, will undermine US domination over the region."

== Seminary-university conflicts ==
One of the main calls raised during the Iranian Cultural Revolution was the call for seminary-university unity. The original idea was a reconciliation between science and religion. Seminary-university unity was an attempted resolution of the historical conflict between science and religion. After the revolution, as clerics came to rule over the country, the idea of seminary-university unity, gradually turned into submission to clerics and seminary teachers. It lost its logical/scholarly meaning and took on a political and practical dimension. The appointment of Abbasali Amid Zanjani as the only clerical president of University of Tehran on 27 December 2005 can be understood in that context. Tehran University is the symbol of higher education in Iran. Abbasali Amid Zanjani holds no academic degree and was appointed by Mohammad Mehdi Zahedi, the minister of Science, Research, and Technology in Ahmadinejad's cabinet.

University of Revolution, a journal in the 1980s, used to include material by neofundamentalists. They attempted to prove that science is without a homeland, that it is not the case that it recognises no geography, and that it is therefore possible to create "Islamic science".

In 2007 Mesbah-Yazdi called university people the most indecent people. In April 2008, Abdollah Javadi Amoli, Ebrahim Amini, Mesbah-Yazdi and Mohammed Emami-Kashani criticized Iranian Universities, university students and Iranian Higher education system as secular, non-Islamic, indecent and cheap.

== Islamist art and literature ==
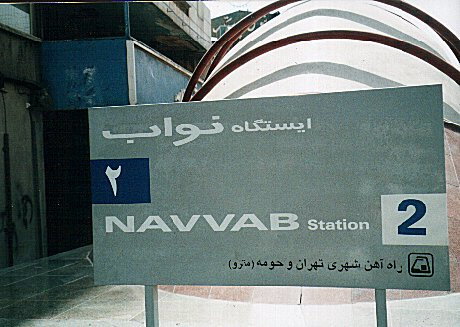
Navvab Safavi metro station in Tehran

Both Iranian principle-ism and neo principle-ism are accompanied by art, cinema and literature.

Neo-principlist and Iranian journalist, Masoud Dehnamaki was the managing director and chief editor of the weeklies Shalamcheh and Jebheh. These journals were among the main neo-principlist publications. Dehnamaki was one of the strongest opponents of President Khatami and his policies. Shalamcheh was closed down by the press supervisory board of the Ministry of Culture and Islamic Guidance, presumably for insulting or criticizing the late Grand Ayatollah Kho'i, who had called the "velayat-e faqih" position unislamic, prior to his death. He turned to documentary films. Poverty and Prostitution was released in 2002. His next documentary was Which Blue, Which Red, a film about the rivalry between Teheran's two football teams, Esteqlal and Persepolis.

Perhaps the most influential neo-conservative newspaper during the 1990s and 2000s was Kayhan daily. Hossein Shariatmadari and Hossein Saffar Harandi (who later became Minister of Culture) were the editor and responsible chief of the newspaper. In 2006, British ambassador to Tehran met Hossein Shariatmadari acknowledged the role of Kayhan in the region.

To promote art and literature, Islamic Development Organization was founded by Ayatollah Khomeini. In 1991, Ali Khamenei revised the organization's structure and plans to promote religious and moral ideas through art and literature. According to the Minister of Culture, Hossein Saffar Harandi, the funds for Qur'anic activities would increase fourfold by 2007. "All of the ninth governments' cultural and artistic activities should conform to the Holy Book," he declared.

While promoting conforming art and literature, principlists rejected the development of art and literature that has no "valuable content." In 1996, following a fatwa by Ali Khamenei stating that music education corrupts the minds of young children, many music schools were closed and music instruction to children under the age of 16 was banned by public establishments (although private instruction continued). In 2010, Khamenei said that while music is permissible, it is not compatible with the values of the Islamic Republic, and promoted science and sport as alternatives. Khamenei and his followers claimed that "Nihilism and Beatle-ism" have ravaged Western youth. According to the novelist and the first president of Iranian Association of Writers after the revolution, Simin Daneshvar, the Islamic Republic has been generally hostile toward Iranian writers and intellectuals in contrast to the Pahlavi regime.

In 2007, Javad Shamghadri, artistic advisor to President Ahmadinejad, publicly stated that: "Like many other countries in the world, Iran too can get along without a film industry." He added, "Only 20 percent of people go to the cinema, and their needs can be provided through the national radio and television network."

== Islamic-neoclassical economy ==
Shortly after the revolution Khomeini declared that Islam and not the economy was important. In one of his comments, he dismissed the concerns of his first prime minister, Mehdi Bazargan, about the economy stating, "Economics is for donkeys!" However, on many occasions he advised his followers about justice and giving priority to the rights of the deprived and oppressed.

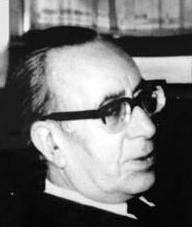
D. Ashuri and A. Soroush believe that Ahmad Fardid originally theorized neo- fundamentalism in Iran. Mesbah-Yazdi rejects the claim.

Association of the Lecturers of Qom's Seminaries (ALQRS or Jame'eh-ye Modarresin-e Howzeh-ye 'Elmiyeh-ye Qom), published their description of an Islamic economy in 1984. It was based on traditional Islamic jurisprudence, which ALQRS reported to be compatible with markets and neoclassical economics. They emphasized economic growth over social equity and declared the quest for profit as legitimate under Islam. According to ALQRS, attaining "maximum welfare" in a neoclassical sense is the aim of an Islamic economic system. However, the system must establish the limits of individual rights. In accordance with this ideological-methodological manifesto of the ALQRS, in February 1984, the council for cultural revolution proposed a national curriculum for economics for all Iranian Universities.

The concept of "Islamic economics" disappeared soon after the revolutionary heat dissipated (the end of the 1980s and after Khomeini's death). It disappeared from Iranian political discourse for fifteen years. In the June 2005 presidential elections, neither Ahmadinejad, nor any of his reformist or conservative opponents mentioned Islamic economy. However, after the establishment of Ahmadinejad's government, his neoconservative team took up the subject. For instance, vice-president Parviz Davoudi said in 2006:

"On the economic field, we are dutybound to implement an Islamic economy and not a capitalistic economy. [...] It is a false image to think that we will make equations and attitudes based on those in a capitalistic system".

Factional conflict dominated Iranian economic politics under Khomeini. The two principal factions were a statist-reformist group that favored state control of the economy and a conservative group that favored the private sector. Both factions claimed Khomeini's support, but by 1987, he had sided with the statist-reformists because he believed state capitalism to be the best way of heading off threats to Islam. Khomeini's death left the factions without their source of legitimacy.

== Principlists and women issues ==
Principlists, irrespective of their gender, promote a strictly limited lifestyle for women. The women in the seventh Iranian parliament were against the proposal to join the Convention on the Elimination of All forms of Discrimination Against Women (CEDAW), for which the female reformists in the sixth parliament had fought. In July 2007, Khamenei criticized Iranian women's rights activists and CEDAW: "In our country ... some activist women, and some men, have been trying to play with Islamic rules in order to match international conventions related to women," Khamenei said. "This is wrong." However he was positive on interpreting Islamic law in a way that it is more favorable for women–but not by adopting Western conventions. Khamenei made these comments two days after women's right activist Delaram Ali was sentenced to 34 months of jail and 10 lashes. The Iranian judiciary operates under the control of the Supreme Leader and is independent from the government.

Principlists pushed traditional garb soon after the revolution of 1979, which had been outlawed by Pahlavi. Since then the police attack women who do not adhere to the tradition. Fighting such women is considered "fighting morally corrupt people" by principlists. In 2007 a national crackdown was launched by the police in which thousands of women were warned and hundreds were arrested. Violators can be whipped, fined and imprisoned. Sae'ed Mortazavi, Tehran's public prosecutor, made this clear when he told the Etemad newspaper: "These women who appear in public like decadent models endanger the security and dignity of young men". Mohammad Taqi Rahbar, a fundamentalist MP, agreed, saying, "Men see models in the streets and ignore their own wives at home. This weakens the pillars of family."

In October 2002, Ali Khamenei called on Iranian women to avoid feminism and sexism in their rights campaigns. "In the process of raising women's issues and solving their problems, feminist inclinations and sexism should be avoided," he told a group of female parliamentarians.

Like many other Grand Ayatollahs, Khamenei believes that women should be wives and mothers. He publicly stated, "The real value of a woman is measured by how much she makes the family environment for her husband and children like a paradise." In July 1997 Khamenei said that the idea of women's equal participation in society was "negative, primitive and childish".

Fundamentalist scholars justify the different religious laws for men and women by referring to their biological and sociological differences. For example, regarding the inheritance law which states that women's share of inheritance is half that of men, Ayatollah Makarim Shirazi quotes Imam Ali ibn Musa Al-reza who reasoned that at the time of marriage man has to pay something to woman and woman receives something, and that men are responsible for both their wives' and their own expenses but women have no such responsibility. Women, however, make up 27% of the Iranian labor force, and the percentage of all Iranian women who are economically active more than doubled from 6.1% in 1986 to 13.7% in 2000.

Life expectancy went up by eleven years between 1980 and 2000 for both men and women. With respect to family planning, "levels of childbearing have declined faster than in any other country," going from 5.6 births per woman in 1985 to 2.0 in 2000, a drop accomplished by a voluntary, but government-sponsored, birth control program. The fact that these changes occurred within an Islamic legal regime suggests that formal legal status may not be a key factor determining women's well-being.

Women are only allowed to sing in chorus, and are not allowed to attend sport stadiums. In 2006 Ahmadinejad surprisingly ordered the vice president to allocate half of the Azadi Soccer Stadium to women. Six Grand Ayatollahs and several MPs protested the move, and finally Khamenei ordered the president to follow the clergy.

== Tolerance and civil rights ==
Tolerance and civil rights are subjects of debates in Iran. Cleric and member of the conservative Islamic Coalition Party, Hojjatoleslam Khorsand, was cited by Etemad Daily as saying that "in cultural issues, a policy of tolerance and laxity is not acceptable." Mesbah-Yazdi, a member of the Assembly of Experts, said about Islam's enemies: "They presented principles such as tolerance and compromise as absolute values while violence was introduced as a non-value." Mesbah-Yazdi stated that "the taboo–that every act of violence is bad and every act of tolerance is good–must be broken." Opponents of violence–"even some of the elite"–have been "deceived and entrapped" by "foreign propaganda," he said. Mesbah-Yazdi believes that "The enemies of Islam must also feel the harshness and violence of Islam." He also stated that "The culture of tolerance and indulgence means the disarming of society of its defense mechanism."

Dividing Iranians into Insider and Outsider was first introduced by Khamenei. Kayhan, which is governed by Khamenei, editorialized on 5 August 1999 that an Insider is "someone whose heart beats for Islam, the revolution and the Imam," while Outsiders are those who have "separated their path from the line of the Imam, the system, and the people who, by relying on citizens' rights, want to introduce themselves as equal partners."

Irreligious people in Iran have less rights then religious people. For example, the president of Iran by constitution must be religious. While Jews, Christians and other minorities have the right to take part in university entrance exams and can become members of parliament or city councils, irreligious people are not granted even their rights.

On one occasion, Persian daily Neshat published an article that called for abolishing the death penalty, claiming that capital punishment is no cure for maladies afflicting modern society. In reaction to this article, conservative Tehran Times Daily stressed that writers of such articles must remember that Iran will not only never tolerate such follies but that the apostates will be given no opportunity to subvert the religion. Neshat's article drew criticism from the theologians and clerics, particularly Khamenei, who warned that apostate journalists are subject to the death penalty, noting the article, adding that the judiciary warned against any acts or words that undermine the Islamic revolution.

In 2002, Ansar e Hezbollah, a group best known for disrupting reformist gatherings and beating up students, declared a "holy war" to rid Iran of reformers who promote Western democracy and challenge the Supreme Leader. Masoud Dehnamaki, an ideologue with the group, also said that Iranians who try to appease Iran's enemies such as the United States "should be stopped".

During Khatami's presidency, minister Ataollah Mohajerani launched a tolerance policy ("Tasahol va Tasamoh"). This policy was criticized harshly by conservatives and ended in the minister's resignation.

While conservatives such as Emad Afrough support the idea of civil society, others such as Mesbah-Yazdi are opposed to the idea of civil rights. Afrough stated, "If we do not actively seek cultural change, our national and ethnic cultures get destroyed. We must consciously choose to answer the questions confronting us. Today's question is civil society ... I believe we can easily reconstruct civil society here (in Iran) based on our own values and cultural characteristics. Civil society is a necessity, and the growing complexity of society requires it. Our historical past also supports it. In reality, in Iran, as in elsewhere in the Middle East, the only obstacle to civil society is the state." Mesbah-Yazdi, however, stated: "It doesn't matter what the people think. The people are ignorant sheep."

In the February 2004 Parliament elections, the twelve-member Council of Guardians, half of whom are appointed by the Supreme Leader, disqualified thousands of candidates, including many of the reformist parliament members and all the candidates of the Islamic Iran Participation Front party from running. It did not allow 80 members of the 6th Iranian parliament (including the deputy speaker) to run. Apart from Khamenei, many conservative theorists such as Afrough supported the decision of the council and accused the reformist parliament members of "being liberal, secular and with no Iranian identity". Referring to 7th parliament members, Ali Meshkini said of the list of candidates signed by Imam Mahdi: "...I have a special gratitude for Honorable Baqiyatullah (aj), whom when seven months ago during the Night of Power the Divine angels presented him with the list of the names and addresses of the members of the (new) parliament, His Eminency signed all of them...".

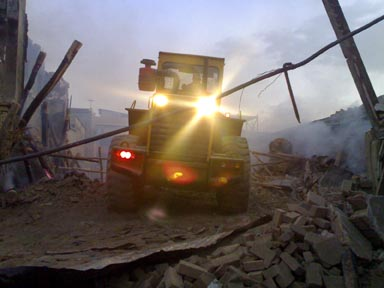
On 11 November 2007, Clerics and Basij paramilitary force attacked people of Gonabadi faith in Borujerd. Gonabadi's buildings and mosques were destroyed and many poor people and dervishes were harshly beaten and arrested.

In 2007, Khamenei claimed that "Today, homosexuality is a major problem in the western world. They [Western nations] however ignore it. But the reality is that homosexuality has become a serious challenge, pain and unsolvable problem for the intellectuals in the west." Khamenei, however did not name any individuals.

While Iran was quick to condemn attacks on Shia mosques and Shia holy places all over the world, it has been intolerant toward other religions. For instance in 2006, authorities in the city of Qom arrested more than 1,000 followers of Islam's Sufi tradition. On 14 February 2006 Kayhan quoted senior clerics in Qom as saying that Sufism should be eradicated there, while Reuters news agency reported that in September one hard-line cleric, Grand Ayatollah Hossein Noori Hamedani, called for a clampdown on Sufis in Qom. In 2006, Iranian president Mahmoud Ahmadinejad launched a plan to suppress what he called "indecent religious associations that work under the cover of spirituality and Sufism". Morteza Agha-Tehrani, disciple of Mesbah-Yazdi and moral advisor to President Ahmadinejad was the leader of a raid on Sufi mosques in Qom.

== Criticism of Islamist interpretation of Islam ==
Islamic scholarship in Iran has a long tradition of debate and critique. This tradition poses a challenge to the constitutional order, as seminary-trained scholars studied basic issues of state legitimacy, in particular the state's right to insist on interpretive closure. For example, Mesbah-Yazdi, son of the late Shaykh Abdolkarim Haeri, the founding member of the Qom Theology School, wrote a book about criticism of velayat-e faqıh. The regime responded with force, convening special clergy courts to silence and imprison scholars, in violation of seminary norms of scholarly debate. These conspicuous acts of discipline seem to have backfired, as each escalating punishment has generated new critics.

In Iran epistemological debates have political implications. Because the Islamic Republic stakes its legitimacy on the scholarly authority of its jurist-ruler, the regime takes such debates quite seriously. Through the Special Clergy Court, the regime has tried to clamp down on relativism, calling it self-defeating. Dissident seminarians have distanced themselves from relativism, calling themselves legitimate religious authorities. It is unclear how the dissidents reconcile the two seminary norms of open debate and scholarly authority, or what political ramifications might follow from such a reconciliation. The dissidents are creating an unprecedentedly rich documentary record of Islamic critique of the Islamic state.

== Future of fundamentalism ==
Abdolkarim Soroush, advocate of Islamic pluralism, claimed that fundamentalism will self-destruct as it is afflicted with an internal contradiction, which will shatter it from within. Similar ideas have been put forward by Saeed Hajjarian. Abdolkarim Soroush, Mohsen Kadivar, Saeed Hajjarian and Seyyed Hossein Nasr are notable critics of fundamentalism in Iran. Iranian neofundamentalists became a substantial minority in Qom seminaries. However, they enjoy support from two Grand Marjas, namely Nasser Makarem Shirazi and Hossein Noori Hamedani as well as direct support from Khamenei.

== See also ==
- 1988 executions of Iranian prisoners
- Abdallah Mazandarani
- Chain murders of Iran
- Cinema Rex Fire
- History of the Islamic Republic of Iran
- Iran student riots, July 1999
- Iranian principlists
- Iran's Cultural Revolution of 1980–1987
- Liberalism in Iran
- Mirza Ali Aqa Tabrizi
- Mirza Husayn Tehrani
- Mirza Sayyed Mohammad Tabatabai
- Muhammad Kazim Khurasani
- Persianization
- Religious intellectualism in Iran
- Religious traditionalism in Iran
- Ruhollah Khomeini
- Seyyed Abdollah Behbahani

== Bibliography ==
=== Books ===
- Abrahamian, Ervand (1982). Iran Between Two Revolutions. Princeton, NJ: Princeton University Press. ISBN 9780691053424. OCLC 7975938.
- Abrahamian, Ervand (1993). Khomeinism: Essays on the Islamic Republic. California: University of California Press. ISBN 0520081730.
- Calvert, John (July 2010). Sayyid Qutb and the Origins of Radical Islamism. London, UK: Hurst Publishers. ISBN 9781849040068.
- Farzaneh, Mateo Mohammad (March 2015). Iranian Constitutional Revolution and the Clerical Leadership of Khurasani. Syracuse, NY: Syracuse University Press. ISBN 9780815633884. OCLC 931494838.
- Byrne, Malcolm (2004). "Introduction". In Gasiorowski, Mark J.; Byrne, Malcolm (eds.). Mohammad Mosaddeq and the 1953 Coup in Iran. Syracuse University Press. p. xiv.
- Graham, Robert (1980). Iran, the Illusion of Power. St. Martin's Press. ISBN 0-312-43588-6.
- Kadivar, محسن کدیور (2008). سیاست نامه خراسانی (in Persian). تہران: انتشارات کویر.
- Kepel, Gilles (2002). Jihad: The Trail of Political Islam. Harvard University Press. ISBN 978-0674010901.
- Khomeini, Ruhollah (1981). Algar, Hamid (ed.). Islam and Revolution : Writing and Declarations of Imam Khomeini. Translated by Algar, Hamid. Berkeley, CA: Mizan Press. ISBN 9781483547541.
- Keddie, Nikki R. (1966). Religion and Rebellion in Iran: The Tobacco Protest of 1891–92. Frank Cass. ISBN 9780714619712.
- Kurzman, Charles (2004). The Unthinkable Revolution in Iran. Harvard University Press. ISBN 0-674-01328-X.
- Bayat, Mangol (1991). Iran's First Revolution: Shi'ism and the Constitutional Revolution of 1905-1909. doi:10.1093/oso/9780195068221.001.0001. ISBN 978-0-19-506822-1.
- Mackey, Sandra; Harrop, Scott (1998). The Iranians: Persia, Islam and the Soul of a Nation. Penguin. ISBN 978-0-452-27563-8.
- Moin, Baqer (2015). Khomeini: Life of the Ayatollah. Macmillan. ISBN 978-1-4668-9306-1.
- Rahnema, Ali (1 November 2005). Pioneers of Islamic Revival. London, UK: Zed Books. ISBN 9781842776155.
- Rahnema, Ali (2000). An Islamic Utopian - A Political Biography of Ali Shari'ati. London, NY: I.B. Tauris. ISBN 1860645526.
- Roy, Olivier (1994). The Failure of Political Islam. Harvard University Press. ISBN 978-0-674-29141-6. OCLC 1154138810.
- Sayej, Caroleen Marji (2018). Patriotic Ayatollahs. doi:10.7591/cornell/9781501715211.001.0001. ISBN 978-1-5017-1521-1.
- Wilford, Hugh (2013). America's Great Game: The CIA's Secret Arabists and the Making of the Modern Middle East. Basic Books. ISBN 978-0-465-01965-6.

=== Articles ===
- Akhavi, Shahrough (1996). "Contending Discourses in Shi'i Law on the Doctrine of Wilāyat al-Faqīh". Iranian Studies. 29 (3–4): 229–268. doi:10.1080/00210869608701850.
- Aziz, T. M. (May 1993). "The Role of Muhammad Baqir al-Sadr in Shi'i Political Activism in Iraq from 1958 to 1980". International Journal of Middle East Studies. 25 (2): 207–222. doi:10.1017/S0020743800058499. JSTOR 164663.
- Behdad, Sohrab (January 1997). "Islamic Utopia in Pre-Revolutionary Iran: Navvab Safavi and the Fada'ian-e Eslam". Middle Eastern Studies. 33 (1): 40–65. doi:10.1080/00263209708701141. JSTOR 4283846.
- Bohdan, Siarhei (Summer 2020). ""They Were Going Together with the Ikhwan": The Influence of Muslim Brotherhood Thinkers on Shi'i Islamists during the Cold War". The Middle East Journal. 74 (2): 243–262. doi:10.3751/74.2.14.
- Fuchs, Simon Wolfgang (24 May 2021). "A Direct Flight to Revolution: Maududi, Divine Sovereignty, and the 1979-Moment in Iran". Journal of the Royal Asiatic Society. 32 (2): 333–354. doi:10.1017/S135618632100033X.
- Fuchs, Simon Wolfgang (July 2014). "Third Wave Shi'ism: Sayyid Arif Husain al-Husaini and the Islamic Revolution in Pakistan". Journal of the Royal Asiatic Society. 24 (3): 493–510. doi:10.1017/S1356186314000200. JSTOR 43307315.
- Hermann, Denis (1 May 2013). "Akhund Khurasani and the Iranian Constitutional Movement". Middle Eastern Studies. 49 (3): 430–453. doi:10.1080/00263206.2013.783828. JSTOR 23471080.
- Keddie, Nikki R. (June 1983). "Iranian Revolutions in Comparative Perspective". The American Historical Review. 88 (3): 579–598. doi:10.2307/1864588. JSTOR 1864588.
- Khalaji, Mehdi (27 November 2009). "The Dilemmas of Pan-Islamic Unity". Current Trends in Islamist Ideology. 9: 64–79.
- Martin, V. A. (April 1986). "The Anti-Constitutionalist Arguments of Shaikh Fazlallah Nuri". Middle Eastern Studies. 22 (2): 181–196. doi:10.1080/00263208608700658. JSTOR 4283111.
- Mashayekhi, Azadeh (December 2015). "Tehran, the Scene of Modernity in the Pahlavi Dynasty: Modernisation and Urbanisation Processes 1925–1979". In F. Arefian; S. Moeini (eds.). Urban Change in Iran. The Urban Book Series. pp. 103–119. doi:10.1007/978-3-319-26115-7_9. ISBN 978-3-319-26113-3.
- Nouraie, Fereshte M. (1975). "The Constitutional Ideas of a Shi'ite Mujtahid: Muhammad Husayn Na'ini". Iranian Studies. 8 (4): 234–247. doi:10.1080/00210867508701501. ISSN 0021-0862. JSTOR 4310208.
