= Ahmad Aghalou =

Iranian actor

- احمد آقالو
- Born: 1 October 1949; Tehran, Iran
- Died: 23 November 2008 (aged 59); Tehran, Iran
- Occupation: Actor
- Years active: 1983–2008

Ahmad Aghalou (Persian: احمد آقالو; also Romanized as Ahmad Āghālu; 1949 in Qazvin – 2008 in Tehran) was an Iranian actor.

== Biography ==
Ahmad Aghaloo was born in Qazvin. He was a theater graduate of the Faculty of Fine Arts, University of Tehran. He entered the cinema as an actor by acting in the movie Dadshah in 1983. His last movie was Spadash, in which he starred in 2008.

== Filmography ==
=== Cinema ===
- Dadshah – 1984
- Silk Chains – 1985
- Patal and Little Wishes – 1989
- The Kids from Water and Mud – 1993
- Rich and Poor – 1999
- Look at the Sky – 2002
