= Masoud Dehnamaki =

- مسعود ده‌نمکی
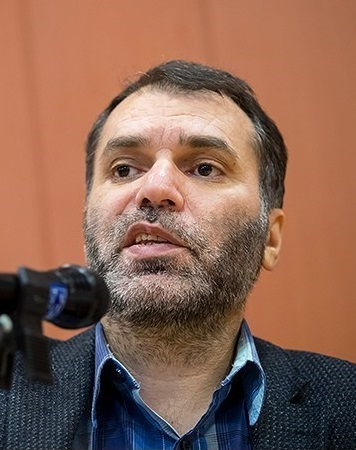
- Dehnamaki speaking at Amir Kabir University in 2016
- Born: December 29, 1969 (age 56); Ahar, Iran
- Occupations: Director, journalist, conservative activist
- Years active: 2004–present
- Political party: Ansar-e-Hezbollah

Masoud Dehnamaki (Persian: مسعود ده‌نمکی, born 1969 in Ahar, East Azerbaijan) is an Iranian conservative activist, filmmaker, and former journalist.

== Early life ==
Dehnamaki says that he was a member of the army that liberated Khoramshahr in 1982—a decisive turning point in Iran–Iraq War.

== Activism ==
Dehnamaki was mostly unknown until he started his activities with Ansar-e Hezbollah. Dehnamaki has been for years the General Commander of the notorious Ansar Hezbollah and a leader of Baseej vigilantes who aggressively attacked conferences and festivals. For years, Massoud Dehnamaki was known widely as the feared enforcer of conservative rules that restricted freedom for women and society. He used to break-up peaceful gatherings, attack speakers, and bring motorcycle vigilantes into streets.

Dehnamaki was involved in the Tehran University student riots in July 1999. Several students who were protesting that night for the closure of "Salam" and were subsequently beaten up by the attackers have told the investigation committee that Mr. Dehnamaki was among the ones who were directing the brutal night raid.

In 2002, Ansar e Hezbollah, hardline group best known for disrupting reformist gatherings and beating up students declared a "holy war" to rid Iran of reformers who promote Western democracy and challenge the country's supreme leader. Masoud Dehnamaki, an ideologue with the group, also said that Iranians who try to appease Iran's enemies such as the United States "should be stopped."

== Journalism ==
He was a managing director of Do-Kouheh weekly, Jebheh weekly, Shalamcheh weekly, Ansar-e Hezbollah weekly Yalasarat, and Sobh magazine, all close to conservative ideology. Shalamcheh and Jebheh were closed by Tehran's Press Court. Shalamcheh was banned by the Iranian court reportedly for "insulting a source of emulation".

== Film career ==
In 2002 he directed Poverty and Prostitution, a documentary on prostitution that traces its roots to the evils of poverty. His documentary shows the rampant prostitution that is so strictly forbidden and suppressed by the Islamic Regime in control of the country. Prostitution in Iran is a taboo and therefore not directly discussed or addressed, allowing for the problem to spiral out of control.

In 2004 Dehnamaki directed Which Blue, Which Red (2004).

Massoud Dehnamaki's debut feature film Ekhrajiha (The Outcasts) (2006), also called Expelled, tells the story of Majid, a gangster from south Tehran who falls in love with Narges, the daughter of Mirza, a pious man. Majid must reform himself to marry Narges, so he decides to head to the Iranian warfront and his protégés also follow him.

The film set a box-office record in Iran.

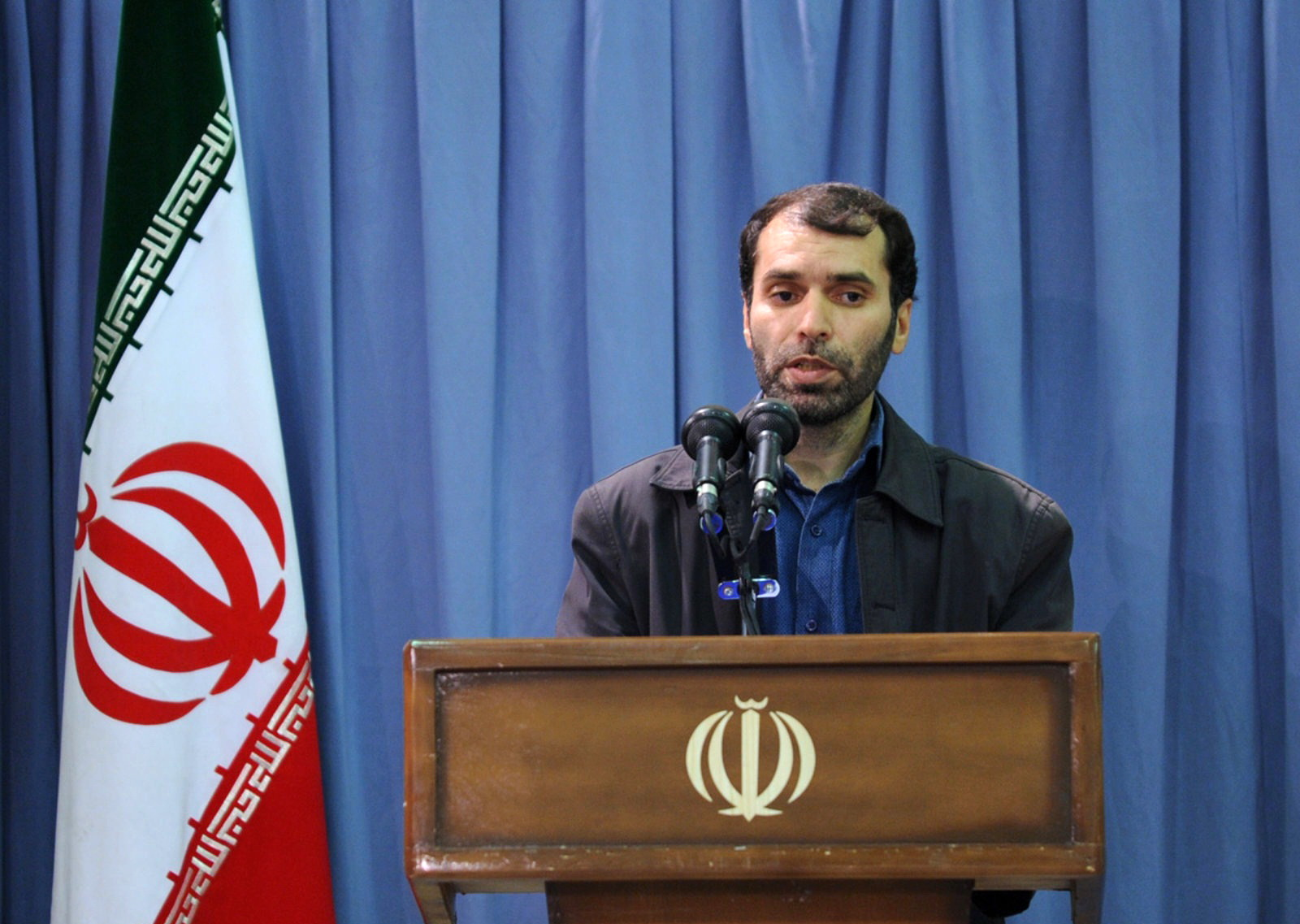
Dehnamaki in a meeting with Ayatollah Ali Khamenei

His most recent film, Ekhrajijha 3 (Outcasts 3) (2011), is a political comedy that follows a group of Iran–Iraq War veterans, two of the most power-hungry of which run for president of Iran and lie, cheat and organize illegal late-night parties to win the hearts of Iran's young people. Dehnamaki denies any similarity between his film’s characters and any real-life figures, but the film's two villains resemble the official government image of incarcerated presidential challengers Mir Hossein Moussavi and Mehdi Karroubi. Dehnamaki maintains he is an independent artist, but Ekhrajijha 3 has been heavily promoted on state TV and Dehnamaki had sufficient influence to be granted permission to shoot scenes of big political rallies in the center of Tehran, gatherings that many mistook for anti-government demonstrations. It is even rumored that free tickets were handed out to government employees in order to boost the success of the film in the box office. Many critics and film fans have pointed out the cinematic weaknesses of the film. This film was released around the same time as the internationally acclaimed and Academy Award–nominated movie A Separation. Dehnamaki's film received much more success in the box office (breaking the record for the most selling film in Iranian history). Dehnamaki was very critical of A Separation and has expressed his indignation that the Iranian opposition has called for a boycott of his film in favour of A Separation.

== Viewpoints ==
Dehnamaki believes Iran needs to modernize, within the confines of a strict Islam, but not Taliban-style. "If we are against the Islam that the Taliban introduced, we must be able to offer a good model of the Islam that we believe is the source of compassion and kindness," he said. "But it has to be according to the needs of today so that it would be acceptable to our youth." "There was a time that I believed that the people were the problem. But that was a mistake. The real problems are our rulers, who have become used to corruption and cannot fulfill the promises of the early days of the revolution about social justice and equality." In 2006, Dehnamaki wrote an open letter to the president Mahmoud Ahmadinejad warning him against his "fundamentalist and backward supporters," those people "who reduced promotion of virtue and prevention of vice to fighting against women's dress, and ignored justice in society."

== Books ==
- Ketābshenāsi-e Esārat (Persian: کتاب‌شناسی اسارت; lit.: Captivity Bibliography)

== See also ==
- History of political Islam in Iran
