= Kifayat al-Usul =

Kifayat al-Usul (Arabic: كفاية الاصول) (Sufficiency of Principles) is a two-volume book that contains the most notable works of Akhund Khorasani in the field of Principles of Islamic jurisprudence (Usul al-Fiqh). Kifayat al-Usul is often used in the advanced classes at Shi'ite seminaries all-over the world as the main text on the methodology of law.

== Author ==
Mohammad Kazem Khorasani, or Akhund-e Khorasani, was a Twelver Shi'a Marja', politician, philosopher, and reformer. He was also one of the main clerical supporters of the Iranian Constitutional Revolution. He is regarded as one of the most important Shia Mujtahids of all times, and the title Akhund (the scholar) is almost exclusively used for him. He started to deliver his lectures at Najaf seminary in 1874 CE, when his mentor Syed Mirza Muhammad Hasan Shirazi left for Samarra and appointed him as his successor. He became a source of emulation in 1895 and He taught for years in Najaf till his death in 1911 CE and trained a significant number of students from different regions of the Shi'ite world. All major Shia jurists in the twentieth century were in some way related to his circle. He was known for his credibility, independent thinking and intellectual rigor.

He is known for using his position as a Marja as legitimizing force behind the first democratic revolution of Asia that happened in Iran (1905–1911), where he was the main clerical supporter of the revolution. He believed that the democratic form of government would be the best possible choice in the absence of Imam and regarded the democratic constitutional revolution a Jihad (holy war) in which all Muslims had to participate. Along with Mirza Husayn Tehrani and Shaikh Abdallah Mazandarani, he led people against what they called a “state tyranny” and issued fatwas and “sent telegrams to tribal chiefs, prominent national and political leaders, and heads of state in England, France, Germany, and Turkey”. When Mohammad Ali Shah Qajar became king of Iran, Mohammad Kazim Khorasani sent him a “ten-point” instruction including points on protecting Islam, promoting domestic industries and modern science, stopping colonial intervention in Iran “while retaining diplomatic relations”, and establishing “justice and equality”.

== Concept of the book ==
Kifayat al-Usul is divided into two volumes. The first volume contains verbal proofs (al-adella al-lafẓiya), while the second contains rational proofs (al-adella al-aqliya).

=== Definition of Ijtihad ===
Akhund Khurasani says that Ijtihad is a process in which jurist “exerts his full capacity in order to arrive at an opinion based on a legitimate legal judgement.” According to Akhund, a jurist is obliged to take whatever time he needs to read and research into a matter before giving a reasonable judgement. He says that if his effort produces no result, the jurist must not give his opinion. In such a case, the jurist should obtain further knowledge. Followers are free to decide whom to emulate, and the most important traits of the Source of Emulation (Marja) are his openness towards contemporary issues and willingness to explore traditional and non-traditional knowledge to address needs of the community.

=== Ijtihad must be time-sensitive ===
As science and technology progress, social circumstances and lifestyle also change. Language evolves and new concepts emerge. Akhund Khurasani believed that jurisprudential judgement must be time-sensitive. Also, he should be willing to change his opinions based on the needs of the ever changing society. However, he should not interfere in all aspects of people's life, beyond religious affairs. As for the social issues, he favored those reformers who were ready to think outside the box and consider scholarly inputs from other parts of the world. However, his version of secularism was different from western modernists, it was based on the Shia doctrine of occultation of the twelfth imam.

== Importance of the book ==
Developed from Makasib by Morteza Ansari, Kifayat al-Usul has replaced Mirza Qomi's book and Qawanin al-usul as the main text in the advanced classes at Iranian seminaries. This book published in 1903, established Akhund Khorasani as the supreme authority on Shia theology, where he presented the Shi'ite jurisprudential principles in a more rigorous fashion as a unified theory of jurisprudence. It was recently published for 453rd time. This book is considered the pinnacle of advanced theology and foundation of Usul al-Fiqh in Shia seminaries of Najaf and Qom. All major Shia jurists following Akhund Khurasani have written commentaries on it, the best known is written by Ayatullah al-Khoei. This book is one of the study resources for the Assembly of Experts exam.

== See also ==
- Iranian Constitutional Revolution
- Muhammad Kazim Khurasani
- Mirza Husayn Tehrani
- Abdullah Mazandarani
- Muhammad Husayn Na'ini

== Bibliography ==
- Farzaneh, Mateo Mohammad (March 2015). Iranian Constitutional Revolution and the Clerical Leadership of Khurasani. Syracuse, NY: Syracuse University Press. ISBN 9780815633884. OCLC 931494838.
- Hermann, Denis (1 May 2013). "Akhund Khurasani and the Iranian Constitutional Movement". Middle Eastern Studies. 49 (3): 430–453. doi:10.1080/00263206.2013.783828. ISSN 0026-3206. JSTOR 23471080. S2CID 143672216.
- AḴŪND ḴORĀSĀNĪ, Encyclopædia Iranica
