= Makasib =

Kitab al-Makasib or Makasib (Arabic: كتاب المكاسب, lit. 'Transactions') is a two-volume Twelver Shi'ah legal manual of Islamic commercial law written on Fiqh by Morteza Ansari. It remains a key textbook in the modern Hawza and has been the subject of numerous commentaries. Makasib and the notable work of Akhund Khorasani, Kefayah al-osul, are taught in advanced classes at the seminaries. This book is one of the resources for the examination of the Assembly of Experts.

== Author ==
Sheikh Morteza Ansari (1781, Dezful – 1864, Najaf) was one of the most influential Shia scholars of the 19th century. He trained more than a thousand students. He was the leading Shia scholar in the late Qajar period. After Muhammad Hasan al-Najafi, Ansari became the general Marja' of Shia. Two of his most significant works are Makasib and Faraed al-Osul, which are both used as textbooks on Shia law.

== Concept of the book ==
This book has three sections. The first section is about forbidden transactions (Arabic: مکاسب المحرمه), the second is about sale (Arabic: بیع), and the third is about options in the sale (Arabic: خیارات). The end of the book is devoted to other issues, such as Taqiya, inheritance, and rada.

== Commentaries ==
Makasib has been the subject of commentaries by Sheikh Abbas Qomi, Akhund Khorasani, Muhammad Hossein Naini, Agha Zia Addin Araghi, Mirza Abu'l-Hassan Azarbaijani Meshkini, and Sheikh Mousavi Khansari.

== Editions ==
The first edition of the book was completed in Tehran, 1886–7. The second edition was completed in Qom, and the last and popular (incomplete) edition was written by Muḥammad Kalāntar in five volumes in Najaf, 1972–5.

=== Corrected editions ===
There are numerous corrected editions of Makasib. One of the editions was done by the Shaykh Ansari Congress; the first volume was published by 1415 AH and other volumes, namely, volumes 2–6, were gradually published until 1420 AH. The corrected edition was produced using one manuscript version and six printed ones. Another corrected edition was done by Hossein Amr Allahi and Muhammad Reza Fakir and issued by the institute of Islamic publication in Qom.

== See also ==
- Usul al-Fiqh
- Ayatollah Khomeini
