= Mirza Sayyed Mohammad Tabatabai =

Iraqi Shi'a theologian (1842–1920)

Grand Ayatollah Sayyid Mirza Muhammad Tabatabaei
- میرزا محمد طباطبایی
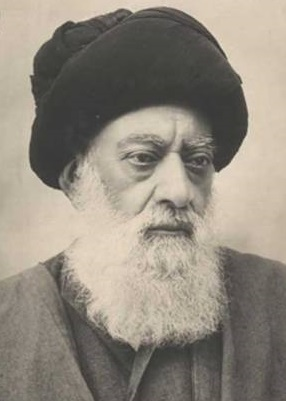

Personal life
- Born: December 22, 1842 Karbala, Baghdad Vilayet, Ottoman Empire
- Died: January 28, 1920 (aged 77) Karbala, Mandatory Iraq
- Resting place: Shah Abdol-Azim Shrine
- Parent: Sadiq al-Tabatabaei (father)

Religious life
- Religion: Islam
- Jurisprudence: Twelver Shia Islam

Mirza Seyyed Mohammad Tabatabai (Persian: آیت الله میرزا سید محمد طباطبائی, also known as Mohammad Sang-e-laji,; (Note: Sang-e-laj (سَنگِلَج) is one of the neighbourhoods of the Old Tehran, not far from the Grand Bazar of Tehran. The Sang-e-laj Theatre, one of the oldest theatre halls in Iran, which is still in use, is located in this neighbourhood. For further information, consult the entry Sang-e-laj in The Persian Wikipedia.) 22 December 1842 – 28 January 1920) was one of the leaders of the Iranian Constitutional Revolution (1905–1911) who played an important role in the establishment of democracy and rule of law in Iran. He was the son of Sayyed Sādegh Tabātabā'i, one of the influential Scholar during the reign of Naser ad-Din Shah Qajar. His paternal grandfather, Sayyed Mehdi Tabātabā'i, was a reputed clergy in Hamedan. He is the father of Sayyed Sādegh Tabātabā'i editor of Ruznāmeh-ye Majles, the Majles newspaper.

He is entombed inside a family tomb in Shah-Abdol-Azim shrine in Rey.

== Biography ==
Mirzā Sayyed Mohammad Tabātabā'i was born in Karbala, Iraq. The family moved to Hamedan when he was two years old, and to Tehran, when he was eight. He received education in the sciences, (Arabic) literature, Islamic jurisprudence and doctrines from his father, and philosophy from Mirzā Abol-Hasan Jelveh. For a period of time he was also a pupil of Sahaikh Hadi Najmābādi. The latter has been the spiritual father of a number of individuals who later played significant roles in bringing about the Constitutional Revolution of Iran, such as Ali-Akbar Dehkhoda and Mirza Jahangir Khan Sur-e Esrafil.

In 1881 he left Iran for the purpose of Hajj, however as a result of his late arrival, he undertook an Umrah Hajj, after which he settled in Samarra, Iraq, where he became a pupil of Ayatollah Mirzā Mohammad Hasan Hosseini Shirāzi and completed his studies with him. Following the death of his father, he took his entire family to Samarra and for some ten years advised Ayatollah Shirāzi on political matters. On the recommendation of Ayatollah Shirāzi, he finally returned to Tehran. Due to his independent mind, in Tehran he kept away from state officials and individuals in positions of power. In his public speeches, he emphasized on the merits of freedom and incessantly stirred up the sense of loving freedom amongst his audiences. In this, he went so far as to suggesting republicanism as a viable alternative to monarchism. His latter views polarised his audiences, driving some away, and attracting some more closely instead. His ascetic lifestyle, however, very effectively protected him against personal attacks by his detractors. His emphasis permanently revolved around a national government, respect for the rule of law, equality before law, and the indiscriminate application of justice in the society.

=== Constitutional Revolution ===
The spark leading to the Constitutional Revolution of Iran is by some held to be the foot whipping of some sugar merchants in Tehran in December 1905, by the then Governor of Tehran, Ahmad Alā od-Dowleh, for disobeying the government order to lower the price of sugar. Following this event, a large number of people from Bazaar, together with some clergy, took sanctuary (known as Bast) in Shah's Mosque (Masjed-e Shah – Imam Khomeini Mosque since 1979) in Tehran. They were forcibly removed from this place by the agents of the then Chief Minister of Mozaffar ad-Din Shah, Ain ad-Dowleh. Following this, on the suggestion of Sayyed Mohammad Tabātabā'i a large number of Ulema of Tehran retired to Shah-Abdol-Azim shrine and formulated a set of demands to be presented to Mozaffar ad-Din Shah. The single most important demand to be made at this juncture from Shah turned out to be the demand for establishing an Edālat'khāneh (عدالتخانه - House of Justice), of which the specifics were left unspecified. According to Keddie, this lack of detail may have been intended for preserving unity amongst the more radical modernizers and the traditional Ulema. Mozaffar ad-Din Shah accepted the demand for setting up an Edālat'khāneh and for good measure also dismissed the unpopular Governor of Tehran. Following this, the Ulema ceased their protest and returned to Tehran. The Edālat'khāneh was to be the genesis of what later became Iran's Majles.

Mozaffar ad-Din Shah and his Chief Minister, Ain od-Dowleh, reneged however on their promises. Not only did they not establish an Edālat'khāneh, but violence against people continued unabated, both in Tehran and in other provinces of Iran. At this stage popular preachers such as Sayyed Jamal ad-Din Esfahani (father of the Iranian writer Mohammad-Ali Jamalzadeh) and Shaikh Mohammad Vā'ez began their most vociferous attacks on the establishment. This led to Sayyed Jamal ad-Din Esfahani being ordered to leave Tehran, an act that led to strong protests by the public. In the course of ousting Sayyed Jamal ad-Din Esfahani from Tehran was shot dead by an officer, an event that led to a large mass of clergy leaving Tehran in protest and taking Bast in Qom in July 1906. This move was followed by between 12,000 and 14,000 merchants and tradesmen taking Bast in the British Legation in Tehran, bringing the commerce in Tehran to virtual standstill. In passing, it should be remarked that the orthodox historical view in the present-day Iran is that the role of the British at this juncture in the history of Iran was by no means a benevolent one, but calculated, the calculation being aimed at marginalising the religious elements of the revolutionary movement. It is well known that it was for exactly the lack of clarity as regards the role of Islam in a post-revolution era that such Constitutional Revolutionary of the first hour as Sheikh Fazlollah Noori came to take the side of Mohammad-Ali Shah and became an anti-revolutionary. (Note: The Officiate Website of Iranian Institute for Contemporary Historical Studies (مؤسسۀ مطالعات تاریخ معاصر ایران) should be consulted. In particular, this article, in Persian, by Dr Farzad Jahān'bin, is worth considering. The idea being advanced is that whereas the taking of Bast of between some 12,000 to 14,000 men in the British Legation in Tehran seems to have been spontaneous, preparations for hosting such large numbers (providing for both meals and sanitation of the individuals taking the Bast) had been in the making for months in advance. There are eye-witness reports indicating how months in advance of the event, the British middlemen had been purchasing large quantities of rice and other foodstuff in various food markets in and around Tehran and transported these at night-times into the complex housing the British Legation in Tehran.) After the Iranian Revolution of 1979, the status of Sheikh Fazlollah Noori as a revolutionary has been fully restored. (Note: According to Keddie (2003), p. 180, "The third main leader of the Tehran ulema, Shaikh Fazlollah Nuri [the other two being Mirzā Sayyed Mohammad Tabātabā'i and Ayatollah Sayyed Abdollah Behbahāni], did turn against the movement once it became clear that the constitution was not going to reinstate the sharia, but bring in many Western-style institutions and laws.")

During this time Iranians began to increase their demands, demanding not only the dismissal of Shah's Chief Minister, Ain od-Dowleh, but also establishment of a national consultative assembly, what came to be known as, and become, Majles. The name of Mashrouteh (مشروطه), signifying a new political system, was floated around this time. (Note: The orthodox viewpoint in contemporary Iran (consult Iranian Institute for Contemporary Historical Studies) is that the word Mashrouteh (مشروطه), in opposition to Mashrou'eh (مشروعه) (meaning, based on religion or based on religious traditions), was insinuated and popularised by the British. According to Dehkhoda Dictionary (3rd edition, Tehran University Press, 2006), Mashrouteh is a form of state government according to which introduction and elimination of laws are the sole prerogatives of Parliament, or Houses of Parliament. In this connection, Sheikh Fazlollah Noori insisted on a Mashrou'eh form of government, according to which the sole role of Majles would be the safeguarding of the Islamic laws.) At the end of July 1906, Mozaffar al-Din Shah dismissed his unpopular Chief Minister Ain od-Dowleh, and in early August 1906 he accepted the proposed institution of Majles. The first Majles came into being in October 1906, immediately after the Deputies of Tehran were elected. A committee of experts drafted the Fundamental Law, which Mozaffar al-Din Shah signed, after some delay, in December 1906. A longer Supplementary Fundamental Law, drafted in 1907, was signed by the new Shah, Mohammad-Ali Shah, in October 1907 (Mozaffar al-Din Shah died on 3 January 1907). These two charters formed the core of the Iranian written Constitution, to be supplanted by a new written Constitution after the Revolution of 1979.

The rules governing the election of Deputies of Majles were originally drafted by Mozaffar al-Din Shah. His delay in making this document available led Mirzā Sayyed Mohammad Tabātabā'i to visiting him personally at Sāheb'qrāniyeh Palace for enquiry. He left the Palace with the draft of these regulations in his hands. After some changes in this draft, it was finally ratified by Mozaffar al-Din Shah. Copies of this were subsequently dispatched to all cities in Iran. This event was celebrated on Monday 10 September 1906 by ornamenting the streets of Tehran with decorative light bulbs.

Tabatabai died in Tehran in 1920, at the age of 77.

=== As deputy ===
Of the religious minority groups in Iran, only Zoroastrians had a Zoroastrian Deputy in First Majles. During the legislative period of this Majles, Sayyed Mohammad Tabātabā'i deputised also the Iranian Christians in Majles. During this period, the Iranian Jewish community were deputised by Ayatollah Sayyed Abdollah Behbahāni.

=== As private person ===
According to Keddie, Sayyed Mohammad Tabātabā'i "appears to have had genuinely liberal proclivities and considerable contact with other liberals, believed that a constitution would be the best way to limit the power of uncontrolled autocrats who were selling Iran to the Western powers."

With the sudden rise in the price of sugar in 1905 (see above), Sayyed Mohammad Tabātabā'i proposed that instead of serving tea at religious gatherings, such as at Rozeh-Khāni's, the poor be given cash. In making this suggestion, he was also aiming at improving the state of public health, as he believed that not in all large gatherings the tea was being served in hygienically clean utensils, thus spreading transferable diseases amongst the population.

== School and modern teaching methods ==
Sayyed Mohammad Tabātabā'i founded the Islāmieh School (مدرسه اسلامیه) in Tehran where modern teaching methods were used. He appointed his brother, Assad'o'llah Tabātabā'i, as the Head of this school. During a celebration, on 28 October 1905, Sayyed Mohammad Tabātabā'i delivered a speech to the school in which he expanded on the necessity of learning and establishment of modern schools in Iran.

== See also ==
- Muhammad Kazim Khurasani
- Mirza Ali Aqa Tabrizi
- Tobacco Protest
- Iran-United Kingdom relations
- Iran-Russia relations
