= Seyyed Abdollah Behbahani =

Persian Shi'a theologian (1840–1910)

- عبدالله بهبهانی
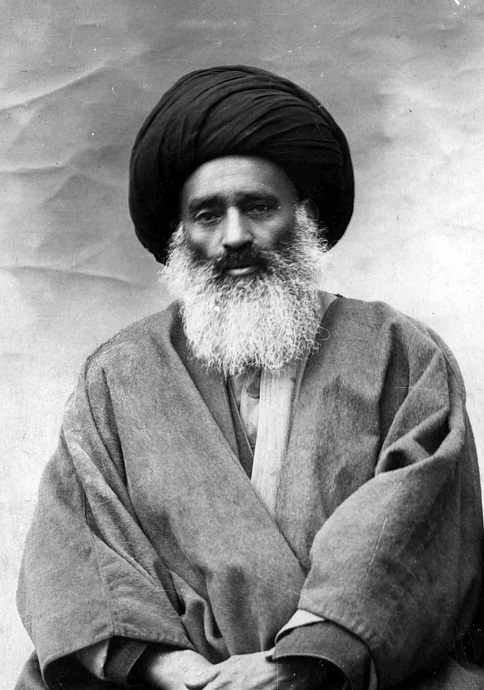

Personal life
- Born: 1840 Najaf, Ottoman Empire
- Died: 1910 (aged 69–70) Tehran, Sublime State of Iran
- Era: Persian Constitutional Revolution

Religious life
- Religion: Islam
- Denomination: Shia Islam
- Jurisprudence: Twelver

Abdollah Behbahani (Persian: سیدعبدالله بهبهانی, 1840–1910) was a Shi'a theologian and a prominent leader of the constitutional movement. He was born in Najaf and was educated by scholars such as Morteza Ansari. During the constitutional movement he was influential in the Majlis. On the night of 15 July 1910, four gunmen attacked his house and killed him. Seyyed Hassan Taghizadeh was suspected to be responsible, and he subsequently fled the country.

== Early life ==
Seyyed Abdollah Behbahani was born in Najaf. His father, Seyyed Esmaeil, was a famous scholar in Iran. He was descended from a prominent Shia scholar of Bahrain, Abdollah al-Beladi from the village of al-Gorayfa. He was educated in Najaf by scholars such as Morteza Ansari, Hosayn Kuhkamarai, Mirza Ḥasan Sirazi, and Shaikh Rażi Naǰafi and became qualified to provide religious guidance.

== Political efforts ==
Seyyed Abdollah Behbahani spent much of his life expressing his political views. His campaigns included refusing to participate in the Tobacco Protest; being dissatisfied with the selection of Ein al-Dowleh as grand vizier; desiring to conclude a solidarity treaty with Seyyed Mohammad Tabatabai; agreeing to fight against the ruler at that time (Ahmad Kasravi referred to this treaty as the beginning of the Persian Constitutional Revolution); circulating the photo of Naus (the Belgian supervisor of the Iranian customs) wearing Islamic scholar clothes at a Masquerade ball and asking for him to be dismissed; seeking sanctuary in Rey after objections were raised to the rise in the price of sugar, and punishing the merchants involved; establishing an assembly known as the Islamic seminary aimed at stopping sabotage by Ein al-Dowleh for founding the house of justice; and emigrating to Iraq as a protest against the failures of the government (this migration is now considered to be a major migration). He remained in Iraq until the constitutional decree of Mozaffar ad-Din Shah Qajar. He was in agreement with the participation of Jews and Armenians as deputies in the 1st Iranian Majlis (Persian legislative assembly), he objected to the bombardment of the Majlis by Mohammad Ali Shah Qajar, and he objected to the execution of Sheikh Fazlollah Noori.

=== Leader of constitutional movement ===
After the dissemination of the photo of Naus (the Belgian supervisor of the Iranian customs) at the Masquerade ball wearing the special clothes belonging to an Islamic scholar, Seyyed Abdollah Behbahani showed the photo to people and asked for Naus' dismissal. The fight against the government was started by sending letters to four mujtahid in Tehran. Mirza Sayyed Mohammad Tabatabai accepted his request and a solidarity treaty was concluded between him and Seyyed Abdollah Behbahani. When Mozaffar ad-Din Shah Qajar came back to Iran, at a time when there was increasing dissatisfaction among the people and scholars against the government, and Ein al-Dowleh was finally dismissed, Shah issued a constitutional order. Seyyed Abdollah Behbahani and Mirza Sayyed Mohammad Tabatabai were not deputies or members of the Majlis, but they participated in the whole of the meeting.

== Assassination ==
In the second parliament, the deputies were divided into two groups: ultra progressive and moderate. Behbahani supported the moderate group and became an influential person when differences of opinion arose between the two groups, causing the ultra progressive deputies led by Sayyed Hasan Taqizadeh to dislike him. On the night of Friday 15 July 1910, four gunmen associated with the Social Democrats attacked him at his home and killed him. Seyyed Hassan Taghizadeh was suspected to be responsible, and he subsequently fled the country. Haydar Khan Amo-oghli had organized the assassination. Behbahani's body was transferred to Najaf and buried in the courtyard of the Imam Ali Mosque.

== Books ==
Seyyed Abdollah Behbahani authored Rasael-va-Masael fi fiqh (Dissertations and Problems in fiqh) containing 25 pamphlets each related to one of the problems of fiqh.

== See also ==
- Freemasonry
- Qajar dynasty
- History of fundamentalist Islam in Iran
- Mirza Sayyed Mohammad Tabatabai
- Sheikh Fazlollah Noori
