= Mirza Ali Aqa Tabrizi =

Iranian reformist Shia cleric and nationalist (1861–1911)

Sheikh Mirza Ali Aqa Tabrizi
- ثقة الاسلام میرزا علی آقا تبریزی
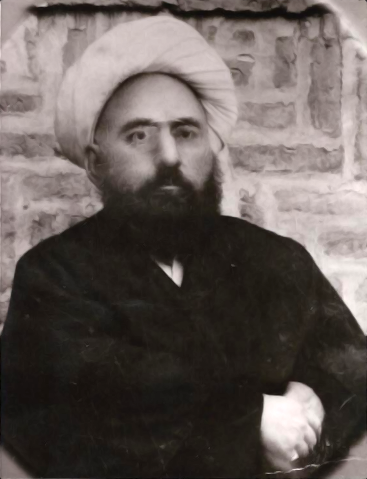
- Jurist
- Title: Thiqat ul-Islam

Personal life
- Born: January 19, 1861 Tabriz, Iran
- Died: December 31, 1911 (aged 50) Tabriz, Iran
- Resting place: Mausoleum of Poets
- Parent: Haj Mirza Sahfie Sadr (father)

Religious life
- Religion: Islam
- Jurisprudence: Twelver Shia Islam

Mirza Ali-Aqa Tabrizi, (Persian: میرزا علی آقا تبریزی) known as Seghatoleslam or Saghatoleslami Tabrizi (Persian: ثقة الاسلام تبریزی; January 19, 1861–December 31, 1911) was an Iranian nationalist who lived in Tabriz, Iran during the Iranian Constitutional Revolution, and a reformist Shia cleric. He was hanged by Russian troops with 12 other Iranians in Bagh-e Shomal at the age of 50 during the Russian Invasion of Tabriz, 1911. He is buried in Mausoleum of Poets, Tabriz.

== Early life and education ==
He was born in Tabriz in 1861. His father Haj Mirza Sahfie Sadr, Seghatoleslami or Saghatoleslami of Tabriz, was a dominant figure in the Tobacco Protest. Ali Aqa studied in Tabriz, Najaf, and Karbala. After the death of his father he was given the title of Thiqat ul-Islam by the king Mozaffar ad-Din Shah Qajar.

== Ideas ==
=== Public awareness ===
He was one of the influential intellectuals among the people of Tabriz. During the first democratic revolution of Asia, the Constitutional Revolution of Iran, one major concern of Akhund Khurasani and other pro-democracy maraji' was to familiarize the public with the idea of a democratic nation-state (Persian: اتحاد دولت و ملت) and modern constitution. The enlightened Thiqa tul-islam from Tabriz, wrote a treatise “Lalan” (Persian: لالان). In his essays, Thiqat al-Islam Tabrizi mentions the sermons he delivered in Tabriz to explain the core concepts of democracy, that helped the junior clerics increase their knowledge about modern statehood and plan their speeches.

=== Views about modern knowledge ===
Seghatoleslami or Saghatoleslami showed unwavering support for modern knowledge and technology, and saw it necessary means to avoid colonial takeover of Iran. He said:

is it not necessary to acquire the same material and moral weapons as the adversary, as recommended by this noble verse: 'Make ready for them all you can of force and horse tethered'? For the moment, these are what give rise to the dominance and the influence of the adversary. Is it not necessary for schools to be built? In accordance with this verse: 'Be hostile to anyone who is hostile towards you, in the measure in which he is hostile to you', we must acquire wealth, the technologies necessary for daily life, political science and knowledge. These are what will allow us to no longer be dependent on foreigners, and this dependence is the primary means by which infidels dominate the land of Islam. Therefore, we must fight them using the same methods that they have used against us.

=== Human liberty ===
Seghatoleslam or Saghatoleslami saw democratic freedom and liberty as God's special gift. He said:

this freedom is like that which the benevolent creator offered to the sons of Israel to free them from Pharaoh.

He saw freedom of press and of personal expression as the instruments for obeying the Quranic command of enjoining the good and forbidding the evil.

=== Confronting bigotry ===
When Fazlullah Nouri tried to get a veto power for his Tehran based mullah-comrades under the banner of Jurist Council, Mirza Ali Aqa opposed the idea saying that only the opinion of the sources of emulation is worthy of consideration in the matters of faith. He wrote:

He who wins his own soul, protects his religion, is against following his desires and is obedient to the command of his Master; that is the person whom the people should take as their model.

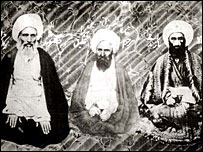
The three Ayatullahs: (left to right) Akhund Khurasani, Mirza Husayn Tehrani and Abdallah Mazandarani.

And

Let us consider the idea that the constitution is against Sharia law: all oppositions of this kind are in vain because the hujjaj al-islam of the atabat, who are today the models (marja') and the refuge (malija) of all Shiites, have issued clear fatwas that uphold the necessity of the Constitution. Aside from their words, they have also shown this by their actions. They see in Constitution the support for splendour of Islam.

He firmly opposed the idea of a supervisory committee of Tehran's clerics censoring the conduct of the parliament, and said that:

this delicate subject shall be submitted to the atabat, . . . we don't have the right to entrust government to a group of four or five mullahs from Tehran.

During the period of “Lesser Despotism”, he played a key role in bringing the people of Tabriz together in support of democracy and tried to minimize bloodshed. Akhund Khurasani wrote a personal letter of support to him, praising his efforts to preserve religious values, educating the public about core national interests, bringing the people and the leadership closer and opposing foreign exploitation.

=== The term Ayatullah ===
He was the first one to use the term Ayatullah for the sources of emulation in Najaf.

== Assassination ==
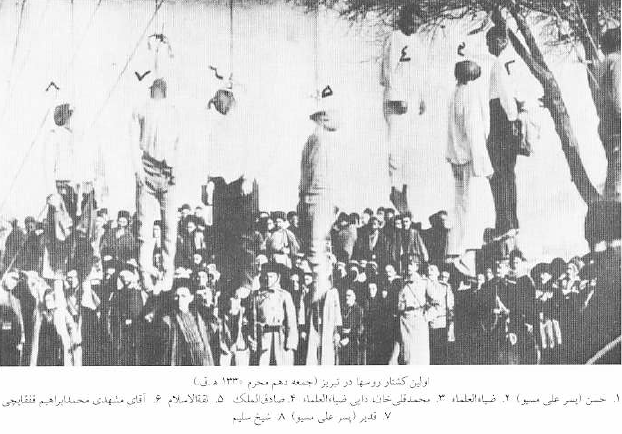
Thiqat ul-Islam is number five from right in first series of execution by Russian forces, 1911.

After the conclusion of the Tabriz Siege by Russian forces a conflict between the Russian forces and the revolutionaries broke out on December 21, 1911. The Russians insisted that he should sign a letter confirming the responsibility of revolutionaries in starting the conflict. He refused, and Russians hanged him with twelve others on the day of Ashura, December 31, 1911. The Russians continued to kill the constitutional revolutionaries of Tabriz and their relatives en masse and many civilians of Tabriz as well. The total number of executions is estimated to have been about 1,200.

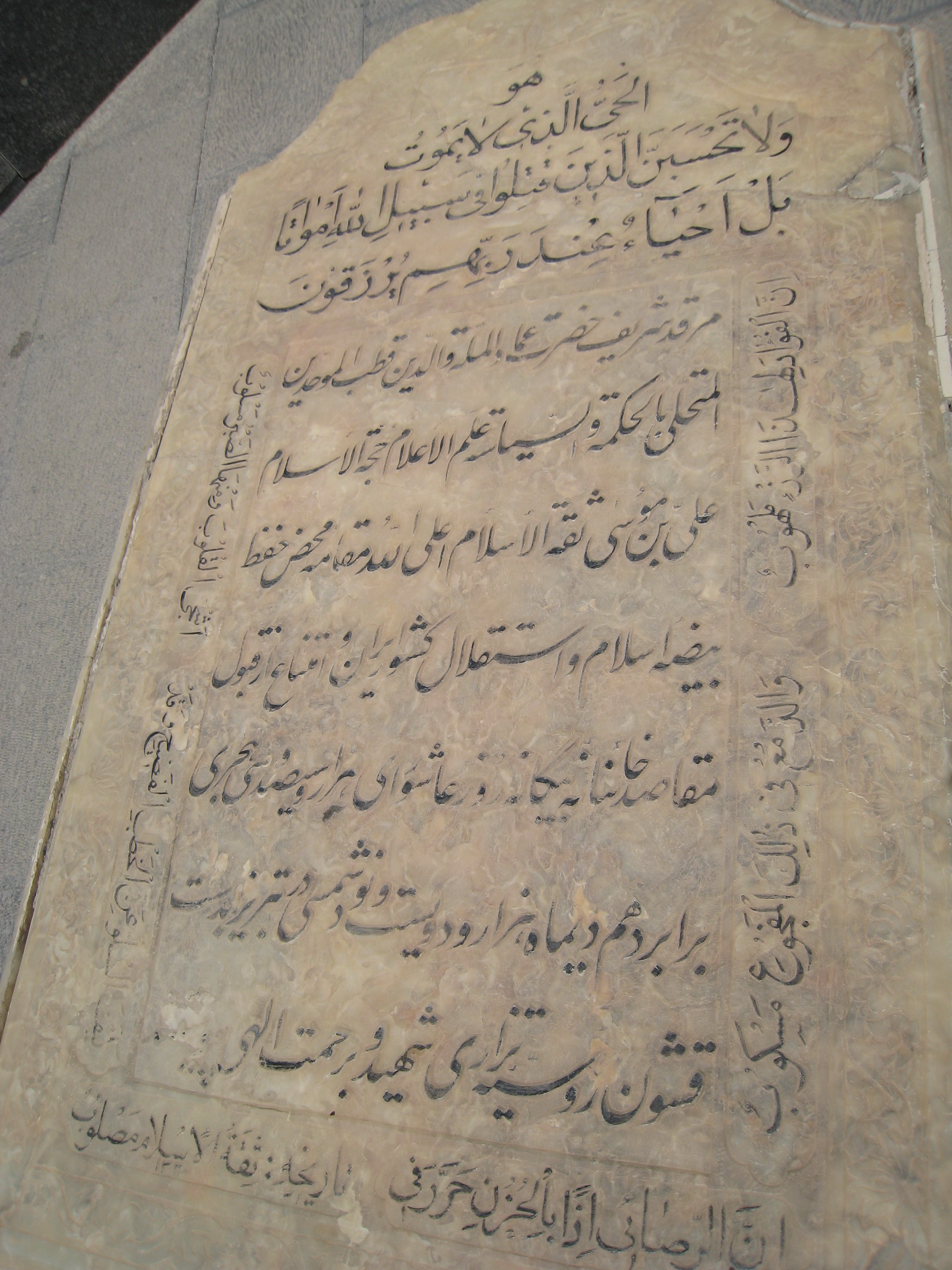
Thiqat ul-Islam's tomb, outside the Mausoleum of Poets building, Tabriz.

The original photography of his hanging is currently shown in Azerbaijan Museum.

=== Legacy ===
His life was depicted in the TV-series Seghatoleslam by Hojjat Ghasem-Zadeh-Asl, produced by Sahar TV (also see the fr:Sahar TV French page).

== See also ==
- Muhammad Kazim Khurasani
- Mirza Husayn Tehrani
- Abdallah Mazandarani
- Iranian Constitutional Revolution
- Intellectual movements in Iran
- Mirza Malkom Khan
- Seghatoleslam
- Mirza Hussein Naini
- Constitution House of Tabriz
- Occupation of Tabriz by Russian army in 1911

== Bibliography ==
- Hermann, Denis (1 May 2013). "Akhund Khurasani and the Iranian Constitutional Movement". Middle Eastern Studies. 49 (3): 430–453. doi:10.1080/00263206.2013.783828. ISSN 0026-3206. JSTOR 23471080. S2CID 143672216.
- Mangol, Bayat (1991). Iran's First Revolution: Shi'ism and the Constitutional Revolution of 1905-1909. Oxford, New York: Oxford University Press. ISBN 978-0-19-506822-1.
- ʿALĪ ĀQĀ TABRĪZĪ, MIRZA, Encyclopædia Iranica
- Farzaneh, Mateo Mohammad (March 2015). Iranian Constitutional Revolution and the Clerical Leadership of Khurasani. Syracuse, NY: Syracuse University Press. ISBN 9780815633884. OCLC 931494838.
