= Asadullah Mamaghani =

Sheikh Asadullah Mamaghani (Persian: اسدالله ممقانی or اسدالله مامقانی; sometimes transliterated Mamqani) was an anti-royalist Persian jurist and clergyman, who helped theorize the relationship between the Pahlavi state and religious leaders.

== Life ==
Asadullah Mamaghani was born in 1881 in Mamqan, and first learned Arab and Persian literature in Tabriz. Following the 1908 bombardment of the Majlis, Mamaghani left for Najaf, where he became one of the foremost disciples of Mohammad-Kazem Khorasani, eventually representing the Najafi exiles in Anjuman Sa'adat.

At the close of World War I, Mamaghani returned to Iran and was immediately offered a position in the Supreme Court, but declined to complete his legal education in Istanbul. He later served as Minister of Justice in the Sa'ed cabinet, after which he was appointed to the Supreme Court.

== Philosophy ==
Mamaghani is known for his clever and innovative theories of Shia jurisprudence. He may be the second generation of Muslim intellectuals to pioneer in the field of religion and state in Iran. Mamaghani challenged conventional wisdom on theories of establishment, arguing that disagreement between the secular power and the (Shia) clerics necessarily leads to popular disaffection and rebellion.
