= Muhammad Kazim Khurasani =

Iranian Shi'a jurist and political activist (1839–1911)

Grand Ayatullah Sheikh Muhammad Kazim Khurasani
- محمدکاظم خراسانی
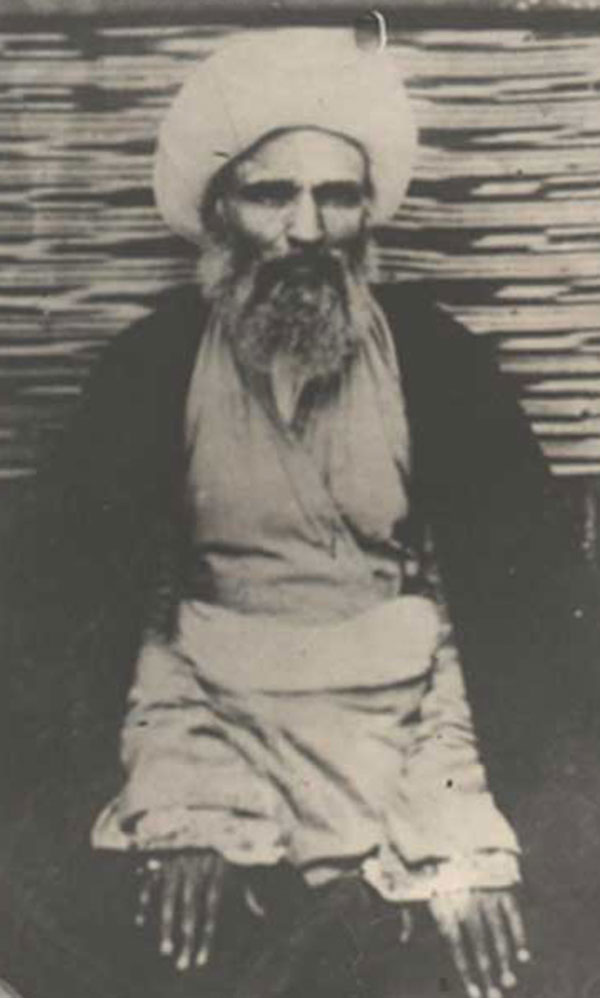

Personal life
- Born: 1839 Mashhad, Sublime State of Persia
- Died: 12 December 1911 (aged 71–72) Najaf, Ottoman Empire (present-day Iraq)
- Resting place: Imam Ali Shrine
- Parent: Mulla Husayn Herati (father)
- Region: Najaf, Iraq
- Notable work: Kifayat al-Usul

Religious life
- Religion: Islam
- Denomination: Twelver Shia
- Jurisprudence: Ja'fari

Muslim leader
- Based in: Najaf, Iraq
- Post: Grand Ayatullah
- Period in office: 1895–1911
- Predecessor: Mirza Shirazi
- Successor: Muhammad Hossein Naini

Ayatullah Sheikh Muhammad Kazim Khurasani (Persian: محمدکاظم خراسانی; 1839 – 12 December 1911), commonly known as Akhund Khurasani (Persian: آخوند خراسانی) was a Shia jurist and political activist.

He is known for using his position as a Marja as legitimizing force behind the first democratic revolution of Asia that happened in Iran (1905–1911), where he was the main clerical supporter of the revolution. He believed that the democratic form of government would be the best possible choice in the absence of Imam and regarded the democratic constitutional revolution a Jihad (holy war) in which all Muslims had to participate.

Along with Mirza Husayn Tehrani and Shaikh Abdallah Mazandarani, he led people against what they called a "state tyranny", issued fatwas, and "sent telegrams to tribal chiefs, prominent national and political leaders, and heads of state in England, France, Germany, and Turkey".

When Mohammad Ali Shah Qajar became king of Iran, Mohammad Kazim Khorasani sent him a 'ten-point' instruction including points on protecting Islam, promoting domestic industries and modern science, stopping colonial intervention in Iran 'while retaining diplomatic relations', and establishing 'justice and equality'.

He is regarded as one of the most important Shia Mujtahids of all times, and the title Akhund (the scholar) is almost exclusively used for him. He started to deliver his lectures at Najaf seminary in 1874 CE, when his mentor Syed Mirza Muhammad Hasan Shirazi left for Samarra and appointed him as his successor.

He became a source of emulation in 1895 and he taught for years in Najaf until his death in 1911 CE and trained a significant number of students from different regions of the Shi'ite world. All major Shia jurists in the twentieth century were in some way related to his circle. He was known for his credibility, independent thinking and intellectual rigor. His most famous work Kifayat al-Usul (Sufficiency of Principles (Arabic: کفایة الاصول)), published in 1903 established him as the supreme authority on Shia theology, where he presented the Shi'ite jurisprudential principles in a more rigorous fashion as a unified theory of jurisprudence. It was recently published for 453rd time.

This book is considered the pinnacle of advanced theology and foundation of Usul al-Fiqh in Shia seminaries of Najaf and Qom. All major Shia jurists following Akhund Khurasani have written commentaries on it, the best known is written by Ayatullah al-Khoei.

== Lifestyle and Education ==
Khurasani was born in Tus, a small town near Mashhad, in 1839 CE. His father, Mullah Hussain Heravi hailed from Herat, who was a cleric and a silk merchant. In 1850, he came to Mashhad to attend a Shi'ite seminary, Madrassa Ismail Khan. By 1856, he had completed the early education (sutuh) and got married.

At age 22, he left for Sabzevar, where he stayed for three months and got familiar with islamic philosophy under Molla Hadi Sabzavari. He wanted to go to Najaf but due to lack of funds, he delayed his departure and stayed in Tehran where he continued Islamic philosophy under Mulla Husayn Khoʾi at the Sadr seminary and completed his studies in Logic.

In 1862, he moved to Iraq and in Najaf followed the open lectures of the great Shi'ite jurist Ayatullah Shaykh Murtaza Ansari. Simultaneously he participated in open lectures of Ayatullah Mirza Hassan Shirazi, who later became famous for his campaign against the tobacco concession. He studied about two years under Murtaza Ansari.

After the death of Murtaza Ansari in 1864 CE, Mirza Hassan Shirazi became highest marja-e taqlid ("sources of emulation") of the Shi'ite world. Akhund Khurasani continued studying under him until his migration to Samarra in 1875 CE.

Like most seminary students, Khurasani lived a humble life, and he had to bear loss of loved ones. Because of lack of money, he could only fulfill immediate needs and was content with the basic amenities offered by the office of the Marja.

After marriage, he couldn't take his wife with him to Najaf and left her in Mashhad, due to lack of finances. He was informed of the death of his first child soon after arriving in Najaf. His wife joined him later but in 1864 CE, died after giving birth to the second child. It took years before Akhund decided to marry again in 1873 and had four children: Mirza Mahdi Khurasani (1875–1945), Mirza Muhammad (1877–1937), Mirza Ahmad Kifa’i Khurasani (1912–1971), and Zahra (1891–1956). His second wife died from a chronic illness, and Khurasani married for the last time in 1895 and fathered two sons: Hussain Aqa (1901–?) and Hassan Kifa’i (1902–1954).

As a Marja, Khurasani spent khums money on the neediest of the seminary students and funded the operation of the seminary. He supported public schools that were not necessarily fully religious. He also built three madrassahs in Najaf: in 1903, the Grand School of Akhund (Madrisih-yi Buzurg-i Akhund), in 1908, Akhund's Intermediate School (Madrisat al-Wusta al-Akhund) and in 1910, Akhund's Elementary School (Madrisih-yi Kuchak-i Akhund). He also supported local Persian societies, such as Anjuman-i Ukhuvvat-i Iranian, in Iraq and funded the building of several schools in Kazimayn in 1907, the 'Alawi in Najaf in 1908–1909, and the Husseini in Karbala (probably in 1909), established with the support of Anjuman-i Musawat-i Iranian. Akhund Khurasani would also lend his financial support to democratic societies and political organizations.

=== Students ===
He had many famous students who became famous Shi'i scholars. His students include:

- Muhammad Hussain Naini
- Ali Qazi Tabatabai
- Agha Zia ol Din Araghi
- Abu l-Hasan al-Isfahani
- Mohammad Hossein Gharavi Esfahani
- Asadullah Mamaghani

== Theological Influence and Opinions ==
After Mirza Shirazi moved to Samarra, he asked Khurasani to start giving open lectures in his place in Najaf. He had already granted him with permission to practice Ijtehad. His open lectures soon became popular among students. After Shirazi's death in 1894 CE, he emerged as the most important source of emulation of the Shi'ite world. In 1903 CE, he completed his most famous book, The Sufficiency (Arabic: کفایة الاصول), which is considered as cornerstone of Shi'ite philosophy of law. Under Khurasani's leadership, the Usuli position became the dominant view.

=== Books ===
Akhund Khurasani wrote the following books:

Books authored by Akhund Khurasani
Kifayat al-Usul	al-Fawaid al-Usuliyyah	Khurasani, Muhammad Kazim (30 July 1911). Dhakhīrat al-ʻibād fī yawm al-maʻād. hdl:2027/njp.32101077099818.	al-Hashiyah al-Qadimah	al-Hashiyah al-Mabsut
al-Hashiyah ‘ala al-Makasib	Takammulah al-Tabsirah	Khurasani, Muhammad Kazim (30 July 1912). "Qaṭarāt min yarāʻ baḥr al-ʻulūm, aw, Shadharāt min ʻiqdihā al-manẓūm". Maṭbaʻat al-Wilāyah. hdl:2027/njp.32101077795852.	Tahrirat fi al-Usul	
Rasa’il al-‘Amaliyyah	Hashiyyat al-Fara’id al-Qadimah	Hashiyyah ‘Ala Asfar	Khurasani, Muhammad Kazim (30 July 1910). "Hādhā kitāb Takmilat al-tabṣirah fī al-fiqh". Handle System. 880-02Takmilat al-tabṣirah fī al-fiqh. hdl:2027/njp.32101077795860.	Hashiyyah ‘Ala Manzuma al-Sabzivari
Sharh Li Awail al-Khutabat al-Auwla	Risalah fi Mas’ilah al-Ijarah	Hashiyya ‘Ala Abanat al-Mukhtar	Hashiyyah ‘Ala al-‘Anab al-Iinnah	

=== Definition of Ijtihad ===
Akhund Khurasani says that Ijtihad is a process in which jurist "exerts his full capacity in order to arrive at an opinion based on a legitimate legal judgement." According to Akhund, a jurist is obliged to take whatever time he needs to read and research into a matter before giving a reasonable judgement. He says that if his effort produces no result, the jurist must not give his opinion. In such a case, the jurist should obtain further knowledge. Followers are free to decide whom to emulate, and the most important traits of the Source of Emulation (Marja) are his openness towards contemporary issues and willingness to explore traditional and non-traditional knowledge to address needs of the community.

=== Ijtihad must be time-sensitive ===
As science and technology progress, social circumstances and lifestyle also change. Language evolves and new concepts emerge. Akhund Khurasani believed that jurisprudential judgement must be time-sensitive. Also, the jurist should be willing to change his opinions based on the needs of the ever changing society. However, he should not interfere in all aspects of people's life, beyond religious affairs. As for the social issues, he favored those reformers who were ready to think outside the box and consider scholarly inputs from other parts of the world. However, his version of secularism was different from western modernists, it was based on the Shia doctrine of occultation of the twelfth imam.

=== Jurist as a social activist ===
Like his mentor Ayatullah Murtaza Ansari, Akhund believed that a jurist was not different from ordinary people in the matters of politics, as Shia school of thought did not allow for special political status of jurists. Rather, he believed that scholars could act as "warning voices in society" and criticize the officials who were not doing their responsibilities correctly. He compared the role of scholars with "salt of the earth" in the sense that they prevent "decay of power", should fight against injustice and that they are against "autocratic attitudes". A Marja should act as a social activist, using his rational approach to guide the masses while preserving the pillars of Shia doctrine.

=== The idea of nation-state ===
A nation-state is a political unit where the state and nation are congruent. The idea of nation state emerged in west slowly after treaty of Westphalia, as new technology like printing press, invention of engine and other phenomenon changed the societies. When new technologies entered the Muslim world, Akhund Khurasani as a pragmatic jurist supported the idea of nation-state as unity of people and government (Persian: اتحاد دولت و ملت). Long before the revolution started, in 1902 he penned a letter to the crown prince of Iran, Muhammad Ali Mirza, in which he argued that the wave of reform that had spread across the western world and resulted in better governance and improved socio-economic conditions, could help treat ills of Iran. He believed the powers of monarch, like British monarchy, need to be limited and the limits be defined by a constitution written by democratic parliament. He agreed to the position of King as a symbol of Iran's history. However, he opposed absolute powers of the King and deemed it responsible for ineffective management and foreign influence.

=== Secular democracy during Occultation ===
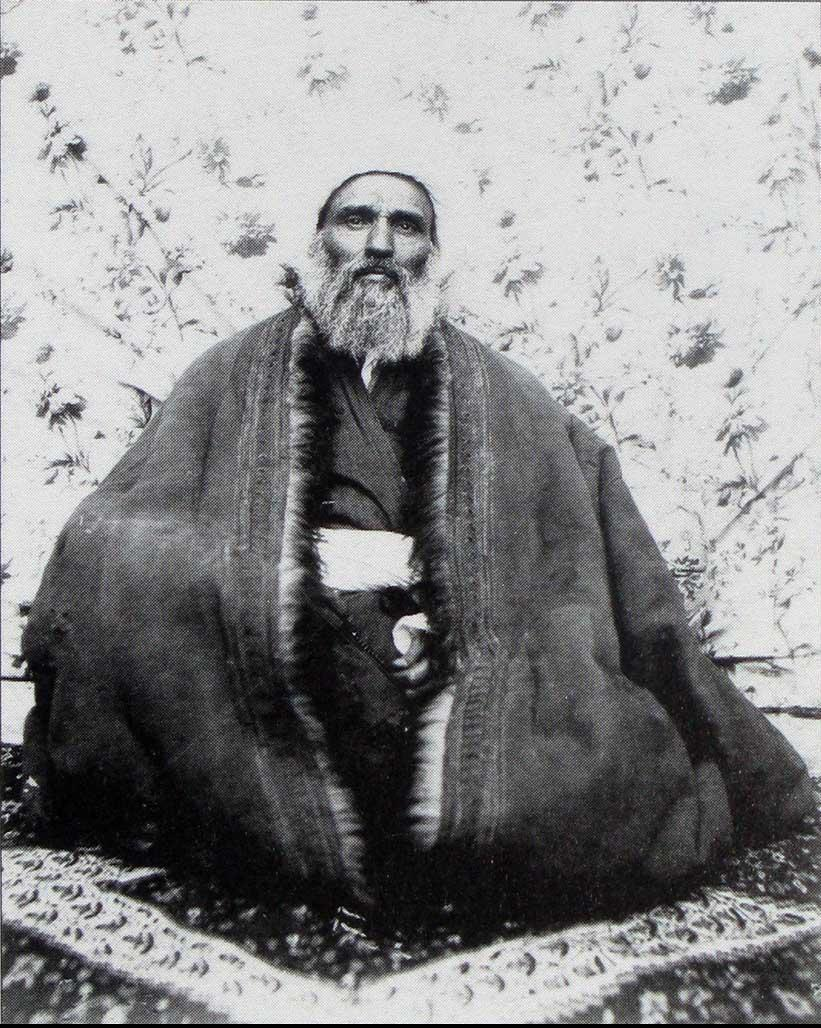
Akhund Khurasani is known to be the greatest theorist of Usuli Shi'ism in modern times.

Occultation of Imam in Shia Islam refers to a belief that Mahdi, a cultivated male descendant of the Islamic Prophet Muhammad, has already been born and subsequently went into occultation, from which he will one day emerge with Jesus and establish global justice. Akhund Khurasani and his colleagues theorized a model of religious secularity in the absence of Imam, that still prevails in Shia seminaries. In absence of the ideal ruler, that is Imam al-Mahdi, democracy was the best available option. He considers opposition to constitutional democracy as hostility towards the twelfth Imam. He declared his full support for constitutional democracy and announced that objection to "foundations of constitutionalism" was un-Islamic. According to Akhund, "a rightful religion imposes conditions on the actions and behavior of human beings", which stem from either holy text or logical reasoning, and these constraints are essentially meant to prevent despotism. He believes that an Islamic system of governance can not be established without the infallible Imam leading it. Thus the clergy and modern scholars have concluded that a proper legislation can help reduce the state tyranny and maintain peace and security. He said:

Persian: سلطنت مشروعه آن است کہ متصدی امور عامه ی ناس و رتق و فتق کارهای قاطبه ی مسلمین و فیصل کافه ی مهام به دست شخص معصوم و موید و منصوب و منصوص و مأمور مِن الله باشد مانند انبیاء و اولیاء و مثل خلافت امیرالمومنین و ایام ظهور و رجعت حضرت حجت، و اگر حاکم مطلق معصوم نباشد، آن سلطنت غیرمشروعه است، چنان‌ کہ در زمان غیبت است و سلطنت غیرمشروعه دو قسم است، عادله، نظیر مشروطه کہ مباشر امور عامه، عقلا و متدینین باشند و ظالمه و جابره است، مثل آنکه حاکم مطلق یک نفر مطلق‌ العنان خودسر باشد. البته به صریح حکم عقل و به فصیح منصوصات شرع «غیر مشروعه ی عادله» مقدم است بر «غیرمشروعه ی جابره». و به تجربه و تدقیقات صحیحه و غور رسی‌ های شافیه مبرهن شده که نُه عشر تعدیات دوره ی استبداد در دوره ی مشروطیت کمتر می‌شود و دفع افسد و اقبح به فاسد و به قبیح واجب است.

English: "According to Shia doctrine, only the infallible Imam has the right to govern, to run the affairs of the people, to solve the problems of the Muslim society and to make important decisions. As it was in the time of the prophets or in the time of the caliphate of the commander of the faithful, and as it will be in the time of the reappearance and return of the Mahdi. If the absolute guardianship is not with the infallible then it will be a non-islamic government. Since this is a time of occultation, there can be two types of non-islamic regimes: the first is a just democracy in which the affairs of the people are in the hands of faithful and educated men, and the second is a government of tyranny in which a dictator has absolute powers. Therefore, both in the eyes of the Sharia and reason what is just prevails over the unjust. From human experience and careful reflection it has become clear that democracy reduces the tyranny of state and it is obligatory to give precedence to the lesser evil."

— Muhammad Kazim Khurasani

As "sanctioned by sacred law and religion", Akhund believes, a theocratic government can only be formed by the infallible Imam. Aqa Buzurg Tehrani also quoted Akhund Khurasani saying that if there was a possibility of establishment of a truly legitimate Islamic rule in any age, God must end occultation of the Imam of Age. Hence, he refuted the idea of absolute guardianship of jurist. Therefore, according to Akhund, Shia jurists must support the democratic reform. He prefers collective wisdom (Persian: عقل جمعی) over individual opinions, and limits the role of jurist to provide religious guidance in personal affairs of a believer. He defines democracy as a system of governance that enforces a set of "limitations and conditions" on the head of state and government employees so that they work within "boundaries that the laws and religion of every nation determines". Akhund believes that modern secular laws complement traditional religion. He asserts that both religious rulings and the laws outside the scope of religion confront "state despotism". Constitutionalism is based on the idea of defending the "nation's inherent and natural liberties", and as absolute power corrupts, a democratic distribution of power would make it possible for the nation to live up to its full potential.

=== Democracy protects religion ===
Akhund believes that democracy provides necessary safeguards for faith to prevail. As it depends on the will of the people and treats all citizens equally, it would respect the religion of the people. A similar argument appears in Ayatullah Sistani's political thought in post-Saddam Iraq. Commenting on the conspiracy theories that Islam was in danger and democracy was intended to make the masses faithless, Akhund Khurasani said that people should benefit from the freedom to organize and create religious societies to preach and make sure that the laws passed by their representatives are based on Ja'fari jurisprudence.

=== Democracy should include minority voices ===
Many scholars believe that protection of minority rights is an essential element that distinguishes democracy from majoritarianism and prevents fascist persecution of minorities. During the democratic revolution, those who supported dictatorship against democracy, started to portray democracy as a conspiracy of non-Muslim minorities. This resulted in violent attacks against them from thugs, backed by the imperial court's clerical employee Shaykh Fazlullah Nuri. Akhund Khurasani issued a fatwa that made it obligatory for Muslims to protect the rights of non-Muslims. He said:

Persian:

بسم الله الرحمان الرحیم. ایذاء و تحقیر طایفه ی زردشتیه و سایر اهل ذمه که در حمایت اسلام اند حرام، و بر تمام مسلمین واجب است که وصایای حضرت خاتم النبیین صلی الله علیه و آله الطاهرین را در حسن سلوک و تالیف قلوب و حفظ نفوس و اعراض اموال ایشان کما ینبغی رعایت نمایند و سر مویی تخلف نکنند. ان شاء اللّہ تعالیٰ

من الاحقر محمد کاظم خراسانی

"In the name of Allah,

terrorizing or insulting the Zoroastrians or other non-Muslims living in peace is forbidden. Muslims are obliged to be kind and generous towards them and protect their lives and properties, as advised by the last prophet, Muhammad (PBUH), by the grace of God."

— Muhammad Kazim Khurasani

Akhund Khurasani is praised by Iran's Zoroastrians for his positive role in protecting their rights during the constitutional movement. His legacy was carried on by major Shia jurists that followed. Ayatullah Khoei showed great flexibility and tolerance, for example he considered non-Muslims as equal citizens of the nation-state, stopped the harsh punishments like stoning and favored the use of holy books other than Quran for oaths taken from non-Muslims. In modern Iraq, Ayatullah Sistani has also associated legitimacy of democratic process with inclusion of minority voices. Sistani helped Sunni, Christian, and Yazidi displaced families during the ISIS takeover of Iraq's cities. Ayatullah Fayyad said that the source of emulation has a role to play in equality and unity among Iraq's citizen irrespective of their religion.

=== Economic independence ===
Akhund Khurasani believed that economic dependency on colonial powers is one of the major hurdles in achieving maximum liberty. In 1898, a rich trader from Isfahan, Hajj Kaziruni, established a textile company, shirkat-i-islami, and requested Akhund Khurasani for support. He issued a decree stopping his followers from buying British cloth in an attempt to protect the interests of Iranian traders in tough competition. A similar economic boycott was also practiced by indians and other anti-colonial movements of the 20th century as a means of resistance against economic exploitation. Akhund Khurasani supported the idea of establishment of a national bank to facilitate trade, and he kept reminding his followers about the need for economic reforms. He said:

Persian: حکم به وجوب کفایی تعلیم مشق نظامی و تاٴسیس مکاتب و احداث بانک ملی بر وجهی که در ورقه علیٰحده نوشته شدہ و شرح دادہ صحیح و از این خدام شریعت مطهرہ صادر است. حررّہ الاحقر الجانی محمّد کاظم الخراسانی

"The ruling that the learning of modern military skills, establishment of public education school system and creation of a national bank are collective obligation, is issued by me, the humble servant of the religious law, as written and explained in the separate paper."

— Muhammad Kazim Khurasani

=== Views on modern knowledge ===
Akhund believed that it was obligatory for believers to attain necessary level of education and skill to be able to protect national and religious interests. He saw democracy as a means to efficient governance that would bring prosperity and prevent colonial influence. He kept pressing for the need for modern schools to provide education to all children, modern economics, establishment of a national bank and industrialization. He believed that modernity would prevent savagery. After describing the need for modern reforms, he said:

Persian: متمرد از آن یا جاهل و احمق است یا معاند دین حنیف اسلام.

"Those who do not accept this fact are either ignorant subordinates or adversaries of the noble Muslim religion."

— Muhammad Kazim Khurasani

He emphasized on the need for establishment of nation-wide school system that would teach modern sciences and operate according to Islamic ethics.

=== Military and defense ===
Modernization of the military was of the utmost importance to him, so that the nation-state built in Iran after revolution could defend itself against adversaries. A similar argument can be found in Ayatullah Sistani's stress on state monopoly over violence.

== Political activism ==
The city of Najaf has played the role of nerve center in Shia world through centuries. At the dawn of constitutional revolution, it was here that the political ideas were discussed and the religious secularity of Shia jurisprudence took shape. Many periodicals of the time, especially al-Ghura, Durat al-Najaf, and Najaf, published from the city, reflect the nature of the intellectual exchange during the movement. Other publications, such as the Calcutta-based Habl al-Matin also reached the residents of Najaf.

Najaf had developed its own taste of modernity, distinct from west. These publications advocated the concepts of personal liberty, nation-state, modern sciences, constitutional monarchy and democracy. But they also viewed western colonial advance as intimidating and understood that the only way to fight back was creating a strong and progressive nation.

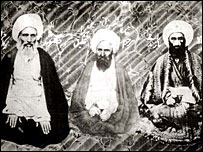
The trio: (left to right) Akhund Khurasani, Mirza Husayn Tehrani and Abdullah Mazandarani

Akhund Khurasani saw his role as an activist scholar who would interpret the religion according to the needs of the time to persuade the masses to constructive action. He was the main legitimizing force behind modern reforms. He did not shy away from analyzing what the western scholarship had to offer and incorporate it into his doctrine. However, he had his own theoretical foundations for those reforms and his own terminology, based in Shi'i doctrine. He understood how mismanagement, nepotism and corruption had engulfed Iran's economy. He supported a powerless monarch as a symbol of Iran's history but he was also confident in the legacy that he carried of clerical tradition as the guide. Therefore, he was in a position to offer scholarly criticism and evaluation of governance and social conditions. He protected the parliament by issuing clarifications and religious rulings, when it needed his support against the fanatic anti-constitutionalists. Not only that, he gave instructions to different orators and organized clerics of different ranks to stand behind the cause.

=== The call to political reform ===
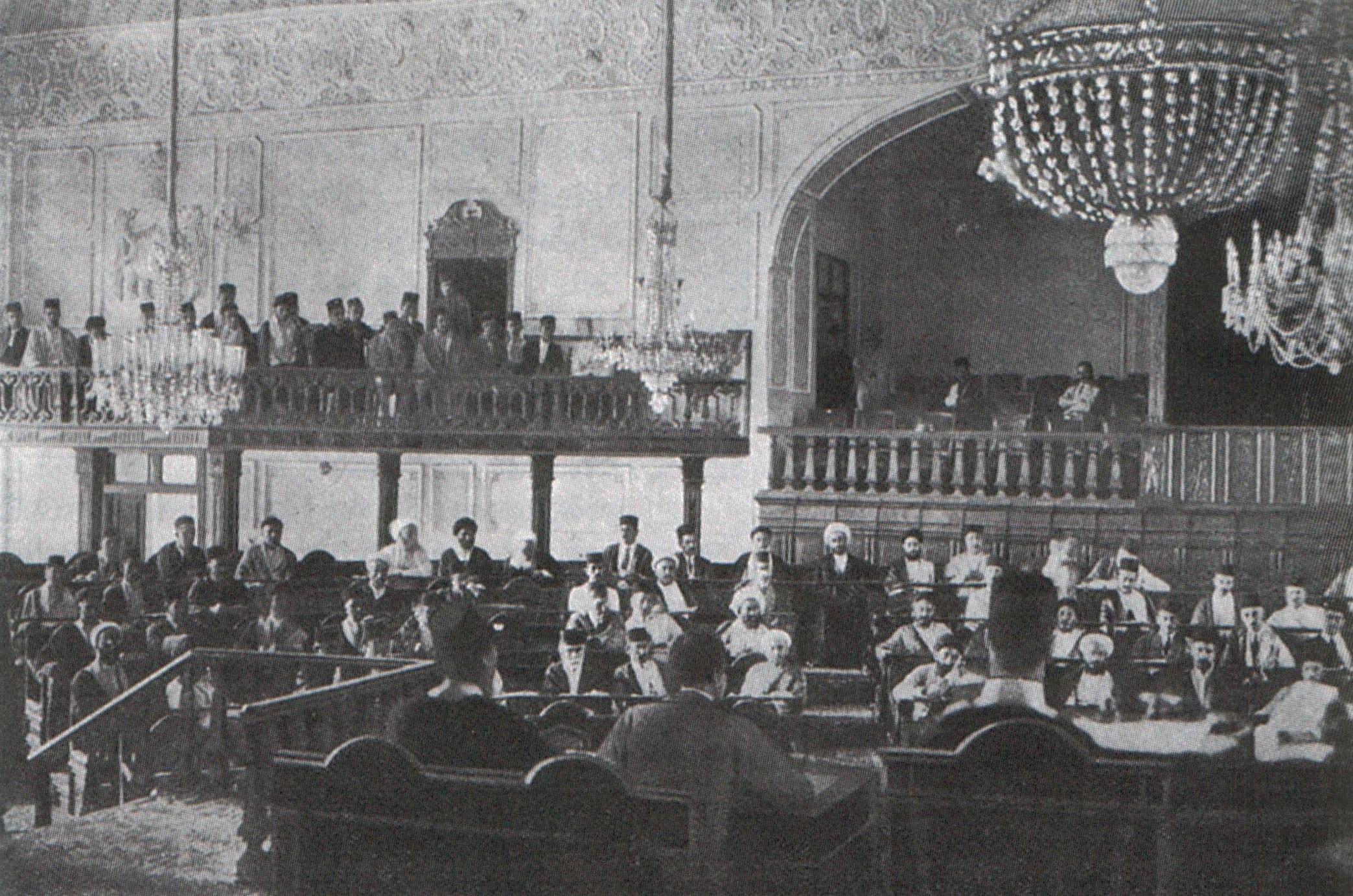
1906: the first parliament in Tehran.

In a letter dated 7 August 1902, Akhund Khurasani and the other two Marja's as co-signatories, wrote to the Crown Prince Muhammad Ali Mirza stressing the need for joining the world community in anticipating modern social reform and uprooting corruption. Referring to the Prince's visit to the west, he said that the old monarchical system of government was going to collapse all over the world and reform was need of the hour. The monarchy could only survive if its powers were limited by constitution.

He stressed the idea of unification of nation and state, and as a rational Usuli jurist, he was able to think out of the box and understand how other nations had progressed as a result of democratic reforms. In the same letter, he presented the idea of nation-state, i.e. unity of the people and government (Persian: اتحاد دولت و ملت). In a letter dated 27 July 1903, he inquired about King's mismanagement of financial sources and lack of funds for financial reforms and military. He also questioned the slow pace of building of the dam in Ahwaz.

=== The constitutional revolution ===
The fourth Qajar King, Naser al-Din Shah was assassinated by Mirza Reza Kermani, a follower of Jamāl al-Dīn al-Afghānī, when he was visiting and praying in the Shah Abdul-Azim Shrine on 1 May 1896. At Mozaffar al-Din Shah's accession Persia faced a financial crisis, with annual governmental expenditures far in excess of revenues as a result of the policies of his father. During his reign, Mozzafar ad-Din attempted some reforms of the central treasury; however, the previous debt incurred by the Qajar court, owed to both England and Russia, significantly undermined this effort. He awarded William Knox D'Arcy, a British subject, the rights to oil in most of the country in 1901. Widespread fears amongst the aristocracy, educated elites, and religious leaders about the concessions and foreign control resulted in some protests in 1906. The three main groups of the coalition seeking a constitution were the merchants, the ulama, and a small group of radical reformers. They shared the goal of ending royal corruption and ending dominance by foreign powers. These resulted in the Shah accepting a suggestion to create a Majles (National Consultative Assembly) in October 1906, by which the monarch's power was curtailed as he granted a constitution and parliament to the people. King Mozaffar ad-Din Shah signed the 1906 constitution shortly before his death. The members of newly formed parliament stayed constantly in touch with Akhund Khurasani and whenever legislative bills were discussed, he was telegraphed the details for a juristic opinion. In a letter dated 3 June 1907, the parliament told Akhund about a group of anti-constitutionalists who were trying to undermine legitimacy of democracy in the name of religious law. The trio replied:

Persian:

اساس این مجلس محترم مقدس بر امور مذکور مبتنی است. بر هر مسلمی سعی و اهتمام در استحکام و تشیید این اساس قویم لازم، و اقدام در موجبات اختلال آن محاده و معانده با صاحب شریعت مطهره علی الصادع بها و آله الطاهرین افضل الصلاه و السلام، و خیانت به دولت قوی شوکت است. الاحقر نجل المرحوم الحاج میرزا خلیل قدس سره محمد حسین،

حررّہ الاحقر الجانی محمد کاظم الخراسانی، من الاحقر عبدالله المازندرانی

"Because we are aware of the intended reasons for this institution, it is therefore incumbent on every Muslim to support its foundation, and those who try to defeat it, and their action against it, are considered contrary to shari‘a."

— Mirza Husayn Tehrani, Muhammad Kazim Khurasani, Abdallah Mazandaran.

=== The Nuri affair ===
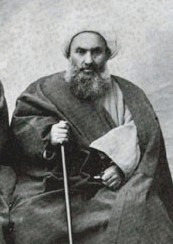
Sheikh Fazlollah Noori (d. 1909), a cleric who supported the coup d'état of Mohammad Ali Shah Qajar in 1908. He was hanged by the constitutional revolutionaries on 31 July 1909 (in Toopkhaneh) as a traitor.

Meanwhile, the new Shah had understood that he could not roll back the constitutional democracy by royalist ideology, and therefore he decided to use the religion card. The parliament came under attack from imperial court's cleric, Shaykh Fazlullah Nuri and other anti-democracy clerics. Nuri was a rich and high-ranking Qajar court official responsible for conducting marriages and contracts. He also handled wills of wealthy men and collected religious funds. Nuri was opposed to the very foundations of the institution of parliament. He led a large group of followers and began a round-the-clock sit-in in the Shah Abdol-Azim Shrine on 21 June 1907 which lasted till 16 September 1907. He generalized the idea of religion as a complete code of social life to push for his own agenda. He believed democracy will allow for "teaching of chemistry, physics and foreign languages", that would result in spread of Atheism. He bought a printing press and launched a newspaper of his own for propaganda purposes, Ruznamih-i-Shaikh Fazlullah, and published leaflets. He believed that the ruler was accountable to no institution other than God and people have no right to limit the powers or question the conduct of the King. He declared that those who supported democratic form of government were faithless and corrupt, and apostates. He hated the idea of female education and said that girls schools were brothels. Alongside his vicious propaganda against women education, he also opposed allocation of funds for modern industry, modern ways of governance, equal rights for all citizens irrespective of their religion and freedom of press. He believed that people were cattle, but paradoxically, he wanted to "awaken the muslim brethren".

The anti-democracy clerics incited violence and one such cleric said that getting in the proximity of the parliament was a bigger sin than adultery, robbery and murder. In Zanjan, Mulla Qurban Ali Zanjani mobilized a force of six hundred thugs who looted shops of pro-democracy merchants and took hold of the city for several days and killed the representative Sa'd al-Saltanih.

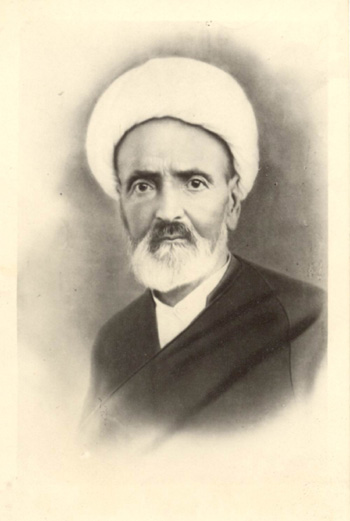
Shaykh Ibrahim Zanjani was head of the tribunal who sentenced Fazlullah Nouri to death.

Nuri himself recruited mercenaries from criminal gangs to harass the supporters of democracy. On 22 December 1907, Nuri led a mob towards Tupkhanih Square and attacked merchants and looted stores. Nuri's ties to the court of monarchy and landlords reinforced his fanaticism. He even contacted the Russian embassy for support and his men delivered sermons against democracy in mosques, resulting in chaos. Akhund Khurasani was consulted on the matter and in a letter dated 30 December 1907, the three Marja's said:

Persian:

چون نوری مخل آسائش و مفسد است، تصرفش در امور حرام است.

محمد حسین (نجل) میرزا خلیل، محمد کاظم خراسانی، عبدالله مازندرانی

"Because Nuri is causing trouble and sedition, his interfering in any affair is forbidden."

— Mirza Husayn Tehrani, Muhammad Kazim Khurasani, Abdallah Mazandaran.

However, Nuri continued his activities and a few weeks later Akhund Khurasani and his fellow Marja's argued for his expulsion from Tehran:

Persian:

رفع اغتشاشات حادثه و تبعید نوری را عاجلاً اعلام.

الداعی محمد حسین نجل المرحوم میرزا خلیل، الداعی محمد کاظم الخراسانی، عبدالله المازندرانی

"Restore peace and expel Nuri as quickly as possible."

— Mirza Husayn Tehrani, Muhammad Kazim Khurasani, Abdallah Mazandaran.

One major concern of Akhund Khurasani and other Marja's was to familiarize the public with the ideas of a democratic nation-state and modern constitution. Akhund Khurasani asked Iranian scholars to deliver sermons on the subject to clarify doubts seeded by Nuri and his comrades. Hajj Shaikh Muhammad Va'iz Isfahani, a skillful orator of Tehran, made concerted efforts to educate the masses. Another scholar, Sayyid Jamal al-Din Va'iz continuously refuted Nuri's propaganda and said that religious tyranny was worse than the temporal tyranny as the harm that the corrupt clerics inflict upon Islam and Muslims is worse. He advised the Shia masses to not pay attention to everyone with a turban on his head, rather they should listen to the guidelines of the sources of emulation in Najaf. Mirza Ali Aqa Tabrizi, the enlightened Seghatoleslam from Tabriz, wrote a treatise Lalan(Persian: لالان). He opposed Nuri saying that only the opinion of the sources of emulation is worthy of consideration in the matters of faith. He wrote:

He who wins his own soul, protects his religion, is against following his desires and is obedient to the command of his Master; that is the person whom the people should take as their model.

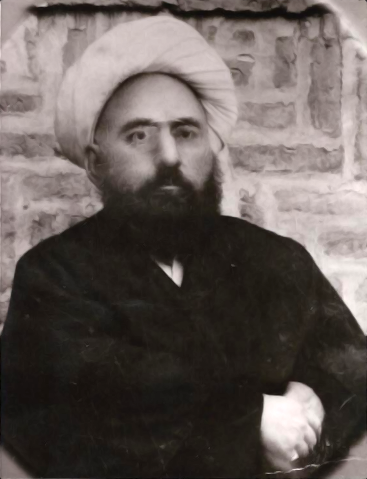
Seghatoleslam Tabrizi(Persian: ثقة الاسلام میرزا علی آقا تبریزی; January 19, 1861 – December 31, 1911)

And

Let us consider the idea that the constitution is against Sharia law: all oppositions of this kind are in vain because the hujjaj al-islam of the atabat, who are today the models (marja') and the refuge (malija) of all Shiites, have issued clear fatwas that uphold the necessity of the Constitution. Aside from their words, they have also shown this by their actions. They see in Constitution the support for splendour of Islam.

He firmly opposed the idea of a supervisory committee of Tehran's clerics censoring the conduct of the parliament, and said that:

this delicate subject shall be submitted to the atabat, . . . we don't have the right to entrust government to a group of four or five mullahs from Tehran.

As far as Nuri's argument was concerned, Akhund Khurasani refuted it in a light tone by saying that he supported the "parliament at Baharistan Square", questioning the legitimacy of Nuri's assembly at Shah Abdul Azim shrine and their right to decide for the people. Responding to a question about Nouri's arguments, Akhund Muhammad Kazim Khurasani said:

Persian: اگر حاکم مطلق معصوم نباشد، آن سلطنت غیرمشروعه است، چنان‌ کہ در زمان غیبت است و سلطنت غیرمشروعه دو قسم است، عادله، نظیر مشروطه کہ مباشر امور عامه، عقلا و متدینین باشند و ظالمه و جابره است، مثل آنکه حاکم مطلق یک نفر مطلق‌ العنان خودسر باشد. البته به صریح حکم عقل و به فصیح منصوصات شرع «غیر مشروعه ی عادله» مقدم است بر «غیرمشروعه ی جابره» .

English: "If the absolute guardianship is not with the infallible then it will be a non-islamic government. Since this is a time of occultation, there can be two types of non-islamic regimes: the first is a just democracy in which the affairs of the people are in the hands of faithful and educated men, and the second is a government of tyranny in which a dictator has absolute powers. Therefore, both in the eyes of the Sharia and reason what is just prevails over the unjust."

— Muhammad Kazim Khurasani

Akhund made it clear that a truly islamic government can only be formed by the infallible Imam, anyone claiming otherwise is mislead.

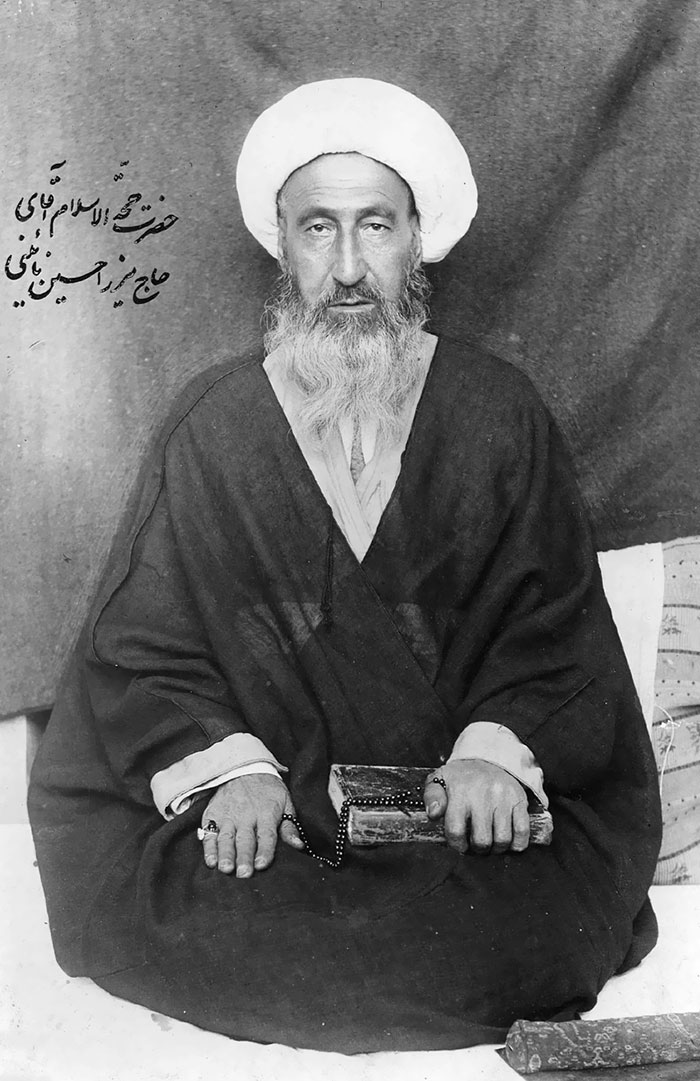
Muhammad Hussain Na'ini(Persian: محمد حسين نائينى; 25 May 1860 – 14 August 1936)

His close associate and student, who later rose to the rank of Marja, Muhammad Hussain Naini, wrote a book, Tanbih al-Ummah wa Tanzih al-Milla(Persian: تنبیه‌ الامه و تنزیه‌ المله), to counter the propaganda of Nuri group. He devoted many pages to distinguish between tyrannical and democratic regimes. In democracies, power is distributed and limited through constitution. He maintained that in the absence of Imam Mahdi, all governments are doomed to be imperfect and unjust, and therefore people had to prefer the bad over the worse. Hence, the constitutional democracy was the best option to help improve the condition of the society as compared to absolutism, and run the worldly affairs with consultation and better planning. he saw the elected members of the parliament as representatives of the people, not deputies of the Imam, hence they did not need a religious justification for their authority. He said that both the "tyrannical Ulema" and the radical societies who promoted majoritarianism were a threat to both Islam and democracy. The people should avoid the destructive, corrupt and divisive forces and maintain national unity. He devoted large section of his book to definition and condemnation of religious tyranny. He then went on to defend people's freedom of opinion and expression, equality of all citizens in eyes of the nation-state regardless of their religion, separation of the legislative, executive and judicial powers, accountability of the King, people's right to share power. Another student of Akhund who too raised to the rank of Marja, Shaykh Isma'il Mahallati, wrote a treatise al-Liali al-Marbuta fi Wajub al-Mashruta(Persian: اللئالی المربوطه‌ فی وجوب المشروطه‌). In his view, during the occultation of the twelfth Imam, the governments can either be imperfectly just or oppressive. Since it was duty of a believer to actively fight injustice, it was necessary to strengthen democratic process. he insisted on the need for reforming the economic system, modernizing the military, installing a functional education system, and guaranteeing the rights of civilians. He said:

‘constitutional’ and ‘oppressive’ are both only adjectives that describe different governments. If the sovereign appropriates all power to himself, for his own personal benefit, then the government is a tyrannical one; if, on the other hand, the sovereign's power is limited by the people, then the government is constitutional. This distinction has nothing to do with religion. Whatever the religion of the inhabitants of a nation, whether they be monotheistic or polytheistic, Muslims or unbelievers, their government could be either constitutional or tyrannical.

Nuri interpreted Sharia in a self-serving and shallow way, unlike Akhund Khurasani who, as a well received source of emulation, viewed the adherence to religion in a society beyond one person or one interpretation. While Nuri confused Sharia with written constitution of a modern society, Akhund Khurasani understood the difference and the function of the two. Nuri founded his arguments on myths and reached illogical conclusion. He had a narrow understanding of modernity and had no alternative to offer. He perceived the new social contract as a threat to his own prestige and lavish lifestyle.

=== Minor Tyranny ===
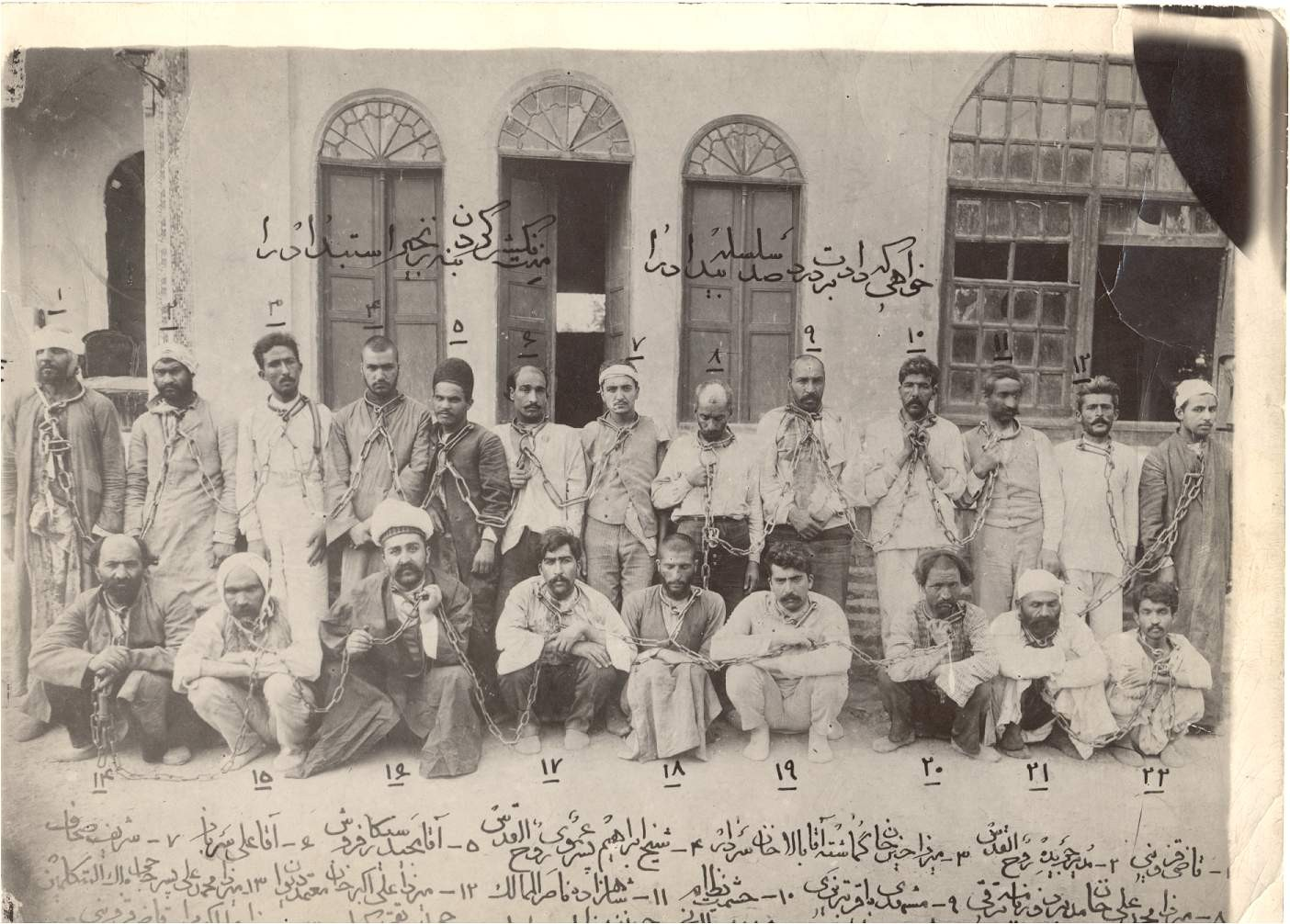
Some mistreated and shackled pro-democracy prisoners held in Bagh-e Shah, Tehran, following the successful coup d'état of Mohammad-Ali Shah Qajar in June 1908.

The sixth Qajar King Mohammad Ali Shah Qajar abolished the constitution and bombarded the parliament in 1908 with Russian and British support. After the Shah's victory and dissolvement of the parliament, many constitutionalists were arrested by the Shah's forces. Mirza Jahangir Khan, Malek al-Mutakallemin, Sayyid Jamal al-Din Va'iz, Mirza Ebrahim Tabrizi, Ahmad Ruhul-qudus and Qazi Ardaqi were arrested, tortured and killed.

The period from the destruction of the first parliament under the orders of Mohammad Ali Shah Qajar on June 23, 1908, to the Shah's deposition on July 16, 1909, is called as the period of "Lesser Despotism" or "Minor Tyranny" (Persian: استبداد صغیر) in the history of modern Iran. The shah repeatedly delayed the elections under the guise of fighting sedition and defending Islam. Mohammad Ali Shah Qajar wrote letters to the sources of emulation in Najaf, seeking their support against the perceived conspiracies of Babis and other heretics. However the trio, Akhund Khurasani, Mirza Tehrani and Abdullah Mazandarani responded by affirming the religious legitimacy of democracy and advised the shah to work within the constitutional framework in improving the conditions of society and defending the country against colonial influence. Nuri, on the other hand, sided with the coup and tried to convince people that democracy had failed and that closure of parliament was necessary to save Islam.

=== Call for restoration of democracy ===
Akhund Khurasani responded to Muhammad Ali Shah's coup by calling his rule a "bloody tyranny" and asking people to stop paying taxes and fight the tyrant. In a statement, co-signed by the other two jurists, he said:

Persian:

به عموم ملت ایران، حکم خدا را اعلام می داریم، الیوم همت در دفع این سفاک جبار، و دفاع از نفوس و اعراض و اموال مسلمین از اهم واجبات، و دادن مالیات به گماشتگان او از اعظم محرمات، و بذل جهد و سعی بر استقرار مشروطیت به منزله جہاد در رکاب امام زمان ارواحنا فداه، و سر موئی مخالفت و مسامحه به منزله خذلان و محاربه با آن حضرت صلوات الله و سلامه علیه است. اعاذ الله المسلمین من ذلک. ان شا الله تعالیٰ

الاحقر عبدالله المازندرانی، الاحقر محمد کاظم الخراسانی، الاحقر نجل الحاج میرزا خلیل

"The religious duty of the Iranian nation is as follows: today efforts to dethrone this tyrant despot and protecting the lives, belongings and honor of Muslims is the greatest obligation. Paying taxes to his officers is a great sin. Working for restoration of democracy is as good as fighting for the cause of Imam al-Mahdi, and opposing constitutionalism is equal to leaving his camp. May God help us all."

— Mirza Husayn Tehrani, Muhammad Kazim Khurasani, Abdallah Mazandaran.

The Shah was ousted on July 16, 1909 and democracy was restored.

== Death ==
He died of a stroke, when he aimed to leave Iraq for Iran in order to support constitutionalists' resistance to the Anglo-Russian invasion in 1911.

== Legacy ==
He authored many books hence called "the Renewer" (al-mujaddid) of Usul al-fiqh. Kifayat al-usul, Khorasani's most important book, is taught in advanced classes at the shia seminaries as the main text on the philosophy of religious law. It has received "hundreds of commentaries". The book suppressed Qvanin al-Osul by Qummi, one of seminary main texts taught at higher level. Also, he wrote one of the most important commentaries on Shaykh Morteza al-Ansari's Durar al-fawaid fi sharh al-Faraid, also taught alongside Kifayat al-usul.

Among his prominent students were Ayatullah Mirza Hussein Naini, Ayatullah Muhammad Hossein Qaravi, Aqa Zia ud-Din Araqi, Shaikh Abdul Karim Ha'iri, Aqa Najafi Quchani, Sayyid Husayn Burujurdi, Sayyid Muhsin al-Hakim, Aqa Buzurg Tehrani, Ayatullah Ismail Mahallati, Sayyid Muhammad-Taqi Fakhr-i Da'i Gilani, Ayatullah Mohsin Alaa al Mohadithien, Mirza Abdul-Hassan Mishkini, Shaykh Muhammad Hussayn Kashif al-Ghita’, Shaykh Muhammad Jawad Ballaghi, Aqa Shaykh Muhammad Ali Shahabadi, Sayyid Muhsin Amin ‘Amili, Aqa Sayyid Abdul-Hassan Isfahani, Ayatullah Hussayn Qumi, Sayyid Muhammad Taqi Khunsari, and the famous Sayyid Hassan Mudarris.

== See also ==
- Mirza Husayn Tehrani
- Abdullah Mazandarani
- Muhammad Hossein Naini
- Mirza Ali Aqa Tabrizi
- Mirza Sayyed Mohammad Tabatabai
- Seyyed Abdollah Behbahani
- Iranian Constitutional Revolution
- Intellectual movements in Iran
- Mirza Malkom Khan
- Kifayat al-Usul

== Bibliography ==
- AḴŪND ḴORĀSĀNĪ, Encyclopædia Iranica
- Farzaneh, Mateo Mohammad (March 2015). Iranian Constitutional Revolution and the Clerical Leadership of Khurasani. Syracuse, NY: Syracuse University Press. ISBN 978-0-8156-3388-4. OCLC 931494838.
- Mangol, Bayat (1991). Iran's First Revolution: Shi'ism and the Constitutional Revolution of 1905-1909. Oxford, New York: Oxford University Press. ISBN 978-0-19-506822-1.
- Hermann, Denis (1 May 2013). "Akhund Khurasani and the Iranian Constitutional Movement". Middle Eastern Studies. 49 (3): 430–453. doi:10.1080/00263206.2013.783828. ISSN 0026-3206. JSTOR 23471080. S2CID 143672216.
- Nouraie, Fereshte M. (1975). "The Constitutional Ideas of a Shi'ite Mujtahid: Muhammad Husayn Na'ini". Iranian Studies. 8 (4): 234–247. doi:10.1080/00210867508701501. ISSN 0021-0862. JSTOR 4310208.
- Sayej, Caroleen Marji (2018). Patriotic Ayatollahs: Nationalism in Post-Saddam Iraq. Ithaca, NY: Cornell University Press. p. 67. doi:10.7591/cornell/9781501715211.001.0001. ISBN 978-1-5017-1485-6.
- Kadivar, محسن کدیور (2008). سیاست نامه خراسانی (in Persian). تہران: انتشارات کویر.
- Tabbaa, Yasser (2014). Najaf, the Gate of wisdom. UNESCO Office for Iraq. p. 201.
