= Mirza Muhammad Aghazadeh Khorasani =

Mirza Mohammad Aghazadeh Khorasani (Persian:میرزا محمد آقازاده خراسانی) was a jurist, politician and shia authority. He was one of the sons of Ayatollah Mohammad-Kazem Khorasani.

== Biography ==
He was the second son of Ayatollah Muhammad Kazim Khorasani known as Mohammad-Kazem Khorasani. He was born in Najaf in 1294 Higra Lunar.

== Political activity ==
Akhund Khorasani commanded him to immigrate to Mashhad and appointed as the chief of the scientific seminary of the Mashhad. He participated in Persian Constitutional Revolution along with his father. he had disagreed with Reza Shah Pahlavi's government. Also he participated in uprising known as rebellion of Goharshad Mosque against the Reza Pahlavi. He was active individual during this uprising. Finally he had arrested by pahlavi regime and condemned to death.

== Works ==
He was an eminent authority among shia in Iran. he wrote books on jurisprudence, principles and theology. they are as follow:

- the book of judgment and witness and the verbals section(on philosophy of language)
- A glossary on Kefayah al Osul
- Taghrirat(writings)

== See also ==
- Mohammad-Kazem Khorasani
- Iranian Constitutional Revolution
