= Saadat Association =

- foundation: approximately 1908
- Termination: Probably 1910
- Target: Establishment of constitutional government
- Operational area: Azerbaijan (Iran)
- chief: Asadullah Mamaghani
- People and businessmen of Tabriz or Iranian Azerbaijan

Saadat Association (سعادت انجمنی) – an organization established in Istanbul by pro-constitutional merchants from Tabriz.

== About ==
The Saadat Association was formed in 1908 in the Ottoman Empire’s capital, Istanbul, by constitutionalist merchants from Tabriz following the shelling of the Iranian Majles. The association engaged in disseminating news from Iranian Azerbaijan to clerics in Najaf and various other parts of the world. It also played a significant role in financially supporting the constitutionalist movement by collecting monetary donations. Some clerics from the Najaf seminary developed relations with the association and authorized the collection of donations intended for the besieged constitutionalists in Tabriz.

Initially, the Association consisted of 30 members—10 merchants and 20 artisans. Meetings were held twice a week. After the Majles was shelled, several Iranian political activists fled to Tiflis and Baku. However, due to increasing pressure from Tsarist authorities in the Caucasus, they found it increasingly difficult to carry out political activities there and gradually relocated to Istanbul, where many eventually joined the Saadat Association.

The historian Rahim Aliyev notes that the Saadat Association maintained close ties with the Young Turks movement, which had recently come to power in the Ottoman Empire. According to him, the relocation of the Iranian Azerbaijani cleric Asadullah Mamaghani from Najaf to Istanbul, and his appointment to the leadership of the Association in November 1908, was influenced by this connection, as Mamaqani had established relations with the Young Turks.

The Association also published a newspaper titled Sirush (1909–1910) in Istanbul. Its editorial team included Seyyid Mohammad Tofiq, Ali-Akbar Dehkhoda (a leading correspondent of Sur-e Esrafil), Ahmad Bey Aghayev, and Yahya Dowlatabadi.

Mahammad Amin Rasulzade mentions that the Iranian revolutionary movement was supported by various groups based in Baku and Istanbul. Among these groups, he specifically names the Saadat Association.

== Sources ==
- Behrangi, Samed (1347), Āzarbāijān dar Jonbeš-e Mašrūṭe (Yek Nemūne az Maqālāt-e Taḥqīqī-ye Samed), Āraš. 3 (5)
- Āfārī, Žānat (1385), Enqelāb-e Mašrūṭeh-ye Īrān 1906–1911 (1285–1290). Tarjome-ye Reżā Reżāʾī, Tehrān: Nashr-e Bīstūn, ISBN 964-90036-8-1
- Alam, Mohammad-Reza (1386), Bāzshenāsī-ye mobārezāt-e qadamī-ye ʿolamā-ye ʿAtabāt jahat-e eʿāde-ye mashrūṭiyyat-e Īrān, ʿUlūm-e Ensānī-ye Dāneshgāh-e Al-Zahrā
- Ələkbərli, Faiq (2021), Qacarlar dövlətinin süqutu dövrü: Məşrutə hərəkatı və Səttarxan (4. Yazı)
- Çingizoğlu, Ənvər (2011), Məşrutə ensiklopediyası (in Azerbaijani), Bakı
