= Abdallah Mazandarani =

Iranian Shia Marja' and politician (1840–1912)

Grand Ayatollah Sheikh Abdallah Mazandarani
- عبدالله مازندرانی
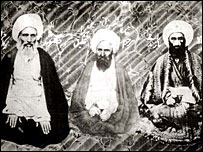
- The trio: (left to right) Akhund Khurasani, Mirza Husayn Tehrani and Abdullah Mazandarani

Personal life
- Born: 1840 Amol, Iran
- Died: 1912 Najaf, Iraq
- Region: Najaf, Iraq

Religious life
- Religion: Islam
- Jurisprudence: Twelver Shia Islam

Muslim leader
- Based in: Najaf, Iraq
- Post: Grand Ayatollah
- Period in office: 1894–1912

Abdallah Mazandarani (Persian: عبدالله مازندرانی; AD 1840–1912; AH 1256–1330) was a Shia Marja' and a leader of the constitutional movement against the Qajar dynasty. He was a pupil of Mirzaye Rashti. He worked alongside Akhund Khurasani and Mirza Ḥusayn Khalīlī Tihranī to support the first democratic revolution of Asia, Iran's Constitutional Revolution (1905–1911), and co-signed all major statements of the main source of emulation, Akhund Khurasani.

== Early life ==
His full name was Molla Abdullah Langrudi. His father was Shaykh Muhammad Nasir Gilani who traveled from Gilan to Mazandaran province in Iran. Abdullah was born in the city of Barfrus, known today as Amol, in the north of Iran. After completing his early education in Iran, he traveled to Atabat. In Karbala, he took part in the scientific courses of Zayn-al-ʿābedīn Māzandarānī and Shaikh Ḥasan Ardakānī. Then he went to Najaf, another important Shia city, to continue his studies. It is thought that he remained there for the rest of his life.

=== Teachers ===
He started his education in Barforush Seminary. He took part in Mulla Muhammad Ashrafi classes. Then he moved to Iraq. Mazandarani's teachers included Shaykh Mahdi Kashef Al Ghata, Zayn Al Abedin Mazandarani, Shaykh Hasan Ardekani, Molla Muhammad Iravani, and Mirza Habib Allah Rashti.

== Political life ==
Mazandarani was, along with Mohammad Kazem Khorasani and Hossein Khalili, counted among those Ulama who resisted the Qajar dynasty. They were also known as "Ulama Thalathah of Najaf" city. Abdullah was one of the primary figures in the constitutional movement. He played an important part in the constitutional movement, which included encouraging people to resist the Russian invasion and unfair contracts, and writing letters in support of the Islamic religion. Along with Mohammad Kazem Khorasani, Mazandarani protested against the policies and interference of the English government in the internal affairs of Iran. He supported the movement of Iranian people during constitutionalism and sent telegrams and letters to encourage them. Akhund Khurasani, Mirza Husayn Tehrani and Shaykh Abdullah Mazandarani, theorised a model of religious secularism in the absence of Imam, that still prevails in Shia seminaries.

The period from the destruction of the first parliament under the orders of Mohammad Ali Shah on June 23, 1908, to the Shah's deposition on July 16, 1909, is called the Lesser Despotism in modern Iranian history. The Shah repeatedly delayed the elections under the guise of fighting sedition and defending Islam. Mohammad Ali Shah wrote letters to the sources of emulation in Najaf, seeking their support against the perceived conspiracies of Babis and other heretics. However, Akhund Khurasani, Mirza Tehrani and Mirza Abdullah Mazandarani responded by affirming the religious legitimacy of democracy and advised the Shah to work within the constitutional framework in improving the conditions of society and defending the country against colonial influence.

== See also ==
- Muhammad Kazim Khurasani
- Mirza Husayn Tehrani
- Mirza Ali Aqa Tabrizi
- Iranian Constitutional Revolution
- Intellectual movements in Iran
- Mirza Malkom Khan
- Mirza Hussein Naini
