= Sayyid Jamal al-Din Va'iz =

Iranian cleric (1862–1908)

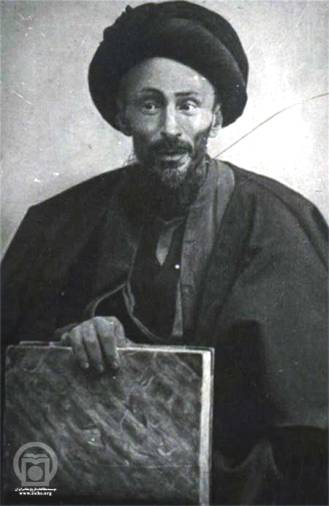
Sayyid Jamal al-Din ca. 1905

Sayyid Jamal al-Din "Va'iz" Esfahani (Persian: سید جمال‌الدین واعظ اصفهانی; also known as Seyed Jamal Vaez ["The Preacher"], 1862–1908) was a popular pro-constitutional preacher and writer in Iran. He was one of the founders of a constitutional movement in Isfahan in 1890s. He wrote for the reformist newspapers - especially for Al Jamal. He wrote mostly about the economy and the financial autonomy of Persia, which he compared it to jihad.

He is the father of Iranian writer Mohammad Ali Jamalzadeh.

== The Constitutional Revolution ==
One major concern of Akhund Khurasani and other Marja's was to familiarize the public with the ideas of a democratic nation-state and modern constitution. Akhund Khurasani asked Iranian scholars to deliver sermons on the subject to clarify doubts seeded by Nuri and his comrades. Hajj Shaikh Muhammad Va'iz Isfahani, a skillful orator of Tehran, made concerted efforts to educate the masses. Another scholar, Sayyid Jamal al-Din Va'iz continuously refuted Nuri's propaganda and said that religious tyranny was worse than the temporal tyranny as the harm that the corrupt clerics inflict upon Islam and Muslims is worse. He advised the Shia masses to not pay attention to everyone with a turban on his head, rather they should listen to the guidelines of the sources of emulation in Najaf. Va'iz was an opponent to Mohammad-Ali Shah Qajar. "As to the ulama in the constitutional revolution, there were varying degrees of support for a constitution and of awareness of its implications. Among the popular preachers there were a number in the tradition of Afghani — men brought up with a religious education and filling, more than Afghani, religious functions, notably preaching, but who were not themselves believers in any usual sense. These included most notably two preacher friends from Isfahan — Malek al-Motakallemin and Sayyed Jamal ad-Din Esfahani, the former the father of the historian of the constitutional revolution, Mehdi Malekzadeh, and the latter the father of Iran's first great modern short-story writer, Mohammad-Ali Jamalzadeh. Malek al-Motakallamin was long an Azali Bábí, although by the time he became a preacher in the revolution he appears to have lost even this belief, while Sayyed Jamal ad-Din Esfahani was described by his son as a freethinker. They both recognized the appeal of Islam to the masses and bazaaris, however. [...] In Tehran, the two became major preachers of the revolutionary and constitutional cause, explaining it in familiar Muslim terms emphasizing such Islamic concepts, particularly central in Shi'ism, as Justice and Oppression. Mohammad-Ali Shah considered them among the most dangerous of his enemies and had them both killed in 1908, as he did the editor of Sur-e Esrafil, Mirza Jahangir Khan, also of Bábí background."

== Publications ==
- Lebas ot taqva - against import of goods
- The True Dream with Majd al- Islam Kirmani (1872–1922)

== See also ==
- Sadr (name)

== Bibliography ==
- Farzaneh, Mateo Mohammad (March 2015). Iranian Constitutional Revolution and the Clerical Leadership of Khurasani. Syracuse, NY: Syracuse University Press. ISBN 9780815633884. OCLC 931494838.
- Mangol, Bayat (1991). Iran's First Revolution: Shi'ism and the Constitutional Revolution of 1905-1909. Oxford, New York: Oxford University Press. ISBN 978-0-19-506822-1.
- Ansari, Sarah F. D.; Martin, Vanessa (2002). Women, religion and culture in Iran. Richmond, Surrey: Curzon in association with the Royal Asiatic Society of Great Britain and Ireland. p. 223. ISBN 0-7007-1509-6.
- Kian, A. (1998). The Secularisation of Iran (Travaux et mémoires de l'Institut d'études iraniennes). Peeters Publishers. p. 55. ISBN 90-429-0032-6.
- Kashani-Sabet, Firoozeh (1999). Frontier fictions: shaping the Iranian nation, 1804-1946. Princeton, NJ: Princeton University Press. pp. 98, 255. ISBN 0-691-00497-8.
