= Mirza Husayn Tehrani =

Iraqi Islamic scholar and jurist (1815–1908)

Grand Ayatollah Sheikh Mirza Husayn Tehrani
- میرزا حسین خلیلی تهرانی
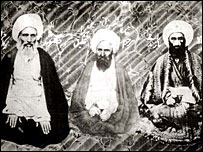
- The trio: (left to right) Akhund Khurasani, Mirza Husayn Tehrani and Abdullah Mazandarani

Personal life
- Born: 1815 Najaf, Ottoman Empire
- Died: 1908 Najaf, Ottoman Empire
- Region: Najaf, Iraq

Religious life
- Religion: Islam
- Jurisprudence: Twelver Shia Islam

Muslim leader
- Based in: Najaf, Iraq
- Post: Grand Ayatollah
- Period in office: 1891–1908

Ayatollah Mirza Husayn Khalili Tehrani (1815-1908) (Persian: میرزا حسین خلیلی تهرانی) was an Usuli Shi'a jurist and among the four sources of emulation at the time of Iranian Constitutional Revolution (1905–1911). He worked alongside Akhund Khurasani and Shaykh Abdullah Mazandarani to support the first democratic revolution of Asia, Iran's Constitutional Revolution, and co-signed all major statements issued from the seminary of Najaf in support of democracy.

== Career ==
In 1891, he became a Marja', and by the demise of Mirza Shirazi in 1895 he was listed among great jurists, and many people from Tehran followed him. When the parliament came under attack from imperial court's cleric, Shaykh Fazlullah Nuri, Tehrani alongside other jurists of Najaf sided with democracy and acted as a legitimising force. They invoked the Quranic command of ‘enjoining good and forbidding wrong’ to justify democracy in the period of occultation, and linked opposition to the constitutional movement to ‘a war against the Imam of the Age’. Akhund Khurasani, Mirza Husayn Tehrani and Shaykh Abdullah Mazandarani, theorised a model of religious secularity in the absence of Imam, that still prevails in Shia seminaries.

The period from the destruction of the first parliament under the orders of Mohammad Ali shah on June 23, 1908, to the Shah's deposition on July 16, 1909, is called as the Lesser Despotism in the history of modern Iran. The shah repeatedly delayed the elections under the guise of fighting sedition and defending Islam. Mohammad Ali shah wrote letters to the sources of emulation in Najaf, seeking their support against the conspiracies he alleged by Babis and other heretics. However, Akhund Khurasani, Mirza Tehrani and Mirza Abdullah Mazandarani responded by affirming the religious legitimacy of democracy and advised the shah to work within the constitutional framework in improving the conditions of society and defending the country against colonial influence.

== See also ==
- Muhammad Kazim Khurasani
- Abdallah Mazandarani
- Mirza Ali Aqa Tabrizi
- Iranian Constitutional Revolution
- Intellectual movements in Iran
- Mirza Malkom Khan
- Mirza Hussein Naini
