= Muhammad Hussain Naini =

Iranian Islamic scholar (1860–1936)

Grand Ayatollah Sheikh Mohammad-Hossein Naini
- شيخ محمد حسين نائينى غروی
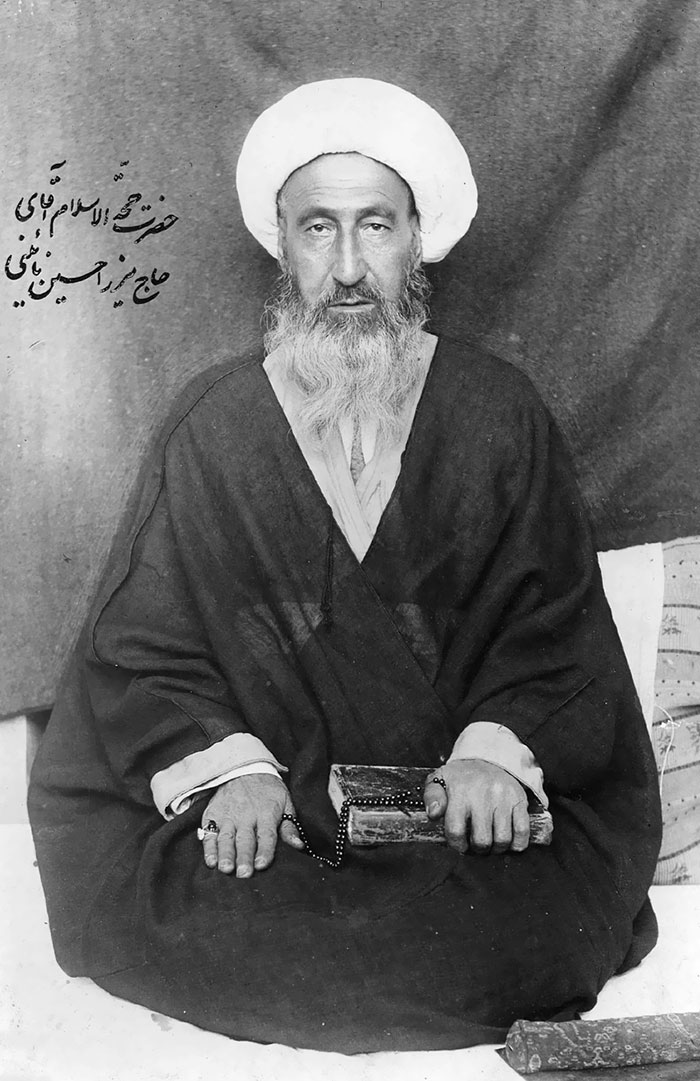

Personal life
- Born: 25 May 1860 Nain, Sublime State of Iran
- Died: 14 August 1936 (aged 76) Najaf, Kingdom of Iraq
- Resting place: Imam Ali Shrine
- Region: Najaf, Kingdom of Iraq
- Main interest(s): Islamic philosophy, Usul al-fiqh
- Notable work(s): Tanbih al-Ummah wa Tanzih al-Milla; Vassilat'un Nijat; Ressalat la Zarar

Religious life
- Religion: Islam
- Denomination: Twelwer Shi'a
- Jurisprudence: Ja'fari

Muslim leader
- Based in: Najaf, Iraq
- Period in office: 1911–1936
- Predecessor: Akhund Khorasani
- Successor: Abu al-Hasan Isfahani

Grand Ayatollah Sheikh Mohammad-Hossein Naini Gharavi (Persian: محمد حسین نائینی غروی; 25 May 1860 – 14 August 1936) was an Iranian Shia marja'.

His father Mirza Abdol Rahim and grandfather Haji Mirza Saeed, both one were Sheikhs of Nain and Mohammad Hussein proved himself the most competent student of Ayatollah Kazem Khorasani. Ayatollah Naini is considered to be the most famous theoretician of Iran's Constitutional Revolution. He died in 1936 and was buried next to shrine of Imam Ali in Iraq. Among his works, notable references are his Dubios Habit, Vassilat'un Nijat, and Ressalat la Zarar. The 50th death anniversary of Ayatollah Mirza Mohammed Hussein Naini was memorialized by issuing postage stamps in Iran, in 1987.

== Biography ==
Mirza Muhammad Hossein Naini was born to a respected and religious family of Nain on 25 May 1860 (15 Dzulqadah 1276 Lunar Hijrah). His father Mirza Abdol Rahim and grandfather Haji Mirza Saeed, one after another were Sheikhs of Nain. Ayatollah Muhammad Hussein Naini, who is better known as Mirza Naini, did his primary studies in Nain and then in 1877 when he was 17 years old, moved to Isfahan. Here he lived with Haji Shaikh Muhammad Baqir Isfahani for seven years. The latter belonged to a distinguished clerical family of Isfahan and was himself the most powerful Mujtahid of that city. After completing basic education he moved to Najaf, Iraq, to achieve the degree of Ijtihad. He proved himself the most competent student of Ayatollah Kazem Khorasani Ayatollah Naini is considered to be the most famous theoretician of Iran's Constitutional Revolution.

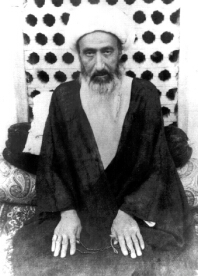
Mirza Naini in Najaf

== Ideas and Action ==
=== Defending democracy ===
One major concern of Akhund Khurasani and other Marja's was to familiarize the public with the ideas of a democratic nation-state and modern constitution. Akhund Khurasani asked Iranian scholars to deliver sermons on the subject to clarify doubts seeded by Nuri and his comrades. His close associate and student, who later rose to the rank of Marja, Muhammad Hussain Naini, wrote a book, “Tanbih al-Ummah wa Tanzih al-Milla”(Persian: تنبیه‌ الامه و تنزیه‌ المله), to counter the propaganda of Nuri group. He devoted many pages to distinguish between tyrannical and democratic regimes. In democracies, power is distributed and limited through constitution. He maintained that in the absence of Imam Mahdi, all governments are doomed to be imperfect and unjust, and therefore people had to prefer the bad over the worse. Hence, the constitutional democracy was the best option to help improve the condition of the society as compared to absolutism, and run the worldly affairs with consultation and better planning. he saw the elected members of the parliament as representatives of the people, not deputies of the Imam, hence they didn't need a religious justification for their authority. He said that both the “tyrannical Ulema” and the radical societies who promoted majoritarianism were a threat to both Islam and democracy. The people should avoid the destructive, corrupt and divisive forces and maintain national unity. He devoted large section of his book to definition and condemnation of religious tyranny. He then went on to defend people's freedom of opinion and expression, equality of all citizens in eyes of the nation-state regardless of their religion, separation of the legislative, executive and judicial powers, accountability of the King, people's right to share power.

=== Pupils ===
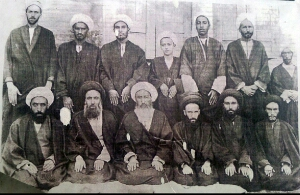
Mirza Naini (in mid) with some other scholars and students

Names of the some students benefited from the teaching of Mirza Naini, includes the following scholars and clerics of their time:

- 1. Sheikh Mohammad Ali Kazemi Khorassani
- 2. Seyyed Mohsen Tabatabai Hakim.
- 3. Grand Ayotollah Khoei.
- 4. Seyyed Mohammad Hossein Tabatabai
- 5. Grand Ayatollah Taqi Bahjat
- 6. Sayyed Hadi Milani
- 7. Sayyed Jamal Al din Golpayegani
- 8. Sheikh Muhammad Ali Kazemini
- 9. Sheikh Mousa Khansari
- 10. Syed Ali Naqi Naqvi

=== Naini as a politician ===
Ayatollah Naini was active both in the Persian Constitutional Revolution and in Iraqi politics. As a politician his principal view with regard to form of government is very clear. He suggested the form of government by an infallible ruler fully responsible to the will of God, which might be able to safeguard the interests of people. Such type of ruling is not possible in the era of major occultation of Imam Mahdi. Therefore, efforts should be made to arrange the ruling of just and honest men with duty to control the government, directly responsible to the will of God through Imam Mahdi. He further argued that in such a situation it is the known fact that access to leaders with such respected characteristics’ becomes unquestionable and people usually have no say over such matters, it is thus obligatory to observe the following two principles: to implement law, and to appoint wise men as "supervisors".

== Works ==
Mirza Naini being an expert on Usul al Fiqh was the first human being in the history of Iran to construe the idea of religious dictatorship. Naini stressed the concept of Aql (dialectic reasoning) and believed that Islam was compatible with progress. He also argued that the most intolerable form of autocracy is the tyranny imposed by a religious state. He had written a book Tanbih al-Ummah wa Tanzih Al-Milla (the awakening of the community and refinement of the nations) which was translated into Arabic by Salih Kashi al Gheta and published in 1909 by the Institute of Strategic Studies in Baghdad. His book mainly relates to theory of constitutional revolution with his deliberations on the major topics of “Ignorance and Despotism”. In his book, he discussed interalia, the view that freedom of the pen and speech both are God given freedom necessary for liberation from despotism (taghut). Elaborating his view and in replying to opponents of Constitutionalism he pointed out that Islamic Law has two distinct categories: the primary laws are based on the Quran and other known Islamic principles, were unchangeable. The secondary laws, in contrast, were subject to change, depending on temporal and spatial circumstances, making them the proper sphere for legislation.

== Exile ==
At the beginning of World War I, the Shiite Scholars and clerics of Iraq were not the supporter of allied powers, however, they entered the scene and declared holy war against the Central power. Consequently, Mirza Naini was exiled with Abu al-Hasan al-Isfahani to Iran. They were welcome and received by Abdul-Karim Ha'eri Yazdi, the then head of Feizieh religious school. However, after a short stay Naini was allowed for his return to Iraq with advice not to be involved in politics.

== Death ==
Ayatollah Mirza Hussain Naini died in 1936 at the age of 76. He is buried in Najaf.

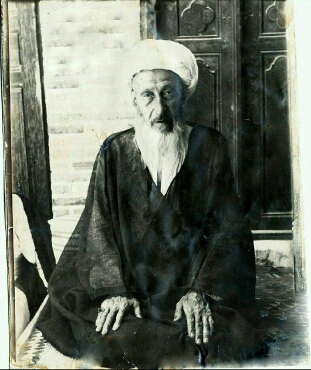
Naini in his old age

== See also ==
- Iranian Constitutional Revolution
- Intellectual movements in Iran
- Mohammad-Kazem Khorasani

== Bibliography ==
- Nouraie, Fereshte M. (1975). "The Constitutional Ideas of a Shi'ite Mujtahid: Muhammad Husayn Na'ini". Iranian Studies. 8 (4): 234–247. doi:10.1080/00210867508701501. ISSN 0021-0862. JSTOR 4310208.
- Mangol, Bayat (1991). Iran's First Revolution: Shi'ism and the Constitutional Revolution of 1905-1909. Oxford, New York: Oxford University Press. ISBN 978-0-19-506822-1.
- Farzaneh, Mateo Mohammad (March 2015). Iranian Constitutional Revolution and the Clerical Leadership of Khurasani. Syracuse, NY: Syracuse University Press. ISBN 9780815633884. OCLC 931494838.
- Hermann, Denis (1 May 2013). "Akhund Khurasani and the Iranian Constitutional Movement". Middle Eastern Studies. 49 (3): 430–453. doi:10.1080/00263206.2013.783828. ISSN 0026-3206. JSTOR 23471080. S2CID 143672216.
- Sayej, Caroleen Marji (2018). Patriotic Ayatollahs: Nationalism in Post-Saddam Iraq. Ithaca, NY: Cornell University Press. p. 67. doi:10.7591/cornell/9781501715211.001.0001. ISBN 9781501714856.
