= Muhammad-Ridha al-Sistani =

Iraqi Ayatollah

Ayatollah Sayyid Muhammad-Ridha al-Sistani
- محمد رضا السيستاني

Personal life
- Born: 18 August 1962 (age 64) Najaf, Iraq
- Children: 3
- Parent: Ali al-Sistani (father)
- Education: Hawza of Najaf
- Relatives: Mirza al-Shirazi (great-great grandfather)

Religious life
- Religion: Islam
- Sect: Shia; Twelver

Muslim leader
- Based in: Najaf, Iraq

Muhammad-Ridha al-Husayni al-Sistani (Arabic: محمد رضا الحسيني السيستاني, born 18 August 1962), is an Iraqi Islamic scholar and professor. He is the eldest son of Grand Ayatollah Ali al-Sistani and primarily runs his father's office and oversees the financial and administrative work.

== Early life and education ==
Muhammad-Ridha al-Sistani was born in Najaf, Iraq, to Sayyid Ali al-Sistani, and the daughter of Sayyid Muhammad-Hassan Shirazi (grandson of Mirza al-Shirazi). He comes from a respectable lineage of scholars, traced back to the 17th century. His family claim descent from the fourth Shia Imam, Ali ibn Husayn.

He joined the Najaf seminary in September, 1974. He conducted his jurisprudence studies under the leading jurist of his time, Sayyid Abu al-Qasim al-Khoei in September, 1979. He attended the principles of jurisprudence classes of his father, Sayyid Ali al-Sistani, in March, 1991. He began teaching manasik in September 2003.

== Political stances ==
His father, Grand Ayatollah Ali al-Sistani has openly criticised foreign meddling in Iraqi affairs, stating: "No person or group, no side with a particular view, no regional or international actor may seize the will of the Iraqi people and impose its will on them." Due to the events preceding the issuance of the statement, it has been interpreted by some as a direct warning to Iran.

He played a major role in ending the 2022 Baghdad clashes by calling Muqtada al-Sadr by phone and conveying a message to him from his father Ali al-Sistani, which stated that Sadr was responsible for any bloodshed and urged him to call on his group to end the violence. Sadr responded by ordering his forces to end their attacks, as well as apologizing for the violence that broke out.

He has said that Iraqis have the right to govern themselves and choose their own rulers without the domination or interference of foreigners.

== Works ==
Al-Sistani has written a number of books in jurisprudence and principles of jurisprudence. Some of them include:

- Wasa'il al-Injab al-Sina'iya (Fertilization Through Assisted Technological Methods)
- Wasa'il al-Man' Min al-Injab (Contraceptive Methods)
- Janabat al-Mar'a Bighayr al-Muqaraba (Women's State of Impurity Without Intercourse)
- Zaawaj al-Bikr al-Rashida Bighayr Ithn al-Wali (Marriage of a Mature Virgin Without Guardians Consent)
- Buhuth Fiqhiya (Jurisprudential research regarding meat slaughter without the use of metal, veiling, beauty and other issues.)
- Buhuth Fi Sharh Manasik al-Hajj (Research in dissecting manasik of Hajj). 10 volumes.

== Personal life ==
His mother died on September 29, 2025, and the Iraqi president, Abdul Latif Rashid, sent his condolences to al-Sistani, his father, and brother.
