= Big Four (Najaf) =

Iraqi Twelver Shia Islam Grand Ayatollahs

The Big Four refers to the four contemporary leading Grand Ayatollahs of Twelver Shia Islam based in the holy city of Najaf in Iraq.

== Background ==
All Twelver Shia Muslims follow the Islamic rulings of a Grand Ayatollah. Under Saddam Hussein, the clerics were oppressed. At present, the most prominent among them is Ali al-Sistani; who also serves as the head of the Hawza of Najaf.

== List ==
Grand Ayatollah	Date of birth	Place of birth	Date of death	Place of death
(The names are arranged in alphabetical order)
Ali al-Sistani	4 August 1930 (age 96)	Mashhad, Imperial State of Iran		
Bashir al-Najafi	1942 (age 83–84)	Jalandhar, British Raj		
Muhammad al-Fayadh	21 August 1930	Ghazni, Kingdom of Afghanistan	4 June 2026 (aged 95)	Najaf, Iraq
Muhammad Saeed al-Hakim	1 February 1936	Najaf, Kingdom of Iraq	3 September 2021 (aged 85)	Najaf, Iraq
