= Karbalaei (surname) =

al-Karbalaei (Arabic: الكربلائي; Persian: كربلائى) is an Arabic surname that it is used to indicate the person originates from Karbala, Iraq. Notable people with the surname include:

- Basim al-Karbalaei (born 1966), Shia eulogy reciter
- Abdul Mahdi al-Karbalai, the official representative of Grand Ayatollah Sayed Ali Al-Sistani in Iraq.
- Mehdi Karbalaei (born 1993), Iranian football defender
