= Diama (disambiguation) =

Diama (born 1980), is a Swiss singer.

Diama may also refer to:

- Diama, Senegal, a village in the Dagana Department, Senegal
- Diama, an island in the Louisiade Archipelago of Papua New Guinea
- Diama Maramanikaibau, Fijian athlete, gold medalist at the 2013 Pacific Mini Games
- Drosophila diama, a species of fly in the genus Drosophila
- Qatāda ibn Diʿāma (died 736), hadiths narrator who detailed the Manasik

== See also ==
- Diamma, a genus of ants
- Diana (disambiguation)
