= Amman Message =

2004 sermon in Jordan

The Amman Message is a declaration issued in Amman, Jordan, in November 2004 by king Abdullah II to clarify the nature of Islam and promote religious tolerance and unity among Muslims. It affirmed the validity of the eight major madhhabs of Sunni Islam and Shia Islam, as well as Ibadism. The declaration also emphasized the importance of recognizing qualified Islamic scholars and adhering to established principles of Islamic jurisprudence (fiqh). The Amman Message received endorsements from hundreds of Islamic scholars and religious authorities from around the Muslim world.

== Content ==
The Amman Message was delivered in Amman, Jordan, as a Ramadan sermon by Chief Justice Sheikh Izz-Eddine Al-Tamimi in the presence of King Abdullah II and a number of Muslim scholars. In a subsequent speech, King Abdullah invited 24 senior scholars from all legal schools to debate the following questions:

1. Who is a Muslim?
2. Is it permissible to declare someone an apostate?
3. Who has the right to undertake issues relating to fatwas (legal rulings)?

The next year, in July 2005, an Islamic convention brought together 200 Muslim scholars from over 50 countries who issued a three-point declaration, later known as the "Three Points of the Amman Message". This declaration focused on:

1. The declaration that followers of eight legal schools of sharia or fiqh (madhāhib) as being Muslims whose blood are inviolable and the varying schools of Islamic theology, namely:
  1. Sunni Hanafi
  2. Sunni Maliki
  3. Sunni Shafi'i
  4. Sunni Hanbali
  5. Shia Jaʿfari
  6. Shia Zaydi
  7. Ẓāhirī
  8. Ibadi
  - And forbiddance of declaring anyone an apostate who is a follower of:
  1. the Ashʿari or Maturidi creed
  2. real Tasawwuf (Sufism)
  3. true Salafi thought
2. The forbiddance from pronouncing disbelief (takfir) upon or excommunicating others recognised as Muslims
3. The stipulations placed as preconditions to the issuing of religious edicts, intended to prevent the circulation of illegitimate edicts

== Background ==
The declaration was created in the midst of global tensions relating to the war on terror following the September 11 attacks, and in the wake of the Iraq War. Where the message is primarily constructed as an internal dialogue between Muslim scholars, it clearly addresses Western powers. Explaining why the message was issued, King Abdullah stated: "[We] felt that the Islamic message of tolerance was being subjected to a fierce and unjust attack from some in the West who do not understand Islam's essence, and others who claim to be associated with Islam and hide behind Islam to commit irresponsible deeds."

== Conference and declarations ==
The following are conferences and declarations related to the message:

- The International Islamic Conference: True Islam and Its Role in Modern Society, Amman, 27–29 Jumada II 1426 AH (4–6 July 2005 CE),
- Forum of Muslim Ulama and Thinkers, Mecca, 5–7 Sha'ban 1426 AH (9–11 September 2005),
- First International Islamic Conference Concerning the Islamic Schools of Jurisprudence and the Modern Challenges, Al al-Bayt University, 13–15 Shawwal AH (15–17 November 2005),
- The Third Extraordinary Session of the Organization of the Islamic Conference, 5–6 Dhu al-Qadah 1426 AH (7–8 December 2005),
- The Second International Conference of the Assembly for Moderate Islamic Thought and Culture, 25–27 Rabi' I 1427 AH (24–26 April 2006),
- The International Islamic Fiqh Academy Conference Seventeenth Session, Amman, 28 Jumada I – 2 Jumada II 1427 AH (24–28 June 2006),
- Muslims of Europe Conference, Istanbul, 1–2 July 2006,
- The ninth session of the council of the Conference of Ministers of Religious Endowments and Islamic Affairs, Kuwait, 20–21 1426 AH (22–23 November 2005),
- Amman Message in the Eyes of Others: Dialogue, Moderation, Humanity, Hashemite University, 20–21 September 2006

== Fatwas and endorsements ==
The following is a list of some of the individuals and organisations who have issued fatwas and endorsements in relation to the Amman Message:

Sr No	Name	Title	Country	Sect	Fiqh	Endorsing fatwa	Website	Image
1	Muhammad Sayyid Tantawy	Grand Imam of Al-Azhar University	Egypt	Sunni	Shafiʿi	Fatwa	Official website	
2	Ali Gomaa	Grand Mufti of Egypt	Egypt	Sunni	Shafiʿi	Fatwa	Official website	
3	Ali Bardakoğlu	President of the Grand Council for Religious Affairs, Turkey	Turkey	Sunni	Hanafi	Fatwa	Official website	
4	Ahmed Kuftaro	Grand Mufti of Syria	Syria	Sunni	Shafiʿi	Fatwa	Official website	
5	Said Abd Al-Hafiz Al-Hijjawi	Grand Mufti of Jordan	Jordan	Sunni	Shafiʿi	Fatwa	–	
6	Nuh Ha Mim Keller	Islamic scholar	Jordan	Sunni	Shafiʿi	Fatwa	–	
7	Yusuf al-Qaradawi	Director of the Sunna and Sira Council	Egypt; Qatar	Sunni	–	Fatwa	Official website	
8	Abdullah bin Bayyah	Vice President of the International Union of Muslim Scholars	Mauritania	Sunni	Maliki	Fatwa	Official website	
9	Taqi Usmani	Vice President of the Islamic Fiqh Academy	Pakistan	Sunni	Hanafi	Fatwa	–	
10	Sayyid Shaykh Nazim Al-Haqqani	Leader of the Naqshbandi Haqqani Sufi Order	Northern Cyprus	Sunni	Hanafi	–	Official website	
11	Abdullah al-Harari	Founder of the Al-Ahbash	Ethiopia	Sunni	Shafiʿi	Fatwa	Official website	
12	Muhammad Tahir ul-Qadri	Founding Leader of Minhaj-ul-Quran International, Chief Executive of Minhaj International University	Pakistan	Sunni	Hanafi	–	Official website	
13	Habib Ali al-Jifri	Founding Leader of Tabah Foundation in Abu Dhabi, Member of Royal Aal al-Bayt Institute for Islamic Thought in Amman	Yemen	Sunni	Shafiʿi	–	Official website	
14	Habib Umar bin Hafiz	Founding Leader and the dean of Dar al-Mustafa in Tarim, Yemen	Yemen	Sunni	Shafiʿi	–	Official website	
15	Ali Hosseini Khamenei	Grand Ayatollah, Supreme Leader of Iran	Iran	Shia	Jafari	Fatwa	Official website	
16	Muhammad Saeed al-Hakim	Grand Ayatollah	Iraq	Shia	Jafari	Fatwa	Official website	
17	Mohammad Ishaq Al-Fayyad	Grand Ayatollah	Iraq	Shia	Jafari	Fatwa	Official website	
18	Basheer Hussain Najafi	Grand Ayatollah	Iraq	Shia	Jafari	Fatwa	Official website	
19	Hussein Esmaeel al-Sadr	Grand Ayatollah	Iraq	Shia	Jafari	Fatwa	Official website	
20	Fazel Lankarani	Grand Ayatollah	Iran	Shia	Jafari	Fatwa	Official website	
21	Muhammad Ali Al-Taskhiri	Grand Ayatollah, General Secretary of Forum for Proximity of the Islamic Schools of Jurisprudence	Iran	Shia	Jafari	Fatwa	Official website	
22	Mohammad Hussein Fadlallah	Grand Ayatollah	Lebanon	Shia	Jafari	Fatwa	Official website	
23	Muhammad bin Muhammad Ismail Al-Mansur and Humud bin Abbas Al-Mu'ayyad	Shaykh	Yemen	Shia	Zaidiyyah	Fatwa	Official website	
24	Ibrahim bin Muhammad Al-Wazir	General Secretary, Islamic Unification and Works Movement	Yemen	Shia	Zaidiyyah	Fatwa	Official website	
25	Ahmad bin Hamad Al-Khalili	Mufti of the Sultanate of Oman	Oman	Ibadi	–	Fatwa	Official website	
26	Ali Hosseini Sistani	Grand Ayatollah	Iraq	Shia	Jafari	Fatwa	Official website	
27	Karīm al-Hussaynī	The Āgā Khān IV, Imam of the Shia Imami Nizari Ismailis	Portugal	Shia	Jafari (Nizari Ismaili branch)	Fatwa	Official website	

== Reception ==
According to a 2005 report issued by the International Crisis Group concerning the rise of Jihadi Islamism in the Middle East, the sermon "stressed the need to re-emphasise Islam's core values of compassion, mutual respect, tolerance, acceptance and freedom of religion." Generally the Amman Message has been welcomed by Western leaders as a significant effort towards inter-religious dialogue in an epoch of particular global politico-religious complexity. It has been hailed as "one of the most important initiatives addressing the Christian West within the framework of the dialogue of civilisations" during a period many worried would lead to a clash of civilisations, and has come to be seen as an international reference document.

Tony Blair, while Prime Minister of the United Kingdom, praised the Amman Message and the gathering of numerous Islamic scholars, commenting: "this was a clear message that Islam is not a monolithic faith, but one made up of a rich pattern of diversity, albeit all flowing from the same fount."

To address the Western world has been identified as an important aim of the Amman message, and herewith to serve the more strategic political goals of the Jordanian government and its regional partners. Several scholars have interpreted the declaration as an assertion from the Jordanian government to reassure its international allies of its own moderate stance and to create a position of religious authority within a crowded international arena.

Whereas the declaration is promoted as a "unanimous agreement by all Muslims everywhere," observers have questioned the communicative process leading up to the agreement and its clarity of definitions, and have expressed concern over its tendency to create potential additional binary oppositions. One scholar has pointed out that in spite of advancing "a more inclusive notion of an Islamic community, one also clarifies exclusion by erecting a boundary outside of which other groups will fall," adding that consensus was reached through "tactical silences over and evasions of contentious issues." A lack of explicit reference to – or signatories from – specific communities is mentioned, such as the Alawi, and an omission of certain branches of other communities, such as the Isma'ili. It has been observed that most scholars involved in the debate were those close to the Jordanian state.

The International Crisis Group report expressed the importance of the Amman Message within a context of increasing regional sectarian polarisation in the Middle East. However, it also mentions the likely limited impact of the message, which it assigns to its contents targeting mainly elites while lacking popular legitimacy.

A related initiative in the Philippines is the AMING Message: A Caucus of Religious Leaders for Diversity, Respect and Tolerance, a statement endorsed by Filipino Muslim religious leaders and representatives of various Islamic organizations. The message emphasizes that religious harmony requires "respect, acceptance and recognition of religious differences" and calls upon Filipino Muslims, regardless of fiqh, manhaj or aqeedah, to come together for the common good, respect the rule of law, "agree to disagree", and respect and acknowledge differences among Muslims. It further calls for the participation of religious leaders in peacebuilding, governance, socio-economic development and education to proceed through consensus, consultation and conference.

The AMING Message reflects themes also found in the Amman Message, particularly its emphasis on religious diversity, mutual respect, tolerance, consultation and cooperation for the common good. Whereas the Amman Message was presented as an international initiative addressing Islamic schools of jurisprudence and theology and interreligious relations, the AMING Message applies similar principles in the Philippine context, explicitly calling on Muslims of differing fiqh, manhaj and aqeedah to cooperate while maintaining their respective differences. The AMING Message thus provides a Philippine example of a Muslim religious initiative emphasizing intra-Muslim dialogue and cooperation across differences.

Further criticism has been expressed over the (lack of) actions or policies following the Amman declaration. Local Jordanian leaders have pointed to the limited impact of the Amman Message inside Jordan, manifested through the lack of engagement with the message by Jordanian municipalities, mosques and religious organisations.

Suhail Nakhouda, editor-in-chief of the Amman-based magazine Islamica, stated that the Amman Message did little to effectively address ongoing problems within the country of Jordan: "The problem with the Amman Message is that it bears no relation to the situation on the ground. There is no water, no pavements; the economy is bad, and many young people are out of work. Peoples' lives, as well as the images they see, stay the same." While some point to the religious legitimacy of the Hashemite royal family for its descent from the Islamic Prophet Muhammad, Nakhouda states that King Abdullah's message is likely to be dampened by his lifestyle, which he claims is the subject of criticism.

Despite the ecumenical nature of the Amman Message, a marked decline in Shia-Sunni relations as a result of increased sectarian conflict in such countries as Iraq, Syria, Lebanon, Bahrain and Yemen has taken shape since the message was issued including armed conflict. For some scholars, this has made declarations as the Amman Message all the more important. Others have problematised what has been referred to as a declaration proliferation taking place post-9/11.

== See also ==
- 2016 international conference on Sunni Islam in Grozny
- Outline of Islam
- Glossary of Islam
- Index of Islam-related articles
- "A Common Word Between Us and You"
- Al-Azhar Shia Fatwa
- Interfaith dialogue
- Organisation of Islamic Cooperation
- International Islamic Unity Conference (Iran)
