= Rafed Network for Cultural Development =

- Company type: Public
- Industry: Publications
- Founded: London, UK
- Headquarters: London, UK
- Key people: Institute of Ahl al-Bayt (as) for Restoration of Books
- Products: online publications, books, etc.
- Revenue: ?
- Number of employees: ?
- Website: http://rafed.com

Rafed Network for Cultural Development is behind Rafed.net & Rafed.com (شبكة رافد للتنمية الثقافية), one of the most popular Shi'a websites.

== Origins ==
The rafed network is based in Shi'a academic center of the world. It was established by Institute of Ahl al-Bayt (as) for Restoration of Books (Arabic: Institute of āl al-bayt alayhumassalam li-ihya ul-turrāth, مؤسّسة آل البيت عليهم السلام لإحياء التراث), a large institute that was established in 1983 and has become one of the largest providers of documentation on Shia scholarship in the world, having branches in UK, Germany, Turkey Lebanon and Syria.

== Rafed.net & Rafed.com ==
They are the owners of Rafed.net, a mainly Arabic site, as can be seen from its main page, but it also has an English section. The site is the most third most visited Shi'a site among Alexa Internet users, second only to Irna.com and al-shia.com.

The site has Qur'an translations in multiple languages, including Spanish, French, Russian, English and the original Arabic.

The site is notable for spreading the scholarship of Grand Ayatollah Ali al-Sistani, and is among several Shi'a sites blocked in Saudi Arabia. Joshua Teitelbaum writes:

Many in Saudi Arabia’s minority (about 12%) Shi‘i population seem to spend much of their Internet time at Arabic-language Shi‘i sites. Rafed.net, and other such sites, report that 45% of their traffic comes from the Kingdom. These sites are apparently banned, but the owners switch domain names often and users have developed techniques to get around the Saudi censor.

== See also ==
- The Ahlulbayt (a.s.) Global Information Center
- Ahlul Bayt Digital Islamic Library Project
