= Hawza of Najaf =

Shia seminary in Iraq

Najaf Seminary
- حوزة النجف (Arabic)
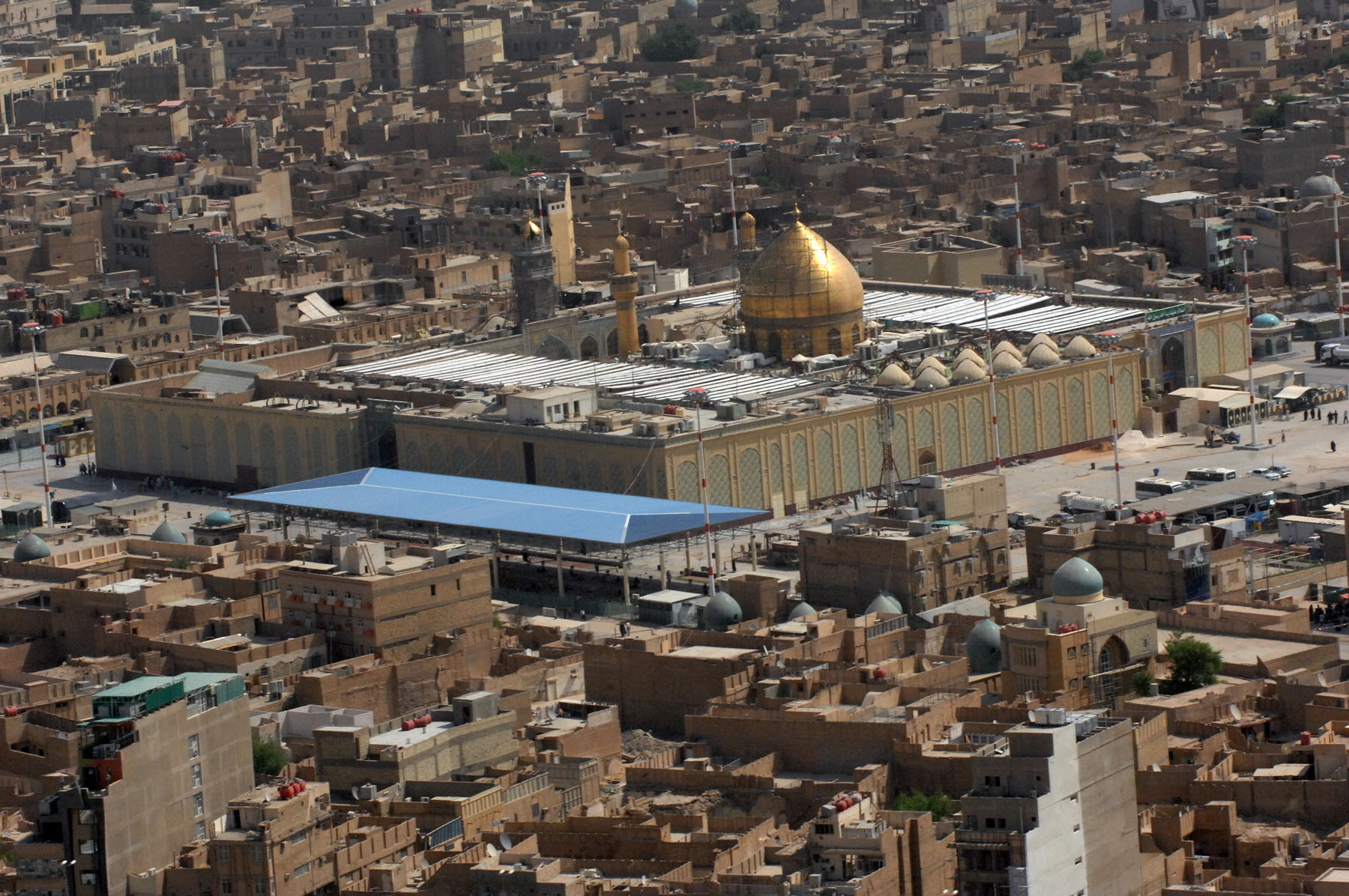
- Type: Hawza
- Established: Possibly c. the 9th century AD, see Founding
- Religious affiliation: Twelver Shia Islam
- Dean: Ali al-Sistani
- Location: Najaf, Iraq
- Campus: Urban
- Language: Arabic
- Location within Iraq

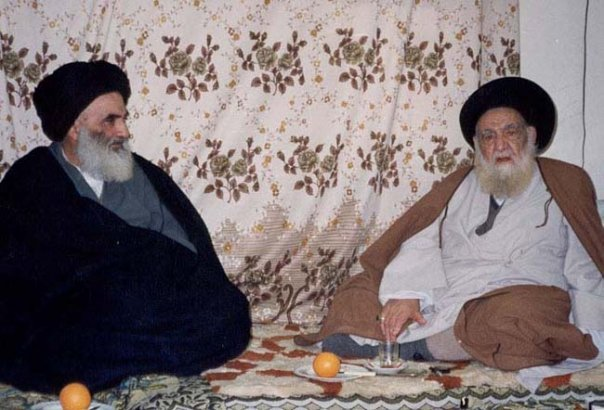
Ali Sistani (current chancellor of Hawza 'Ilmiyya Najaf) and Abu al-Qasim Khoei (ex-chancellor of Hawza 'Ilmiyya Najaf)

The Najaf Seminary (Arabic: حوزة النجف), also known as the al-Hawza al-Ilmiyya (الحوزة العلمية), is the oldest and one of the most important Shia seminaries (hawza) in the world. It is located near the Imam Ali Shrine in the city of Najaf in Iraq, and also operates a campus in Karbala.

Grand Ayatollah Sayed Ali al-Sistani currently serves as head of the Hawza Al-Ilmiyya in Najaf, which includes one other Ayatollah - Bashir al-Najafi.

The number of students studying there has waxed and waned in modern times, from 15,000 to 20,000 in the mid-20th century, down to 3000 during the repressive reign of Saddam Hussein, to around 13,000 as of 2014. Courses include Islamic jurisprudence (fiqh), theology, Islamic philosophy (falsafa), logic (mantiq) and Qurʾanic interpretation (tafsir); completing advanced seminary study in Najaf usually requires at least ten years, and around 200 fully fledged clerics graduate each year.

As of 2014 the curriculum has been updated to include many modern subjects as well as interfaith and inter-sect initiatives.

== History ==
=== Founding ===
The exact date of the establishment of the Hawza of Najaf is unknown, and indeed in what century it was established is disputed, with one view maintaining that the Hawza existed possibly as early as the 9th century AD in the form of a guild of learned men centered around the Imam Ali Shrine whose deanship was held by a number of scholars, such as Ibn al-Sidra Sayyid Sharif al-Din Mohammed and Nasir al-Din Mutahhar Ibn Radhi al-Din Mohammed Ibn Husayn.

Another view, however, claims that Shaykh Tusi established the Hawza in the 11th century AD. Shaykh Tusi first migrated from his native Tus to study in Baghdad —the capital of the Islamic world at the time— but after 12 years he was forced to leave the city due to sectarian tensions, after which he decided to relocate to Najaf. He died in 460 AH (1067 CE).

=== Modern period ===
In the mid-20th century, the Hawza "witnessed huge developments in its educational program" and the student population grew to 15,000-20,000. During the repression of the Baath party era it declined to around 3000 as the Shiite political awakening (Sahwa) was attacked by the regime and attendance by foreign students fell off because of the Iran-Iraq war. By the time Saddam fell in 2003, there were only approximately 3000 students and 2000 clerics in Najaf. Their number then commenced to grow again, and as of 2014 there are 13,000 students, according to a census by Al-Monitor news service, including approximately 50 from foreign countries—Iran, India, Thailand, France, the United States, Canada, etc.

== Structure ==
One of the main pillars of the Najaf Seminary is its leadership, known as the za‘ama (supreme authority). The leader of the seminary is the figure through whom the core positions and policies of the seminary are articulated. This individual typically holds the highest religious rank within the seminary. Although the leader's decisions are not issued as formal orders, they are generally followed and respected. In recent decades, the leadership of the Najaf Seminary has been held by Grand Ayatollahs Muhsin al-Hakim, then Abu al-Qasim al-Khoei, and currently Ali al-Sistani.

The Najaf Seminary is regarded as a foundational institution in the Shia Islamic scholarly tradition. It places strict emphasis on jurisprudence (fiqh) and legal theory (usul al-fiqh), the development of jurists (faqih) and mujtahids (those qualified for independent legal reasoning) above all else. Unlike other seminaries, such as its counterpart in Qom, Najaf places limited focus on philosophy and mysticism (irfan), instead concentrating on advanced jurisprudential studies (dars al-kharij). The seminary favors oversight of politics rather than direct political engagement in the conventional sense. Students are generally discouraged from participating in executive or administrative political roles, and political activism in the typical sense is uncommon within the seminary. Economically, the Najaf Seminary operates independently of government funding, relying instead on public donations and the collection of khums (the one-fifth tax).

In terms of social conduct, Najaf's seminary students adhere to traditional norms and remain largely faithful to its customs. They do make use of modern communication tools. The Seminary does not have a specialized clerical court, as disciplinary matters are handled within Iraq's regular judicial system. Its senior clerics rarely give interviews or issue political statements. Moderation is valued among Najaf scholars, and they have expressed openness to interfaith dialogue. An example is the 2021 meeting between Grand Ayatollah Ali al-Sistani and Pope Francis, which marked a historic dialogue between Najaf and the Vatican. While clerics in Najaf generally do not view existing global governments as ideal, they choose to maintain a positive approach toward engaging with various states.

The Najaf Seminary entered a period of intense scholarly activity beginning in the 11th century AH (17th century CE). This intellectual revival began with Muhammad Baqir Behbahani and continued through recognized scholars such as Mohammad Mahdi Bahr al-‘Ulum, Muhammad Hasan al-Najafi (author of Jawahir al-Kalam), Murtadha Ansari, Hossein Wahid Khorasani, Mirza Shirazi, and Muhammad Hussain Naini, among others. In contemporary times, major religious authorities in Najaf include Ali al-Sistani, Muhammad Is'haq Fayadh, Bashir al-Najafi, and Muhammad Saeed al-Hakim, who died on 3 September 2021.

Teaching in the Najaf Seminary takes place in various venues, including religious schools (such as the courtyards of the Imam Ali Shrine and the Kashif al-Ghita’ School,) as well as in mosques and libraries. Between 14,000 and 15,000 students are currently enrolled in the Najaf Seminary.

== Subjects ==
The subjects taught at the seminary include:

- Mantiq (Logic)
- Usul al-Fiqh (Principles of Jurisprudence)
- Fiqh (Jurisprudence)
- Tafsir al-Qur'an (Qur'an Exegesis)
- Ulum al-Qur'an (Qur'an Sciences)
- Ilm al-Hadith (The Study of Traditions)
- Ilm ar-Rijal (Science of Narrators)
- Tarikh (History)
- Aqaid / Kalam (Theology)
- Lugha (Language Studies)
- Falsafa (Islamic Philosophy)
- Irfan (Islamic Mysticism)
- Fiqh al-Muqaran (Comparative jurisprudence)
- Ilm al-Ma’rifah (Epistemology)

== Trained scholars ==
Some of the known Shia Grand Ayatollahs were trained in the Najaf seminary.

- Ahmad ibn Muhammad Ardabili - he was one of the most famous Shia scholars. He was known as Mohaghegh (researcher) and Moghaddas (saint).
- Moḥammad Mahdī Baḥr al-ʿUlūm - he was known as Baḥr al-Ulum for his considerable knowledge. Bahr al-Ulum was a popular Shia Muslim scholar. He is specifically known as one of the few individuals who attained the climax of spiritual perfection.
- Mohammad Bagher Shafti - he was the leader of Isfahan seminary.
- Akhund Khorasani - he was a student of Murtadha al-Ansari. Khorasani was the greatest Marjaʿ after Mirza Shirazi and before Mohammad Fadhil Sharabiani, he was known as an indubitable master of usul al-fiqh. He authored a book focused on commercial law.
- Abu al-Qasim al-Khoei - Ali al-Sistani was his student. He was made the most prominent Grand Ayatollah in 1971 after the death of Muhsin al-Hakim. He was well-known author in Hadith studies and Rijal and Kalam knowledge.
- Ibn Idris Hilli - he founded the Hillah seminary.
- Mirza Shirazi - he was the leader of Samarra seminary and Tobacco Protest.
- Mohammad Ibrahim al-Karbasi - revived Isfahan seminary, and served as its Dean.
- Abdul-Karim Haeri Yazdi - he was the founder of the Qom Seminary in Iran. Ruhollah Khomeini was his student. He was Marjaʿ.
- Kashif al-Ghita - he was the leader and great Marjaʿ of Shia.
- Muhammad Hasan al-Najafi - he authored Javaher al-kalam Fi sharh-e Sharay-e al-Islam and was a leader of the Najaf seminary.
- Murtadha al-Ansari - considered the founder of modern Shii jurisprudence, he was the leader of Najaf seminary after the death of Muhammad Hasan al-Najafi. He has been called "first effective" Marjaʿ of the Shia or "the first scholar universally recognized as supreme authority in matters of Shii law".
- Seyyed Hossein Borujerdi - his popular students included Imam Khomeini, Hossein Vahid Khorasani, Sayed Ali Khamenei, Sayyid Ali Sistani, Lotfollah Safi Golpaygani, and Dr. Seyed Ali Mirlohi Falavarjani. Borujerdi was the sole marja "in the Shia world" from 1945-6 until his death in 1961. Borujerdi was the first Marja who attempted Islamic unity. He sent Sayyid Muhaqqiqi to Hamburg, Germany, Aqa-e-Shari'at to Karachi, Pakistan, Al-Faqihi to Medina and Musa al-Sadr to Lebanon.
- Muhammad Husayn Tabataba'i - he authored Tafsir al-Mizan and he was one of the most prominent Intellectuals of philosophy and contemporary Shia Islam. He was an expert in philosophy in Islam. His philosophy is focused upon the sociological treatment of human problems. His book, Shi'ite Islam, was translated into English by Hossein Nasr and William Chittick as a project of Colgate University. He was interviewed by Henry Corbin.
- Abd al-Husayn Sharaf al-Din al-Musawi - he was one of the greatest Marja in Lebanon. He attempted to bring Shia and Sunni closer.

== See also ==
- Global Imams Council
- Marjaʿ
- Lists of maraji
- Qom Seminary
- Society of Seminary Teachers of Qom
- Isfahan Seminary
