= Mohammad Fazel Lankarani =

Iranian Grand Ayatollah (1931–2007)

Grand Ayatollah Mohammad Fazel Lankarani
- محمد فاضل لنکرانی
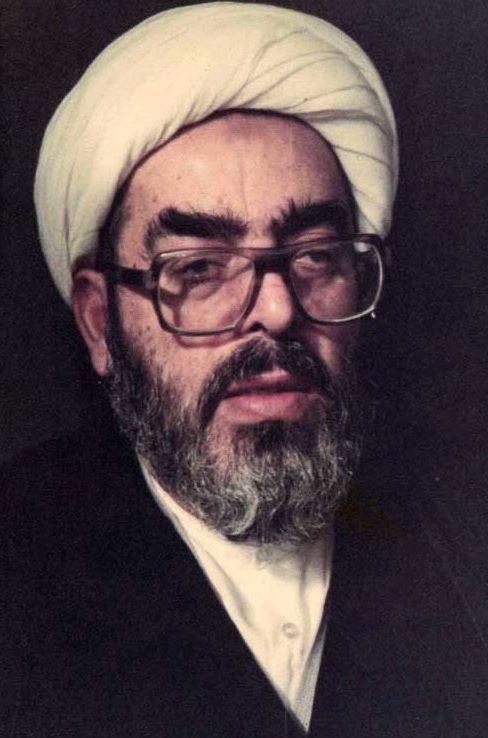
- Lankarani in 1984

Personal life
- Born: 1931 Qom, Imperial State of Iran
- Died: 16 June 2007 (aged 76) Qom, Iran
- Resting place: Fatima Masumeh Shrine, Qom
- Era: Modern era
- Website: lankarani.com

Religious life
- Religion: Islam
- Denomination: Twelver Shi'a
- Jurisprudence: Jaʽfari
- Creed: Usuli
- Profession: Marja'

Muslim leader
- Influenced by: Seyyed Hossein Borujerdi; Ruhollah Khomeini; Muhammad Husayn Tabataba'i

Grand Ayatollah Mohammad Fazel Lankarani (Persian: محمد فاضل لنکرانی; 1931 – 16 June 2007) was an Iranian Twelver Shia Marja'. He was a student of Grand Ayatollah Borujerdi.

== Biography and clerical activities ==
Lankarani was born in Qom, Iran. His father was from Lankaran (now in today's Azerbaijan Republic) who studied in Najaf and Qom and eventually settled in the latter. His mother was a woman of Sayed descent. Lankarani was fluent in Arabic, Talysh, Persian, and Russian.

Lankarani received his ijtihad, the permission of independent interpretation of the legal sources (the Qur'an and the Sunnah), from Ayatollah Boroujerdi at the age of 25. He led prayers at the Fatima Masumeh Shrine in Qom.

Grand Ayatollah Fazel Lankarani was declared as the most knowledgeable specialist in the field of Islamic law (Marja al-taqlid) by the central Shi'a school of religious studies in Qom, Hawza 'Ilmiyyah, after the death of Ayatollah Khomeini. At the time of his death, he was one of seven Grand Ayatollahs in Iran. His Resalah, the book including his interpretation of Islamic laws on different topics, is available in Arabic, English, Persian, Turkish, and other languages. Lankarani taught in the areas of the interpretation of Islamic law (fiqh) and Usul al-fiqh for the last 25 years of his life.

As a Shia Grand Ayatollah, he received generous contributions from his many followers. According to author Hooman Majd "one of Lankarani's aides" told him that "approximately ten million dollars a month flows" into Lankarani's treasury "from his supporters alone."

Fazel Lankarani was a strong supporter of Ayatollah Khomeini, being jailed several times and exiled once during the Pahlavi era. After the 1979 Iranian Revolution, he was a member of the Assembly of Experts, Iran's leading religious body.

As his health conditions deteriorated he moved from the holy city of Qom to Tehran and then to London to receive medical treatment. On Friday 15 June 2007 he moved to Qom and he died on Saturday 16 June 2007.

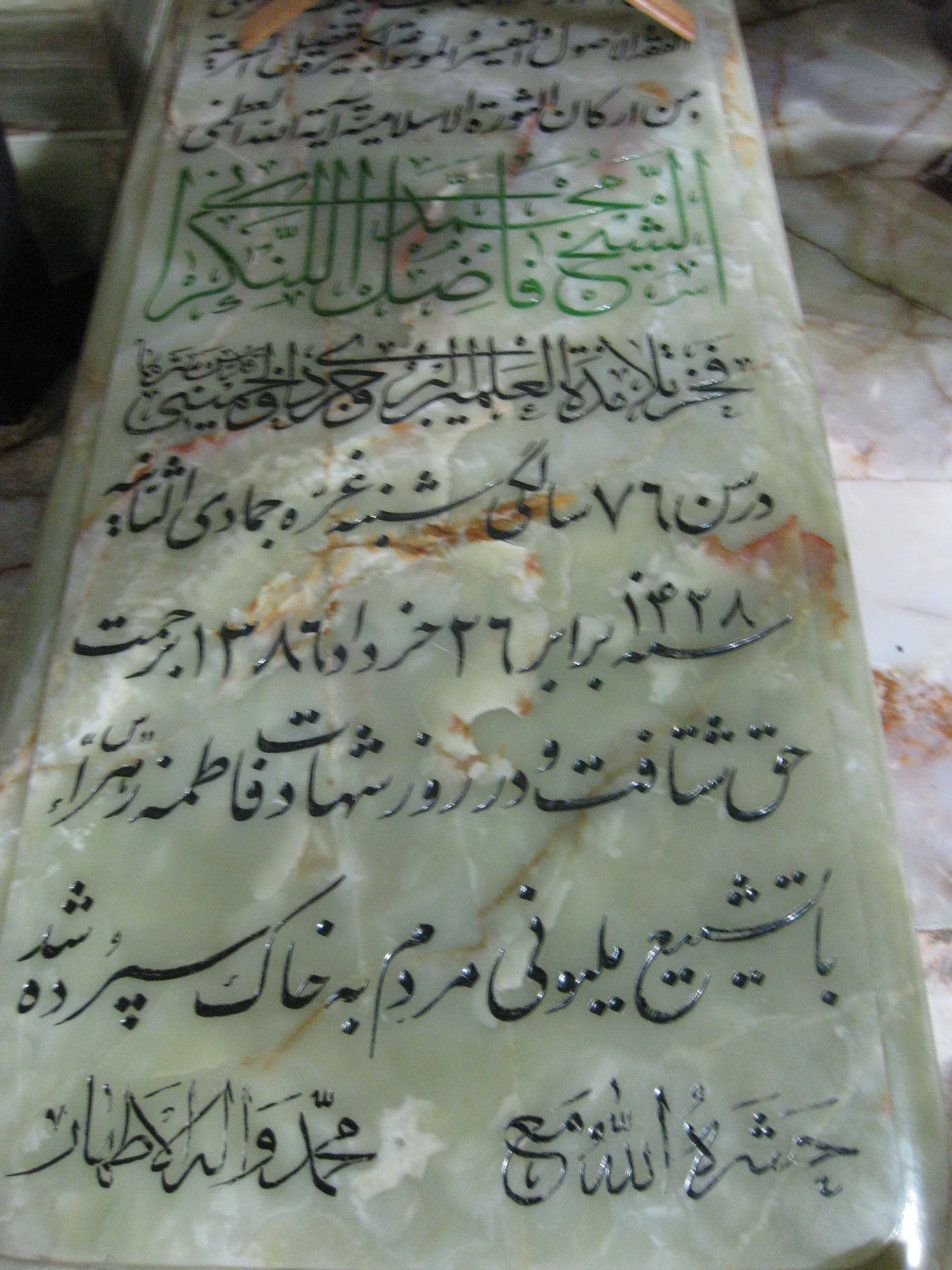
Grave of Ayatollah Fazel lankarani in Fatima Masumeh Shrine

== Views and fatwas ==
Politically, Lankarani followed the traditions of the Islamic Republic in criticizing western corruption in the Islamic world.

Fazel Lankarani supported Ayatollah Khomeini's fatwa calling for the death of Salman Rushdie following the publication of The Satanic Verses in 1989 and called on Muslims to kill that author. He (along with some other senior clerics) continued to call the killing of Rushdie a "duty" for all Muslims although the Iranian government itself ceased to do so in a 1998 compromise with the British government. In 1998, Lankarani called for the Iranian government to do "its utmost" to protect Shiites in Afghanistan, then reportedly endangered by the Taliban.

Lankarani also issued a fatwa calling for the deaths of another author, Rafiq Tağı, an Azeri writer, and Tagi's editor, Samir Sədaqətoğlu, who were accused of criticizing Islam. Tagi's writings sparked recent demonstrations outside the Azerbaijani embassy in Tehran. Possibly related to the fatwa, Rafiq Tağı died in a Baku hospital on 19 November 2011, after having been stabbed with a knife seven times in public.

Lankarani believed strongly in the separation of sexes and opposed President Ahmadinejad's declaration that women have the right to attend soccer matches at stadiums despite the fact that they would see male soccer players. He "famously refused for weeks" to meet with President Ahmadinejad in early 2007 after the president attempted to open soccer events to women. Lankarani was also staunchly opposed to Iran joining CEDAW. When the parliament (the Iranian Majles) was going to debate the signing and ratification of CEDAW, he announced that joining CEDAW and moving toward gender equality would contradict Islamic values.

He is one of the Ulama signatories of the Amman Message, which gives a broad foundation for defining Muslim orthodoxy.

== See also ==
- Lists of maraji
- List of ayatollahs
- List of members in the First Term of the Assembly of Experts
