= Karbalaei =

Karbalaei may refer to:

- a demonym denoting a native or inhabitant of Karbala
- a title which is originally given to a Shia Muslim person who has successfully completed a pilgrimage to Karbala.
- Karbalaei (surname)
