= Khasi dar Miqat =

Travelogue by Jalal Al-e Ahmad

- Author: Jalal Al-e Ahmad
- Original title: خسی در میقات
- Language: Persian
- Subject: Al-e Ahmad's hajj
- Genre: Travelogue
- Published: 1966 or 67
- Publication place: Imperial State of Iran

Khasī dar Mīqāt (Persian: خسی در میقات, lit. 'a straw at the miqat') is a travelogue by Jalal Al-e Ahmad in which he recounts his 1964 (1343 SH) Hajj pilgrimage. Khasī dar Mīqāt received almost unanimously positive reviews from critics.

== Title's meaning ==
Dehkhoda Dictionary provides various meanings for the words khas and mīqāt. Among them, the closest to the meaning of the book's title—considering its content—is as follows: khas means a base or ignoble person, and mīqāt means the place where Hajj pilgrims put on the ihram garment.Therefore, the phrase Khasī dar Mīqāt expresses the idea that Jalal, during the Hajj rituals, saw himself as a worthless being—something that in a way reflects his mystical outlook toward this religious ceremony.

== Publication ==
This travelogue was written in Persian and was initially composed under the title Gozārī be Badavīyat - Badavīyat-e Motorīzeh (Persian: گذاری به بدویت - بدویت موتوریزه, lit. 'transition to primitivism - motorized primitivism'), but after certain omissions, it was published in 1966 or 67 (1345 SH) (Note: Since the year 1345 SH covers parts of the two years 1966 and 1967 AD, and because no document stated the month or season in which the book was published in 1345, it was therefore written as "1966 or 67".)under its current title by Nīl Publications.

In the year 1402 SH (2023 or 2024 AD), Mohammad-Hossein Dana'i—Jalal Al-e Ahmad's maternal nephew—published the book rāz-e hajj-e Jalāl (Persian: راز حج جلال, lit. 'the secret of Jalal's hajj'), which was written in Persian. Centered on two print editions from 1345 and 1346 SH by Nīl Publications, it included Al-e Ahmad's deletions from Khasī dar Mīqāt, along with Jalal's related notes and letters, and sketches of various sites of the journey that were apparently drawn by Al-e Ahmad. The book was published in Tehran by Roshdīye Publications in a volume of 396 pages.

== Content summary ==
Khasī dar Mīqāt, without a preface, introduction, or epilogue, is a collection of Jalal's daily notes from his Hajj pilgrimage during the 24-day period from Friday, Farvardin 21 to Sunday, Ordibehesht 13 of the year 1343 (April–May 1964). The book has no chapters or sections; the author has written his material under the headings of various days, sometimes writing multiple times in a single day and, for example, continuing his travelogue with a heading such as "Noon of the same day".

The travelogue, which begins at Mehrabad Airport, recounts the journey step by step: from the situation inside the airplane to arrival in Jeddah, and from there to the pilgrims' lodging and their various incidents, as well as Jalal's own curiosities. Al-e Ahmad, who at times speaks of the attentiveness of their group's mujtahid regarding the religious rites of Hajj, and sometimes goes to the mosques and other places in Mecca and Medina, occasionally narrates the story of a pilgrim who, in the Arabian heat, refused to take off his wool shirt—causing everyone to suspect that he had hidden money in it. At other moments he talks about Aramco and the oil contracts between Saudi Arabia and the United States, and elsewhere brings up the smallness of human beings within existence. Al-e Ahmad maintains the particular structure of his travelogue until the end, and on Sunday, Ordibehesht 13, in Tajrish, he finishes it by writing the final note.

== Critical reception ==
Khasī dar Mīqāt received almost unanimously positive reviews from critics. Donne Raffat of The New York Times, in his review of the English translation of the book (Occidentosis: A Plague from the West), described it as one of Al-e Ahmad's "finest" works. Mohammad-Hossein Dana'i from the Hamshahri newspaper counts Khasī dar Mīqāt among Al-e Ahmad's outstanding works and describes its text as clear and fluent. He considers one of the characteristics of Jalal's writing style in this book to be the brevity of expressions and the removal of rhetorical additions and even verbs, and he describes the author's depiction of the events of his journey as precise. Rasul Jafarian considers Jalal a "professional" writer in the travelogue genre, and describes the writing of Khasī dar Mīqāt as clear, honest, and enchanting. In his view, Khasī dar Mīqāt is a book worth reading, and since it "contains countless details about the everyday life of Saudis and pilgrims", it is exceptional. Ahmad Mirzadeh of the Nationwide Khorasan newspaper believes that Al-e Ahmad's writing style in Khasī dar Mīqāt has reached maturity; in his view, with this book the author has "breathed new life" into the travelogue genre.Ali Shariati, in his book Hajj, refers to Al-e Ahmad's attention to detail in Khasī dar Mīqāt. According to Shariati, when the travelogue reaches Al-e Ahmad's narration of the Sa'y between the two hills of Safa and Marwa, "his Khasī dar Mīqāt becomes Kasī dar Mīād" (Persian: کسی در میعاد, romanized: Kasī dar Mīād, lit. 'a person at the appointed meeting'). Shariati describes that section with mystical language. Abdolali Dastgheib, writing in Keyhan-e Farhangi, points to Jalal's fresh perspective on the events of the journey and to the non-clichéd nature of the travelogue's text, adding that the author "takes the reader along with him on both an inner and an outer journey". Behzad Gharavi of the Ayandegan newspaper called the travelogue "a post-journey will and testament". In his view, the author has combined certain stylistic features of classical Persian texts with the modern writing style of that language, and has written the book's text in a concise and imagistic manner.

== See also ==
Safarnāma, a similar book by Nasir Khusraw
