= The Ahlulbayt Global Information Center =

Shi'a organization

The Ahlulbayt (a.s.) Global Information Center is an organization under the supervision of the office of Grand Ayatollah Ali al-Sistani.

== Goals ==
Its goal is "to spread the Shi`ite culture through the web and create a kind of strong relation between the theological class and the public".

To reach above aim, they concentrate on:

1. Quick responses to religious questions.
2. Access to a data bank containing thousands of theological Q & A.
3. Directly linking you to the prominent scholars of Qom.
4. Access to a data bank containing information on sectarian differences between the Sunni & Shia faiths.

== History ==
The organization was founded in the spring of 1998, on the anniversary of Eid al-Ghadeer, by Sistani's son-in-law "in a small building" in holy Shi'a city of Qom, a scholarly center of Shi'a Islam

== Sites ==
They operate though various internet websites, including:

- al-shia.org

"available in no less than 27 languages, boasting huge archives, everything translated by a group of students, native speakers, in Qom. There are Afghans, Tajiks, Russians, northern Africans; they have been transferring all Shi'ite textbooks online for three years now. Zadeh says this is considered the number one Shi'ite website, and number seven among all Muslim websites. It has an average of 250,000 visits a month, from as many as 133 countries."

- holynajaf.net
- sistani.org
- Quran.al-shia.org, "only about the Koran, the whole book translated in 27 languages, plus interpretations"
- balaghah.net, with a collection of Imam Ali's sayings in 22 languages.

== See also ==
- Ahlul Bayt Digital Islamic Library Project
- Rafed Network for Cultural Development
