= Mohammad Sadeq Rouhani =

Iranian Grand Ayatollah (1926–2022)

Grand Ayatollah Sayyid Muhammad-Sadiq Rohani
- سيد محمدصادق حسينى روحانی
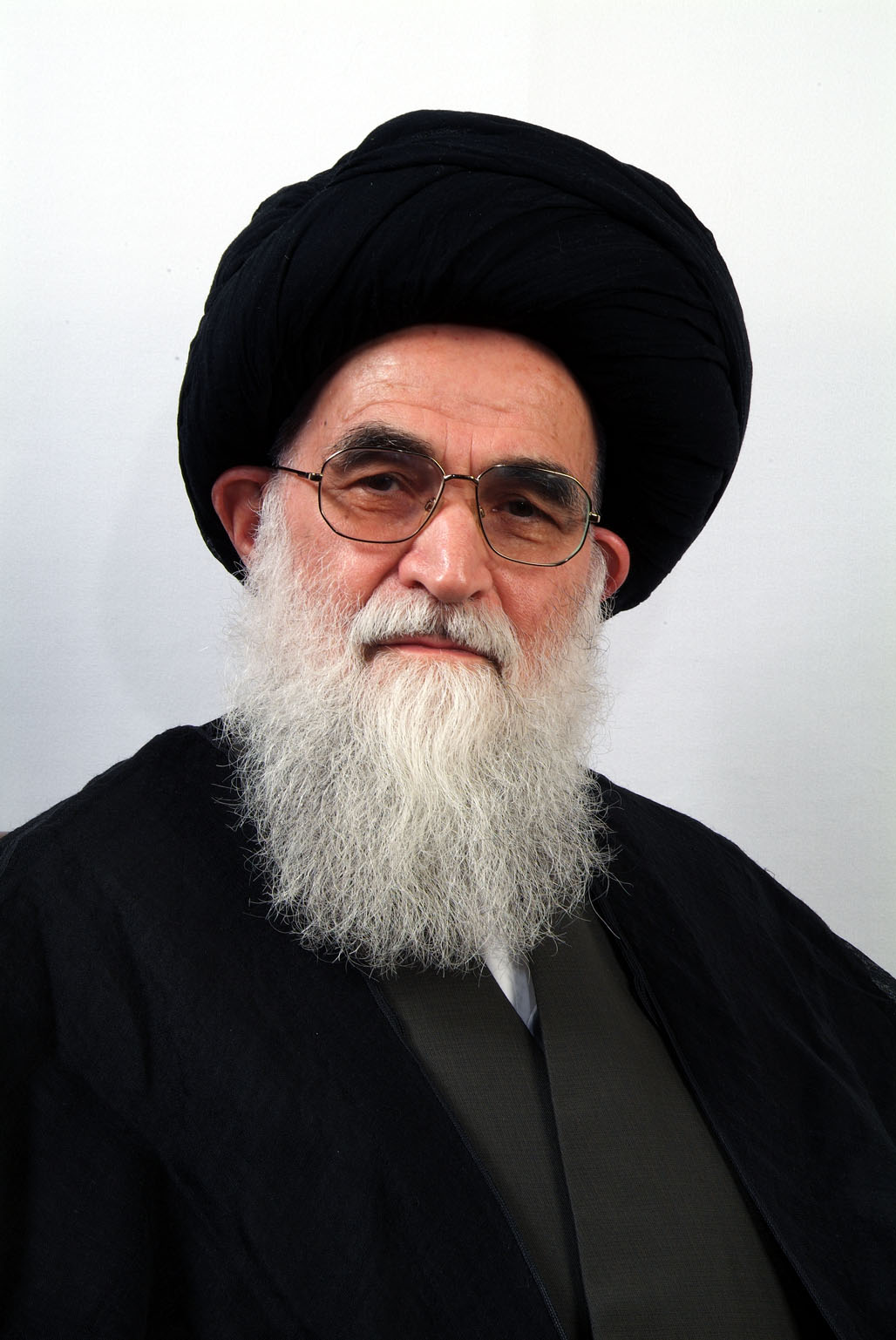
- Rouhani in 2006
- Title: Grand Ayatollah

Personal life
- Born: 16 July 1926 Qom, Imperial State of Iran
- Died: 16 December 2022 (aged 96)
- Parent: Mahmoud Rohani (father)
- Relatives: Mohammed Rohani Brother; Mahdi Hosseini Rohani Cousin
- Website: http://www.rohani.ir/

Religious life
- Religion: Usuli Twelver Shia Islam

Senior posting
- Based in: Qom, Iran
- Period in office: 1961–2022
- Predecessor: Hossein Borujerdi

Grand Ayatollah Sayyid Muhammad-Sadiq Husayni Rohani (Persian: محمد صادق حسینی روحانی; 16 July 1926 – 16 December 2022) was an Iranian Shia marja'.

Rohani resided in Qom. He claimed to have gained ijtihad from the grand Ayatollah Abu al-Qasim al-Khoei, at the age of 14. He announced his marja'iyya after the death of grand Ayatollah Hossein Borujerdi, at the age of 35.

Rohani was one of the first senior clerics to be placed under house arrest under direct order from grand Ayatollah Ruhollah Khomeini just a few years after the Iranian revolution. Rohani was for a time a critic of the Iranian government.

== Early life and education ==
Rohani was born on 16 July 1926, to Sayyid Mahmoud Rohani (d. 1961), a renowned instructor in the Islamic seminary of Qom. It is believed that his father was the person who convinced Sheikh Abd al-Karim al-Haeri to move to the city of Qom and establish the seminary there.

His mother was the daughter of Sayyid Ahmed Tabatabei Qomi, an Imam of the Fatima Masumeh Shrine. His brother, Muhammad Rohani (d. 1997), was also a grand Ayatollah.

=== Education ===
Rouhani started his religious education at the age of four. He completed his muqadamat (introductory studies) by ten, and moved to Najaf. He studied in Najaf for sixteen years and returned to Qom in 1950. When he entered Qom, he began teaching jurisprudence and principles of jurisprudence in the courtyard of the Masumeh shrine. Some of his prominent teachers include: Sheikh Kadhim al-Shirazi, Sheikh Muhammad-Husayn al-Isfahani, Sheikh Muhammad-Ali al-Kadhimi, Sayyid Abu al-Hasan al-Isfahani and Sayyid al-Khoei.

== Relationship with al-Khoei ==
Al-Milani has been reported to be very close with al-Khoei, and studied under him for fifteen years. Ayatollah Zadeh Milani has said “al-Khoei once said to my father Ayatollah al-Milani: I take pride in the Islamic Seminary in which an eleven year old studies alongside the elder students and learned scholars, and with reads makaseb (a compilation by Morteza Ansari that is taught in Islamic seminaries) and understands the contents better than them and further analyses it”. The eleven year old he refers to is Rohani.

Rohani also claimed to own a letter written by al-Khoei praising him whilst he was at the age of fifteen.

Both Rohani and Khoei issued fatwas against the purchase, sale and reading of the writings of prominent academic Ali Shariati.

== Relationship with the Islamic Republic ==
At first, Rouhani, like most other conservative clerics, was the follower of the Islamic Revolution as in 1975, Rohani stood by Khomeini and condemned the Rastakhiz party, by issuing a fatwa against the party. In 1980, he warned the ruler of Bahrain to govern in conformance with Islamic principles or face popular overthrow, and then later stood with the Iranian backed revolution in Bahrain, led by Hadi al-Modarresi, stating "Iran may claim Bahrain again if Iraq continues claiming the three islands in the Gulf".

Rouhani was so against the idea of Montazeri being declared Khomeini’s successor that he publicly declared Ayatollah Khomeini's government to be un-Islamic. He believed that a successor should be chosen by divine powers rather than an ulema of clerics. Rouhani was one of the first senior clerics to be placed under house arrest under a direct order from Ayatollah Khomeini just a few years after the Iranian revolution.

In the year 1985, Hussein-Ali Montazeri was selected as the deputy Supreme Leader by the Assembly of Experts, to which Rouhani objected and said "the supreme religious leader of an Islamic state should not be selected by an assembly of other clerics, but rather chosen by divine powers." Rouhani was so angry at the selection of Montazeri that he publicly declared Khomeini's government un-Islamic, armed security forces immediately attacked his house in the middle of the night and he was put under house arrest for 15 years.

Rouhani's Hajj Mollah Sadegh School in Qom was confiscated by the state after he was put under house arrest in 1995. His home was attacked again in 1995 after he had published a letter to President Rafsanjani in which he openly criticized certain governmental policies. His books and parts of his writings were confiscated and his youngest son, Javad, was arrested and later sentenced to three years imprisonment. Furthermore, Rohani was pledged “not to continue as a ‘Source of Emulation’ for his seven million followers and not to have any visitors.”

After the fall of Saddam Hussein, Rouhani attempted to relocate to Iraq but was barred from leaving the country. His brother Muhammad was arrested in 1994 for insisting that the role of the clergy should be a social, not a political one and criticizing the regime for discrediting Islam. Muhammad died in 1997. A third brother, Mehdi Rohani, died in Paris in 2000.

=== Syria ===
As a result of contact with forces affiliated with Hezbollah, Rohani in later years once more became active politically. One effect of this was his issuing of a fatwa approving of Iranian intervention in the Syrian civil war, describing it as a jihad and labelling those killed in it as martyrs. This led to the opening of official registration sites in Iran, where people could volunteer to participate in the war.

== Death ==
Rouhani died on 16 December 2022, at the age of 96. He served for 61 years as Marja. Iranian leader Ayatollah Ali Khamenei issued his condolences to the family, students, and followers of Ayatollah Rouhani on the occasion.

== Works ==
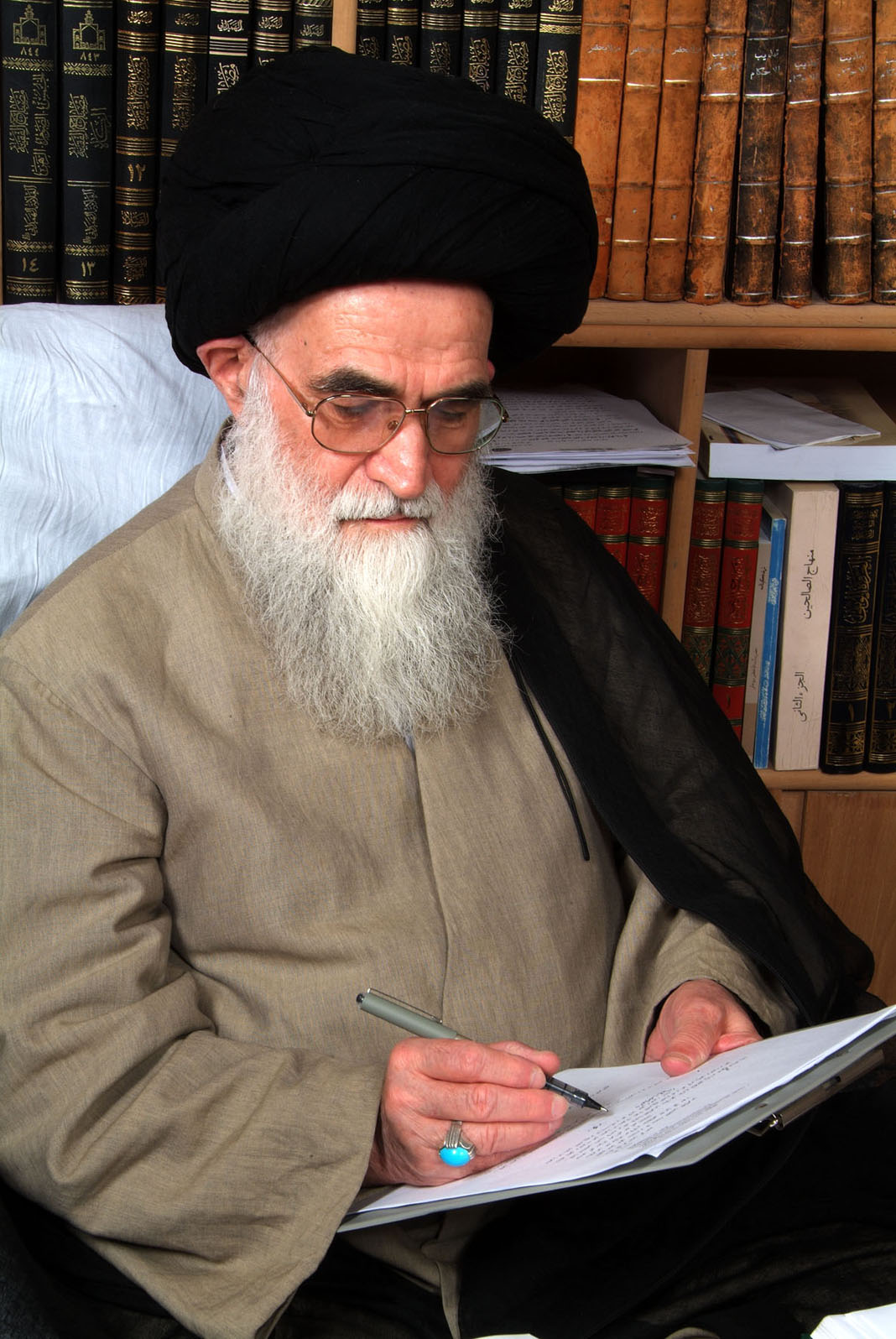
Rohani in his library in Qom

Rohani owned a large library of publications of his own. His most renowned work is Fiqh al-Sadiq (Jurisprudence of al-Sadiq) which comes in 41 volumes. Other books include:

- Zobdat al-Usool (The Essence of Principles of Jurisprudence), 6 volumes.
- Minhaj al-Fuqaha (The Way of the Jurists), 6 volumes.
- al-Masa’il al-Mostahdetha (Renewed Islamic Questions)
- Ta’liq Minhaj al-Salihin (Commentary on Minhaj al-Salihin), 3 volumes.
- Ta’liq 'Urwat al-Wuthqa (Commentary on Urwat al-Wuthqa), 2 volumes.
- al-Jabr wa al-Ikhtiyar (Coercion and Freedom)
- Manasik al-Hajj (Hajj Rituals)
- al-Masa’il al-Montakhiba (Chosen Questions)
- al-Ijtihad wal-Taqleed (Ijtihad and Following)
- Alf Su'al wa Jawab (A Thousand Questions and Answers)
- al-Tahara (Purity)
- Fadha'il Wa Masa'ib Fatima Zahra (Merits and Tragedies of Fatimah)
- Ashura Wa Qiyam al-Imam al-Husayn (Ashura and the Rise of Husayn)

== See also ==
- Ali al-Sistani
- Abu al-Qasim al-Khoei
- Abdollah Javadi Amoli
- Muhammad Hossein Naini
- Muhammad Kazim Khurasani
- Mirza Husayn Tehrani
- Abdallah Mazandarani
- Mirza Ali Aqa Tabrizi
- Mirza Sayyed Mohammad Tabatabai
- Seyyed Abdollah Behbahani
- Hossein Borujerdi
- Hussein-Ali Montazeri
- Mahdi Hosseini Rohani
