= Global Imams Council =

Islamic non-governmental organization

Global Imams Council (GIC)
- Founded: 2014
- Type: Non-Governmental Organization (NGO)
- Headquarters: Najaf, Iraq
- Location: Najaf, Iraq; Tbilisi, Georgia; Toronto, Canada
- Key people: Mohammad Tawhidi (Vice President); Abdul Khabeer Azad (Senior Advisor for Pakistan); Syed Mudassir Shah (Director in Pakistan)
- Affiliations: Official emissary of Najaf's Supreme Islamic Seminary (Hawza Najaf)
- Website: https://imams.org

The Global Imams Council (GIC) is a non-governmental organization (NGO) comprising Islamic leaders from all denominations and schools of thought. The GIC's stated mission is to promote mainstream Islamic teachings founded upon the principles of the Quran and the sunnah, in line with the directives of prominent Islamic seminaries and scholarly consensus. The GIC is the official emissary of the Hawza of Najaf, also known as al-Hawza Al-Ilmiyya and Najaf Seminary: an Islamic seminary in Najaf, Iraq. Najaf Seminary officially authorizes the GIC to issue statements and documentation on its behalf. The Council has offices in Najaf, Iraq, Tbilisi, Georgia, and as of 2024, in Toronto, Canada. The Council has active representation in France, the UK, the UAE, and elsewhere.

== Mission ==
The GIC's stated mission is to encourage interfaith dialogue, promote peace and unity, and address contemporary challenges for the Muslim world through responsible leadership. The Council's mission includes countering extremist ideologies and advocating for the rights of minorities. The GIC's objectives as outlined in their constitution:

- advocate for peaceful coexistence, dialogue, tolerance, mutual respect, human rights, and the building of bridges between all religious communities.
- provide a global representation of Islam and Muslims.
- advocate against terrorism and extremist ideologies.
- provide advice on all matters concerning and related to Islam and Islamic communities.
- counter hate directed towards all religious groups and religious minorities.
- serve Muslim communities in most areas of life.
- issue reliable fatwas concerning contemporary and or developing jurisprudential issues.
- support organizations, groups, and individuals with common objectives and visions.

== History ==
The GIC was established in 2014 by a small coalition of Sunni and Shi'a clerics in Iraq, united to combat the ongoing onslaught of the Islamic State (IS), which emerged in the power vacuum created by the removal of Saddam Hussein.

In the wake of the occupation of Iraqi cities by IS militants, the Iraqi government called on imams to combat the spread of IS ideology and Islamist propaganda. Imams began traveling around Iraq to offer provisions, services, and ideological sustenance to the Iraqi army and local communities.

Since then, the GIC has grown to represent over 1,500 imams, who engage with dozens of diverse communities around the world.

== Ecumenical role and partnerships ==
The GIC established its Interfaith Network, composed of influential leaders. The first to join the Network was Sattar Jabbar Hilow, the global religious leader of Sabean Mandeans, followed by numerous other prominent religious leaders, including Prince Gharios El Chemor, Archbishop Thomas Schirrmacher, Archbishop Malkhaz Songulashvili, and Rabbi Elie Abadie of the United Arab Emirates.

The GIC is also the only council with the authority to propose fatwas to the Islamic Fatwa Council (IFC), a non-governmental body of Shiite, Sunni and Sufi clerics headquartered in the Iraqi spiritual capital of Najaf. The GIC was the driving force behind the first and only fatwa against Hamas, which is binding in courts across the Muslim world. The unprecedented declaration states that Hamas, an offshoot of the Muslim Brotherhood movement, "bears responsibility for its own reign of corruption and terror against Palestinian civilians within Gaza" and deems "it prohibited to pray for, join, support, finance or fight on behalf of Hamas."

In 2021, the GIC was recognized by U.S. Special Envoy Elan Carr in the United States Commission on International Religious Freedom's annual report for adopting the IHRA definition of antisemitism. In 2022, Ambassador Deborah Lipstadt, U.S. Special Envoy to Monitor and Combat Antisemitism, also commended the GIC for its commitment to this definition.

In 2022, the GIC participated in the Conference of European Rabbis in Munich, Germany, to discuss collaborative approaches for navigating post-conflict scenarios.

In 2024, GIC representatives participated in National Prayer Breakfasts in Washington, D.C., and Ottawa, Canada, discussing international religious freedom and fostering interfaith relations. During a Peace Iftar in Paris, the GIC addressed over 350 religious leaders and officials to promote peace and unity. Additionally, the GIC worked with the Inter-Parliamentary Coalition for Global Ethics to develop peace-focused curricula and support ethical governance initiatives.

== Advocacy work ==
The GIC's efforts have been recognized by various governments and international organizations. The Council has received awards and commendations for its work in advancing peace and countering extremism.

In December 2022, the GIC took part in the First Annual Abraham Accords Global Leadership Summit, a gathering of world Leaders, ambassadors, diplomats, entrepreneurs, lawmakers, academics, and clergy from over thirty countries. This event focused on new ways to increase peace and tolerance in the spirit of the Abraham Accords. In conjunction with the parties of the UN's Inter-Parliamentary Commission on Global Ethics, the GIC has taken a leadership role in the development of the educational curriculum that will accompany the Abraham Accords.

In the United Arab Emirates the GIC was received by the UAE’s Grand Ayatollah Khaqani in the capital of Abu Dhabi, alongside the leader of the Islamic Seminary in Iraq (Hawza). The GIC also spoke at the UAE’s Islam and Human Fraternity Conference on a panel preceded by virtual remarks from Pope Francis and a statement by his deputy.

In July 2024, the Global Imams Council signed a memorandum of understanding with TRENDS Research and Advisory, a UAE-based think tank headed by Dr. Mohammed Abdullah Al-Ali. The agreement states the two organizations will “strengthen relations” and “leverag[e] mutual expertise in policy and research.”

On July 10, 2024, the Global Imams Council bestowed an award on TRENDS Research and Advisory during a ceremony held in Abu Dhabi in recognition of TRENDS’ outstanding research efforts in combating extremist ideologies and promoting a culture of peace and tolerance.

In 2024, the GIC’s Vice President spoke on a panel at the World Economic Forum, delivering a keynote address focused on creating a Peace Curriculum for the nations that signed the Abraham Accords.

At the same year, the UK House of Lords engaged with international policymakers to reinforce the Abraham Accords and support peace initiatives, while the Islam and Human Fraternity Conference in Abu Dhabi brought together Pope Francis and other religious leaders to discuss the study of Islam. The GIC participated in the Abraham Accords Global Leadership Summit to develop a Peace Curriculum and partnered with the Inter-Parliamentary Coalition for Global Ethics to promote ethical governance and peace-focused Islamic education.

The GIC’s rejection of extremism, Islamism, and terrorism has drawn the ire of terrorist groups and extremist organizations, including the Islamic State, Muslim Brotherhood, and the Islamic Revolutionary Guard Corps. These groups have threatened members of the GIC, attempted to interfere with the operation of the council, and have launched campaigns to delegitimize the organization, calling into question the credentials of its top Imams, even those ordained by the preeminent seminaries in the Middle East. This has kept the GIC out of the public eye for some time. Recently, increased diplomatic activity has required the GIC and its leadership to take more visible public positions.

=== Pakistan ===
GIC has also expanded its reach in Pakistan through collaboration with international bodies and local clerics and diplomats like Imam Abdul Khabeer Azad and Imam Syed Mudassir Shah.

Imam Abdul Khabeer Azad is the GIC’s Senior Advisor for Pakistan, a prominent diplomat, and the head of the Pakistani council of Muslim Scholars, the Ruet-e-Hilal Committee (Moon-Sighting Committee), and the Badshahi Mosque (the largest Mosque in Lahore). Imam Azad is frequently hosted by the President and Prime Minister of Pakistan, which has helped the GIC make inroads into Pakistan’s educational establishment.

Imam Syed Mudassir Shah is Chairman of the Sufi Council and Director of GIC in Pakistan. Imam Shah authored Whispers in The Stones, which documents the history of Pakistani Jews.

=== Iraq ===
The GIC is the official emissary of the ancient Supreme Islamic Seminary in Najaf, Iraq, also known as Hawza Najaf, or al-Hawza Al-Ilmiyya. Najaf Seminary in Iraq, has officially authorized the Global Imams Council (GIC) to issue statements and documentation on its behalf. As a testament to this newly granted authority, the GIC has launched a 128-page Islamic magazine titled The Council, which bears the official seal of the Najaf Seminary.

In August 2022, GIC delegation met with Father Ra'ad Adel, director of all Nineveh Churches, and the first Iraqi to return to Mosul after its liberation from ISIS.

In April 2024, GIC Imams participated in a Jurisprudential Conference alongside the Prime Minister of Iraq and led prayers in Karbala, one of the holiest shrines in the nation.

The Iraqi Ministry of Defence assigned GIC Imams to promote its officers to higher ranks. Imam Sayid Ali al-Musawi and Imam Al-Khozai attended the event in the Holy Shrine of Al-Kadhimayn in the Capital of Baghdad, to officiate the promotion of Lieutenant colonel Ali al-Khozai to the rank of Colonel.

=== Saudi Arabia ===
on January 5, 2023, His Excellency Dr. Muhammad bin Abdul Karim al-Issa, Secretary General of The Muslim World League and President of the Organization of Muslim Scholars, received the Eminent Grand Ayatollah Shaikh Fadhil al-Budairi and Imam Mohammad Tawhidi in Mecca. The meeting revolved around the importance of solidifying the relationship between the Islamic Seminary of Najaf, Iraq, and the religious authorities within Saudi Arabia; as well as the broader Sunni Muslim world.

=== Kosovo ===
The Global Imams Council was received at the Parliament of the Republic of Kosovo, a Muslim-majority country, by Atifete Jahjaga, former President, and Haki Abazi, Member of Parliament and Chairman of the Committee on Foreign Affairs.

=== Georgia ===
The GIC was received by Ayvaz Mardanov, then the Grand Mufti of Eastern Georgia at the Grand Jumah Mosque of the Capital of Tbilisi.

In June 2022, the GIC signed a memorandum of understanding with the Peace Project, led by Archbishop Malkhaz Songulashvili. The Peace Project was envisioned and realized by the Peace Cathedral, which is the oldest Baptist Church in Tbilisi, Georgia.

In March 2023, the GIC opened the Peace Mosque within the Peace Project grounds and led the first prayer service. The GIC issued the Mosque with a license to operate. Imams and clerics serving in the Mosque are appointed by the GIC.

=== Canada ===
On the 18th of April 2023, the leadership of the Global Imams Council held its first Islamic Leadership Meeting in Canada. The event was hosted by The Islamic Center of Montreal, which is among the oldest Islamic organizations in Canada.
