= Bashir al-Najafi =

Pakistani Ayatollah And Marja Al-Taqlid

Grand Ayatollah Basheer al-Najafi آية الله العظمى بشير النجفي
- Title: Grand Ayatollah

Personal life
- Born: 1942 (age 83–84) Jullundur, Punjab, British Raj (Present-day Jalandhar, Punjab, India)
- Website: Official Website

Religious life
- Religion: Usuli Twelver Shi`a Islam

Senior posting
- Teacher: Abu al-Qasim al-Khoei; Mohammad Sadeq Rouhani
- Based in: Najaf, Iraq
- Post: Grand Ayatollah

Grand Ayatollah Sheikh Basheer Hussain Najafi (Arabic: آية الله العظمى بشير النجفي) (born 1942) is a Pakistani Twelver Shia Marja' and one of the Four Grand Ayatollahs of Najaf, Iraq. He was born in Jalandhar, a city in then-British Raj. He resides in Najaf, Iraq & Gujranwala Pakistan now.

== Migration to Pakistan ==
After the partition of British India into the Dominion of India and Dominion of Pakistan in 1947, his family moved to Pakistan and settled in the city of Gujranwala, Punjab. In Gujranwala he had his initial education in religion. He was then able to move to Iraq for studies in the early 1960s. He is one of many individuals from South Asia and one of the few Pakistanis to have ever been elevated to the highest rank of Grand Ayatollah in Shia Islam. He was one year senior to Grand Ayatollah Ali Sistani.

Al Najafi was attacked on 6 January 1999 by a group of armed men, reportedly members of Fedayeen Saddam, while he and members of his seminary were performing religious duties. The attack, which included use of a hand grenade, resulted in the death of three persons and injury to a number of members of the seminary, including the Grand Ayatollah.

== History ==
He is from a family of religious background, born in Jalandhar a city in British India. After the independence of Pakistan in 1947, his family migrated to the city of Lahore in Pakistan.

He undertook his basic religious studies at a religious school in Lahore known as Jamia tul Muntazar. After completing his basic studies there in 1965, in order to further his religious knowledge and to continue his studies in higher Islamic education, he arrived in Najaf-e-Ashraf (the city of Ameer ul Momineen) in Iraq.

In Najaf, he remained with his Dars and Tadrees (studying and teaching), eventually becoming widely considered a Marjah of the Shia world, and since then the routine of Dars-e-Kharij is continuing.

He is one of the Ulama signatories of the Amman Message, which gives a broad foundation for defining Muslim orthodoxy.

He has 3 brothers and one sister. Ayatollah's oldest brother Sheik Maulana Manzoor Hussain Abidi was also a scholar in Lahore who died on 29 June 2014. He was running his main office in the Islamic Republic of Pakistan.

In 2016 he was pictured alongside Abu Mahdi al-Muhandis receiving a briefing on on-going operations in the Third Battle of Fallujah. He is reported as having praised the ongoing successes of Iraqi forces against the Islamic State and proclaimed, "all of Iraq must be cleansed from Daesh terrorists." He also stressed the necessity of protecting public and private property during the Fallujah operation and said, "Members of the security forces and popular mobilization are the pride of the clergy.""Iraqi holy warriors and fighters must have serious will to liberate the remaining areas under the occupation of terrorism and not to give an opportunity for the invasion of this country’s soil."

The head of his office and his son, Sheikh Ali Najafi, also called for the protection of civilians in Fallujah "so they are free the clutches of terrorism with the least harm." He likewise praised "members of popular mobilization who with faith and courage have once again demonstrated to the world and proved that they stand against the enemies with strength and treat innocent humans with kindness and gentleness."

== Hawzah Najaf al Ilmiya Projects ==
The Grand leader of the Shia community, Ayatollah Al-Uzma Sheikh hafiz Basher Hussain al Najafi has initiated different projects to serve the community and religion. Some of these projects are completed while others are not.

=== Completed Projects ===
==== Reconstruction of Hawza Ilmiya Najaf e Ashraf ====
Hawza Ilmiya Najaf e Ashraf, which is the centre of all the madaris, was demolished by Sadaam. Enemies wanted to close down the doors of Ilm e Rasool, and to remove Najaf as the central point of the world of knowledge. For the same reason he demolished the madaris, the historical places, mosques and Imambarghs. To add up all, printing press, bookshops and libraries were burnt down. Only those valuable things were protected which were hidden and buried underground and were covered. He availed the chance, hence he reconstructed the above-mentioned madaris to save the epicenter of Ilm and that the doors of Ilm e Rasool to be opened so that the world and people be benefited from it.

- Jamia tul Najaf known as madrassa Jamia Qalantar.
- Madrassa Abdul Aziz Al Baghdadi.
- Madrassa Al Mahdi
- Madrassa Yazdi.
- Madrassa Lebnaniya (Khanal Mukhazar).
- Madrassa Shubariya Bazurg.
- Madrassa Imam Ali.
- Madrassa Afghaniya (Established by Mudaris Afghani).
- Madrassa Kazmiya known as Sadrul Azam.
- Madrassa Brujardy (Established by Ayatollah Al Uzma Brujardy).
- Madrassa Akhund Al Kubra.
- Madrassa Akhund Al Sughra.
- Madrassa Al Imam Al Sadiq known as Madrassa Shubariya.
- Madrassa Hindiya
- Madrassa Mahdiya Kashif ul Ghita.
- Madrassa Al Kashif ul Ghita.
- Madrassa Al Qizwini.
- Madrassa Dar Ul Abrar.
- Madrassa Dar Ul Mutaqeen.
- Madrassa Al Hussainiya Al Shiraziya.

=== Projects in process ===
He is continuously trying that in South Asia there should be continuity of Marjiat. The following projects are under completion:

1. Madrassa for male students.
2. Madrassa for female students.
3. Hussainian Hall (imambargah): a place for classes and to perform majalis so that students and zawaar from South Asia can pay their respects to Ahle Bayt according to their culture and language.
4. Imam Ali hospital: where free medical treatment shall be provided to students and zawaar (pilgrims) and for this, place has been purchased near baab ul qibla of Imam Ali shrine and it is awaiting construction.
5. Najaf colony Madina tul Ilm: along with the difficulties faced by students, regarding courses, teachers, residence permit from government (iqama), they are also facing accommodation problems. They live in small rented quarters where sometimes rent is raised and sometimes they have to move to another place, and due to this problem many leave the Hawsa without completing the studies. He has obtained permission for the construction of 1000 quarters from the government and the area has been purchased at baab ul qibla of Imam Ali shrine, but is waiting for respectable momineen to sponsor the construction. This project has been included in the map of the colony madrassa for male and female and hussainia is also included.

Beside these in all the parts of South Asia:

- Madrassa to be established as in Najaf e Ashraf.
- Syllabus of Hawza Ilmiya Najaf e Ashraf to be taught all around.
- Construction of mosques and imambargahs in areas of momineen.
- To support ulema when momineen can't afford there expenses and accommodation.

== Works ==
Below are some of Ayatullah Al-Najafi's works:

- Al-Deen Al-Qayim: Rules and Verdicts for worships and interactions - a total of three volumes, it has been translated to English, Urdu and the Gujarati language.
- Following Late Clerics -(multiple issues were published)
- Improving your level in Usool (Murqat al-Usool) - (multiple issues were published
- Laws of Hajj - (published)

-Rules of Modesty (a number of issues were printed)

- 100 Questions Regarding Khums - (published)
- Guidance for the Youth -(published)
- The Laws and Rituals of the Holy Month of Ramadan (multiple issues were published)
- Najaf: the Pioneer for Hawzas around the World - (multiple issues were published).
- The Laws of Taqleed - (multiple issues were published)
- Mustafi Al-Deen al-Qaim -(multiple issues were published)
- A Friendly Guide to the Holy Kaa'ba - (published)
- A Fresh Guide for Muslims in the West - (published)
- Research in Modern Jurisprudence - (published)
- Explaining the features of Usool - (Handwritten)
- The Rules Surrounding Qiblah -(Handwritten)

Rules and Laws of I'tikaf - (Handwritten)

- Justice - (Handwritten)
- Laws of Backbiting - (Handwritten)
- Rules of Correct & Incorrect Guarantees
- Explaining Kifayat Al-Usool - (Handwritten)
- Classifying Narrators - (unfinished)
- An Intensive Paper Regarding the Science of Intellect - (Handwritten)
- Explaining Manthoomat Al-Sibzawari - (Handwritten)
- Reviewing the theme of "Qawaneen (laws) of Usool" - (handwritten)
- The Indian Circle used for Defining Qiblah - (Handwritten)
- Commentary on Sharh Al-Tajreed - (Handwritten)
- Explaining Inheritance in "Luma'ah" - (Handwritten)
- Rules of Radio, Television, and Acting (Handwritten)
- Khums - (Handwritten)
- The Rules of Friday Prayers
- Upholding Traditions for Imam Hussain and the Mourning Ceremony
- Those Who Repent are the Beloved of Allah - multiple issues were published
- Nasabi - a reply to misconceptions brought up by one of the Nasabis (handwritten)
- The Birth of Imam Mehdi - multiple issues were published, translated to Urdu
- A Summarized Edition of Rules & Verdicts - translated into Urdu. (Published)
- For the Youth - (advice and instructions from Ayatollah Al-Najafi to the youth - (multiple issues were published)

== See also ==
- Ali al-Sistani
- Abu al-Qasim al-Khoei
- Muhammad Hossein Naini
- Muhammad Kazim Khurasani
- Mirza Husayn Tehrani
- Abdallah Mazandarani
- Mirza Ali Aqa Tabrizi
- Mirza Sayyed Mohammad Tabatabai
- Seyyed Abdollah Behbahani
