= Risalah (fiqh) =

Treatise on practical Islamic law

Risalah (Arabic: رسالـة) is the Arabic word for treatise. Among the Shia the term is short for a risalah-yi'amaliyyah (Persian: رساله عملیه) or treatise on practical law. These treatises are also known as collections of juridical edicts or clarifications of questions (Arabic: توضيح المسائل). They are usually written by a mujtahid (Note: Among the Shia, a mujtahid is a person generally accepted as an original authority in Islamic law, i.e. an ayatollah.) as part of the process of becoming a Marja'-e-Taqlid, i.e. a Grand Ayatollah. These books contain the cleric's practical rulings on the application of Islam to daily life. They are arranged according to topics such as ritual purity, worship, social issues, business, and political affairs. In considering each application they outline the principles and texts used to reach a specific ruling. They are used by a Marja''s followers to conform their behaviour to their interpretation of Islam.

== See also ==
- Usooli
