= Ahlul Bayt Digital Islamic Library Project =

Non-profit Shi'a organization

The Ahlul Bayt Digital Library Project (Ahlul Bayt DILP) is a non-profit Shi'a organization that features work from a group of international volunteers. It operates the website Al-Islam.org – whose stated objective is to digitize resources related to the history, law, and society of the Islamic religion – with particular emphasis on the Twelver Shi'ah Islamic school of thought. Al-Islam.org also tries to serve as a site for introducing Islam to non-Muslims.

The organization is a 501(c)(3) public charity and was established by volunteers who contributed materials. The DILP and the Al-Islam.org site are supported by individual donors. The Ahlul Bayt DILP stated that it aim is to encourage the research of Islam.

== History ==
The organization was established in 1996.

Since its launch, Al-Islam.org is the top site in Yahoo!'s list of Shia sites by popularity.

== Content ==
The free digital library consists of more than 800 resources in different languages, like Spanish, Italian, Swahili, Arabic, Urdu and Gujarati, contributed by volunteers. The Ahlul Bayt DILP also works on the Shiite Encyclopedia, the Event of Gadeer Khum project, and the Tahrif (distortion) of Islamic texts. While it does not hold the copyrights on the digitized texts, permission was obtained to rectify the material. The multimedia section of Al-Islam.org has a collection of audio and video resources. The Ahlul Bayt DILP's digital library consists of more than 4,000 free resources.

== Projects ==
The Ahlul Bayt DILP team is working on projects, including:

=== The Multilingual Quran ===
The Multilingual Quran section of the DILP is a searchable Quran with English translation as well as commentary from Agha Puya and S.V. Mir Ahmed Ali. It also includes translations and browsing by topic.

=== The Event of the Ghadir Khum project ===
A scholarly examination of the event where Muhammad appointed Imam Ali as his successor. The study focuses on examining the chain of narrators and the tradition of Al-Ghadir.

== See also ==
- The Aalulbayt (a.s.) Global Information Center
