= Muhammad al-Fayadh =

Afghan Grand Ayatollah (1930–2026)

Grand Ayatollah Muḥammad ʾIsḥāq Fayyāḍ محمد اسحاق فیاض

Personal life
- Born: 21 August 1930 Shirdagh, Malistan, Ghazni Province, Afghanistan
- Died: 4 June 2026 (aged 95) Baghdad, Iraq
- Children: 7 (including Maḥmūd al-Fayyāḍ)
- Website: Official Website

Religious life
- Religion: Islam
- Denomination: Twelver Shi'ism
- Jurisprudence: Jaʽfari
- Creed: Usuli

Muslim leader
- Based in: Najaf, Iraq

Grand Ayatollah Muḥammad ʾIsḥāq Fayyāḍ, (Arabic: مُحَمَّد إِسْحَاق ٱلْفَیَّاض, Dari: مُحَمَّداِسحٰاق فَیّٰاض; 21 August 1930 – 4 June 2026) was an Afghan-Iraqi Shia Hazara marja and one of the Big Four, among the most senior Shi'a marja living in Iraq after Ali al-Sistani.

== Biography ==
=== Early life and ancestry ===
Muhammad al-Fayadh belongs to Poladha (Hazara tribe). He was born in Shirdagh Malistan district of Ghazni province, Hazarajat. His family were farmers and he started learning the Qur'an from the village cleric when he was five. When he was 10 his family moved to Najaf, where he studied various Islamic studies including Arabic language, rhetoric, logic, Islamic philosophy, the Hadith and Islamic jurisprudence, eventually studying under Grand Ayatollah Abu al-Qasim al-Khoei. When al-Khoei died in 1992 he supported Ali al-Sistani as the chair of the marjaiya in Najaf.

=== Ba'athist Iraq ===
Under Saddam Hussein he adopted a quietist approach, avoiding politics and confrontation with the government.

=== Role in contemporary Iraq ===
Following the invasion of Iraq by the United States and allies in 2003, al-Fayyad engaged more than any other marja with the occupying American and British military and diplomats, informing them of the views of the senior clerics. He adopted similar positions to al-Sistani and the other marjaiya: supporting a united Shiite slate for the first Iraqi elections; calling for Islam to be the sole source of Iraqi law; supporting a yes vote in the referendum on the constitution; rejecting a secular Iraq; and opposing the adoption of doctrine of the Guardianship of the Islamic Jurist as adopted by the Islamic Republic of Iran.

Al-Fayadh wrote books on topics such as Islamic jurisprudence, Islamic politics, pilgramige rituals, and Islamic banking. A very innovative position of him is written in his book on women's role in society with the title 'Jāyegāh Zan dar Nizām Siyāsīyeh Islām' (English title: 'The position of women in the Islamic political system').

== Positions ==
=== Socio-political role of women in Islamic societies ===
Al-Fayadh was one of the few Islamic Shia Ayatollahs who were in favour of women in positions of political leadership. In June 2018 an article was written on a Persian website, which was later translated into English. There the Islamic position of Ayatollah al-Fayadh concerning the position of women in Islamic society was discussed, citing his book 'Jāyegāh Zan dar Nizām Siyāsīyeh Islām' (English title: 'The position of women in the Islamic political system') on that subject. "In response to some jurisprudential questions concerning the role of women in society, he declared it permissible for women to take any of the three following positions: political leader, judge and religious jurisconsult."

The article continues to explain al-Fayadh's opinion concerning women and the different positions they can take in society: "It is irrespective of whether this is a social position like politics or an individual one like being a driver, a pilot, etc. With this reasoning he believes that in all spheres of life, be it social, individual, ideological, freedom of expression, business, financial trading, land cultivation, etc. women and men are completely equal."

=== Guardianship of the Islamic Jurists ===
Of all the marja'iyya Fayyad is reported to have been the biggest opponent of the concept of the Guardianship of the Islamic Jurist. However, this report is contradicted by the official website of the Shi'a Marja, wherein he remarks, "The correct opinion regarding the issue of "Vilayat-e-Faqih" (Guardianship of the Islamic Jurist) is that this issue requires no external proof, because the continuation of Islamic law, and its application, is dependent upon the continuation of the system of Vilayat". He continues, "The vilayat of the Prophet and the immaculate Imams, and in the time of the major occultation of the 12th Imam, the Islamic Jurist is bestowed with this vilayat ... It is unimaginable that Islamic Law could continue to exist without the continuation of this vilayat". Furthermore, he was one of the Ulama signatories of the Amman Message, which gives a broad foundation for defining Muslim orthodoxy.

== Personal life and death ==
Al-Fayyadh was married and had seven children (three sons and four daughters), including Shaykh Mahmoud al-Fayadh, who served as his representative.

Al-Fayadh died in Baghdad on 4 June 2026, at the age of 95.

== Works ==
=== Works translated into English ===
- A Selection of Islamic Laws (Taudhihul Masae’l) also listed in Persian and Urdu editions

=== Other works ===
- Al-Mabahith al-Usuliyya — studies in the principles of jurisprudence
- Muhadarat fi Usul al-Fiqh — lectures in the principles of jurisprudence
- Ta'aliq Mabsuta ala al-Urwa al-Wuthqa — extended commentary on al-Urwa al-Wuthqa
- Atruhat Fikriyya — intellectual studies
- Minhaj al-Salihin — manual of Islamic law
- Tawdih al-Ahkam bi-Tariqat al-Infographic — Islamic rulings explained through infographics
- Tawdih al-Masa'il — Persian edition of Islamic legal rulings
- Tawdih al-Masa'il — Urdu edition of Islamic legal rulings
- Manasik al-Hajj — Hajj rituals
- Al-Istifta'at al-Shar'iyya — religious questions and answers
- Al-Aradi — lands
- Al-Masa'il al-Mustahdatha — contemporary legal issues
- Al-Bunuk — banks / Islamic banking
- Mawqi' al-Mar'a fi al-Nizam al-Siyasi al-Islami — the position of women in the Islamic political system
- Al-Hukuma al-Islamiyya — Islamic government
- Al-Nazra al-Khatifa fi al-Ijtihad — a brief look at ijtihad
- Ajwibat al-Masa'il al-Tibbiyya — answers to medical questions
- 101 Questions about Writing, Books, and Libraries
- Bayanat wa Tawjihat — statements and guidance
- al-Mukhtasar fi Hayat al-Sayyid al-Khoei — a brief account of the life of Sayyid al-Khoei

== See also ==
- Big Four (Najaf)
- Abu al-Qasim al-Khoei
- Muhammad Hossein Naini
- Muhammad Kazim Khurasani
- Mirza Husayn Tehrani
- Abdallah Mazandarani
- Mirza Ali Aqa Tabrizi
- Mirza Sayyed Mohammad Tabatabai
- Seyyed Abdollah Behbahani
- Fazlullah Nouri
