= Abdul Mahdi al-Karbalai =

Iraqi cleric

Sheikh Abdul-Mahdi al-Salami (Arabic: عبد المهدي السلامي; born 1955), commonly known as Abdul-Mahdi al-Karbalai, is a Shia Muslim scholar, best known for being the official representative of Grand Ayatollah Sayed Ali Al-Sistani in Iraq.

== Role ==
Sheikh Abdul-Mahdi Al-Karbalai is based in Karbala, Iraq approximately 80 km from Najaf, where Grand Ayatollah Sayed Ali Al-Sistani resides. In practice, Sistani never delivers public sermons or speeches, and only releases official statements through Sheikh Abdul-Mahdi Al-Karbalai. The statements are later transcribed and posted on Sistani's official webpage, with the Grand Ayatollah's official stamp, indicating the authenticity of the remarks.

Sheikh Abdul-Mahdi Al-Karbalai is noted for having announced Grand Ayatollah Sistani's famous Fatwa (edict) obligating Iraqis to vote, and with the rise of terrorism, to join the military to oppose ISIS.

== See also ==
- List of maraji
