= Manasik =

Rites for Hajj and 'Umra pilgrims

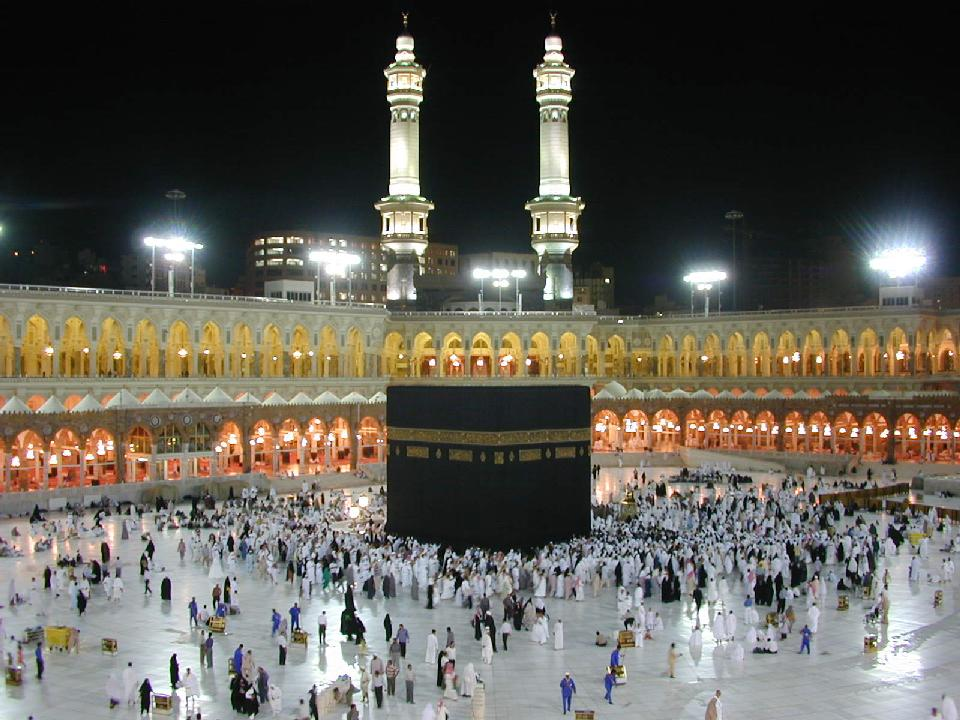
Photo of the Kabba, a holy location for Muslims in Mecca, Saudi Arabia

Manasik (Arabic: مناسك) is the whole of rites and ceremonies that have to be performed by Islamic pilgrims in and around Mecca. The Qur'an differentiates between two manasiks: The Manasik of Hajj, has to be done in the month Dhu al-Hijjah and The Manasik of ʿUmra, which can be performed any time of the year. The knowledge of manasik is an independent part of Fiqh.

== Qur'anic statements ==
The Arabic term mansak or mansik, to which manāsik forms the plural, is nomen loci to the Arabic word nusuk. The term nusuk occurs even in the Qur'an in Sura 2:196, where it refers to a sacrifice that has to be made as a substitute if the pilgrim prematurely cuts his hair. As a nomen loci, the term mansak thus refers to a place of sacrifice. However, it has undergone a change of meaning over time. Even in the Qur'an itself, the term is used for certain sacrificial rites. In this sense, the term already appears in two places in the 22nd Sura named after the Hajj, in verse 34 and verse 67.

In addition, the plural term occurs twice in Quran 2 in connection with pilgrimage. In the first passage, Quran 2:128, Abraham addresses the petition to God to show him and his Muslim offspring the rites (manasik). In the second passage, Sura 2:200, believers are called upon to commemorate the manasik of God, as they had inherited thought of their fathers. The term is already used in the Qur'an for the entirety of the pilgrimage ceremonies.

== History ==
One of the earliest experts in manāsik was the Prophet's Companion Abdullah ibn Umar. From him, it is reported that he alternately went one year to Hajj and the other year to 'Umrah. During the pilgrimage season (mausim) he was then active as Mufti. Together with Abd Allah ibn Abbas he delivered his Fatwa - Sessions on the arrival of the pilgrims.

One of the earliest monographic treatises on the entirety of the pilgrimage rites is the Kitāb al-Manāsik of Qatāda ibn Diʿāma (died 735/6). The first part of this work is preserved in the tradition of his disciple Sa'īd ibn Abī'Arūba (died 773). Later, numerous other Manāsik works were written.

As reported by Christiaan Snouck Hurgronje, who was in Mecca at the end of the 19th century, the Manasik were taught to the pilgrims in their own colleges before the pilgrimage began.

There are several general guidelines for Umrah and Hajj that must be known by pilgrims when in Medina and Mecca wants to do Hajj or Umrah. Things which may not be applied in the country should be done in the Holy Land such as maintaining courtesy towards other people from many countries. We must do this so that our worship is smooth and fervent.

== Exemplary construction of a Manāsik teaching book ==
The following is an example overview of the chapters of the work of Rahmatallāh as-Sindī with the commentary of al-Qārī:

1. Requirements for the Hajj (šara'it al-hajj, page 6).
2. The Duties of Hajj (fara'id al-hajj, p. 21)
3. The Places to Enter the Ihram (al-mawaqit, p. 26)
4. Entry into the state of consecration (al-ihram, p. 31)
5. Entering Mecca (duhul Makka , p. 53)
6. The different types of Tawaf (anwa' al-atwifa, p. 62).
7. Running between Safa and Marwa (as-sa'i baina s-Safa wa-l-Marwa ä, p. 115)
8. The Khutba (al-khutba, p. 89)
9. Standing at Mount Arafat and its rules (wuquf'Arafāt wa-ahkamu-hu, p. 92)
10. The Rules of Muzdalifah (ahkam al-Muzdalifa, p. 106)
11. The sacrificial rites of Minā (manasik minā, p. 111)
12. The Tawaf of the visit (tawaf az-ziyara, p. 116)
13. Throwing the stones and its rules (ramy al-jimar wa-ahkamu-hu, p. 119)
14. The Farewell Circulation (tawaf as-sadar, p. 127)
15. The connection of Hajj and 'Umra (al-qirān, p. 130)
16. The Tamattu (at-tamattu p. 139), a combination of Hajj and 'Umra, in which the pilgrim leaves the state of consecration in between.
17. The connection of two Hajj or 'Umrah pilgrimages (al-jam'bain an-nusukain al-muttahidain, p. 147)
18. Completion of one of the two pilgrimage types (idafat ahad an-nusukain, p. 150)
19. The abrogation of the ihram of Hajj and 'Umra (fash ihram al-hajj wa-l-'umra, p. 152)
20. Violations (al-jinayat, p. 152)
21. The retribution of the offenses and the requisite atonement (jaza' al-jinayat wa-kaffararu-ha, p. 200)
22. The hindrance of the pilgrimage (al-ihsar, p. 219)
23. The passing of the pilgrimage (al-fawat, p. 230)
24. The Execution of the Pilgrimage for a Third Person (al-hajj 'al-ghair, p. 233)
25. the 'Umra (al-'Umra, p. 248)
26. the vow to Hajj or to 'Umra (an-nadr bi-l-hajj wa-l-'umra, p. 251)
27. Sacrificial animals (al-hadaya, p. 254)
28. Miscellaneous (al-mutafarriqāt, page 259). Among other things, the boundaries of the Haram and the ruler's duty to Kaaba's clothing are dealt with.
29. The Visit of the Lord of Messengers (Ziyārat saiyid al-mursalīn, p. 267) in Medina.
