= Qatada ibn Di'ama =

Qatada ibn Di'amah al-Sadusi or Abu Khattab (Arabic: قتادة بن دعامة السدوسي) (died 117 AH/735 AD) was a mufassir and muhaddith who lived in Basra, Iraq.

== Life ==
He came from the clan of Sadus, from the northern Arab tribe of Banu Shayban. Little is known about his life, and the earliest accounts of him were compiled by Ibn Sa'd in his "Book of the Major Classes". He was blind; he relied on his memory in passing on his knowledge in the fields of hadith, tafsir, Arabic poetry and genealogy, which was already considered proverbial in his lifetime. He was a student and a companion of al-Hasan al-Basri for several years. According to some reports mentioned by al-Mizzī and al-Dhahabī in their scholarly biographies, Qatāda died of the plague in Wasit in 117 (Hijri Calendar)/735 A.D.

== Works ==
- His tafsir writings were not preserved. Only a small fragment of three leaves, containing the abrogation of verses from the Koran and documenting the study of the script in Alexandria on the colophon in 1177, is available and was published in 1988: Kitāb an-nāsikh wal-mansūkh / كتاب الناسخ والمنسوخ / The abrogating and the abrogated. In al-Tabari numerous excerpts, specifying the tradition paths obtained from his commentary on the Koran. Both his Koran exegesis as well as his work on the abrogation were known in the 15th century; Ibn Hajar al-'Asqalānī lists them in his "scholarly encyclopedia", in a collection of titles of those works to which he had the tradition of inheritance.
- Kitāb al-manāsik (كتاب المناسك), The book of pilgrimage ceremonies is in the tradition of his pupil Sa'īd ibn Abī'Arūba (died 773) and was first published in 2000 in Beirut. The work contains both explanations of Qatada regarding the ritual aspects of the pilgrimage and its exegesis of those Koranic verses on the pilgrimage ceremonies, their stations and the importance of the al-Haram al-Makki.
