= Ali al-Sistani =

Islamic scholar (born 1930)

Grand Ayatollah Sayyid Ali al-Sistani
- علي السيستاني
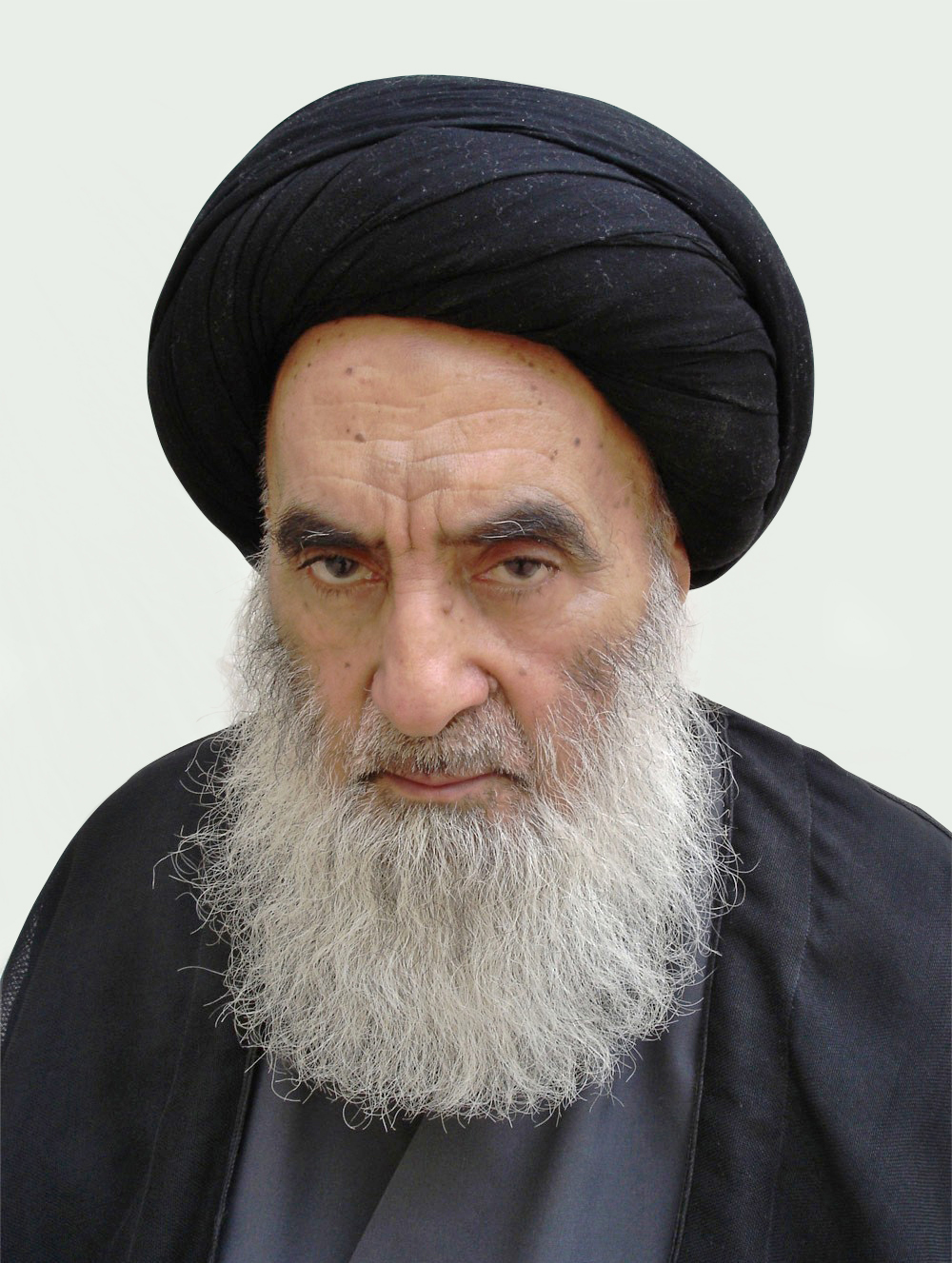
- Sistani in 2009

Personal life
- Born: 4 August 1930 (age 96) Mashhad, Iran
- Children: 2, including Muhammad-Ridha
- Main interest: Religious jurisprudence
- Website: sistani.org

Religious life
- Religion: Islam
- Denomination: Twelver Shia
- Jurisprudence: Jaʽfari
- Creed: Usuli

Muslim leader
- Based in: Najaf, Iraq
- Period in office: 1993–present
- Predecessor: Abd al-A'la al-Sabziwari, Mohammad Fazel Lankarani

Ali al-Husayni al-Sistani (Arabic: علي الحسيني السيستاني; born 4 August 1930) is an Islamic scholar and the dean of the Hawza in Najaf, Iraq. A Grand Ayatollah, Sistani is considered one of the leading religious leaders of Twelver Shia Muslims. After the invasion of Iraq and the subsequent overthrow of the authoritarian Baathist regime, Sistani advocated for democratization instead of the system of Wilayat al-Faqih. He has likewise endorsed rule of law, Iraqi nationalism, non-sectarianism and popular sovereignty. He has been a vocal critic of foreign interference in Iraqi affairs and has warned foreign actors against imposing their will on the Iraqi people.

Born in Mashhad, Iran to a Sayyid family, Sistani studied in Qom under Hossein Borujerdi and later in Najaf under Abu al-Qasim al-Khu'i. An Usuli, Sistani rose to the rank of mujtahid in 1960 and succeeded Abd al-A'la al-Sabziwari as Grand Ayatollah. Sistani was included in top positions of The Muslim 500: The World's Most Influential Muslims from 2004 to 2024 and named one of the 100 most influential people in the world by Time magazine in 2004 and 2005.

== Biography ==
=== Early life and ancestry ===
Sistani was born in 1930 in Mashhad, to a family of religious clerics who claim descent from Husayn ibn Ali, the grandson of Muhammad. His father was Mohammad-Baqir al-Sistani and his mother was the daughter of Ridha al-Mehrebani al-Sarabi. Despite the family surname being "Sistani", the family was not of Sistani Persian origin but of Arab Sayyid origin. The surname derived from his great grandfather, Muhammad al-Husayni, who was appointed as Sheikh al-Islam in Sistan by the last Safavid Shah Hossein and established his residence there. After the 2003 invasion of Iraq, a Sunni Arab tribal delegation visited Sistani, and noted that despite speaking imperfect Standard Arabic with a heavy Persian accent, Sistani made it clear that he was an Arab and that the influence of his Iranian upbringing did not change the fact that he was a Sayyid (Note: A patrilineal descendant of the Islamic prophet Muhammad). The delegation also mentioned that Sistani frequently mentioned the Arab nation and criticized the Velayat-e-Faqih system of Iran.

Sistani began his religious education as a child, first in Mashhad in his father's hawza, and continuing later in Qom. In Qom he studied under Grand Ayatollah Seyyed Hossein Borujerdi. Later in 1951, Sistani traveled to Iraq to study in Najaf under Grand Ayatollah Abu al-Qasim al-Khoei. Sistani rose to the rank of mujtahid in 1960 at thirty-one.

=== Grand Ayatollah ===
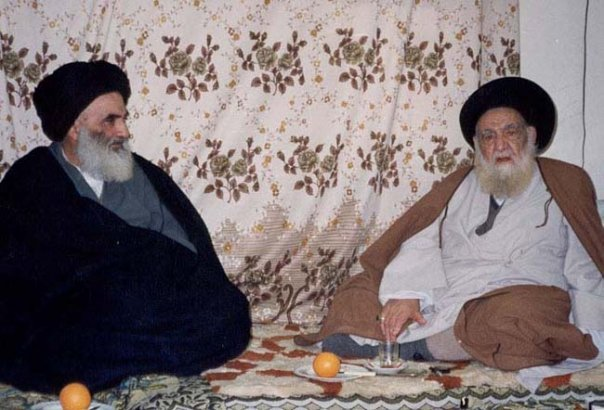
Ali al-Sistani and Abu al-Qasim al-Khoei

When Ayatollah al-Khoei died in 1992, Abd al-A'la al-Sabziwari briefly became the leading marja'. However, when he died in 1993, Sistani ascended to the rank of Grand Ayatollah through formal peer recognition of his scholarship. His role as successor to Khoei was symbolically cemented when he led funeral prayers for Khoei, and he also inherited most of Khoei's network and following.

=== Baath Party ===
During the years of Saddam Hussein's rule of Iraq through the Arab nationalist and Sunni dominated Baath Party, Sistani was untouched during the violent Baathist repression and persecution that killed many clerics including Muhammad al-Sadr in 1999, for which Saddam denied any involvement. Sistani's mosque was forcefully shut down in 1994 and did not reopen until the 2003 American-led invasion of Iraq.

=== Role in contemporary Iraq ===
Since the overthrow of the Baath Party of Iraq in 2003, Sistani has played an increasingly prominent role in regional religious and political affairs and he has been called the "most influential" figure in post-invasion Iraq.

Shortly after the American invasion began, Sistani issued a fatwa advising Shia clergy to become engaged in politics to better guide the Iraqi people toward "clearer decisions" and to fight "media propaganda." As the summer of 2003 approached, Sistani and his followers began petitioning the occupying forces for a constitutional convention. Later, Sistani called for a democratic vote of the people to form a transitional government. Observers described the move as being a path leading directly to Shia political dominance over Iraq's government, as Shia Muslims make up approximately 65% of the total Iraqi population. Subsequently, Sistani criticized plans for an Iraqi government for not being democratic enough.

In early August 2004, Sistani experienced serious health complications related to a previously diagnosed heart condition. He traveled to London to receive medical treatment. It was, reportedly, the first time that Sistani had left Iraq in decades, and may have been due, in part, to growing concerns for his safety from sectarian violence. Though still recovering, Sistani returned later in the month to broker a military truce at the Imam Ali Mosque in Najaf where Muqtada al-Sadr and the Mahdi Army had been cornered by American and Iraqi forces. Sadr, who rose rapidly to prominence through a series of independent military actions beginning in 2004, has since actively challenged Sistani's more progressive influence over Shia in the region.

Sistani's edicts reportedly provided many Iraqi Shia cause for participating in the January 2005 elections—he urged, in a statement on 1 October 2004, that Iraqis recognize the election as an "important matter," additionally, Sistani asked that the elections be "free and fair ... with the participation of all Iraqis." Soon after, Sistani issued a fatwa alerting Shia women that they were religiously obligated to participate in the election, even if their husbands had forbidden them from voting. In an issued statement Sistani remarked that "truly, women who go forth to the polling centers on election day are like Zaynab, who went forth to Karbala."

He has consistently urged the Iraqi Shia not to respond in kind to attacks from Sunni Salafists, which have become common in Sunni-dominated regions of Iraq like the area known as the "Triangle of Death," south of Baghdad. Even after the destruction of the Shia Al-Askari Mosque in Samarra in February 2006, his network of clerics and preachers continued to urge calm and told their followers that "it was not their Sunni neighbors who were killing them but foreign Wahhabis." Sistani's call for unity after the bombing of the mosque helped to control a potentially dangerous situation, preventing the country from entering in a bloody sectarian war. Sistani did the same when the same mosque was bombed again in 2007.

An alleged plot to assassinate Sistani was foiled on 29 January 2007, when three Jund al-Samaa gunmen were captured at a hotel near his office. It is believed to have been part of a larger attack against several targets in Najaf.

In an online open poll 2005, Ali Sistani was selected as the 30th topmost intellectual person in the world on the list of Top 100 Public Intellectuals by Prospect (UK) and Foreign Policy (US).

On 13 June 2014, Sistani appealed that Iraqis should support the government against the Islamic State of Iraq and the Levant militant group, which had taken over Mosul and Tikrit and was threatening Baghdad. Later in June 2014, Sistani revised his statement and issued a fatwa calling for "citizens to defend the country, its people, the honor of its citizens, and its sacred places," against the ISIL.

Sistani said the Iraqi government and police were liable for killing protestors during the 2019–2021 Iraqi protests. He requested that the government prosecute those who gave the command to shoot protesters. The ayatollah rarely voices his opinion on politics except in extreme unrest. The protests have been described as Iraq's worst violence since ISIL was militarily defeated in 2017. A month later in November 2019, in response to the death of three Iraqi protesters, Sistani said "No person or group, no side with a particular view, no regional or international actor may seize the will of the Iraqi people and impose its will on them."

=== Shia patronage ===
As the leading cleric in Najaf, Sistani oversees sums amounting to millions of US dollars. His followers offer him a fixed part of their earnings (khums), which is used for educational and charitable purposes. Sistani's office has reported that it supports 35,000 students in Qom, 10,000 in Mashhad, and 4,000 in Isfahan. It also oversees a network of representatives (wakil) "who promote his views in large and small ways in neighborhoods, mosques, bazaars, and seminaries from Kirkuk to Basra".

In Iran, due to the post-invasion opening of the Iraqi cities of Najaf and Karbala to Iranians, many Iranians are said to return from pilgrimage in Iraq as supporters of Sistani.

Sistani sent nearly 1,000 aid packages, mostly food, but also other basic needs, to Balkhab, Afghanistan during the Balkhab uprising in 2022 to help out the displaced Shia Hazaras.

A spokesperson for the al-Abbas Shrine confirmed that Sistani was overseeing the relief campaign conducted by the shrine for displaced Lebanese families amid the Israeli invasion of Lebanon in October 2024. The relief campaign has delivered at least 1,200 tons of aid as of 8 October 2024.

== Religious and political views ==
According to scholar Vali Nasr, Sistani, like his mentor al-Khoei, sees Islamic scholars "mainly as teachers and defenders of the faith". In government he saw the "role of Islam as providing values and guidelines for social order".

He "was not shy" in confronting US occupation authorities about issues such as who had the authority to write Iraq's new constitution and kept them at arm's length, but also avoided "Khomeini-style denunciations" of the United States as the 'Great Satan'. His supporters' demonstrations were "impressively large but peaceful". He opposes both secularism and Shi'i sectarianism.

For Iraq, he "put forth a simple model of government" based "on the principle of majority rule… accountable and representative government that would reflect and protect Shia identity".

At the same time he is conservative in matters of religious law, "unaffected" by the ideas of "modernism".

Though his differences with Iraq's larger and more powerful neighbor the Islamic Republic of Iran and their theory of Velayat-e-faqih are "profound" according to Nasr, Sistani has avoided "entanglements" with them and with the rivalries of Iranian politics, politics and clerics in Lebanon, and "never tried to promote a rivalry" between his religious center of Najaf and the Iranian center in Qom, a reflection, Nasr believes, of Sistani's reluctance to become involved in politics.

Sistani met with Pope Francis on 6 March 2021 during the latter's visit to Iraq. They met for about 40 minutes in Sistani's home in Najaf.

In October 2023, during the Gaza war, Sistani issued a statement in which he 'condemned Israel and called on the world to stand up to the “terrible brutality” in besieged Gaza.' On 23 September 2024, Sistani's office issued a statement condemning the 'brutal Zionist aggression' in Lebanon amidst an intensified Israeli airstrike campaign in the country, urging the international community to uphold the protection of civilians and restore peace in the region. On 28 September 2024, Sistani mourned the death of Hezbollah leader Hassan Nasrallah and condemned his assassination in an Israeli airstrike the previous day.

In June 2025, during the Iran–Israel war, Sistani's office issued a statement condemning Israel's military campaign against Iran and warning that any attack on Iran's senior religious or political leadership would have "dire consequences" for the region. The statement described targeting Iran's leadership as a "criminal act" that could lead to widespread chaos and significantly harm the interests of all nations. It also called on the international community, particularly Islamic countries, to intensify efforts to end the conflict.

On 16 September 2026, the office of Ayatollah Ali al-Sistani said it had given $11 million in aid to families affected by the Ramadan War in Iran. The money was given to the families of those killed and other victims. The Sistani office delegation also took part in a ceremony in Minab to begin construction of the Martyrs' School. The school will be built with help and direct supervision from the Husayni shrine.

=== Criticism of Sufism ===
Ayatollah Sistani does not support the mystic worldview inspired by Ibn Arabi. (Note: Answering a question regarding Ibn Arabi's school of thought, he said: "I believe in the method of the great jurists of Twelver Shi'ism in obtaining religious wisdom, which is in accordance with the verses of the Holy Qur'an and the traditions of the pure infallibles of the Household, peace be upon them, and I do not approve the above-mentioned method.") He has warned young students of the seminary against the increasing influence of Islamic mysticism.

=== Views on homosexuality ===
In 2005, Sistani issued a Fatwa, calling for homosexuals to be killed in "the most severe way". Sistani then retracted the call in 2011.

=== Guardianship of Islamic Jurists (Wilayat al-Faqih) ===
Perhaps because of his great influence, what exactly the position of Sistani is on Ayatollah Khomeini's theory of rule of the Islamic jurist is disputed.

A number of sources include him as opposing the concept. Al-Monitor news service lists him as one of the "four leading Marjas of Najaf (Bashir al-Najafi, Muhammad al-Fayadh, and Muhammad Saeed al-Hakim being the others) who oppose Ruhollah Khomeini's concept" of rule by Islamic jurisprudence. Researcher Hayder Khoei writes that pro-Islamic Republic of Iran propagandists have gone to the trouble of publishing books with fabricated quotes by Sistani in favor of rule by jurists as one of their "propaganda campaigns" in Najaf, to obscure the fact that "Sistani, like the vast majority of Shia clerics based in the city of Najaf, is well-known for his opposition to Wilayat al-Faqih".

Journalist Ali Muhammad quotes political analyst Abdul Wahhab al-Hussaini concerning Khomeini's follower and successor Ali Khamenei:

"The conflict between Najaf and Tehran has become obvious as the two schools are fairly different – especially when it comes to the issue of wilayat al-faqih [the guardianship of the jurist] ... Najafi scholars do not believe in this concept at all, but Khamenei uses it to shore up his authority and influence in the region, especially in Iraq. Khamenei believes that his wilayat al-faqih authority extends to Iraq, while Sistani rejects such intervention, because the country has its own system of governance and the role of the religious authority [in Iraq] is strictly advisory."

Vali Nasr calls his differences with ruling clerics in Iran "profound", and his model of government based on majority rule. Ali Mamouri Medi Khalaji talks of him "explicitly" referring to "velayat-e insan (state guardianship by the people), as opposed to velayat-e faqih (guardianship of the jurist)".

But according to the pro-Khomeini organization Ahl-ul-bayt Islamic Mission, there has been a "West-based campaign" to manipulate "Shi’i public opinion" concerning the "character of Sayed ‘Ali Sistāni and jurists of the Najaf seminary" and to claim the "existence of a quietist and apolitical tradition of Shi’ism among the jurists".

An archived question and answer from his website has this to say on the subject:

Question: What is Grand Ayatollah Sistani's opinion about velayat-e faqih?
Answer: Every jurisprudent (faqih) has wilayah (guardianship) over non-litigious affairs. As for general affairs to which social order is linked and enforcement of doctrine, this depends on certain conditions, one of which is the popularity of the faqih among the majority of momeneen (believers).

On the specific question of obedience to a supreme leader, according to "Ayatollah Watch", Sistani has said that any pronouncement given by a supreme leader "supersedes all (including those given by other Maraji') unless the pronouncements are proven to be wrong or the pronouncements are proven to be against what is in the Qur'an or in Religious Tradition".

Yet another interpretation of his statements comes from Sadegh Zibakalam, who states that Sistani has consistently avoided supporting a strict interpretation of the theory of velayat-e faqih, especially of absolute guardianship, and has not explicitly offered any substantive affirmation of the theory as a whole (including limited guardianship); thereby creating "a major lacuna" in the "grand ideological scenario" of the Islamic Republic of Iran.

=== Government-funded imams ===
In early December 2025, a fatwa by Ali al-Sistani was published on his website (Arabic version) concerning government-paid congregational imams:

Question: In some Islamic countries, the government provides a monthly salary to congregational imams in mosques, some of whom are Shia clerics. What is your honorable view on this matter?
Answer: We advise the believers (may God Almighty honor them) not to perform their prayers behind someone who receives a government salary. This is not meant to disparage them or question their justice, but rather to ensure that these positions and their holders remain completely free from any potential government interference, even in the future.

— Ali al-Sistani, Fatwas » Congregational Prayer

Sistani’s fatwa regarding state-appointed imams has provoked widespread reactions both inside and outside Iran, a Shia-majority Islamic country with a theocratic political system since 1979. In Iran, Friday prayer imams and many other congregational imams receive government salaries and benefits—a practice that, before the establishment of the Islamic Republic, was condemned by many clerics and their supporters. Even Ruhollah Khomeini had criticized clerics connected to the government prior to the 1979 revolution, referring to them as “court clerics.” Opponents of the Iranian government have interpreted Sistani’s statements as a stance against “imams affiliated with power” and as a challenge to the political and religious authority of the Islamic Republic. Figures who had previously criticized the conduct of congregational and Friday prayer leaders cited this fatwa to reiterate their concerns about government influence over the practices and behavior of these imams. Some groups provided explanations, clarifying that the fatwa does not specifically target the Iranian government or its imams. Others argued that the fatwa does not directly apply to Iran, as its primary concern is the independence of the clergy. Additionally, some commentators highlighted the distinction between a binding ruling and a guiding ruling, characterizing Ayatollah Sistani’s fatwa as the latter

Mitra Shojaei, in a report for Deutsche Welle Persian titled “A Fatwa That Challenged the Foundations of Iran’s Guardianship-Based System”, sought the opinions of Iranian clerics living abroad, Mohammad Javad Akbarin and Hasan Yousefi Eshkevari, regarding the fatwa. Akbarin stated that such a statement from a religious authority of Ayatollah Sistani's stature causes the believing community to doubt government clerics and question whether those who receive government salaries could commit injustice. Yousefi Eshkouri argued that the fatwa specifically targets Iran, since in other Islamic countries like Egypt and Saudi Arabia, religious institutions are self-sustaining and do not receive government funding. In contrast, in Iran, not only Friday prayer leaders but “all pillars of the government are in the hands of clerics,” and these clerics also receive government salaries. Yasser Mirdamadi, however, argues that Ayatollah Sistani’s fatwa instructing believers not to pray behind government-appointed imams should not be interpreted as a stance specifically against the Iranian government, but rather as a reflection of his broader, distinctive approach to the relationship between religion and politics.

== Criticism and controversy ==
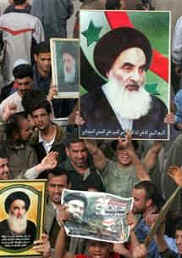
A protest against Al Jazeera in 2007

=== Al Jazeera ===
In May 2007, hundreds of Shias demonstrated publicly in Basra and Najaf to protest comments made by television presenter and journalist Ahmed Mansour during a Qatari broadcast of Al Jazeera television programming. While presenting, Bela Hodod (a.k.a. Without Borders), Mansour voiced skepticism of Sistani's leadership credentials while directing questions about the Iraqi-born cleric, to his guest, Shia cleric Jawad al-Khalsi. Mansour also suggested that Sistani was unaware of contemporary problems in Iraq and of prevailing post-war conditions, and he alleged that Sistani's edicts were largely written and disseminated by aides. At another point, Mansour asked Khalsi whether the United States was using Iraqi politicians, and also Sistani, to promote Western interests in Iraq.

=== Saudi criticism ===
In January 2010, during a Jumu'ah khutba (Friday sermon), an imam employed by the Saudi government, Mohamad al-Arefe, said Sistani was an "obscene, irreligious atheist." Lebanon-based Islamist organization Hezbollah condemned the attack on Sistani, calling the speech "inauspicious," while praising Sistani as one of Shia Islam's "most prominent religious references."

=== Channel 14 ===
In October 2024, right-wing Israeli news agency Channel 14 broadcast a list of "axis of resistance" leaders targeted for assassination, which displayed an image of Sistani under a red crosshair among Hezbollah and Hamas members. The image provoked outrage among the Iraqi public and condemnations from the Iraqi government and the United States' ambassador to Iraq, Alina Romanowski.

== Internet ==
By working with Shia computer programmers and other specialists, Sistani sponsored the establishment of The Ahlulbayt Global Information Center, an international web resource, and he has since been called "the electronic grand ayatollah par excellence."

=== Cyber attacks ===
On 18 September 2008, hackers attacked hundreds of Shia websites. The attacks were reportedly the work of a Muslim faction known as group-xp, based in the Arabian Peninsula and linked to Salafi and Wahhabi movements. They attacked an estimated three hundred Shia internet websites, including The Ahlulbayt (a.s.) Global Information Center. It was later dubbed the "largest Wahhabi hacker attack" in recent years.

After the attack, visitors to the site were greeted by a red attack banner bearing the slogan "group-xp" paired with a message in Arabic denouncing Shia beliefs and officials. Hackers also replaced a video of Sistani with one of comedian Bill Maher mocking Sistani.

However, the attack led to the retaliatory hacking of more than nine hundred Wahhabi and Salafi websites. One such successful attack was documented on video and uploaded to YouTube on 3 October 2008. The hacker, a Shia from the United Arab Emirates using the handle "ShiaZone", was shown logging into email accounts of suspected members of group-xp. The hacked email accounts reportedly yielded group-xp's contact information, information that was subsequently posted on Shia websites.

== Influence and legacy ==
Sistani is considered one of the world leaders of Shia Muslims. One of the most senior scholars of Twelver Shia with the rank of Grand Ayatollah and marja', he has been described as the spiritual leader of Shia Muslims worldwide (as of 2003), "the undisputed leader of Iraq's Shias", included in top positions of "The Muslim 500: The World's Most Influential Muslims", from 2009 to 2024, and named one of the 100 most influential people in the world by Time magazine in 2004 and 2005.

=== Public appearances ===
Sistani has consistently avoided public appearances, despite his widespread fame and not shying away from attention. In practice, Sistani never delivers public sermons or speeches and only releases official statements through "official representatives". The statements are later transcribed and posted on Sistani's official webpage, with the Grand Ayatollah's official stamp, indicating the authenticity of the remarks. Though Sistani has appeared in a few short videos, he does not say anything in these videos and is usually motionless. The only public recording of Sistani's voice is a short, Persian-language lecture by Sistani to students. Another video depicts Sistani in the back of a room conversing with a fellow cleric, again in Persian, and faintly captures sparse bits of Sistani's vocalizations.

Sheikh Abdul-Mahdi Al-Karbalai is Sistani's foremost representative and gives speeches in Sistani's stead. Abdul-Mahdi Al-Karbalai is noted for having announced Sistani's famous fatwa (edict) obligating Iraqis to vote, and with the rise of terrorism, to join the military to oppose ISIS.

== Personal life ==
Sistani was married to the daughter of Muhammad Hasan Shirazi (d. 1972), the granddaughter of Mirza al-Shirazi until her death on September 28, 2025. He has two sons, one of whom is Muhammad Rida.

== Works ==
=== Works translated into English ===
- Current Legal Issues
- A Code of practice for Muslims in the West ISBN 9781546945437
- Fasting: A Haven from Hellfire (2020) ISBN 9780999787748
- Hajj Rituals
- Islamic Laws of Death and Burial (2020) ISBN 9780999787755
- Islamic Laws of Fasting (2022) ISBN 9780999787762
- Islamic Laws According to the Fatwas of His Eminence Al-Sayyid Ali Al-Husayni Al-Sistani (2023) ISBN 9781789910810
- Jurisprudence Made Easy
- Contemporary Legal Rulings in Shia Law

=== Not translated into English ===
His office states that thirty-two other works exist, but have not been translated into English.

== See also ==
- Muhammad Kazim Khurasani
- Mirza Husayn Tehrani
- Abdallah Mazandarani
- Mirza Ali Aqa Tabrizi
- Mirza Sayyed Mohammad Tabatabai
- Seyyed Abdollah Behbahani
- Big Four (Najaf)
