= Marja' =

Highest clerical rank in Usuli Twelver Shia Islam

Marja' (Arabic: مرجع, romanized: marjiʿ ; plural marājiʿ ; lit. 'source to follow' or 'religious reference') is a title given to the highest level of Twelver Shia religious cleric, with the authority given by a hawzah (a seminary where Shi'a Muslim scholars are educated) to make legal decisions within the confines of Islamic law for followers and clerics below him in rank. The highest ranking marjiʿ is known as the marja al-mutlaq or marja al-taqlid al-mutlaq. (Note: According to Robert Gleave: "Marja˓ al-taqlid is a title given to the highest-ranking cleric within Twelver Shi˓ism. ... a number of scholars at the same time could be put forward as "sources" (maraji˓) simultaneously." According to Mohamad Bazzi: "marja al-taqlid" is "a senior cleric whose edicts" the faithful "follow, or emulate", and there are numbers of marja' al-taqlid aka marja'. It is a "marja al-taqlid al-mutlaq" who is the "highest of these marjas ... a supreme religious authority".) A marji' is usually also a grand ayatollah.

Sources differ as to when the institution of the marja' emerged, with Murtadha al-Ansari (died 1864) and Muhammad ibn Ya'qub al-Kulayni (died 940 or 941) both being called the first marja'.

As of 2023, there are more than 50 living maraji, almost all residing in Iran or Iraq.

== Title ==
Currently, maraji' are accorded the title grand ayatollah (Arabic: آية ‌الله العظمی ʾĀyatullāh al-ʿUẓmā). Previously, the titles of Allamah (such as Allameh Tabatabaei, Allameh Majlesi, Allameh Hilli) and Imam (such as Imam Khomeini, Imam Rohani, Imam Shirazi and Imam Sadr) have also been used. Another source (Abbas Djavadi) states a marja' is "usually" a grand ayatollah.

Someone who follows/"imitates" a marja' (who performs taqlid) is known as a muqallid.

=== Other clerical titles ===
Ayatollahs

The title of an ayatollah is bestowed when a scholar/cleric reaches the level in the hawza (seminary) where his students and followers trust him to answer their questions on religious issues. An ayatollah must also have published a juristic book, known as a risalah amaliyah—a manual or treatise of practical religious rulings arranged according to topics dealing with ritual purity, worship, social issues, business, and political affairs. The risalah contains an ayatollah's fatwas on different topics, according to his knowledge of the most authentic Islamic sources and their application to current life. Traditionally only the most renowned ayatollahs of the given time published a risalah. Although some of the most well-known ayatollahs have declined to write one, numerous others of very prestigious backgrounds have done so in recent years.

Marja al-taqlid al-mutlaq

The highest marja' or "first-among-equals", is called the Marja al-taqlid al-mutlaq.

== Role, authority, requirements ==
Traditionally, taqlid ("imitation") of an expert in Islamic jurisprudence (a mujtahid) is not only lawful but obligatory on many religious questions for all Muslims not so trained themselves; (on "matters of belief" or usulu 'din, it is obligatory for Shi'a to train themselves). From the perspective of Shi'i jurisprudence, during the occultation of the Mahdi, (for the past 1000+ years) the highest ranking Shia hawzah clerics are bestowed with responsibility for understanding and explaining Islamic religious jurisprudence. As of the 19th century, the Shia ulama taught believers to turn to "a source of taqlid" (marja' at-taqlid) "for advice and guidance and as a model to be imitated."

=== Providing religious guidance ===
Abbas Djavadi gives examples of how a muqallid would imitate their marja':

Imagine you are a Shi'ite Muslim facing a long intercontinental flight and you aren't sure how to arrange your prayers or ablutions. Or imagine there is a political event or dispute in your society, such as an election, and you are not sure how to act. You check the book of your marja, the risalah (treatise on practical Islamic law), and find the answers you need.

Every marja has his own risalah. For things that cannot be found in those books, you turn to the nearest representative of your marja, write a letter or e-mail or, more recently, raise the question on the website of your marja and receive your answer.

=== Authority ===
Where a difference in opinion exists between the maraji', each of them provides their own opinion and the muqallid (their followers) will follow their own marja's opinion on that subject. Exempted from the requirement to follow a marja' are mujtahid, i.e. someone who has completed advanced training (dars kharij) in the hawza and has acquired the license to engage in ijtihad (ʾijāz al-ʾijtihād) from one or several ayatollahs. However ijtihad is not always comprehensive and so a mujtahid may be an expert in one particular area of Islamic jurisprudence (fiqh) and exercise ijtihad therein but follow a marja' in other areas of fiqh.

=== Who and where ===
Several senior grand ayatollahs preside over hawzas (religious seminaries). The hawzas of Qom and Najaf are the preeminent seminary centers for the training of Shia clergymen. However, there are other smaller hawzas in many other cities around the world, the biggest ones being Karbala (Iraq), Isfahan (Iran) and Mashhad (Iran).

There are 56 maraji living worldwide as of 2023, mostly residing in Najaf and Qom. The most prominent among them are Hossein Vahid Khorasani, Mousa Shubairi Zanjani, Sayyid Sadeq Rohani, Naser Makarem Shirazi, Sadiq Hussaini Shirazi, Hossein Noori Hamedani, Ali Khamenei and Abdollah Javadi-Amoli in Iran; Ali Sistani, Muhammad al-Fayadh, Muhammad Saeed al-Hakim and Bashir al-Najafi in Iraq.

=== Conditions for a marja' ===
There is no formalized specific process nor official body resembling a council of ulama to designate someone a marja al-taqlid, because reaching the position of marja al-taqlid "is entirely at the discretion of the believers themselves". Nonetheless, there are "general principles" for their selection, including several "conditions" which have been "accepted unanimously by Shiʿite theologians".

- maturity (bulugh),
- reasonableness (aql),
- being of the male sex (dhukurrat),
- faith (iman),
- justice (edalat), and
- legitimacy of birth.

Another condition is being able to raise enough money "to finance the education of religious students" from donations from the believers, is one of the qualifications of a marja'.

=== How a follower chooses a marja' ===
A marja'-e taqlid must first have devoted himself to the study of Islamic law until he is qualified as a mojtahed or faqih (jurist), which means that he can derive his own legal rulings and issue edicts on religious law. Baqer Moin explains that

unlike the Catholic pope or Christian bishops, he is not chosen by an electoral college, or by any other formal procedure. It is incumbent on every believer or `imitator` to make his or her own choice of marja'-e taqlid on the ground that he is the most learned mojtahed of his time and a man of great moral probity. "Of course, most ordinary people are not in a position to judge who is the most learned, so believers are instructed either to inquire of two upright and knowledgeable persons who are not contradicted by two other similar persons, or to satisfy themselves on the evidence of a group of learned and upright persons. In practice this means that most people rely on the assurances of their local mollahs, who in their turn will be influenced by people they respect or are further up the religious hierarchy. Hence the importance to any leading divine of a following among students and the lesser clergy, who will promote his position in this informal process of consultation."

== History ==
=== First marja' ===
Shi'i "biographical compilations generally" consider Muhammad ibn Ya'qub al-Kulayni (d. 940 or 941) – one of the first compilers of Shi'ite hadith – to be "the first" post-occultation marja al-taqlid, according to Neguin Yavari and Eric Hooglund. However, according to Robert Gleave, the institution of the marja' did not emerged until the nineteenth century, (Note: Ahmad Kazemi Moussavi agrees) with the first universally recognized marja', "the influential mujtahid Murtadha al-Ansari (d. 1864)". Still another source – four mullahs at al-islam.org who were asked directly "Who was the first ever Marja-e-Taqleed?" – was non-committal. Only one of four (Mohammad Al-Musawi) replied and would only say, "from the time of the Prophet (SAWA) and the Infallible Imams, Muslims who lived in places far away from them, were ordered to refer in religious matters to the scholar in their area".

Shiite authorities in the history of Shi'ism have an important role in the religious, political and social thought of their communities. One example is the fatwa of Mirza Mohammed Hassan Husseini Shirazi imposing sanctions on the use of tobacco during Qajar rule, which led to the abolition of the tobacco concession.

=== Usulism and Akhbaris ===
Taqlid ("imitation") – i.e. the acceptance of a religious ruling in matters of worship and personal affairs from someone regarded as a higher religious authority (e.g. an 'ālim) without necessarily asking for the proof – is an important tenet of Usuli doctrine. Usulism (Arabic: الأصولية, romanized: al-ʾUṣūliyya) has been the majority school of Twelver Shia Islam since the crushing of the other school (Akhbaris) in the late 18th century. The Usulis favor the use of ijtihad (reasoning) in the creation of new rules of jurisprudence; in assessing hadith to exclude traditions they believe unreliable; and in considering it obligatory to obey a mujtahid when seeking to determine Islamically correct behavior.

== See also ==
- Hawza
- Ijtihad
- Mufti
- Risalah (fiqh)
- Society of Seminary Teachers of Qom
- Ulema
- List of ayatollahs
- List of current maraji
- List of deceased maraji
