= Fatemeh Amini =

Female religious leader of Iran

Fatemeh Amini is a female religious leader of Iran, who has directed and opened a number of women's seminaries in Qom and Tehran.

She was the director of the first women's hawza in Qom, the Dar al-Zahra, which was the women's wing of grand ayatollah Mohammad Kazem Shariatmadari's hawza Dar al-Tabligh.

According to an interview with Azadeh Kian-Thiébaut, Amini also opened the women's madrasas Maktab-e Ali in Qom and Maktab-e Zahra in Yazd before the revolution. Later, she founded the Tehran Seminary Fatemeh Zahra in 1988. Regarding the latter, Amini states that “Our goal is to contribute to women's development by giving impetus to their creativity, thereby also increasing their self-esteem.” The seminary provides religious training for women, and based on a micro-credit system, which grants interest-free loans to poor families and female university students, it financially and morally assists deprived women in order to boost their activities in the public sphere. Amini points out that she received the permission to spend religious tax (sahm-e imam) of a marja whom she does not name, but that she declined as she preferred to remain independent. In its place, she set up the micro-finance system.

== See also ==
- Dar al-Zahra
- Maktab-e Tawhid
- Hawza
- Jamiat al-Zahra
