= Al-Tujjar =

al-Tujjar may refer to:

== People ==
- Haji Rais al-Tujjar, Iranian person
- Hashimiyah al-Tujjar, Iranian scholar
- Iftikhar al-Tujjar (1912–1977), Iranian scholar

== Other uses ==
- Khan al-Tujjar (disambiguation)
