= Amina Bint al-Majlisi =

Safavid era Persian Shiite scholar

Mujtahideh Amina Bint al-Majlisi
- آمنه بیگم مجلسی

Personal details
- Spouse: Mohammad Salih al-Mazandarani
- Relations: Mohammad-Baqer Majlesi (brother)
- Children: Mohammad Sa'id Ashraf Mazandarani; Mohammad Hadi Mazandarani
- Parent: Mulla Muhammad Taqi Majlisi (father)

Amina Begum Bint al-Majlisi was a female Safavid mujtahideh. She was the daughter of the great Safavid religious scholar Mulla Muhammad Taqi Majlisi and granddaughter of the mujtahideh Zubaiyda, who was in turn the daughter of the great philosopher Mulla Sadra. Amina's brother was Mulla Muhammad Baqir Majlisi, the author of the well-known work Bihar al-anvar, to which Amina contributed. She married a student of her father's, Mohammad Salih al-Mazandarani. She was the mother of Persian poets and scholars, Mohammad Hadi Mazandarani and Mohammad Sa'id Ashraf Mazandarani.

The family lived in Isfahan, the capital city of the Safavid Empire. The city of Isfahan has a long educational tradition of Shiite ‘Alimat (Islamic preachers) and Muhaddithat (traditionalists). The practice reached a peak during the Safavid era.

Amina achieved considerable mastery of authoritative works in Shiite jurisprudence, such as the commentaries on Alfiyeh by Ibn Malik, Shawahid by al-Siyuti, as well as the al-Qava'id by Allameh Hilli. Many great Shiite scholars referred to her as Mujtahidah. The great Marja’ Agha Ahmad Behbahani in his book Mir’at ul ahval jahan nama declared that Amina was an ‘Alima and qualified Mujtahed (jami’ul sharayet) who wrote a book in Islamic jurisprudence (fiqh). The author of Riadhul ‘ulama, who was her contemporary and a pupil of Amina’s husband, described Amina as ‘Alima and Saliha'. He also asserted that she helped her husband to solve the difficulties of Al-Qava’id.

Amina's niece, named “Bint al-Azizullah” (daughter of Mulla Azizulla) was also a mujtahida.

== See also ==
- Lady Amin
- Zohreh Sefati
- Iftikhār al-Tujjar
- Zīnah al-Sādāt Humāyūnī
