= Farideh Mostafavi Khomeini =

Iranian religious scholar (born 1943)

Sayyida Farideh Mostafavi Khomeini (Persian: فریده مصطفوی خمینی; born 1943) is an Iranian female religious scholar and Ruhollah Khomeini's youngest daughter.

Farideh Mostafavi studied Islamic studies at home as well as in several maktabs of Qom in the 1970s. Remarkably, she began her formal ḥawza education in the women's section (Dar al-Zahra) of Ayatollah Shariatmadari’s hawza Dar al-Tabligh. Ayatollah Shariatmadari was later a major opponent of Khomeini during the 1979 revolution, although Shariatmadari had saved Khomeini's life in the 1960s. Mrs Mostafavi later studied at Maktab-e Tawhid and completed her studies at Jamiat al-Zahra in Qom. She now teaches at Jamiat al-Zahra and has been a member of the board of trustees of Jamiat al-Zahra since 1990.

Mostafavi used to run a charity, together with other women, called Moasseseh Davazdah-e Farvadin, which built a public bath for women in Qom and ran sewing and cooking classes. She was also one of the co-founders, together with Fatemeh Tabatabai, the daughter in law of Khomeini, of the Jamiat-e Zanan-e Jomhuri-ye Islami, the Society of Women of the Islamic Republic.
