= Women's education in Iran =

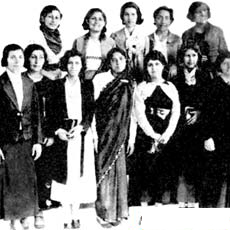
Iranian women at the first female university included Mehrangiz Manouchehrian (senator), Shams ol-Moluk Mosahab (senator) and Bardrolmolouk Bamdad.

Formal education for women in Iran began in 1907 with the establishment of the first primary school for girls. Education held an important role in Iranian society, especially as the nation began a period of modernization under the authority of Reza Shah Pahlavi in the early 20th century when the number of women's schools began to grow. By mid-century, legal reforms granting women the right to vote and raising the minimum age for marriage offered more opportunities for women to pursue education outside the home. After periods of imposed restrictions, women's educational attainment continued its rise through the Islamification of education following the Iranian Revolution of 1979, peaking in the years following radical changes in the curriculum and composition of classrooms. By 1989, women dominated the entrance examinations for college attendance.

Women's participation in education has not slowed despite efforts to impose restrictions on the increasingly female-dominated educational sphere. The changes in women's education have split into increased usage and dominance of the opportunities available to women, and the imposition of strict requirements governing their role in education, including gender-segregated classes, Islamic dress, and the channeling of women into "feminine" majors that prevent the pursuit of certain careers.

== History of education for women in Iran ==
The nature of education for Iranian women changed significantly from the period leading up to the Iranian Revolution when compared to the imposition of restrictions following it. Despite the various obstacles for women entering an educational setting, they manage to comprise the majority of college attendees and outperform their male peers on university admissions tests as well as in graduation rates.

=== Pre-Iranian Revolution ===
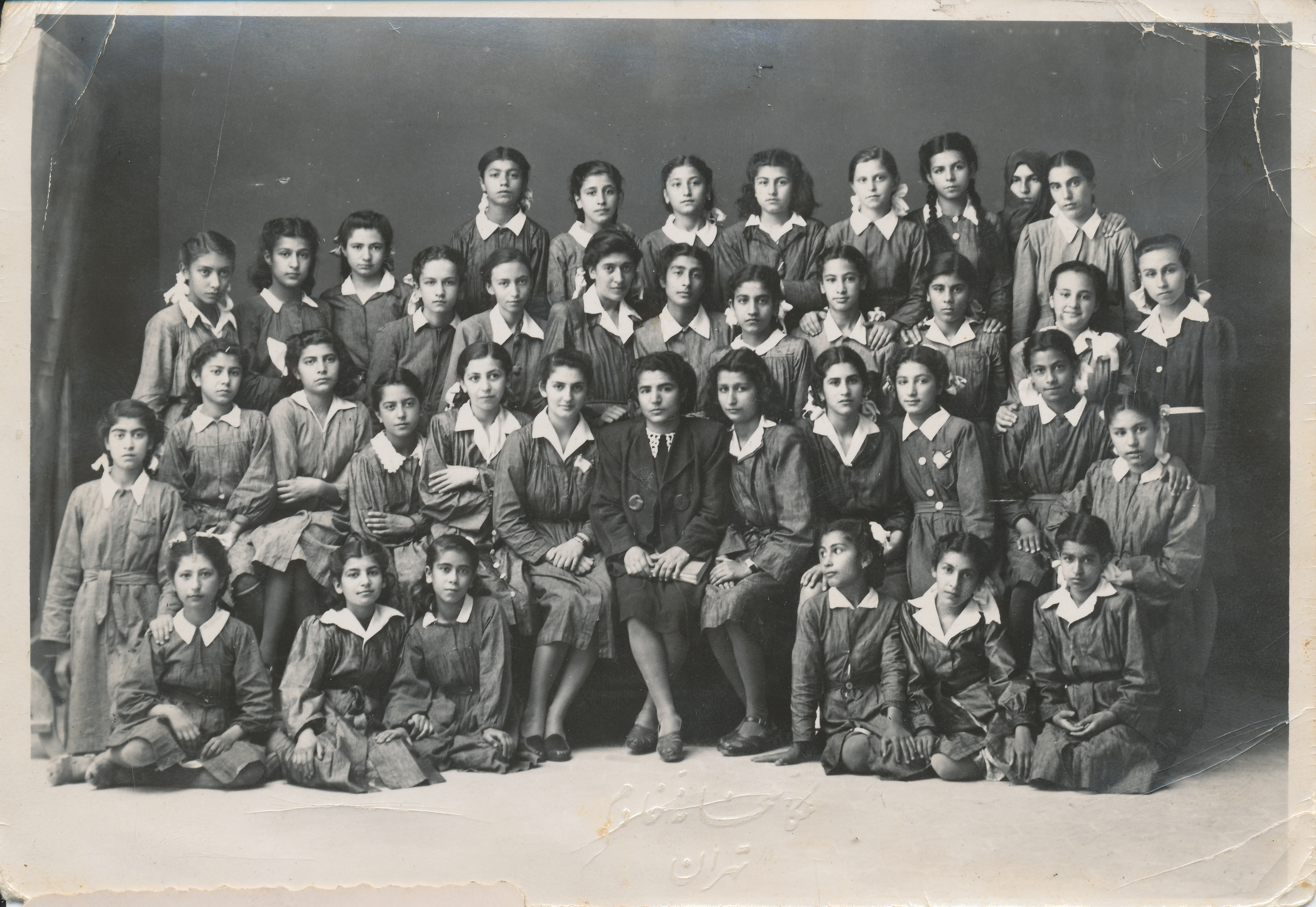
A group of students of Maziar Girls’ Primary School in 1327 (1948–1949)

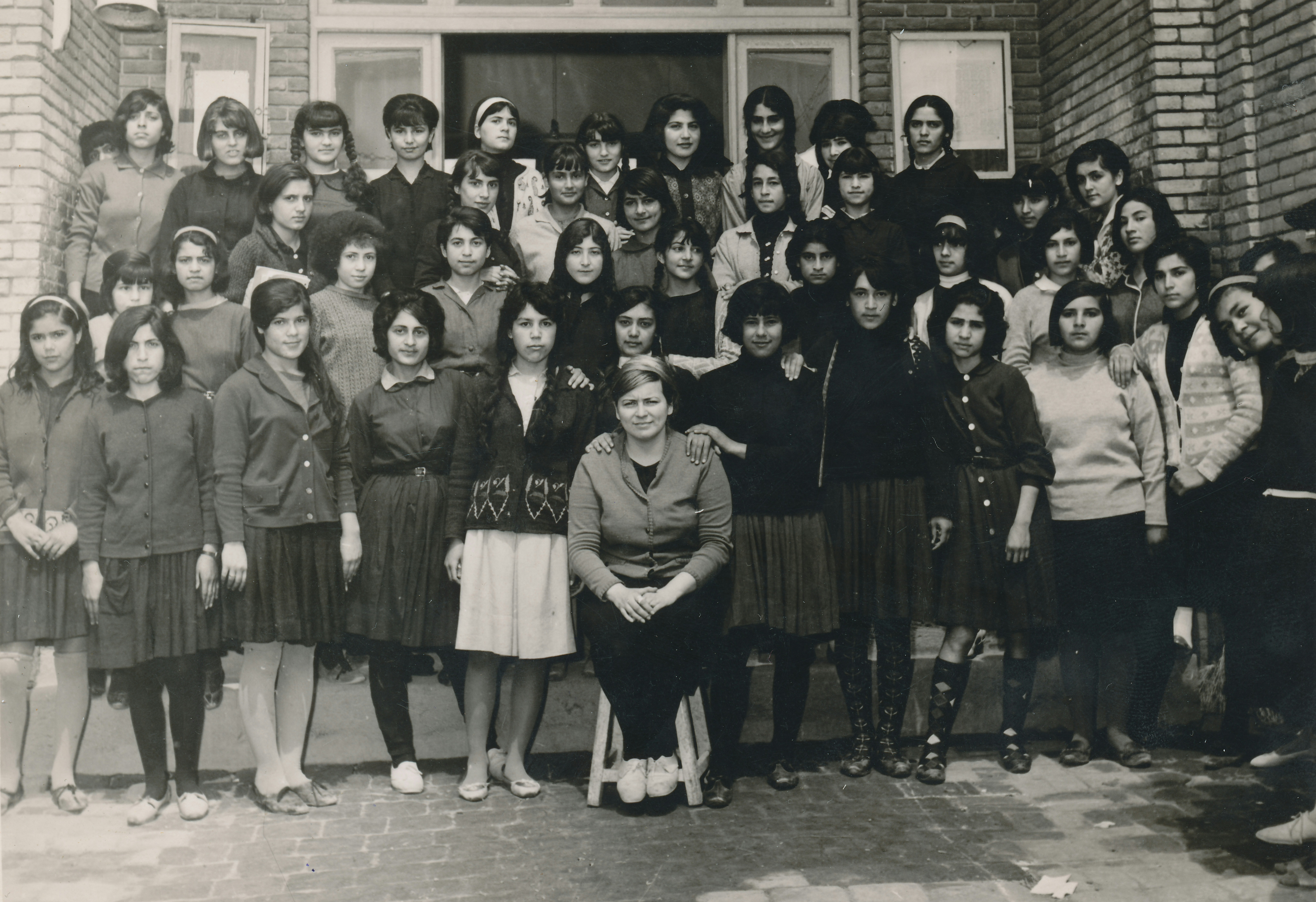
A group of students of Pourandokht Girls’ High School in Ardabil in 1344 (1965–1966)

In the 19th century, Western missionaries opened schools for girls in Iran, such as the Fiske Seminary in 1838, but for a long time, the authorities did not allow them to enroll Muslim students. Iran Bethel School was established by an American Presbyterian missionary organization for girls school in 1874; the school initially only enrolled European and Iranian Christian students, but received Muslim girls from 1888.

At the beginning of the 20th century education for women expanded slowly, with enrollment of female students in the 1922 academic year totaling just over 7200 students compared with 35,000 of their male peers. In 1935, women first experienced the secularization of Iran's educational system when the University of Tehran was established. As the nation's secularization created demand for professionally trained students, women were encouraged to attend schools. Education became a social norm and a marker of achievement in Iranian society..

On the eve of the Iranian Revolution, in 1976–77, 40 percent of secondary school enrollment was female. These numbers largely reflect the upper echelon of Iranian society, as women who were a part of an ethnic minority or from rural areas of Iran were largely excluded from these educational reforms.

=== Education from Iranian Revolution, 1979-1989 ===
The Iranian Revolution of March 1979 ushered in a period of conservative leadership that altered the role and conception of the new model female in Iranian society. The period was characterized by the retraction of previously passed laws reforming women's status in the home, and the institution in its place of family and civil law based in notions of patriarchy.

The newly enacted Constitution of the Islamic Republic of Iran stated the importance of women's economic and social well-being, yet did not guarantee the right to educational opportunities. Instead, the new regime of religious authority cracked down on women's participation in education, barring coeducation. Immediately following the Revolution, universities and many high schools were shut down, not to be reopened for another 3 years. During this time many female faculty were excused from their positions and many women lost their jobs. This included all female judges as well as women who held positions of authority in the government.

Upon reopening of schools and under the leadership of Ayatollah Khomeini, educational curriculum was altered to reflect a new focus on Islamic values. Women were depicted wearing a veil in textbooks, appearing in social studies books as managers of the home and offering guidance on Islam and schoolwork. Men were depicted as providers for the family's needs. Some women did appear in pursuit of farming or factory work, working in hospitals and in schools in these textbooks, mostly in conformity with a gender stereotype of feminine work.

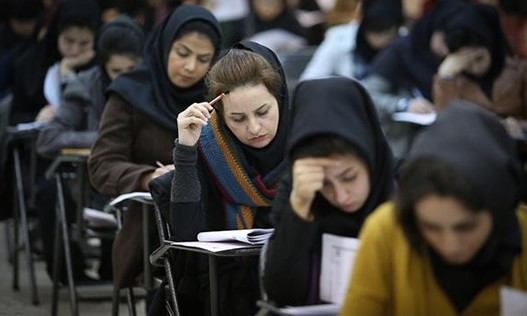
Iranian women taking the university entrance exam

Textbooks and curriculum remained uniform across genders, though the Ministry of Education's "Study of Professions" textbooks differentiated between "male" and "female" specializations and were distributed according to gender. In 1982, gender stereotyped work was institutionalized by the Ministry of Education's introduction of KAr va Danesh, an experiential cooperative day in which students were excused from school to work in various occupations. For females, these experiences consisted of workshops focused on topics such as nutrition, child rearing, cooking, and health.

Course restrictions in higher education also began under the authority of religious leader Khomeini, in which men and women were each barred from studying certain majors. Women were excluded from studying veterinary science, animal husbandry, geology, and natural resources, while men were precluded from subjects such as fashion design, obstetrics, and mid-wifery. Of 108 mathematics and computer science majors, women were only permitted to study 43. The government also established quotas for certain specializations, capping the number of women who could pursue specified majors to ensure against the domination of women in these subjects. To comply with the segregation of sexes in schooling and employment, the segregation of subjects led to the founding of a women's only medical school so that female patients could seek treatment from a female physician.

Out of fear that single women may be corrupted by external society, state scholarships to study abroad were also restricted, offered to male students and married women only. The "Sponsorship for Foreign Students Act" additionally required that married women who received the scholarship be accompanied by their husbands.

Beginning in 1980, female faculty and students were directed to wear Islamic dress by the Ministry of Education. The institution of veiling throughout Iran in 1981 extended the compulsion to women beginning at 6 years of age. At this time many schools limited teachers to instruct only same-gendered students.

=== Khomeini to Khatami, 1989-2005 ===
In 1989, the First Economic, Social, and Cultural Development Plan of the Islamic Republic of Iran, 1989–1993, offered improvement in women's educational opportunities and involvement in social and economic life as key targets for the incoming administration. Following the death of Khomeini in 1989, President Rafsanjani began a process of scaling back restrictions on women's education. Hurdles to education still existed, with the majority of Iranian women married by the age of 19 at the start of the 1990s. The situation was more dire for rural female students, with half of female Iranians living outside urban areas remaining uneducated.

Progress began to be made toward alleviating some of these restrictions in the 1990s. Quotas restricting the number of women who could study particular fields were eliminated while the Women's Cultural and Social Council, an institution headed by Iranian women who held influential positions in Iran, began studying the effects continued restrictions had on the Iranian economy. This led to a lifting of all remaining quotas or bans on studying particular fields, completed in 1993. By the 1990s many of the restrictions imposed on majors were also lifted, offering women more opportunities to pursue a degree in fields such as veterinary science that were banned under the Khomeini government. More women beyond the few, urban elite that initially enrolled in higher education began to attend school under its Islamic form, no longer hesitant about sending their children to institutions taught by men.

Educational opportunities continued through the rule of Mohammad Khatami, who served as President of Iran from 1997 to 2005. Khatami viewed the home as the proper setting for an Iranian woman, yet did not seek to exclude her from participation in the public sphere. Noting the increasing dominance of women in higher education, Khatami stated that though the increase was concerning, he did not wish to create obstacles in order to reduce this participation. Khatami called for an opening of majors and specialities for women in universities and an end to the quota system.

At the beginning of Khatami's presidency, over 95 percent girls in Iran attended elementary school. In 1997–98, 38.2 percent of Iranian women enrolled in higher education. This number rose to 47.2 percent by 2000. As female enrollment in schooling continued to climb, the segregation of the sexes in academic specialization continued to persist through the end of the 1990s. In the 1998–99 academic year, males dominated enrollment in math-physics and technical fields with 58 and 71 percent of the enrolled class of secondary school students. Women disproportionately comprised the humanities and experimental sciences field with 61 percent enrollment. Gender specialization continued through university level where the fields of basic sciences, medical sciences, and arts were studied by a majority of women, and agriculture and veterinary science, engineering, and humanities were pursued mostly by men. Overall, however, the decade was characterized by a three-fold increase in female enrollment in higher education.

At the turn of the 21st century the government continued to scale back restrictions. By 2000, the government supported the establishment of a Women's Studies course to be offered for graduate level study of topics including women's rights. A 2001 report on women's status in Iran published by his office emphasized the goal of improving educational materials for women to reflect their modern role in society, including the counseling of high school students toward specializations that were traditionally dominated by men. In 2001, the government also authorized the use of the "Sponsorship for Foreign Students Act" supplement for single women to study abroad, a change from the former restriction. Single women could avail themselves of the funds to pursue higher education in foreign institutions, with the consent of their fathers. 2001 is also the year that female enrollment in university-level education exceeded that of men, showing their continued dominance of education.

The statistics of the Khatami presidency show the slow rise of female participation in education. In 2002, women dominated the results of its national college entrance examination, comprising 62 percent of passing students. Women pursuing teaching positions in higher education also made gains during this period, holding nearly half of all assistant professorships at universities, nearly double that held a decade before. The number of women accepted into tenured-track and full-time professorships in 2001–02 remained low at 17.3 percent as it was not nearly as proportionate to the number of educated women in Iranian society.

=== Ahmadinejad era, 2005-2013 ===
Many of the reforms achieved earlier in Rasfanjani and Khatami's presidencies were eroded with the election of Mahmoud Ahmadinejad in 2005. In 2006, the average woman in Iran attended school for nine years. At the start of his presidency in 2007–08, women's gains in education permeated every level, composing 44 percent of students pursuing associate degrees, 55 percent of bachelor's degree students, 43 percent of master's degree students, and a high 58 percent of students pursuing a professional doctorate. Women also dominated 6 of the 7 academic fields offered at university level, save for engineering, comprising the majority of students studying veterinary sciences, basic sciences, human sciences, medical sciences, agriculture and the arts.

With the former rise of participation by women in education and the reduction of artificially created obstacles to their success in pursuing studies, conservative forces in the Iranian government became alarmed at the erosion of traditional notions of women's role in the home and the competition in the labor market with educated men for whom work outside the home was essential. The government took action, with Ahmadinejad appointing a religious cleric as the chancellor of the secular Tehran University in November 2005. In 2006, the Ministry of Health and Education imposed a quota system on particular majors and specialities and restricted enrollment of women to universities located in their hometowns. It also instituted the gender segregation of higher education.

The response from students to what was perceived as the attempt to turn secular universities into religious institutions were protests demanding the preservation of civil liberties, such as the freedom of speech. Conservative politicians demanded, in turn, a crackdown on the "westernization" of secular education and an imposition of Islamic philosophy. The Supreme Leader's spokesman for higher education, Hojatoleslam Mohammadian, and the Minister of Science and Higher Education, Mohammad Mehdi Zahedi, both called for the Islamization of universities, while Mohammadian also stated his opposition to women pursuing certain studies in higher education.

In 2009 Ahmadinejad's pursuit of the further de-feminization of education led to the establishment of the "Special Council for the Development and Promotion of Humanities." Iran's Supreme Council of the Cultural Revolution oversaw this effort, in which seven appointees were responsible for infusing humanities discipline with Islamic principles.

==== 2010-11 restrictions ====
In 2010, Iran again adopted a quota system to limit the number of women able to enter university education. Iran imposed restrictions on a dozen social studies courses, including women's studies and human rights, on the grounds that "The content of the current courses in the 12 subjects is not in harmony with religious fundamentals and they are based on Western schools of thought."

In 2011, universities began to announce new restrictions on entry to female students. Whereas previously students who scored highest on the previously gender-neutral university entrance exam, the Konkur, were placed in the best university programs across the country, universities now barred females from enrollment in over 70 specializations. The practical result was to concentrate more women in local universities closer to their homes, and farther from the urban, more secular universities they were otherwise qualified to attend.

===== January 2011 Allameh Tabatabai University announcement =====
In January 2011, the president of Allameh Tabatabai University in Tehran, Sadreddin Shariati, announced that subjects with large numbers of students would be split by gender. Prior to this, university libraries and canteens were already segregated. It was claimed that the Iranian public had already been requesting gender segregation in education in some highly religious areas and in the capital; also, such segregation was said to already be in progress in a number of other Iranian universities. Senior cleric Hojatoleslam Mohammad Mohamadian pushed for segregated classes in 2006, and again in 2009; other governmental requests to allow segregation date back over 15 years.

==== August 2012 course ban ====
On 20 August 2012, an announcement was made by Iran's Ministry of Science, Research and Technology that 36 universities in Iran would be cutting 77 fields of study from the female curriculum, making them male-only fields. The fields chosen include most sciences and engineering, among others. The curriculum change was set to be implemented for the 2013 school year and the fields of study limitations for women have been added to the university "leaflets". Universities like the Oil Industry University have completely barred women from attending, citing the "lack of employer demand".

The announcement came soon after the release of statistics showing that women were graduating in far higher numbers than men from Iranian universities and were scoring overall better than men, especially in the sciences.

This reasoning was echoed by Isfahan University, which stated that from those that obtained mining engineering degrees "98 percent of female graduates ended up jobless". The disciplines related to agriculture were also regarded as "unfit" for female students. Therefore, as a consequence of this move, women may not become engineers, nuclear physicists, archaeologists, business graduates and computer scientists in Iran. They are also banned from attending the departments of English literature, translation and hotel management. Another reason given was that because of a shortage of available female dormitories, attendance had to be lowered. A comparison was made, however, to the fact that nursing was made a female-only degree in the same announcement.

The possibility of fields of study restrictions was first reported by the Mehr News Agency on 6 August 2012. The news followed the release of the year's entrance exam scores, showing that 60 percent of university attendees are women, along with test scores of the past few years showing women largely outperforming men. This included 52 percent of university graduates and 68 percent of science degree graduates being women. These results have caused concern among the senior clerics of the country, who became worried about the "social side-effects of rising educational standards among women, including declining birth and marriage rates".

Amnesty International reported that in April 2012, university security personnel at the Roudehen Branch of Islamic Azad University beat female students who were not complying with hijab (Islamic dress) standards. They also claimed reports of quotas restricting women's admission to specific university programs ("designed to reduce women’s access to specific fields of study") implemented by the Ministry of Science, Research and Technology. Such restrictions on women's educational choices were said to violate the prohibition on discrimination and Iran's obligations under international law.

===== Responses =====
Seyed Abolfazl Hassani, a senior Iranian education official, stated in defense of the announcement that, "Some fields are not very suitable for women’s nature, such as agricultural machinery or mining, partly because of the hard work involved in them." The policy change was criticized by some Iranian parliamentarians, such as Mohammad-Mehdi Zahedi, head of the Iranian parliament's education and research committee. However, Kamran Daneshjoo, the science and higher education minister, gave a "guarded response" to the news, saying that the universities would have to state a reason, but also supported the change by explaining that "90 percent of degrees remain open to both sexes and that single-gender courses were needed to create 'balance'." Zahedi said in response that Daneshjoo is "expected to present himself to parliament to explain this policy".

Iranian Nobel Peace Prize winner and human rights activist Shirin Ebadi wrote to the United Nations in protest of the restrictions, stating that the Iranian government is "trying to limit the active presence of women in society". She has asked for the issue to be added to "Iran's human rights dossier". The letter was then forwarded to UN special rapporteur for Iran Ahmad Shaheed and to the UN High Commissioner for Human Rights Navanethem Pillay. Ebadi also added that the purpose of this policy change is to reduce the number of female university attendees to below 50 percent, down from the current 65 percent. On 22 September 2012, Human Rights Watch urged Iran to reverse the new policy, claiming that such restrictions are a violation of the international right to education for everyone without discrimination.

=== Rouhani era, 2013-Present ===
When Hassan Rouhani took control of the presidency in 2013, there was hope that he would usher in a radical shift in Iranian society toward equal women's rights. Hopes that he would scale back quota use and institute more lenient reforms have not been fully realized, with the UN Special Rapporteur noting in a 2015 report that significant discrimination against women still persists in the political and economic spheres, overshadowing the gains made in education. The Special Rapporteur also noted that despite 14 recommendations made to alleviate the obstacles currently preventing equal gender attainment in the educational sphere, the Rouhani government rejected consideration of all of them.

While the vast majority of Iranian students who attend secondary school do not go on to study at a university, 42 percent of women who take the university entrance exams continue on to higher education, compared to 29 percent of males. The state of literacy and educational attainment among ethnic minority females is also poor when compared to urban, non-minority peers, as they are not forced to attend school and often enter marriage at an early age.

The dual nature of female participation in education is not yet reflected in their role in the economy, where 20–25 percent of educated women are able to find work.

== Alternative schooling options for women in Iran ==
=== Adult literacy programs ===
In addition to formal education, women in Iran may enroll in literacy programs. These programs target women, offering basic training in simple math, reading, and writing. In the 1990s, women composed over two-thirds of enrollees in these programs. This may have contributed to the steep rise in female literacy rates in Iran in the 1990s, which increased twenty percent from 1987 to 1997.

=== Religious schools ===
Religious schools have also become an educational option for Iranian women, and the rise in the institution of "female seminaries" to 280 as of 2010 shows their increasing use as an academic pursuit. The popularity stems from the infusion of religion into Iran post-revolution, when Ayatollah Khomeini called for the establishment of Jami‘at al-Zahra in 1984, the first female seminary in Iran. The institution, a consolidation of smaller religious schools, offers enrollees the chance to earn anything from high school diplomas to doctoral degrees. Women must apply to enroll in the institutions, where only 7,000 women were accepted from a field of over 25,000 applicants in the 2010 academic year.

Seminaries have served as an alternative to higher education when female applicants are denied admission, either as a result of academic success or the quota system employed by public universities.

=== Other schooling ===
Newly married Iranian women must attend government-mandated family planning classes. Information on health and birth control use is included in these programs.

== Role of education in Iran ==
Though education has been dominated in many fields by females, especially at the university level, it has not enabled women to enter the work force in comparative numbers. Aside from having an empowering aspect for women, some scholars note increased schooling has yet to result in paid employment increases or roles in authoritative positions of employment. While female participation in the paid economy was shown to increase by a third after the Iranian Revolution, the seemingly optimistic figure was attributed more so to the continued employment of women already in the labor force rather than an increase in newly graduated women successfully entering it. Whereas 23.5 million men held paid positions in the Iranian economy in 2006, for instance, merely 3.5 million Iranian women obtained similar positions, or 20 percent of the labor force pool.

The increase in educational opportunities has also not correlated with an increase in the number of educated women entering decision-making positions in government or the private economy. Women are largely absent from high-level full-time professorship positions or as heads of institutions of higher educations, a reality made more difficult by the low enrollment rate of women at the master's and specialized doctorate levels of education that are necessary for positions in university-level positions. Some scholars have argued that education has contributed to female self-empowerment, giving women a task to achieve that is outside the home even if it does lead to viable employment.

Survey evidence indicates that young educated Iranian women view education as important or very important to a female in Iranian society, more so than other members of Iranian society. More of these educated youth also believe, more so than their non-educated and older female compatriots, that their daughters should marry following attendance of an institution of higher education. The education of Iranian women has correspondingly led to a delayed entry into marriage, with non-educated females more than half as likely to be married by the time they turn 22 years old than educated peers. Education is also shown to contribute to the delayed start of having a family, with the majority of educated women having their first child by the age of 24, 4 years later than non-educated women in Iran.

== See also ==
- Higher education in Iran
- Women in Iran
- Women's rights in Iran
- Hawza
