= Hawza =

Shi'a seminary

A hawza (Arabic: حوزة) or ḥawzah ʿilmīyah (Arabic: حوزة علمیة) is the collective term (plural hawzat) for a madrasa (i.e. seminary) where Shi'a Muslim scholars are educated.

The word ḥawzah is Arabic, and has been adopted into Persian as a loan word. In Arabic, the word means "to hold something firmly". Accordingly, ḥawzah ʿilmīyah would mean a place where the firm knowledge (of the Muslim religion) is acquired. In the Persian language, ḥawzah refers to the middle part of a place or an area. Ḥawzah ʿilmīyah in Persian, therefore, means "the place of knowledge". Another meaning of the word is "circle of knowledge".

Several senior Grand Ayatollahs constitute the hawza. The institutions in Najaf, Iraq and Qom, Iran, are the preeminent seminary centers for the education of Shi'a scholars. However, several smaller hawzas exist in other cities around the world, such as at Karbala, Iraq; Isfahan and Mashhad in Iran; Beirut, Lebanon; Lucknow, India; Lahore, Pakistan; Europe; and North America.

In countries with sharia courts such as Iran, Pakistan, and Afghanistan, a hawza also functions as a law school for those wanting to practice law in Islamic courts.

== Hawza 'Ilmiyya Najaf ==
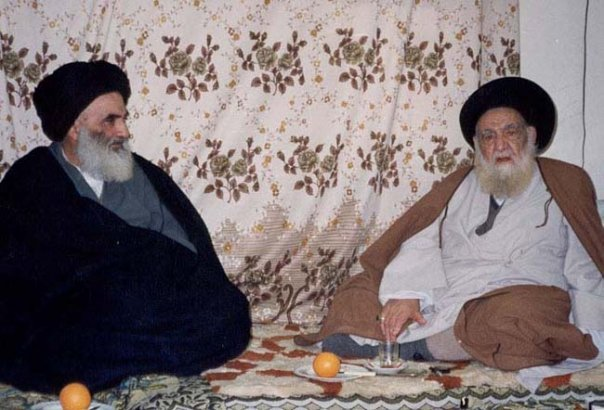
Ali al-Sistani (current chancellor of Hawza 'Ilmiyya Najaf) and Abu al-Qasim al-Khoei (ex-chancellor of Hawza 'Ilmiyya Najaf).

The exact date of the establishment of the Hawza of Najaf is unknown, and indeed in what century it was established is disputed, with one view maintaining that the Hawza existed possibly as early as the 9th century AD in the form of a guild of learned men centered around the Imam Ali Shrine whose deanship was held by a number of scholars, such as Ibn al-Sidra Sayyid Sharif al-Din Mohammed and Nasir al-Din Mutahhar Ibn Radhi al-Din Mohammed Ibn Husayn.

Another view claims that the Hawza 'Ilmiyya in Najaf, Iraq was established in 430 AH (the 11th century AD) by Shaykh al-Tusi (385 AH/995 CE – 460 AH/1067 CE), and continued as a center of study until the establishment of modern Iraq in 1921.

At present Ayatollah Sistani heads Hawza 'Ilmiyya Najaf, which includes two other Ayatollahs - Mohammad Ishaq Al-Fayyad and Bashir al-Najafi. After witnessing a peak of some 20,000 students in the 60s, then around 3000 because of the State repression, since 2003, the Najaf hawza has now more than 13,000 students, while the curriculum has been updated to include many modern subjects as well as interfaith and inter-sectarian initiatives.

== Hawza 'Ilmiyya Qom ==
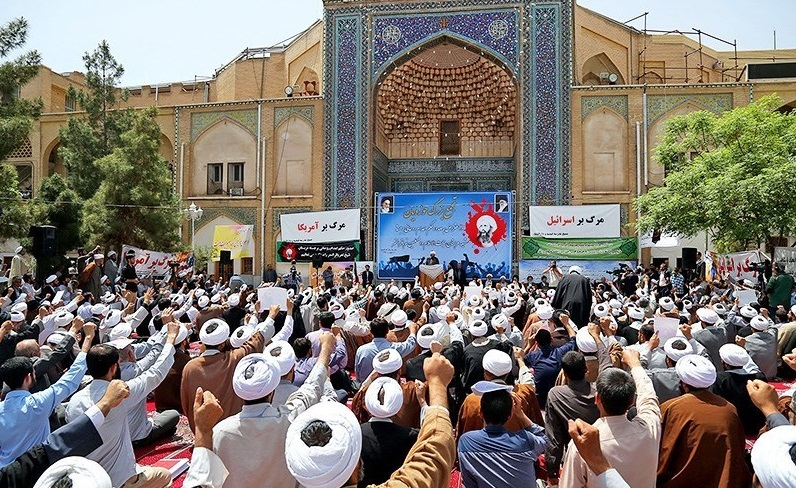
Qom Seminary

Although large Shi'a academies existed in Qom dating back as early as 10th century CE, the hawza of the city became prominent at the time of the Safavids when Shi'a Islam became the official religion of Iran. The famous teachers of that era included Mulla Sadra and Shaykh Bahai. The modern Qom hawza (since 1340 AH/1921 CE) was revitalized by Abdul Karim Haeri Yazdi and Grand Ayatollah Borujerdi and is barely a century old. As of 1975, major madrasas in Qom which offered religious education included

- Ḥaqqānī (founded 1964),
- the traditional Fayżīya,
- Ḵān,
- Ḥojjatīya, and
- Rażawīya,

traditional madrasas which incorporate some modern elements in the curricula include:

- Dār al-tablīḡ (1965),
- Golpāyegānī (1965), and
- Imam Amīr-al-Moʾmenīn (1975),

Since the revolution of 1979 new madrasas have been founded in Qom, including

- MaʿṢūmīya and
- Maktab-e Zahrā.

== Hawza 'Ilmiyya Khwaharan (Women's Hawza) ==
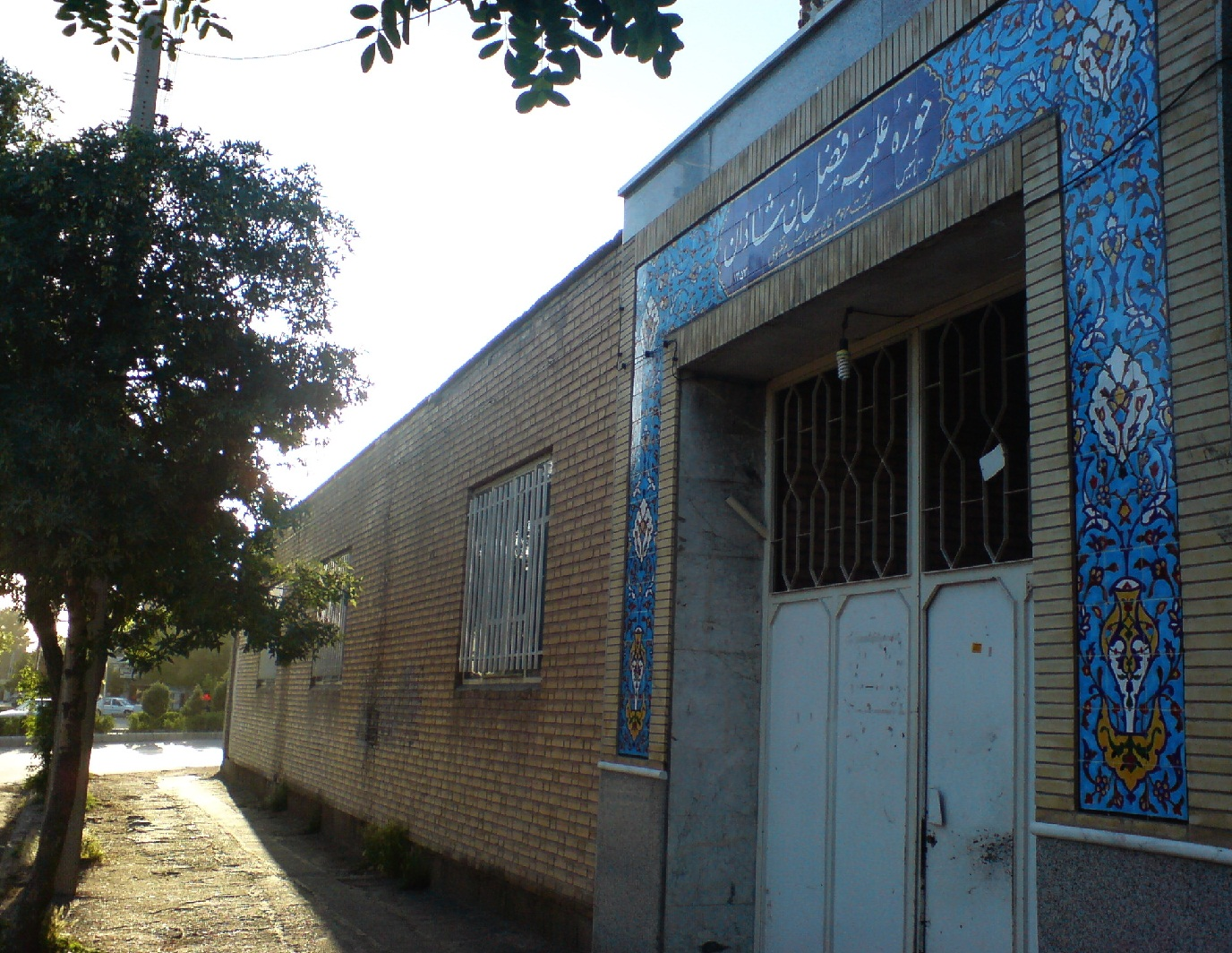
Hawza in Nishapur.

There are also a number of women's hawza, mostly located in Iran. Already in the early 1800s, the Salehiyya madrasa in Qazvin ran a women's section where several female mujtahids were trained. In Qom, the earliest seminary for women was established by the grand ayatollah Mohammad Kazem Shariatmadari, who in 1973 added a women's section to his hawza Dar al-Tabligh, called Dar al-Zahra. Next, the Haghani school opened a women's wing in 1974/75, called Maktab-e Tawhid.

Outside Qom, women's seminaries included Maktab-e Fatema of Fasa (opened in 1961), Maktab-e Zahra of Shiraz (opened in 1964), Maktab-e Fatimah of Isfahan (opened by Lady Amin in 1965), Zahra-i Athar of Tehran (opened in 1966), and Madrase-ye 'Elmīyya Narges of Mashhad (opened in 1966).

After the 1979 revolution in Iran, the state began to centralize the women's hawza system. The women's seminaries in Qom were centralized into one large school, the Jamiat al-Zahra. In Khorasan with its clerical center of Mashhad, the women's maktabs came under the aegis of the state-run Centre for Management of Women's Seminaries of Khorasan. In the rest of the country, women's seminaries were integrated into the Centre for Management of Women's Seminaries (Markaz-e Modiriat-e Ḥawzahā-ye ʿElmiyya Khwaharān). Since the mid-1990s the latter center has established more than 300 seminaries across Iran (before the revolution less than a dozen existed in the entire country).

== Hawza 'Ilmiyya in the West ==
There are also a number of ḥawzah in the West particularly in the United Kingdom. One of longest established hawza in the UK is Al-Mahdi Institute (AMI). Founded in 1993 by Shaykh Arif Abdulhussain, who received ijāza of ijtihād from Ayatollah Hussain Amini and Ayatollah Professor Sayyid Mostafa Mohaghegh Damad, Al-Mahdi Institute began as an Islamic educational institute (hawza) with the objective of combining traditional seminarian scholarship with modern academic study approaches.

The Hawza Programme is at the core of AMI's educational offerings. Modeled on the curriculums of the ḥawzah of Qom and Najaf, it offers training in classical Islamic sciences, employing a critical and academic approach. Courses are primarily taught in English with Arabic language instruction. The programme culminates in eligibility for a Master's degree in Islamic Studies from the University of Birmingham. Additionally, AMI's 'Transfer Student Scheme' enables students from other Islamic institutions to also join the programme and pursue the MA degree.

== Teaching Method ==
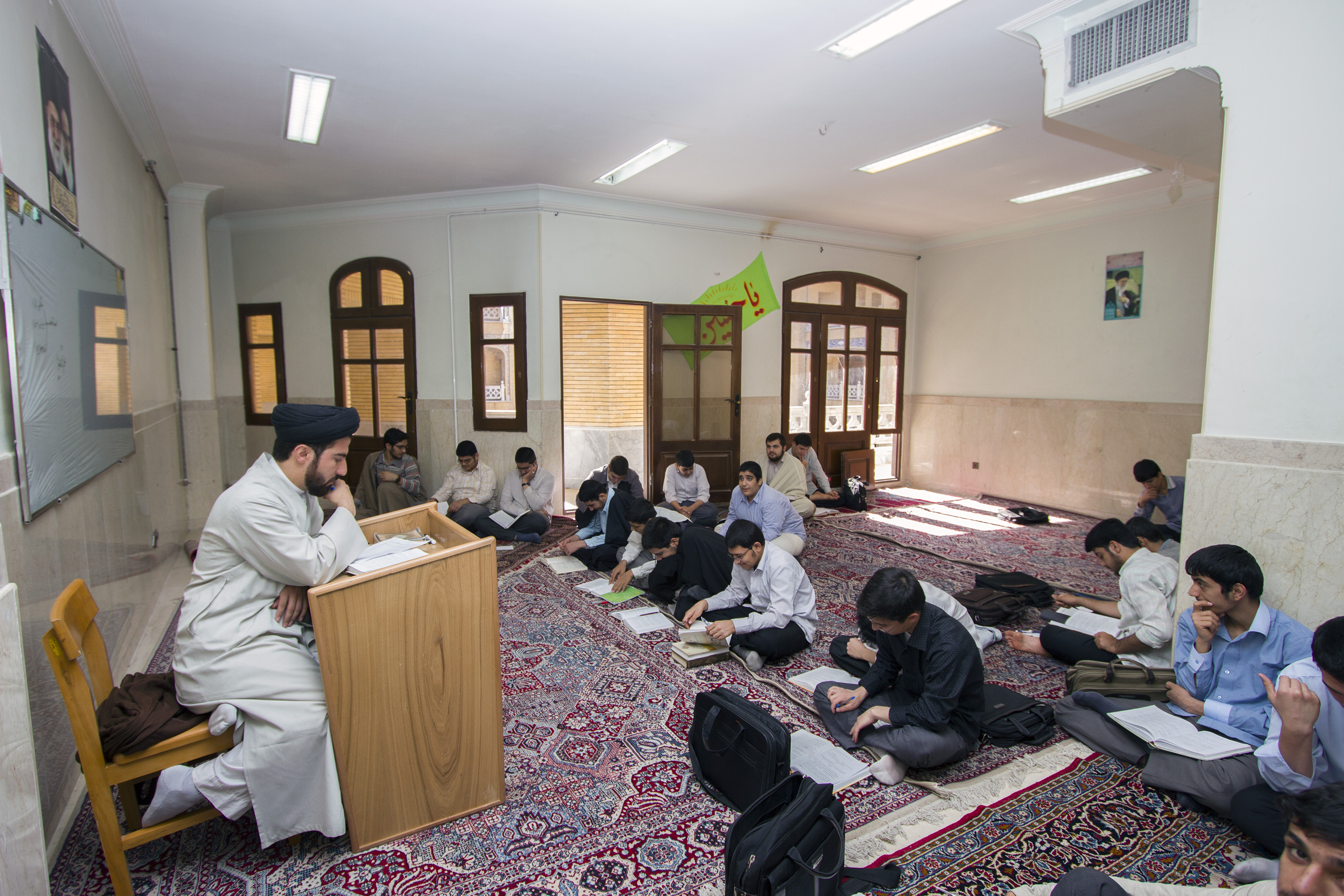
Teaching method in Qom

The teaching approach in the Hawza ʿIlmiyya is generally uniform across Shi'a centers, though it has undergone slight changes in modern times. It does not follow conventional educational systems but rather operates in a traditional manner.

Hawza education is not structured into formal classroom grades. Instead, it is conducted through study circles, a method that has remained unchanged since the time of Shaykh Tusi. There are no formal examinations or certificates; rather, students choose their study materials, teachers, and even the location and time of lessons through mutual agreement.

Over the past four decades, there have been calls for reforming the teaching methods in the Hawza ʿIlmiyya. However, a significant segment of scholars insist on preserving the traditional system. A middle-ground perspective advocates for a combination of old and new approaches.

== Academic Stages in the Hawza ʿIlmiyya ==
The curriculum is divided into three stages:

- The introductory stage (muqaddimat), equivalent to primary education.
- The intermediate stage (sutuḥ), equivalent to secondary education.
- The advanced stage (dars al-khārij), equivalent to higher education.

== Stage One: Muqaddimāt (Introductory Studies) ==
In this stage, students focus on subjects such as Arabic grammar, rhetoric, logic, Islamic jurisprudence (fiqh), and principles of jurisprudence (uṣūl al-fiqh). Common textbooks include:

- Grammar and Morphology:
  - Ajurrūmiyya by Ibn Ājurrūm.
  - Qaṭr al-Nadā wa-Ball al-Ṣadā by Ibn Hishām.
  - Alfiyya of Ibn Mālik with commentaries such as Sharḥ Ibn ʿAqīl.
- Rhetoric and Eloquence:
  - Al-Muṭawwal by Masʿūd ibn ʿUmar al-Taftazānī.
  - Jawāhir al-Balāgha by Aḥmad ibn Ibrāhīm al-Hāshimī.
- Logic:
  - Sharḥ al-Risāla al-Shamsiyya by Quṭb al-Dīn al-Rāzī.
  - Al-Manṭiq by Muḥammad Riḍā al-Muẓaffar.

== Second Stage (Intermediate Studies) ==
In the second stage, students focus on analytical studies in jurisprudence, legal theory (usul), and philosophy.

The standard method of instruction involves selecting a specialized textbook in the relevant field. The teacher reads a passage, explains its meaning, addresses potential ambiguities, and discusses counterarguments. Students then present their comments or objections, and the teacher either corrects their views or acknowledges valid points.

This stage is characterized by a reasoning-based (istidlali) approach.

== Third Stage (Advanced Research Stage) ==
This stage is called the Dars al-Kharij or "external studies" stage as study takes place beyond standard textbooks used by the professor in preparing lessons for this phase. The student transitions into the final stage of their academic journey at Najaf, having explored broad horizons of Islamic thought.

Student Responsibility in This Stage

In this stage, the responsibility for preparation and study lies with the student themselves, without being restricted to any specific scientific source. The student prepares the lecture material themselves—whether it be in jurisprudence, legal theory, exegesis, or hadith—before attending the lecture. The student then reviews the opinions of scholars on the topic, considers possible supporting evidence, and explores potential counterarguments. The goal is for the student to form their own independent view on the issue.

Once the preparation is complete, the student attends the *research outside the texts* sessions. These are study circles led by senior scholars, and multiple circles may be held simultaneously. The professor (a mujtahid) delivers lectures on a selected topic in jurisprudence, legal theory, Quranic exegesis, or hadith. A mujtahid may have two lectures a day: the morning lecture could focus on fiqh (jurisprudence), while the evening lecture might cover usul al-fiqh (legal theory), or vice versa. Some scholars may specialize in a single field.

== Ijtihad Certification ==
Students who reach the level of ijtihad (independent legal reasoning) and demonstrate proficiency in deriving Islamic rulings may receive a certificate of ijtihad from their instructors. This marks their transition into senior scholarly ranks.

== Hawza subjects ==
Hawza students begin their studies by learning fiqh, kalam, hadith, tafsir, philosophy, natural and abstract sciences as well as Arabic and Arabic literature. Once these studies have been completed, they may begin preparation to become a mujtahid by studying advanced old textbooks known as sat'h, and research courses known as kharij.

Subjects studied at the hawza may include the following:

1. Falsafa (Islamic philosophy)
2. Fiqh (jurisprudence)
3. 'Ilm al-Hadith (Hadith sciences)
4. Ilm al-Kalam (theology)
5. 'Ilm ar-Rijal (evaluation of biographies)
6. 'Irfan (Islamic mysticism)
7. Mantiq (Logic)
8. Lugha (language studies)
9. Tafsir al-Qur'an (interpretation of the Qur'an)
10. Tarikh (history)
11. 'Ulum al-Qur'an (Qur'anic studies)
12. Usul al-Fiqh (principles of jurisprudence)

== Advanced subjects ==
Once the basic studies have been completed, students may begin preparation to become a mujtahid by studying advanced ancient textbooks known as sat'h, and research courses known as kharij.

To become a mujtahid, one must master the subjects taught throughout the hawza curriculum, including Muqad'dim'maat, Sotooh, Sotooh 'Ulya, 'Uloom Ukhra, and Bahath Kharij.

Bahath-e Kharij is the last level of hawzah and this level leads to Marja'iya, to become a marja' one has to teach dars-e khaarij for considerable amount of time, publish collection of juridical edicts (risala 'amaliyya) and become recognised as one (by established Maraji).

== Titles in the Hawza ==
These titles, used in seminaries affiliated with the Shia school of thought, indicate specific scholarly ranks. They are granted by religious authorities or recognized scholars.

The main titles include:

- Allamah – A title given to exceptional scholars. In jurisprudence, it refers to Hasan ibn Yusuf ibn al-Mutahhar al-Hilli (d. 726 AH), a major scholar and author of numerous works.
- Muhaqqiq – A title given to scholars known for their deep investigative work. It is commonly associated with Abu al-Qasim Najm al-Din Ja‘far ibn al-Hasan al-Hilli (d. 676 AH), author of Shara'i‘ al-Islam and al-Mu‘tabar.
- Ayatollah – Given to scholars who have reached the level of ijtihad (independent legal reasoning) and are recognized for their expertise.
- Marja'/Grand Ayatollah – A title for high-ranking clerics who serve as sources of emulation (taqlid) for followers.
- Hujjat al-Islam – A title similar in meaning to Hujja, used for respected scholars.
- Imam – A title used for highly influential scholars like Ruhollah Khomeini and Abul al-Qasim Khoei.
- Shaykh al-Islam – Used for figures such as Muhammad Baqir ibn Muhammad Taqi al-Majlisi.
- Leader of the Hawza (Za‘im al-Hawza al-Ilmiyya) – A title used in modern times, notably for Hossein Wahid Khorasani and Abu al-Qasim Khoei.
- Shaykh al-Ta’ifa – A title given to Muhammad ibn al-Hasan al-Tusi as well as Murtadha al-Ansari, two foundational figures in Shia jurisprudence.

== See also ==
- Marja'
- Madrasa
- Lists of maraji
- List of current maraji
- Qom Seminary
- Society of Seminary Teachers of Qom
- Hawza Najaf
