= Zohreh Sefati =

Iranian Mujtahida

Mujtahideh Zohreh Sefati

Personal details
- Spouse: Ayatollah Mohammad Hassan Ahmadi Faqih

Ayatollah Zohreh Sefati is a female Mujtahida. Sefati is a member of the Women's Socio-Cultural Council and a representative to the Supreme Council of Cultural Reforms.

== Personal and Education Life ==
Sefati was raised in a religious family. She was born in Abadan, Iran in 1948. She studied her high school-level subjects at home before attending theology school in 1966. Sefati took preliminary lessons in jurisprudence, literature and Islamic sciences in Abadan. In 1970, she left to attend Qom Theology School to continue her studies. She was a student of renowned scholars such as Ayatollah Shahidi, Ayatollah Haqqi, Ayatollah Ali Meshkini and Ayatollah Mohammad Hassan Ahmadi Faqih (who was her husband).

Sefati achieved the highest jurisprudence degree (Ijtihad), an accomplishment made only by a small number of women. Her Ijtihad degree was approved by several ayatollahs, including Ayatollahs Ali Yari Gharavi-Tabrizi (a student of Ayatollah Naeini), Safi Gulpaygani, Fazel Lankarani, and Mohammad Hassan Ahmadi Faqih.

== Work ==
Sefati has also co-founded a theology school for women in Qom, which later became known as Maktab-e Tawhid. Sefati was one of the 3,000 exemplary women commended by Iranian President Mahmoud Ahmadinejad and received (and accepted) a plaque of honor from the president in October 2006.

Sefati has two brothers. One is Gholāmḥusayn Ṣefātī-Dezfūlī (1952–1977), who was a member of the radical anti-capitalist group “Manṣūrān.” Her other brother, Īraj Ṣefātī-Dezfūlī (b. 1940), represented the city of Abadan in the first and fifth Majlis (Iranian parliament) and was a member of the Majlis’ Supreme Audit Court.

Sefati and some male jurists, such as Yousef Saanei, believe a female mujtahid can become a source of emulation (a marja), i.e. that both men and women can perform taqlid (emulation) of a woman mujtahid. Most Shiite mujtahids, however, believe that women cannot become marja.

== See also ==
- Lady Amin
- Amina Bint al-Majlisi
- Iftikhār al-Tujjar
- Zīnah al-Sādāt Humāyūnī
