= Jamiat al-Zahra =

Seminary for Muslim women in Iran

Jami'at al-Zahra is the largest seminary for Muslim women in the Islamic world. It is located in Qom, Iran.

Jami'at al-Zahra of Qom has an area of 25 hectares and 171,000 square meters of infrastructure, which hosts 13,000 students from 100 countries. Imam Reza School of Al-Zahra University with an area of 29,000 square meters and has 210 classrooms equipped with advanced and modern educational equipment. Hazrat Masoumeh Research Institute of Al-Zahra University with an area of 5261 square meters has 5 research groups and more than 50 official researchers. Hazrat Masoumeh Library of Al-Zahra University has 85,000 volumes of books with a study hall for 1,500 people. Hoda Al-Zahra University's Non-Profit Theology and Islamic Studies Faculty has 10 undergraduate and graduate courses and 330 students from Iran and 20 countries around the world. Hoda non-profit educational complex has 5 schools at the preschool, primary, first and second secondary levels and five secondary levels of Islamic education with a capacity of 2000 students. Shkoufeh Kindergarten with an area of 3000 square meters has 40 classes and a capacity of 1000 children of different nationalities. Shahideh Fahmieh Siari Sports Complex has a very diverse capacity for the general citizens of Qom. Islamic Awakening Hall with an area of 3110 square meters and a capacity of 1400 people as the largest conference hall in Qom province. Hazrat Khadija's dormitory with 17100 square meters and a capacity of 1500 people. It is interesting to know that Al-Zahra University separately has a transportation terminal with an area of 10,500 square meters and a capacity of 80 buses with a capacity of transporting 7,000 people per day. Publications, consulting center, studio, 5 amphitheater halls; Specialized health care with special facilities such as doctor and nurse and constant presence of an ambulance with 24-hour service and no holidays, bank branch, consulate to carry out consular affairs for foreign students without the need to go to the embassy in Tehran, post center and real stores. Virtual is only a part of Al-Zahra University's facilities. In its seminary section, this institution has 7 seminaries, 1 Persian language teaching school for foreigners, which is one of the official Persian language teaching schools and has a license and approval from the Ministry of Science, 2 non-attendance and virtual educational and training units, and 6 specialized centers that are currently It currently covers 15,000 students of different nationalities from 100 countries. That is why this is the largest seminary for women in the Islamic world (even the world). The seminary teaches female students only, both Iranian and foreign. Most students attend the college, though distance learning is also possible. If they are single, students may reside in the dormitories associated with Jami'at al-Zahra. Otherwise, they live at home.

Jami'at al-Zahra was founded in 1984 to unite several women's seminaries in Qom, including Maktab-e Ali, Maktab-e Tawhid (the women's wing of the Haqqani seminary), and Dar al-Zahra (the women's wing of grand ayatollah Shariatmadari's Dar al-Tabligh), which had all opened in the 1970s.

From the beginning of its establishment until today, 64,000 students have graduated from there, and now 25,000 students from more than 100 countries are studying there. Many religious women enter Jami'at al-Zahra today, because "there is less competition to enter these [religious] schools than to enter the universities, for which students need to pass the barrier of the national concour (the national entrance exam)."

Teachers at Jami'at al-Zahra include Rahim Ra’ouf, Fariba Alasvand and Farideh Mostafavi (Khomeini's daughter).

A sister seminary was established in Lucknow, India, within the 20th century. It is the largest seminary of female Shia students in India.

== Websites ==
- http://www.j-alzahra.org/
