= Shahid Qoddoosi High School =

Secondary school in Iran

Information
- Gender: Boys
- Affiliation: National Organization for Development of Exceptional Talents

Shahid Qoddusi High School is located in Qom, Iran, and named after Ayatollah Qoddusi.

== See also ==
- Haghani Circle
