= Makhzan al-Irfan fi Tafsir al-Quran =

15-volume Twelver Shia tafsir

- Author: Banu Amin (Sayyedeh Nusrat Begum Amin al-Tujjar Isfahani)
- Original title: مخزن العرفان في تفسير القرآن
- Language: Persian
- Subject: Qur'anic exegesis (Tafsir)
- Genre: Islamic studies
- Publication place: Iran
- Media type: Print (Hardcover)
- Pages: 15 volumes

Makhzan al-Irfan fi Tafsir al-Quran is a 15 volume tafsir by the Twelver Shia Islamic scholar and the only mujtahida of 20th century Banu Amin.
