= Ashraf Mazandarani =

Late Safavid Persian poet and calligrapher

Mohammad Sa'id Ashraf Mazandarani (b.1620 in Mazandaran, Iran– d. 1704 in Munger in Mughal India; Persian: محمدسعید بن محمدصالح اشرف مازندرانی), commonly known as Ashraf Mazandarani (Persian: اشرف مازندرانی), was one of the last prominent Persian poets and calligraphers at the court of Mughal India. He was born into a scholarly family in Mazandaran, a northern province of Safavid Iran.His father, Mohammad Salih al-Mazandarani, was a famous Shia Islamic scholar and jurist and his mother, Amina Begum Bint al-Majlisi, was a female Safavid mujtahideh.

== Sources ==
- Dale, Stephen Frederic (2003). "A Safavid Poet in the Heart of Darkness: The Indian Poems of Ashraf Mazandarani". Iranian Studies. 36 (2): 197–212. doi:10.1080/00210860305242. JSTOR 4311522. S2CID 162239017. (registration required)
- Sharma, Sunil (2011). "Ashraf Māzandarānī". In Fleet, Kate; Krämer, Gudrun; Matringe, Denis; Nawas, John; Rowson, Everett (eds.). Encyclopaedia of Islam (3rd ed.). Brill Online. ISSN 1873-9830.
