= Mohammad Hadi Mazandarani =

Iranian calligrapher and author

Mohammad Hadi Mazandarani was a prominent author and calligrapher of the late Safavid period. He was also known by the names Agha Hadi (lit. Master Hadi; Persian: آقا هادی) and Hadi Motarjem (lit. Hadi the translator; Persian: هادی مترجم). He was recognized among scholars and ascetics of his time.

== Life ==
Mazandarani was born in Isfahan. His father, Mohammad Salih al-Mazandarani, was a Shia Islamic scholar and jurist from the village of Tilek in the Chahardangeh district of Sari. His mother, Amina Bint al-Majlisi, was a distinguished woman who achieved the status of a mujtahid in Isfahan. His maternal grandfather, Mohammad Taqi Majlesi, was a renowned Shia scholar during the Safavid era and a disciple of Sheikh Baha'i. Mohammad Taqi Majlesi was also the father of Mohammad-Baqer Majlesi.

Mohammad Hadi Mazandarani was a contemporary and follower of Aqa Ebrahim Qomi's style in Naskh calligraphy. He spent his life in Isfahan, where he died during the Afghan invasion in 1135 AH. Another account suggests that he died in 1120 AH and states that his burial site is in the mausoleum of Allameh Majlesi in Isfahan.

== Literary works ==
- Hashyeh Tafsir Bayzavi (Persian: حاشیهٔ تفسیر بیضاوی)
- Anwar al-Balagha' (Persian: انوارالبلاغه)
- Translation of Al-Sahifa al-sajjadiyya (Persian: ترجمهٔ صحیفهٔ سجادیه)
- commentary on Al-Sahifa al-sajjadiyya (Persian: شرح صحیفهٔ سجادیه)
