= Mohammad Salih al-Mazandarani =

Safavid era Persian scholar and jurist

Muḥammad Sāliḥ al-Māzandarānī (, d. 1675 CE, 1086 AH; Persian: محمد صالح المازندراني), He was Shia Islamic scholar and jurist, He was the author of a ten-volume commentary, Sharḥ Uṣūl al-Kāfī, on the first of the Four Books (hadiths) of Shi'a Islam (al-Kafi, written by Kulayni, d. 941 CE / 329 AH).

Mohammad Sa'id Ashraf Mazandarani, Persian poet and calligrapher and Mohammad Hadi Mazandarani, Persian author were his sons.

== Early life and education ==
He lived in city of Isfahan, He received a religious education from Mulla Mohammad Taqi Majlesi (The First Majlesi, 1594–1660 AD, 1002–1070 AH) father of Mohammad-Baqer Majlesi, He married scholar Amena Begum (daughter of Mohammad Taqi Majlesi), He also was student of Mulla Hassan Ali bin Abdullah Al-Tusturi and his Father Mulla Abdullah Al-Tusturi and Sheikh Baha'i, He gained a high position in religious science and jurisprudence, and he was one of the famous scholars, And praised by many scholars such as Ardebili in ''Jami' al-Ruwah'', Al-Hurr al-Amili in ''Amal al-āmil''.

== Works ==
- Sharḥ Uṣūl al-Kāfī and Rawdah al-Kafi (Explanation of “Usul al-Kafi” and Rawdah al-Kafi by Al-Kulayni), and his son sheikh Mohammad Hadi completed his father's work in Explanation of “Kitab al-Kafi” by writing explanation of ''Furu' al-Kafi''
- Explanation of “Man La Yahduruhu al-Faqih” by Saduq
- Explanation of “Ma'alem al-Usul” in Principles of jurisprudence by Al-Hassan Bin Al-Shahid II
- Explanation of “Zubdat al-Usul” in Principles of jurisprudence by Baha' al-din al-'Amili
- Commentary of ''Ar-Rawda-l-Bahiyah fi Sharh allam'a-d-Dimashqiya'' in jurisprudence by Al-Shahid II
- Explanation of ''Al-Daridia poem''

== Died ==
He died 1086 AH (1675/1676 CE), Buried next to Mulla Mohammad Taqi Majlesi in Isfahan, Iran.

== See also ==
- Kitab al-Kafi
- List of hadith authors and commentators
- Sources of sharia
