= Mohammad Hassan Ahmadi Faqih =

Iranian Twelver Shi'a Marja

Grand Ayatollah Mirza Mohammad Hassan Ahmadi Faghih
- ميرزا محمد حسن احمدى فقيه

Personal life
- Born: 1951 Iran
- Died: August 28, 2010 (aged 58–59) Yazd, Iran
- Resting place: Fatima Masumeh Shrine, Qum
- Spouse: Zohreh Sefati
- Occupation: Marja'
- Website: www.ahmadi-faqih.net

Religious life
- Religion: Shia Islam
- Sect: Twelver Shiism

Ayatollah Mirza Mohammad Hassan Ahmadi Faghih (Persian: ميرزا محمد حسن احمدى فقيه) (born 1951 - died August 28, 2010) was an Iranian Twelver Shi'a Marja.

He studied in seminaries of Qum, Iran under Grand Ayatollah Mohammad-Reza Golpaygani and Mohammad Ali Araki. He was the husband of mujtaheda Zohreh Sefati.

== See also ==
- List of maraji
- List of deceased maraji
