= Ali Qoddusi =

Iranian Ayatollah (1927–1981)

Ali Qoddusi (Persian: علی قدوسی) (also Ghoddosi or Qodusi) (1927–1981) was an Iranian cleric and a major actor in the 1979 revolution.

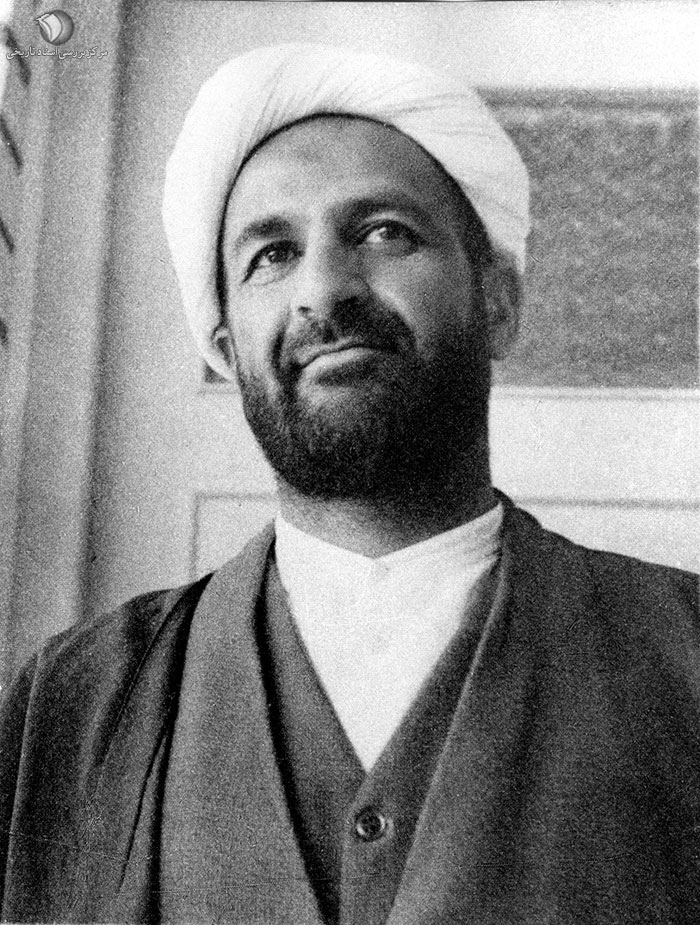
An image of the late Ayatollah Shahid Ali Qoddusi

Qoddusi was born in 1927 in the province of Hamadan. He joined the Qom seminaries in 1944 and studied with, among others, grand ayatollah Hossein Borujerdi. His particular interests in his studies were ethics (akhlaq) and spirituality. Organizationally, he was eager to modernize the educational system of the hawza and to make the hawza again politically relevant.

In 1964, he co-founded the Haqqani School, a Shiite seminary in Qom, from which many of the Islamic Republic's political elites were later recruited. Qoddusi was active in the struggle against the Shah, in particular in 1963 when the Shah sought to condemn Khomeini to death, but then instead decided to merely exile him. In 1966, Qoddusi was imprisoned for a short time in Qezel Qaleh Prison.

In the 1970s, Qoddusi became the director of the Haqqani School, where in 1973/74 he opened a women's section for the training of female religious authorities. The women's section became known as Maktab-e Tawhid.

Ayatollah Qoddusi was married to Najma Sādāt Tabātabā'ī, the daughter of Allameh Tabatabai. Together they had two daughters and four sons, one of whom, Muhammad Hasan, died in the Iran–Iraq War.

After the revolution, Khomeini appointed Qoddusi as Attorney General. Shortly after, he was killed in a bomb explosion in his office on September 5, 1981.

== See also ==
- Shahid Qoddoosi High School
- Mohammad Ali Naseri

== Biographies ==
- Biography of Martyr Ayatollah Ali Quddusi and Yare Quddusian, a Look at Martyr Quddusi’s Life, Islamic Revolution Document Center.
