= Haghani Circle =

Shi'i school of thought in Iran

Coordinates: 34.6524°N 50.8791°E

Haghani Circle (also Haqqani School) is a Shi'i school of thought in Iran based in the holy city of Qom and formerly headed by Ayatollah Mohammad Taghi Mesbah Yazdi, an influential theologian. The Haghani Circle has its origin in the Haghani seminary, founded in 1964, which previously had been called Muntashiriya. After Ayatollahs Qoddusi and Beheshti, two of the leading members of the circle, were assassinated in 1981, the hawza changed its name to Shahidan Seminary (Martyrs Seminary).

== History ==
The Haghani Seminary was founded by Ayatollah Qoddusi, Ayatollah Mesbah Yazdi, Ayatollah Ahmad Jannati, Ayatollah Beheshti, Ayatollah Sadoughi, and Ayatollah Taleghani. It was originally conceived in a reform effort to strengthen the weight of philosophy in the hawza curriculum. To this effect, Allameh Tabatabai, the father-in-law of Ayatollah Qoddusi, was commissioned to write two introductory works, which he completed in 1970 (Bidayat al-Hikmah) and 1975 (Nikhayat al-Hikmah).

Following the example of Shariatmadari's Dar al-Tabligh which had just opened a girl's section two years prior, in 1975 the Haghani Seminary opened a girls' madrasa, called Maktab-e Tawhid, so that women could receive access to a hawza education as well. In its first year, the girl's madrasa had thirty students and five female teachers.

Today, the school trains clerics with both a traditional and modern curriculum, including a secular education in science, medicine, politics, and Western/non-Islamic philosophy.

The Haghani Seminary has been described as "a kind of Ecole Nationale d'Administration for the Islamic Republic" whose alumni "form the backbone of the clerical management class that runs Iran's key political and security institutions." During Iran's elections it is said to be common for candidates to visit the city to "pay homage" to Haghani religious leaders and "receive their blessing." Another source says "most Haghani people serve either in the security forces or in the military."

According to journalist Tim Rutten "the Haghani is a particularly aggressive school of radical Shiite Islam which lives in expectation of the imminent coming of the Mahdi, a kind of Islamic messiah, who will bring peace and justice -- along with universal Islamic rule -- to the entire world. ... Members ... of this school believe they must act to speed the Mahdi's coming.".

== Members ==
Theologians and figures in Iran's politics after the revolution were associated (as teacher or student) with the Haghani Circle or follows its ideology:

- Ahmad Ahmadi (philosopher)
- Abdollah Javadi Amoli
- Ayatollah Mohammad Beheshti (former Chief Justice)
- Gholam Hossein Mohseni-Ejehei (current Chief Justice and former Minister of Intelligence)
- Ali Fallahian (former Minister of Intelligence)
- Rouhollah Hosseinian (former MP)
- Ahmad Jannati (current Chairman of Guardian Council)
- Gholamhossein Karbaschi (former Mayor of Tehran, not actively involved since the mid 1990s)
- Ahmad Khatami (current Friday prayers Imam of Tehran)
- Mostafa Pourmohammadi (former Minister of Information)
- Mohammad Reyshahri (former Minister of Intelligence and Prosecutor-General of Special Court for the Clergy)
- Yousef Saanei
- Hossein Shariatmadari
- Ali Younesi (former Minister of Intelligence)
- Mojtaba Zonnour

Ayatollah Mohammad Taghi Mesbah Yazdi (The founder of Haghani School) has been the ideological mentor and spiritual guide of ex-President Mahmoud Ahmadinejad.

== See also ==
- Hojjatieh
- Chain Murders of Iran
- History of fundamentalist Islam in Iran
- Council for Spreading Mahmoud Ahmadinejad's Thoughts
- Society of Seminary Teachers of Qom
