= Maktab-e Tawhid =

Maktab-e Tawhid (also Maktab-e Tawhīd) was a Shi'i seminary for women, established in Qom, Iran's clerical center in 1975, as a wing of the Haghani school.

The founding of the seminary followed similar institutions in Qom, Fasa, Shiraz and Isfahan. In Fasa, Maktab-e Fatema was opened in 1961, Maktab-e Zahra in Shiraz in 1964, Maktab-e Fatimah in Isfahan in 1965, in Tehran, Zahra-i Athar was opened in 1966, and in Mashhad, Fatemeh Khamooshi (d. 2010) opened Madrase-ye ‘Elmīyya Narges in the same year.

Ironically, it took a number more years until finally, a women's seminary was established in Qom. Mohammad Kazem Shariatmadari added a women's section to his hawza Dar al-Tabligh, called Dar al-Zahra in 1973.

Partially in order to rival the women's section of the Dar al-Tabligh school, Ayatollah Qoddusi, the director of the Haghani school, set up Maktab-e Tawhid. In its first year, the girl's madrasa had thirty students and five female teachers. These included Monir Gorjih, Masumeh Golgiri, and Zohreh Sefati, who had come to Qom from Abadan earlier in the decade in search of a hawza education.

Among the male lecturers at Maktab-e Tawhid were Sheikh Nematollah Salehi Najafabadi, the author of “Shahid-e Javid,” and Morteza Haeri, the son of Sheikh Abdul-Karim Ha'eri Yazdi. Morteza Ha'eri taught akhlāq at the maktab.

After the 1979 revolution, Maktab-e Tawhid was incorporated together with other women's seminaries in Qom into the larger school, Jamiat al-Zahra.
