= Al-Mahdi Institute =

Islamic seminary in Birmingham, UK

- Motto: An Open Platform for Critical Muslim Scholarship
- Type: Private Higher Education and Research Institute
- Established: 1993
- Founders: Shaykh Arif Abdul Hussain
- Academic affiliations: University of Birmingham
- Location: 60 Weoley Park Road, Birmingham, B29 6RB
- Campus: 4.5 acres
- Website: https://www.almahdi.edu/

Al-Mahdi Institute (AMI) is an independent higher education institute and research organisation located in the Selly Oak area of Birmingham, United Kingdom. Established in 1993, AMI is a Charitable Incorporated Organisation and holds NGO status in Special Consultative Status with the Economic and Social Council (ECOSOC) of the United Nations.

== History ==
Founded in 1993 by Shaykh Arif Abdulhussain, Al-Mahdi Institute began as an Islamic educational institute (hawza) with the objective of combining traditional seminarian scholarship with modern academic study approaches. Prior to founding AMI, Shaykh Arif completed his seminary education at Madrassa al-Sayyid al-Khūʾī in London and Qom, before receiving ijāza of ijtihād from Ayatollah Hussain Amini and Ayatollah Professor Sayyid Mostafa Mohaghegh Damad.

In its initial years, AMI underwent multiple relocations to accommodate its growing student body, range of activities, and expanding library resources. These moves were driven by the need for more space and financial considerations. In 2011, AMI acquired the former College of Ascension building on Weoley Park Road, a structure dating back to 1923 and previously used as an Anglican missionary training college. Since then, this site has become AMI's permanent home, facilitating the expansion of its educational and research activities.

== Education ==
The Hawza Programme is at the core of AMI's educational offerings. Modeled on the curriculums of the traditional Shi'a seminaries in Qom and Najaf, it offers training in classical Islamic sciences, employing a critical and academic approach. Courses are primarily taught in English with Arabic language instruction.

Originally conducted on-site at AMI's campuses, the programme transitioned to fully online delivery with pre-recorded lectures and live classes during the COVID-19 pandemic in 2020. The online format has since continued, and in September 2022, the programme was restructured into four levels of study. Level one introduces students to the foundational subjects like Qur'anic exegesis, hadith studies, Islamic law, legal theory, theology, philosophy, and mysticism. This progresses to advanced studies in philosophy, jurisprudence, legal theory, and mysticism over the course of the programme. Students also develop their Arabic proficiency and engage with core Islamic texts throughout the programme.

The programme culminates in eligibility for a Master's degree in Islamic Studies from the University of Birmingham. Additionally, AMI's 'Transfer Student Scheme' enables students from other Islamic institutions to join the programme and pursue the MA degree.

== Research ==
AMI's research efforts are focused on addressing practical issues faced by Muslims living in the West, as well as engaging in critical discussions surrounding the theoretical and theological issues in Islamic thought. Its research combines traditional seminary teachings with modern academic approaches to the study of Islam and Muslim societies. This enables the production of research that is relevant to seminary environments, academic circles, and the wider society. AMI's research is spread across six departments: Islamic Legal Studies, Islamic Philosophy and Theology, Qur'anic Studies, Hadith and History, Mysticism and Spirituality, and Studies in Comparative Religion.

== Publications ==
Established in 2013, AMI Press serves as the publishing house of Al-Mahdi Institute. It focuses on publishing academic works related to Islam, with a particular emphasis on Shi'i studies. The objective of AMI Press is to provide insights into the cultural, social, and intellectual history of Shia Muslims across various historical periods. Its publications range from translations of works by prominent Shi'i scholars like al-Allama al-Hilli to collections of proceedings from workshops and conferences organised by AMI.

== Affiliations ==
AMI is affiliated with grass-roots research centers that focus on producing resources for Muslim communities. These resources are intended to address contemporary challenges faced by Muslims in the West and promote dialogue between different Muslim schools of thought. AMI's collaborations include partnerships with the International Centre for Collective Ijtihād (ICCI), the Centre for Islamic Decrees and Doctrines (Dār al-iftāʾ wa-l aqāʾid), and the Centre for Intra-Muslim Studies (CIMS).

AMI also maintains a collaborative partnership with the University of Birmingham.
