= Iftikhar al-Tujjar =

Iffat al-Zaman Amin (1912 - 1977), also known as Iftikhar al-Tujjar, was a student and niece of Banu Amin, Iran's most prominent female religious scholar of the 20th century.

Iffat al-Zamān Amīn received an ijazah of riwāya in Najaf from Ayatollah Mahmoud Hashemi Shahroudi, who served as the Head of Judiciary of the Islamic Republic of Iran 1999-2009.

Among her works is "chehel hadith-e amin" (forty hadith of Amin), also known as "hashtsad wa bist mou'ezeh".

Iffat al-Zamān Amīn's father was Aḥmad Amīn, the brother of Nusrat Amin's husband and cousin, Haj Mirza, also known as Muīn al-Tujjar, (died 1950s). She also had a great grand aunt who was a mujtaheda, Hāshimīyah al-Tujjar.

== See also ==
- Lady Amin
- Hashimiyah al-Tujjar
- Zohreh Sefati
- Zīnah al-Sādāt Humāyūnī
