= List of hadith authors and commentators =

List of notable compilers of hadiths collections. and authors of Hadith commentaries:

- Muhammad al-Bukhari (194-256 AH)
  - Sahih Bukhari (hadith #1/6 of Kutub al-Sittah), primarily used by Sunni.
- Muhammad ibn Ya'qub al-Kulayni (250-329 AH)
  - Kitab al-Kafi (hadith #1/4 of The Four Books), primarily used by Shi'a Islam.
- Ibn Hajar al-Asqalani (773-852 AH)
  - Fath al-Bari (commentary on Sahih Bukhari), primarily used by Sunni.
- Mohammad Salih al-Mazandarani (d. 1081 AH)
  - Sharh Usul al-Kafi (commentary on Usul al-Kafi, first part of Kitab al-Kafi), primarily used by Shi'a Islam.

For a full list of notable compilers of hadith collections see: List of hadith collections.
