= Khan al-Tujjar =

Khan al-Tujjar (lit. "Merchant's Caravanserai"), spelled variously (also Tudjar, with the definite article spelled either as al, el, at, et, with or without hyphen) may refer to:

- Khan al-Tujjar (Mount Tabor)
- Khan al-Tujjar (Nablus)
