= Haji Rais al-Tujjar =

Past prime minister of Arabistan

Rais al-Tujjar
- Haji Muhammad Ali al-Behbahani
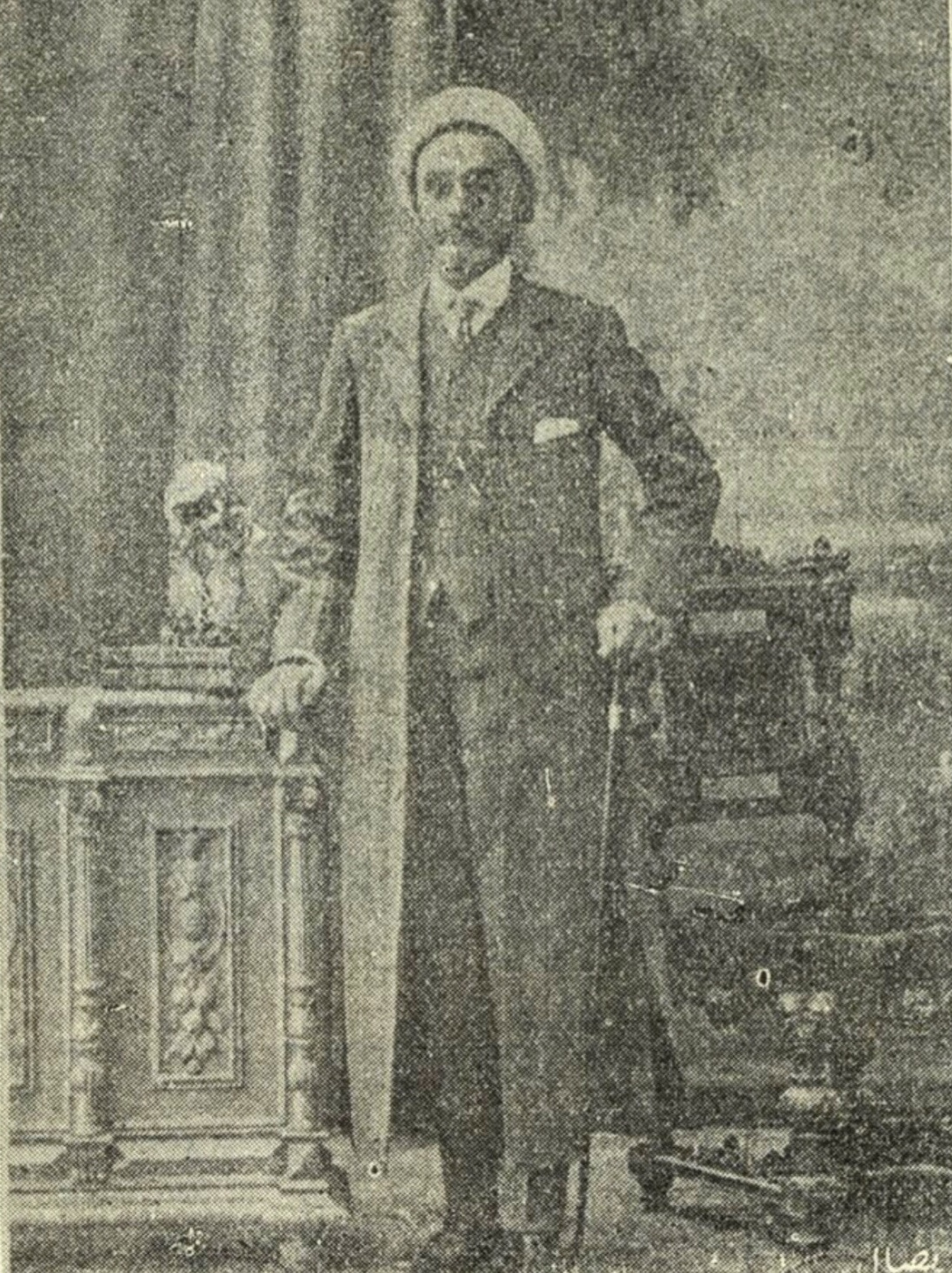

Prime Minister of Arabistan
- In office 2 June 1897 – 24 May 1920
- Monarch: Khaz'al Khan

Advisor on Persian affairs
- In office 2 June 1897 – 24 May 1920

Personal details
- Born: 1848
- Died: Unknown

Haji Muhammad Ali Khan, Rais al-Tujjar, CIE (also known as Haji Rais) was the Prime Minister of Arabistan and chief of its traders. He was also the Sheikh of Mohammerah's advisor on Persian affairs.

== Background ==
Born in Behbahan, Haji Rais belonged to a wealthy family of merchants that traded on the coastal areas of the Persian Gulf and eventually established trade connections with India, under the British Raj. A Consular official described him as an ‘excessively acute’ man and ‘a born diplomatist’. By 1904 he was about 50 years old, ‘weak and fragile’ and had lived in Muhammareh for 20 years. His son, Moshir ut-Tojjar, who was at that time 21, was praised as ‘a worthy son of his father’. Haji Rais himself was a large merchant and grew very rich under Khaz’al over whom he had ‘great influence’.Khaz’al's eldest son and Heir apparent, Sheikh Kasib, was betrothed to Haji Rais’ daughter.

== Official roles and duties ==
When in June 1897, Khaz’al Khan Ibn Haji Jabir Khan succeeded his brother Miz'al as the new Sheikh of Mohammerah, the former duly sent his right-hand man, Haji Rais, to the Persian capital to elicit official recognition. Haji Rais also reached out to the British Legation, whereby they responded that they would do all they could to "protect the Shaikh’s interests, and [that] the Shaikh should in return do all he can to further British interests now and in the future". Eleanor Franklin Egan described him as a wonderful man about five feet five, that made up in loftiness of intelligence what he lacks in physical stature. She further added, that he was the commanding intellect which has stood at the Sheikh’s right hand for more years than most people can remember. In his diaries, Reza Khan Shah of Iran describes Haj Rais as the sheikh's independent minister whom the shaikh consults on all matters of his country.

Shaikh Khazal consults with his independent minister, Hajj Muhammad Ali Behbehani, the head of merchants, regarding all the affairs of his kingdom

— Reza Khan

Haji Rais was, for a brief period, the President of the Khazaliah school in Mohammerah. However, after four years of presidentship, the school was eventually handed over to the British Consul at Mohammerah.

== Honours ==
- (United Kingdom) Honorary Companion of the Order of the Indian Empire (1914)
- (Iran) Order of the Lion and the Sun (1st Class)
