= Lady Amin =

Iranian theologian and mystic (1886–1983)

Lady Mujtahedah Lady Amin
- Born: 1886; Isfahan, Sublime State of Iran
- Died: 1983 (aged 96–97); Isfahan, Iran

Hajiyeh Seyyedeh Nosrat Begum Amin, also known as Banu Amin, Lady Amin (Persian: بانو امين; 1886–1983), was Iran's most outstanding female jurisprudent, theologian and great Muslim mystic (‘arif) of the 20th century, a Lady Mujtahideh. She received numerous ijazahs (permissions) of ijtihad, among them from Ayatollahs Muḥammad Kazim Ḥusayni Shīrāzī (1873–1947) and Grand Ayatullah ‘arif (1859–1937), the founder of the Qom seminaries (hawza).

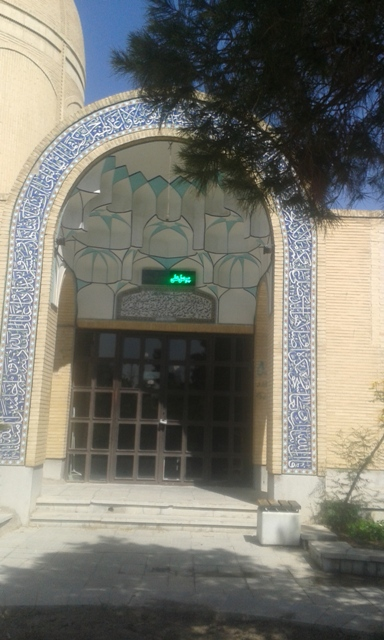
The Tomb of Lady Amin at Isfahan

She also granted numerous ijazahs of ijtihad to female and male scholars, among them Sayyid Mar'ashi Najafi.

She wrote several books about Islamic sciences, among them a tafsir in 15 volumes, and established a maktab in Isfahan in 1965, called Maktab-e Fatimah. The maktab was directed since its inception until 1992 by Banu Amin's most prominent student, Zīnah al-Sādāt Humāyūnī (b. 1917). After 1992, Ḥajj Āqā Ḥasan Imāmi, a relative of Humāyūnī’s, took over the directorship.

Banu Amin was born into a merchant family. Nuṣrat Amīn’s husband was her cousin Haj Mirza, also known as Muīn al-Tujjar. Her father is known by the name of Haj Sayyid Muḥammad ʿAlī Amīn al-Tujjar. His sister Hāshimīyah al-Tujjar was a mujtahidah herself who received ijtihād degrees in fiqh and uṣūl. Further, Nuṣrat Amīn had a niece, Iffat al-Zamān Amīn (1912–1977), also known as Iftikhār al-Tujjar, who was one of her most prominent students and who received an ijazah of riwāya in Najaf by Ayatullah Mahmoud Hashemi Shahroudi.

Banu Amin had eight children, only one of whom survived her (Sayyid Muḥammad ʿAlī Muʿīn Amīn). She was buried at the Takht-e Fulad Cemetery in Isfahan.

== Works ==
- al-Arbaʿīn al-Hāshimīyyah
- Jā̄miʿ al-shatāt
- Al-Nafaḥāt al-Raḥmānīyah fī al-Vāridāt al-Qalbīyah
- Sayr va Sulūk dar Ravish-i Awliyāʼ-i Allāh
- Akhlāq va Rahi Sa‘adat: Iqtibas va tarjamih az Taharat al-Iraqi Ibn Maskuyih
- Ravish-i Khushbakhtī va Tawsīyih bih Khāharān-i Imani
- Makhzan al-ʿirfān dar ʿulūm-i Qurʾān
- Makhzan al-laālī dar fazīlat-i mawlá al-mawālī hazrat-i Alī ibn Abītālib
- Maʿād, yā Ākharīn Sayr-i Bashar

== Biographies and documentation ==
- ʻAmū Khalīlī, Marjān. Kawkab-i durrī: [sharḥ-i ahvāl-i bānū-ye mujtahidah Amīn], (Tehran: Payām-e ʻAdālat, 1379 [2000]).
- Bāqirī Bīdʾhindī, Nāṣir. Bānū-yi nimūnah: gilwahāyī az ḥayāt-i bānū-yi mujtahidah Amīn Iṣfahānī, (Daftar-i Tablīqat-i Islāmī-yi Ḥawzah-yi ʿilmīyah-yi - Islamic Propagation Office of the Religious Seminaries Qom), Markaz-i Intishārāt, Qom 1382 [2003].
- Tayyibī, Nāhīd. Zindagānī-yi Bānū-yi Īrānī: Bānū-yi Mujtahidah Nuṣrat al-Sādāt Amīn, (Qom: Sābiqūn Publishers, 1380 [2001]).
- Majmūʻah-ʾi maqālāt wa sukhanrānīhā-yi avvalīn wa duvumīn Kungrih-ʾi Buzurgdāsht-i Bānū-yi Mujtahidah Sayyidah Nuṣrat Amīn (rah), Markaz-i Muṭālaʻāt wa Taḥqīqāt-i Farhangī, Daftar-i Muṭālaʻāt-i Farhangī-i Bānūwān, Qom, 1995 (1374).
- Yādnāmah-i bānū-yi mujtahidah Nuṣrat al-Sādāt Amīn: mashhūr bih Bānū-yi Īrāni, (Isfahan: Vizārat-i Farhang wa Irshād-i Islāmī; Markaz-i Muṭālaʿāt-i wa Tahqīqāt-i Farhangī, 1371 [1992]).

== See also ==
- Hāshimīyah al-Tujjar
- Zohreh Sefati
- Iftikhār al-Tujjar
- Zīnah al-Sādāt Humāyūnī

== References and notes ==
- Ladan, Rahbari (2020). "Women's Ijtihad and Lady Amin's Islamic ethics on womanhood and motherhood". Religions. 11 (2): 33. doi:10.3390/rel11020088. hdl:1854/LU-8647522.
