= Hashimiyah al-Tujjar =

Hāshimīyah al-Tujjar was a Lady Mujtahideh in 20th century Iran.

She received ijtihād degrees in fiqh and uṣūl. Her niece, the daughter of her brother, became Iran's most prominent female religious intellectual of 20th century Iran, Nosrat Amin of Isfahan.

There are indications that the work of Nosrat Amin titled "al-Arbaʿīn al-Hāshimīyah" may have been begun by Hāshimīyah al-Tujjar.
