= Dar al-Zahra =

Shia seminary in Qom, Iran

Dar al-Zahra was the first women's Shia seminary to be opened in Qom, Iran. It was established by grand ayatollah Mohammad Kazem Shariatmadari, who opened it in 1973 as a section of his hawza Dar al-Tabligh.

By 1975, Dar al-Zahra already counted 150 female students, taught by male teachers from behind a curtain.

With the fall-out between Mohammad Kazem Shariatmadari and Khomeini, the seminary was closed and Shariatmadari was placed under house arrest.

Dar al-Zahra was run by Fatemeh Amini. After Dar al-Tabligh was closed, she opened a number of other women's seminaries in Tehran.
