= Zinah al-Sadat Humayuni =

Zīnah al-Sādāt Humāyūnī (Persian: زینت‌السادات علویه همایونی), also Alavīyah Humāyūnī, Zinatossadat Alevi Homayooni or Homayuni, (1917 - 2 July 2016) was a female religious scholar from Isfahan, Iran, who is the most prominent student of Iran's leading mujtaheda of the 20th century, Banu Amin.

== Biography ==
Humāyūnī is a Shia author, Faqīh and mujtaheda. She was a student of Lady Amin Esfahani. She was the first female theology student in to take her university's entrance exam and was accepted in 1964.

In 1965, she co-founded an Islamic seminary for women, Maktab-e-Fatima with the prominent female scholar, Lady Amin. Humāyūnī served as director of the school and remained in that position until 1992. The establishment of the maktab was first and foremost Humāyūnī's idea. She made key administrative decisions and devised the study program.

When Humāyūnī retired, Ḥajj Āqā Ḥasan Imāmi, a relative of Humāyūnī's, took over the directorship of the school.

Humāyūnī has translated two books from Arabic into Persian and is also the author of two books.

== Recognitions ==
In 2009, she was selected as the face of persistence by the Supreme Leader of Iran.

In 2011, a conference was held in honor of her activities with the messenger of the president of Iran.

== Books ==
- Shakhṣīyat-i Zan (The personality features of woman), Tehran, 1369 [1990].
- Zan mazhar-i khallāqīyat-i Allāh, Tehran, Daftar-i Intishārāt-i Islāmī, 1377 [1998].
- Persian translation of the book Isrār al-Āyāt (The Mysteries of the Qur'ānic verses) by Muḥammad ibn Ibrāhīm Ṣadr al-Din Shīrāzī (1573–1641), Tehran, 1984.
- Persian translation of the book Tarjumah-i Arbaʿīn al-Hāshimīyah by Nusrat Amin, Tehran: Hudá, 1365 [1986].
- Biography of Lady Amin

== Professors ==
- Lady Amin
- Heydar Ali Mohaghegh
- Sadr Koopani
- Noureddine Ashny
