= Dar al-Tabligh =

Historical educational Shiite seminary in Qom

The Dar al-Tabligh was a Shiite seminary in Qom. It was established in the mid-1960s by eminent grand ayatollah Mohammad Kazem Shariatmadari and soon emerged as one of the most popular hawza for Iranian and foreign students, with a prolific publishing outlet.

In 1973, Dar al-Tabligh opened a women's section, called Dar al-Zahra, which by 1975 counted 150 female students, taught by male teachers from behind a curtain.

With the fall-out between Mohammad Kazem Shariatmadari and Khomeini, the seminary was closed and Shariatmadari was placed under house arrest.
