= Ali Karimi Jahromi =

Iranian Grand Ayatollah

Grand Ayatollah Sheikh Ali Karimi Jahromi
- آیت الله العظمی شیخ علی کریمی جهرمی
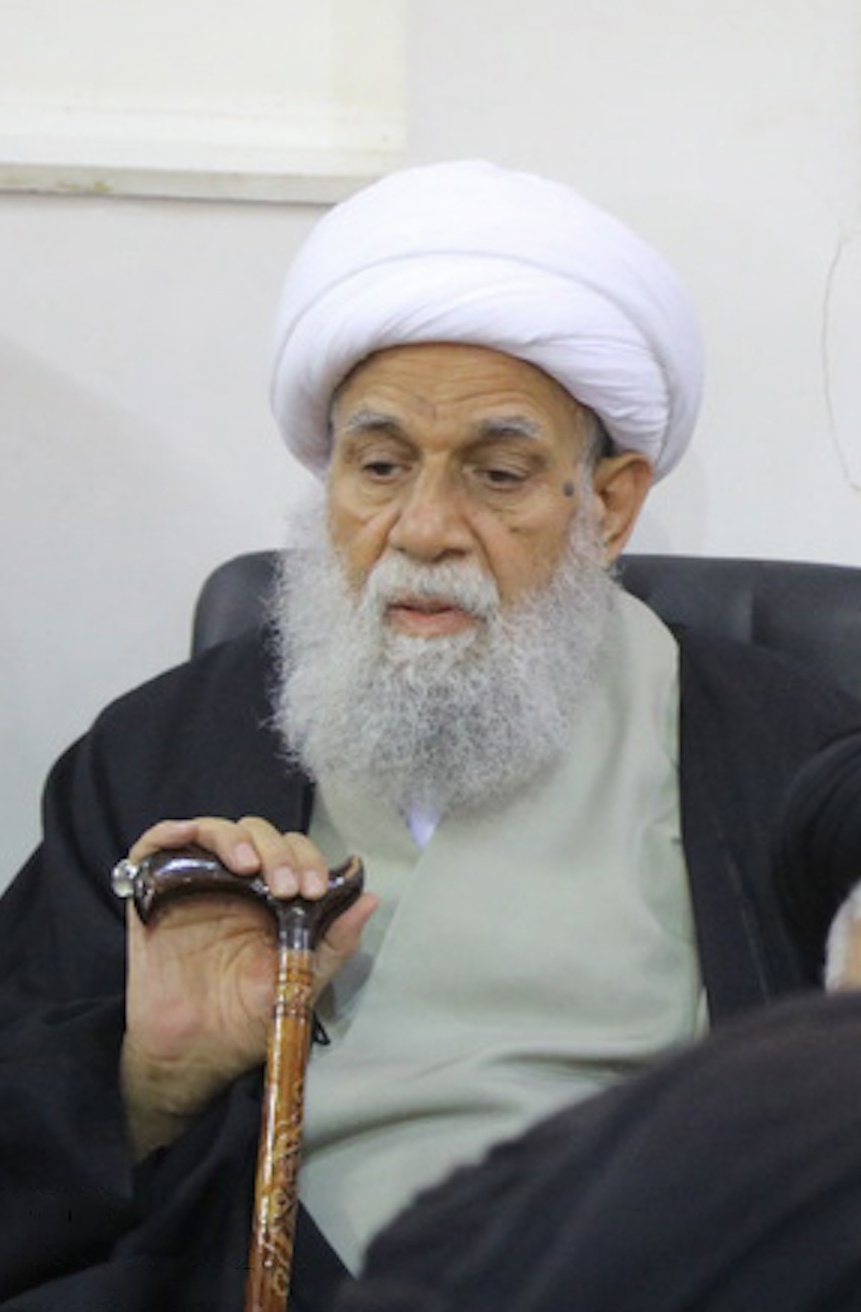
- Title: Grand Ayatollah

Personal life
- Born: Ali Karimi; 10 April 1941 (age 85) Jahrom, Imperial State of Iran
- Education: Qom Hawza
- Relatives: Safi Golpaygani father-in-law
- Website: https://karimijahromi.ir/

Religious life
- Religion: Islam
- Sect: Shia
- Jurisprudence: Twelver, Jaffari

Muslim leader
- Based in: Qom

Ali Karimi Jahromi Persian: علی کریمی جهرمی, is an Iranian Grand Ayatollah. He currently teaches in Qom Seminary, and has attained Ijtihad from Seyed Mohammad Reza Golpaygani, Seyed Shahab ud-Din Mar'ashi Najafi, and Mohammad Ali Araki.

== Early life and education ==
Karimi was born in Jahrom, a city in Fars Province. When he was young he had attended Quran and moral classes from Seyed Mohammad-Ebrahim Haqshenas Jahromi. He continued to stay in Shiraz for some time, where he studied in the Agha Baba Khan Madrasa followed by the Hosseiniyeh Qawam Madrasa. Here he had been taught by the likes of Seyed Mohammad Baqer Ayatollahi, Mohammad Javad Ayatollahi, Mohammad Sadeq Darabi. He partook in the Tafsir classes of Nuruddin Hosseini al-Hashemi Shirazi.

He then migrated to Qom to study in the seminary there. First in the Razaviyeh Madrasa, afterwards attending Seyed Hossein Tabatabai Borujerdi Madrasa. He completed his higher level (level 3 in Seminary standards) courses by the time he was nineteen, which was mainly taught by Seyed Mohammad-Baqer Tabatabai Soltani. After this, he continued to further his Islamic studies by undergoing his Darse Kharej classes, in order to become a Mujtahid. During his advanced Islamic studies, he was taught by prominent scholars such as Seyed Ruhollah Khomeini, Seyed Mohammad-Reza Golpaygani, Seyed Mohammad Kazem Shariatmadari, Mirza Hashem Amoli, Mohammad Ali Araki, Seyed Mohammad Mohaqeq Damad, Morteza Haeri Yazdi, and Abbas Ali Shahroudi.

== Teaching career ==
For 26 years, Karimi was very close and partook in many classes by Mohammad Reza Golpaygani. He documented a plethora of his Darse Kharej lectures in a detailed fashion, which later became published as a book. For around 20 years, he taught Usul Al-Fiqh, with a particular emphasis on Makasib and Kifayat al-Usul. When Golpaygani's classes stopped, Karimi took over teaching Darse Kharej which he does till now. He used to lead Friday prayers in the Fatima Masoomeh Shrine in Qom, as well as the Razavi Mosque. In 1998 he was recognised as the best Quran-researcher in the country, and in 2007 he was honoured as an exemplary professor of the Qom Seminary.

== Personal life ==
Before the 1979 Iranian revolution, Karimi was arrested and banned from giving speeches from the pulpit in several places, such as Ahvaz, Mahshahr, Bushehr, Qom and Tehran. He was one of the students in Qom who signed an open letter to the then prime minister of Iran, Amir-Abbas Hoveyda. He is the son in law of the prominent scholar Lotfollah Safi Golpaygani, and he led his funeral prayers.

== Cultural and Social Activities ==
Since the beginning of his seminary studies, Karimi Jahromi traveled to different regions of Iran and other countries for preaching. He also spent time at the front lines during the eight-year Iran-Iraq War. He gave speeches at domestic and international conferences, including the Congress of Sheikh Ansari and the Congress of Sheikh Mufid.

He helps people in need through the "Mehr-e Hashtom" charity Center.

== Works ==
Some of his works:

- Eldar al-Manzoud Fi Haqam al-Hudood: Lectures on foreign jurisprudence by Ayatollah Azami Golpayegani
- Lectures on al-Shahadat and lectures on al-Qadaa: both in argumentative jurisprudence
- The seal of the province in the sky of Iran: The life of Imam Reza
- The Lady of the Kingdom: The life of Fatima Masoumeh

== See also ==
- List of Ayatollahs
- Quranic studies
- Shia clergy
- Hassan Mortazavi Shahroudi
