= Sayyid Abu al-Fadl Burqaʻi =

Iranian jurist and author (1908–1993)

Sayyid Abu al-Fadl Burqa'i
- سید ابوالفضل ibn الرّضا برقعی
- Portrait of Sayyid Abu al-Fadl Burqa'i

Personal life
- Born: 1908 Qom, Iran
- Died: 1993 (aged 85) Tehran, Iran
- Main interest(s): Qur'an, Hadith, Reformism
- Website: http://www.borqei.com

Religious life
- Religion: Islam
- Denomination: Non-denominational
- Jurisprudence: Independent

Muslim leader
- Disciple of: Abu l-Hasan al-Isfahani, Abol-Ghasem Kashani, Abdul-Karim Haeri Yazdi

Sayyid Abu al-Fadl Burqa'i, known in Persian: سید ابوالفضل ibn الرّضا برقعی, (1908-1993) also known commonly as Al Borqei or Ibn al-Ridah was an Iranian heterodox preacher and non-denominational Islamic scholar.

== Biography ==
Ayatollah Borqei was born in 1908, and was the son of a Shi'ite cleric, Sayyid Ahmad. His family tree is traced directly back to the eighth Shia Imam, Ali al-Rida. The surname "Burqa'i" stems from an ancestral tradition where his forebears were described as exceptionally handsome, prompting them to wear a face-covering (burqa) when appearing in public. His education started at the age of twelve. At adulthood, he gained scholarly knowledge and was a teacher at one of Qom's seminaries. Prior to his departure from Twelver Shiism, he reached the rank of mujtahid (independent jurist) within the Shia clerical hierarchy and composed several volumes defending traditional Twelver doctrine. He later left Shi'ism in his late forties and converted to non-denominational Islam. Following this transition, he explicitly recanted his past views and authored direct refutations against his own earlier publications.

In 1944, he issued a Fatwa stating that anyone who attended the funeral of Reza Shah Pahlavi was a heretic disbeliever who contradicted the laws of religion. His opinion caused the government to redirect the funeral to Tehran instead, and the late Shah was buried in Rey. In the years preceding the 1979 Iranian Revolution, Borqei served as the head minister of a large congregational mosque in Tehran. Unlike mainstream Twelver clerics of that era who did not deem Friday congregational prayers (Juma) obligatory during the Greater Occultation, Borqei actively established and led heavily attended Friday services.

The students of Ayatollah Borqei included Mehdi Hashemi. Borqei's family later left Shi'ism during his lifetime as well. Twelver apologists and media outlets later claimed that Borqei repented and returned to Twelver Shiism prior to his death. His grandson explicitly dismissed these claims as fabrications. In his final written will and testament, Borqei strictly instructed his family to continue publishing, printing, and distributing all of his works aimed at refuting Twelver Shia doctrines.

Borqei died in 1993, and was buried in Tehran. He is buried in the Imamzadeh Shu'ayb mausoleum. He left strict instructions that his grave must remain flat, level with the ground, completely simple, and free from any floral arrangements or elaborate monuments.

== Clerical opposition and assassination attempts ==
Following his open critiques of Twelver traditions, approximately 40 prominent Shia jurists, including Grand Ayatollah Mohammad Kazem Shariatmadari, signed a collective fatwa excommunicating Borqei. Shariatmadari publicly designated him a Sunni apostate (murtadd), declaring the shedding of his blood permissible.

Borqei was subjected to multiple violent assassination attempts organized by opposing religious factions who sent thugs to disrupt his lectures. During a crowded sermon on the 21st of Ramadan, a group of four to six armed assailants carrying knives stormed the pulpit (minbar) intending to kill him. Due to the dense crowd, the attackers mistakenly stabbed one of Borqei's close associates instead. While mosque attendees successfully captured the assailants and handed them over to the local police, influential clerical networks intervened with state authorities to secure their immediate release without charges.

Due to the persistent threat on his life, the Shah's imperial government deployed police forces to secure the entrance of Borqei's mosque. However, the state intelligence service (SAVAK) simultaneously leveraged this protective detail to monitor his operations, harass his family, and restrict the general public from freely entering to listen to his reformist teachings.

== Views ==
After his conversion to a non-denominational Islam, Borqei held several views contrary to Twelver Shi'ism. He criticized the veneration of Ali ibn Abi Talib and denied the existence of Muhammad al-Mahdi, the son of Hasan al-Askari. Borqei also wrote a Fatwa forbidding Nikah mut'ah or any other form of temporary marriage. Due to his sharp, uncompromising writing style against the clerical establishment, some contemporary Iranian Sunni scholars labeled him the "Ibn Hazm of Iran".

Borqei maintained a balanced assessment of 18th-century reformist Muhammad ibn Abd al-Wahhab; while acknowledging him as an imperfect human capable of error, Borqei openly defended his core mission of reviving pure monotheism (Tawhid) and purging innovations (Bid'ah) as being correctly aligned with the text of the Quran.

== Books ==
Borqei wrote several books in his lifetime, and over forty of them are dedicated to defending orthodox Shiism, after leaving Shiism he wrote new books propagating his new beliefs and refuting his old books.

=== Selected bibliography ===
- Aql wa Deen - An explanation of reason and religion.
- Tabishi az Qur'an - A three-volume tafsir of the Qur'an.
- Khurafat hawl Ziyarat al-Qubur - A book refuting the religious rituals done by Shi'ites.
- Al'aemal al-Halal wal-Haram fi Ziyarat qubur al-Nabi - A book explaining the guidelines for pilgrimage to the grave of Muhammad.
- Kasr al-Sanam - A comprehensive book-length treatise and refutation of the book "Kitab al-Kafi" by medieval Shi'a scholar Al-Kulayni.

In addition to all of these, Borqei translated Ibn Taymiyyah's Minhaj as-Sunnah into Persian, becoming the first scholar to do so.

== See also ==
List of ayatollahs
