= Mahmood Fotoohi Rudmajani =

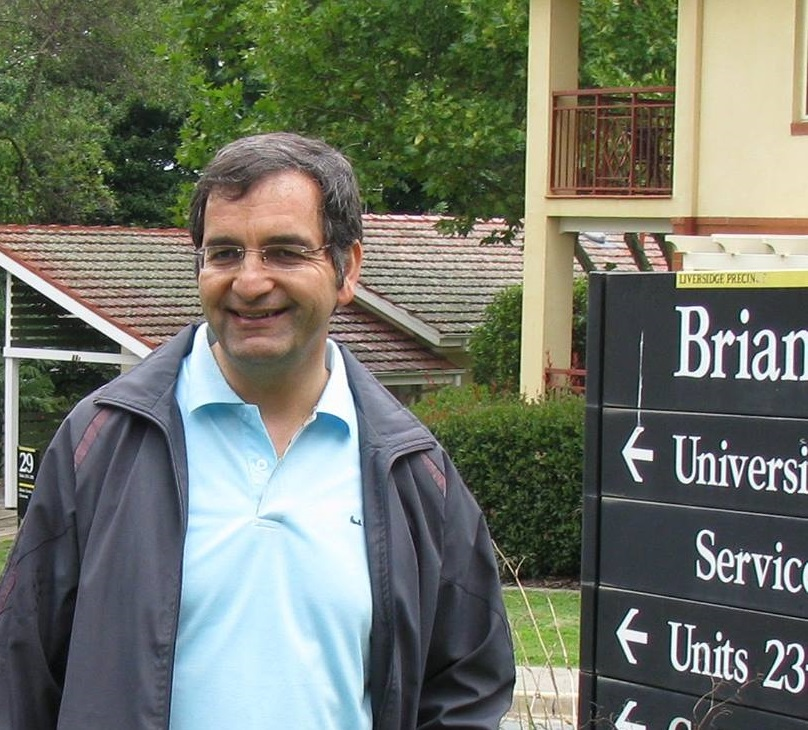
Mahmood Fotoohi Rudmajani

Mahmood Fotoohi Rudmajani (Persian: محمود فتوحی رودمعجنی; born 1964) is Professor of Persian Language and Literature at Ferdowsi University of Mashhad, Iran.

Since 2008 he has served as the editor in chief of Literary Criticism Quarterly, an academic Journal of Tarbiat Modarres university. He was the editor in chief of Journal of Faculty of Letters and Humanities, at Tehran Tarbiyat Moallem University, Iran from 2001 to 2008 and has served as a Member of editorial staff in Monthly philosophy and literature in Tehran (1997–2005).

In 2009 he was selected as the chair of Iranian Literary Criticism Association (ILCA), an academic NGO in Iran, for two years. He has hold the position of Lecturer in the Persian language and Iranian studies at Australian National University (ANU) in 2012 and in Belgrade University in 2001-2003.

His areas of specialization encompass Persian poetry in Safavied period, Indo-Persian poetry, Persian stylistics, traditional rhetoric (Arabic and Persian), Persian literary history, and teaching Persian language.

== Journals Contributions ==
- 2008-2017- Editor in chief. Literary Criticism Quarterly. Tehran, Iran.
- 2005-2008- Editor in chief. Journal of Faculty of Letters and Humanities, Kharazmi University|, Tehran, Iran.
- 2000-2002. Editor in chief. Journal of Faculty of Letters and Humanities, Kharazmi University, Tehran, Iran.

== Books in Persian ==
- 2016. One Hundred Years of Real Love. Tehran: Sokhan. 560 pp. (winner of Gold Pen prize in Iran- 2017)
- 2012. Stylistics, Theories and Methods. Tehran: Sokhan. 590 pp. (winner of 3 book prizes in Iran)
- 2008. Theory of Literary History (with a critical study of writing literary history in Iran). New edition. Tehran: Sokhan. 403 pp.
- 2007. Rhetoric of Image: A comparative study in Persian Poetry and European literary schools. (Balaghat-e Tasvir). Tehran: Sokhan.
- 2006. Criticism in Indo-Persian Style Poetry (Naqd-e Adabi dar Sabk-e Hendi) (revised edition of Naqd-e Khiyāl). Tehran: Sokhan. ISBN 964-372-174-4.
- 2006. A Manual Style (For writing academic article). Tehran: Sokhan. 232 pp.(3rd edited and 18th print in 2016).
- 2005. Serbian History of Literature. Tehran: Naj. 250 pp. ISBN 964-94207-9-7.
- 2005. Serbian Epics (An Introduction and selected songs). Tehran: Naj. 160 pp.
- 2004. Theory of Literary History (a critical study on Persian literary histories). Tehran: Naj. 130 pp. Revised edition Tehran: Sokhan. 403 pp.
- 2003. Threw Apple (A collection of My Poems). Tehran: Naj. 125 pp.
- 1998. Persian Literature: A Persian Literary Textbook for University Students (Farsi Omumi) 320 pp. Tehran: Sokhan. (85th print in 2014). ISBN 964-372-121-3. (95th print in 2016).
