= Lotfollah Safi Golpaygani =

Iranian Grand Ayatollah (1919-2022)

Grand Ayatollah Lotfollah Safi Golpaygani
- آیت الله العظمیٰ شیخ لطف‌الله صافی گلپایگانی
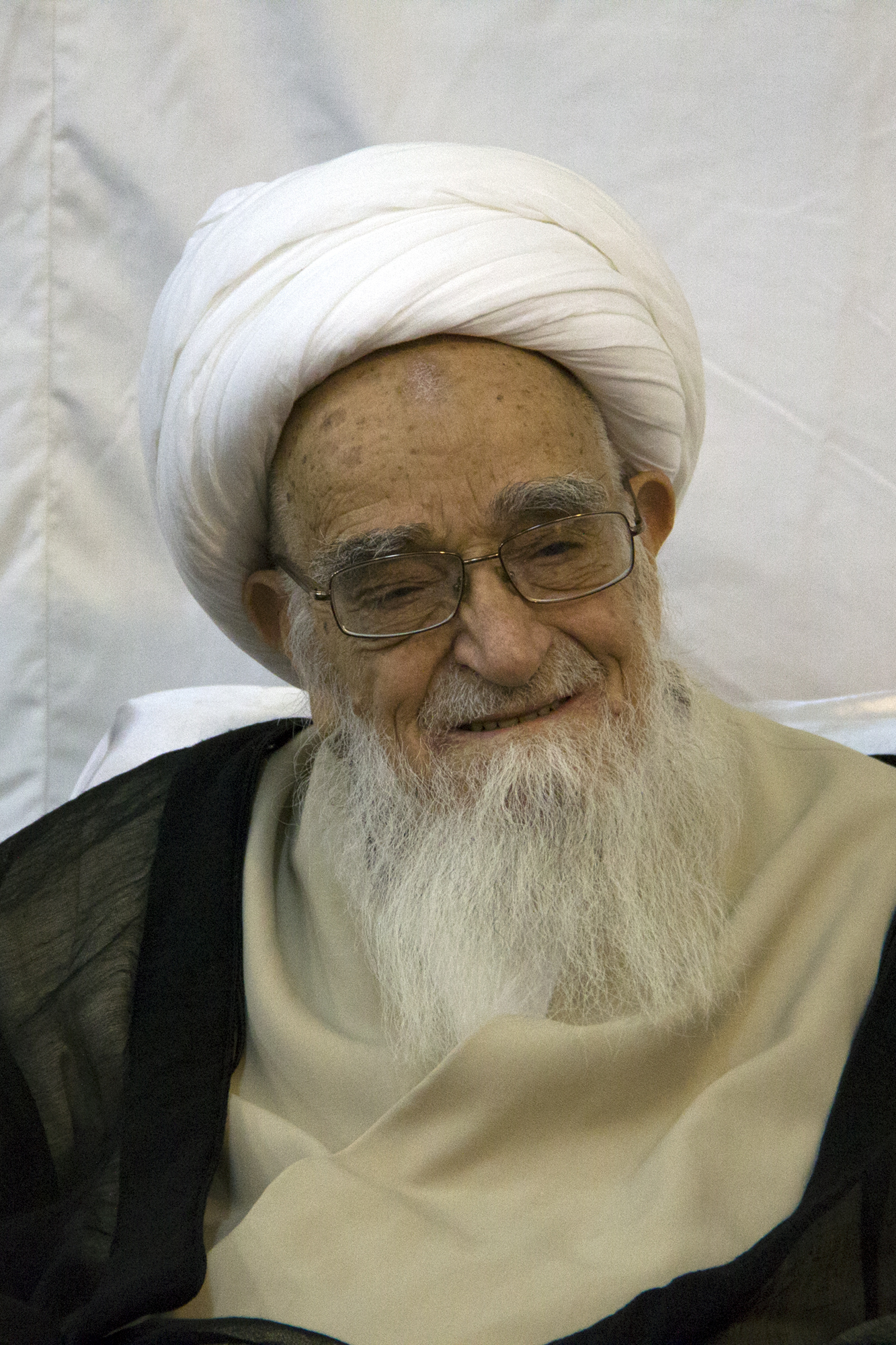
- Lotfollah Golpaygani

Secretary of the Guardian Council
- In office 17 December 1980 – 17 July 1988
- Appointed by: Ruhollah Khomeini
- Preceded by: Mohammad Reza Mahdavi Kani (acting)
- Succeeded by: Mohammad Mohammadi Gilani

Member of the Assembly of Experts for Constitution
- In office 15 August 1979 – 15 November 1979
- Constituency: Markazi Province
- Majority: 256,115 (60.7%)
- Lotfollah Safi Golpaygani
- Title: Grand Ayatollah

Personal life
- Born: 20 February 1919 Golpayegan, Sublime State of Persia
- Died: 1 February 2022 (aged 102) Qom, Iran
- Parent: Mohammad Javad Safi Golpaygani (father)
- Education: Qom Hawza
- Relatives: Ali Safi Golpaygani brother Mohammad-Reza Golpaygani father-in-law Ali Karimi Jahromi son-in-law
- Website: saafi.com

Religious life
- Religion: Islam
- Jurisprudence: Twelver Shia Islam

Muslim leader
- Teacher: Hossein Borujerdi; Seyyed Mohammad Hojjat Kooh Kamari; Sadr al-Din al-Sadr

Lotfollah Safi Golpaygani (Persian: لطف‌الله صافی گلپایگانی; 20 February 1919 – 1 February 2022) was an Iranian Grand Ayatollah. He was at one point the most senior Twelver Shia scholar (Marja') in Iran until his death. He resided in Qom and taught Islam in the Qom Seminary.

== Personal life and education ==
Lotfollah was born in Golpayegan on 20 February 1919 into a religious family. His father, Mohammad Javad Safi Golpaygani, was a high ranking Shia scholar (Marja'). His mother, known as Fatemeh Khanom, was the daughter of a Mujtahid called Akhund Mohammad Ali. His brother, Ali Safi Golpaygani was also a high ranking Shia scholar. He was also the son-in-law of Mohammad-Reza Golpaygani, and father-in-law of Ayatollah Ali Karimi Jahromi.

While a child in Golpayegan, he was first introduced to basic books in Arabic literature Jalil al-Qadr, and Mullah Abu al-Qasim known as "Qutb". He continued his Islamic Studies with his father in Golpeygan, while there his father taught him Islamic Theology (Aqidah), Interpretation of the Quran (Tafsir), Hadith, Islamic Jurisprudence (Fiqh), Principles of Islamic jurisprudence (Usool Fiqh), as well as several other subjects. At the age of 22 in 1941, he left Golpeyegan and settled in Qom to further his Islamic Studies in the Qom Seminary. After spending a few years there, he visited Najaf to attend the Hawza Najaf for approximately 1 year, then returned to Qom to partake in advanced Islamic Studies (Darse Kharej). He would spend the next 15 years there learning and attending lessons under many high ranking Shia scholars, as well as debating Islamic Mysticism.

== Teachers ==
Lotfollah Safi Golpaygani's teachers and tutors included Hossein Borujerdi, Seyyed Mohammad Hojjat Kooh Kamari, Sadr al-Din al-Sadr, and Mohammad-Reza Golpaygani.

== Political activities ==
Before the 1979 Iranian revolution, Lotfollah was a critic of the Shah, Mohammad Reza Pahlavi. SAVAK had banned some of his works in Iran as a response to this. After the revolution, he was elected by the Markazi province to represent them in the Assembly for the Final Review of the Constitution. Ruhollah Khomeini also appointed him to be the secretary in the Guardian Council.

== Works ==
Throughout his life, Lotfollah Safi Golpaygani published over 100 works in both Persian and Arabic. Some of them are:

- al-Taazil: Anvah va Molhaghate (Taazil: its types and its accessories) - Winner of Iran's Book of the Year Awards
- The Way of Reforming or Enjoining in Good, and Forbidding Evil
- Hajj Travelogue
- Hajj
- Prayers in Arafat
- An Attitude Towards Mysticism and Philosophy
- A Ray of Greatness of Imam Hussein (as) - Winner of Provincial Book of the Year in Iran
- Diwan (poetry)
- Weeping for Imam Hussein
- Aware Martyr
- Ramadan in the History of Historical Events
- Theology in Nahj al-Balagha
- The Call for Islam in Europe
- Events Around the Day of Ghadir
- Judgment Between Sheikh Saduq and Sheikh Mofid
- Biography of Mullah Mohammad Javad Safi
- Oqat Salawat
- A Detailed Introduction of 'Muqtadab al-Athar', 'Makial al-Makarem', and 'Muntaqi al-Jaman'
- Comments on the Treatise of al-Jabr and al-Qadr
- A treatise against Philosophy and Mysticism (nigrashi bar falsafa o irfan)

== Views ==
=== Criticism of Islamic Philosophy and Mysticism ===
Safi Golpaygani was a critic of Islamic Philosophy and Mysticism. In one of his essays, he wrote:

"Since the time of Al-Ma’mun (d. 833 CE), when the philosophy of the Greeks got introduced to the Muslims, the holy texts of Islam and the fundamentals of religion became targets for the interpretations of philosophers. . . They interpreted the relationship between the accident and the eternal as the connection of the effect to the cause, not as the relation of creation with the Creator, and these themes are clearly different. . . The causes can come in sequence, like the first cause followed by the second, etc, but the Creator can’t be labelled as first, followed by a second creator, and so on. . . We do not make any hasty generalization in judging specific individuals as belonging to the first category or the second, and we hope that most of the Muslim philosophers belong to the second group. As for their reckoning, it is up to God Almighty."

Commenting on Mysticism, he said:

"Among those who misinterpreted the holy text and moulded its meaning according to their whims and fantasies, the most deviant ones, harmful and unbecoming of them are the Mystics and the Sufis. . . The most dangerous among these to themselves and to others are those who have produced a blend of the so-called gnosis and the Greek philosophy, thus adding fuel to the fire."

He wrote a book, nigrashi bar falsafa o irfan, on this topic too. He was also a critic of Hassan Hassanzadeh Amoli. In a speech with Ahmad Mojtahedi Tehrani, he spoke against a poem of Rumi, and Hassan Amoli and said they are "against us". He is among several high ranking Shia scholars who reject Islamic Mysticism and claims it to be nothing but dreamy and artificial, and that the pursuit of such things is a waste of life.

=== Reducing poverty in Iran ===
Safi Golpaygani often spoke out against poverty in Iran. He claimed that a just Islamic System should eradicate poverty. In an interview with Tasnim News Agency, he highlighted that the Imam Khomeini Relief Committee should focus on reducing poverty and social problems in Iran.

Any society in which the people and their officials show an interest in caring for the weak and the poor has a real life. The sign of a living Islamic society is that its people care about the deprived and the poor. Unfortunately, there are shortcomings in the society that make people sad. It is really unfortunate to see that in the Islamic society, we see unemployed youth and another group who are addicts, and in this situation, the duty of those who are able to help is very heavy, and these individuals and organisations must enter the field of aid with serious effort and know that if they fail, they are really responsible to God

— Lotfollah Safi Golpaygani, Interview with Tasnim, Interview with Tasnim (in Persian)

=== Calling for Iran to establish good relations with all countries around the World ===
On 21 October 2021, Mohammad Bagher Ghalibaf met with Safi Golpaygani. Lotfollah emphasised the need for Iran to establish good relations with all nations around the world. He was very concerned about the economic situation, and the problems the people are facing.

We should have relations with all countries of the world with dignity and authority. It is not right to be angry with many countries and it is to the detriment of our dear people. You must realise the rights of the nation with rationality and a constructive interaction … I am very worried about the economic situation and the problems of the people, the noble people of our country do not deserve this situation. The prices have become exhausting for the people and it has become very difficult for our dear people to bear it

— Lotfollah Safi Golpaygani, Meeting with Ghalibaf, Ayatollah Safi and Ghalibaf, BBC Farsi (in Persian)

After this, he received criticism from several outlets, most notably from Hossein Shariatmadari with Kayhan newspaper.

=== Condemnation of the Taliban ===
After the Taliban took control of Afghanistan in August 2021, there was a fear among the Shia of Afghanistan as to what would happen to them due to their Persecution in Afghanistan under the Taliban. Safi Golpaygani issued a message for the World to help the people of Afghanistan.

I beseech the independent and freedom-seeking nations of the world to ensure that this inhuman group is not able to continue their horrendous atrocities, and I request all those people whose human conscience is awake, especially the brothers and sisters in faith, to help the oppressed and plundered people of Afghanistan as much as possible, and hastily stand in support of the homeless and shelter-less people, thus fulfilling their human and religious responsibility.

— Lotfollah Safi Golpaygani, Message to the for the independent and freedom-seeking nation of the world, https://www.saafi.com/en/news/8502

=== The Shahin Najafi affair ===
When Shahin Najafi released a song called "Naghi", he angered many Shia Muslims in Iran, and around the world. In the song, Shahin was accused of insulting the 10th Imam of The Twelve Imams, Ali al-Hadi. He also depicted the Imam Reza Shrine (shrine of 8th Imam, Ali al-Ridha) in an indecent manner alongside a rainbow flag. Two weeks prior to the release of his song, a Fatwa was issued by Safi Golpaygani claiming those who insult the Imams should be issued a death penalty. It was after the release of his song that this Fatwa was then issued for Shahin Najafi.

== Death ==
In the early hours of Tuesday, 1 February 2022, Lotfollah Safi Golpaygani died in a hospital in Qom due to a cardiac arrest at the age of 102. His death was mourned by many Shias around the World, figures such as Ali Khamenei, Ali al-Sistani and Hossein Wahid Khorasani sent a message of condolence on his death. His funeral took place on 2 February in Qom, many attended his funeral. His son-in-law Ali Karimi Jahromi led his funeral prayers.

His body was transferred to Karbala and was buried in the Imam Husayn Shrine on 3 February as per his will.

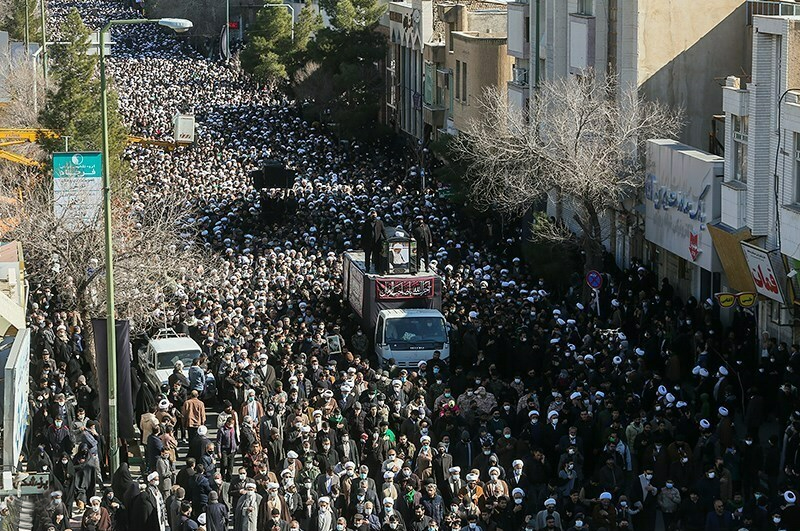
Funeral service of Grand Ayatollah Lotfollah Safi Golpaygani in Qom, 2 February 2022.

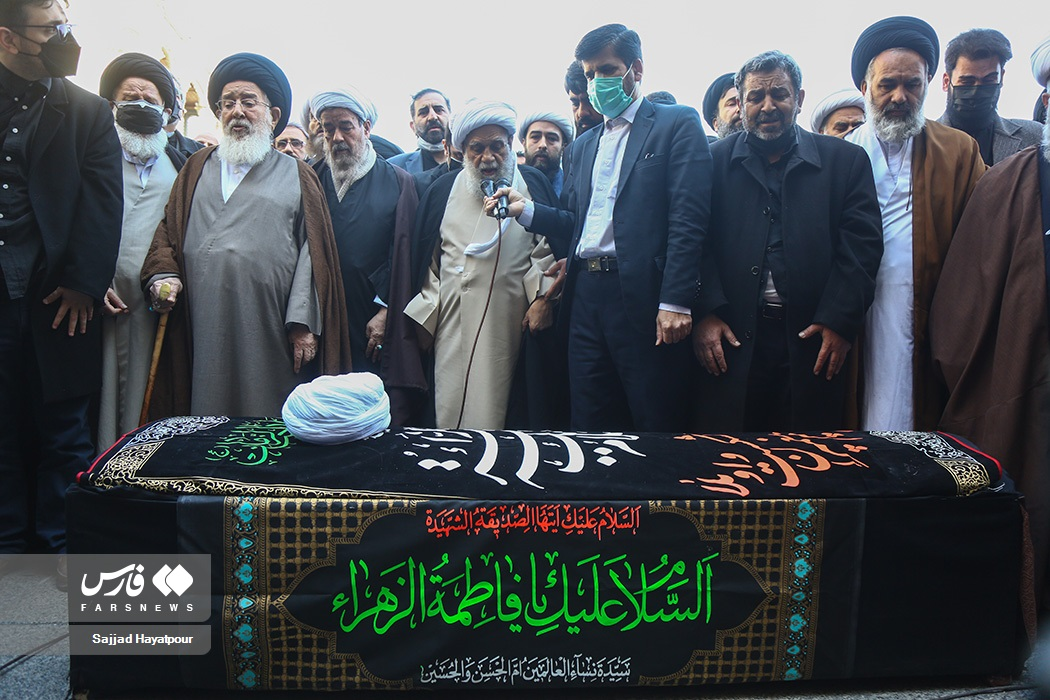
Ayatollah Ali Karimi Jahromi leading funeral prayers for Grand Ayatollah Lotfollah Safi Golpaygani in Qom, 2 February 2022.

== See also ==
- List of maraji
- List of deceased maraji
