= Tarikh-i Bayhaqi =

11th century Persian history book

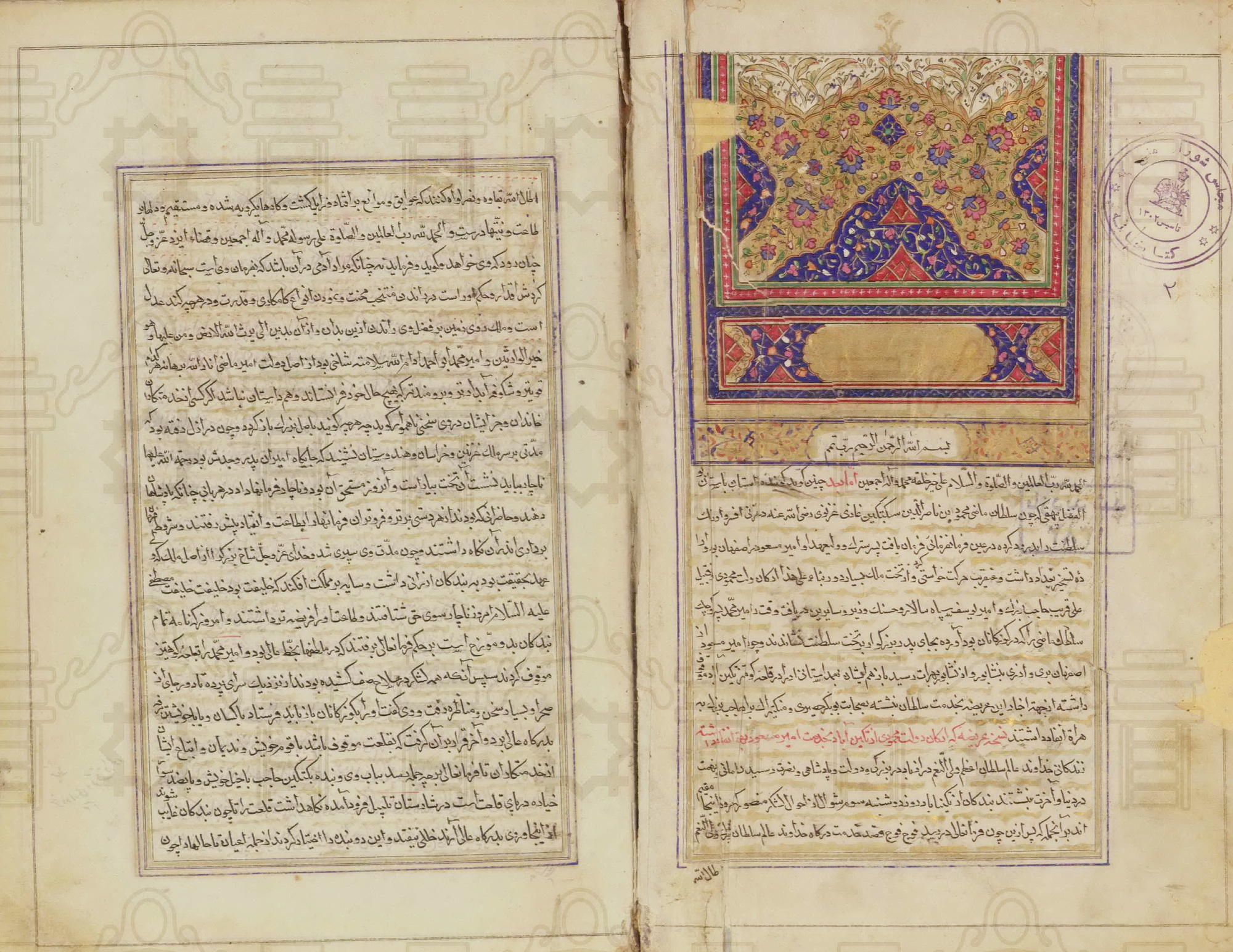
- A manuscript of Bayhaqi's History, preserved in the Library, Museum and Document Center of Iran Parliament.
- Author: Abul-Fazl Bayhaqi
- Original title: تاریخ بیهقی
- Language: Persian of Ghazni
- Subject: History
- Publication place: Ghaznavid Empire

Tārīkh-i Bayhaqī (Persian: تاریخ بیهقی; lit. 'Bayhaqi's History') (Note: Transliteration based on Classical Persian, as the book was written in. For modern Iranian Persian the name could be transliterated as some variation of "Târikh-e Beyhaqi" or "Târikh-e Beyhaghi". See Persian phonology for more information.) is a history book written by Abul-Fazl Bayhaqi, in Persian, in the 11th century CE. Much of this voluminous work is lost, but it remains one of the most important sources concerning the history of the Ghaznavid Empire.

The work is more than a history book. Its detailed descriptions and unique style of narration of the historical events has made it similar to a "historical novel" and one of the masterpieces of Persian literature. The work was written at the Ghaznavid chancellery in order to frame the Turkic-origin Ghaznavid rulers in line with Iranian kings.

== Names ==
The work has been published under multiple names:

- Tārīkh-i Bayhaqī (تاریخ بیهقی, Bayhaqi's History)
- Tārīkh-i Nāsirī (تاریخ ناصری, Nasiri's History)
- Tārīkh-i Masʿūdī (تاریخ مسعودی, Mas'udi's History)
- Tārīkh-i Āl-i Nāsir (تاریخ آل ناصر, History of the House of Nasir)
- Tārīkh-i Āl-i Sabuktagīn (تاریخ آل سبکتگین, History of the House of Sabuktigin)
- Jāmiʿ al-Tawārīkh (جامع التواریخ, Compendium of Chronicles)
- Jāmiʿ fī Tārīkh-i Sabuktagīn (جامع فی تاریخ سبکتگین, Compendium on Chronicles of Sabuktigin)
- Mujalladāt (مجلدات, The Volumes or The Books)

== Content ==
Tarikh-i Bayhaqi is believed to have consisted of thirty books, of which only six books remain. The main topic of the remaining books is the reign of Mas'ud I, sultan of the Ghaznavid Empire. In addition to reporting political events, the work reports on geographical places and on the history of Persian literature by mentioning notable writers and poets of the time.

K. Allin Luther compared the epistemology of Bayhaqi's History to later Seljuq historians and advises a rhetorical approach to the work. Marilyn Waldman also recommends a rhetorical approach through speech act theory, yet does not give a comprehensive breakdown of the text. Julie Scott Meisami also points to the analytical nature of the work and places Bayhaqi among the historians of the Islamic renaissance.

Owing to his distinctive approach in the narration of historical accounts, the precision of Bayhaqi's work was unprecedented.

Tarikh-e Bayhaqi is well known for its rich use of language. Several features of the work has transformed it into literary prose, including the use of neologisms, novel word combinations and syntaxes, archaic words, imagery, Quranic verses and Hadith, Persian and Arabic poems, and various types of parallelism and repetition (including vowels, words, and syntaxes).

The work has also been compared to a historical novel.

== See also ==
- Ali Akbar Fayyaz

== Sources ==
- Amirsoleimani, Soheila (1999). "Truths and Lies: Irony and Intrigue in the Tārīkh-i Bayhaqī". Iranian Studies. 32 (2, The Uses of Guile: Literary and Historical Moments, Spring). Taylor & Francis: 243–259. doi:10.1080/00210869908701955.
- Fomerand, Jacques (2009). "Abu'l Fazl Bayhaqi". The A to Z of the United Nations. Scarecrow Press, Inc.
- Mansouri, Ayyoub (2012). "Beyhaghi's Historical Novel" (PDF). Journal of American Science. 8 (4). Marsland Press: 792–794.
- Marlow, Louise (2008). "Abu 'L-fadl Al-Bayhaqi". In Meri, Josef W. (ed.). Medieval Islamic Civilization: An Encyclopedia. Taylor & Francis Group.
- Mousavi, Naiemeh; Hajiaqababaei, Mohammad Reza (2020). "Linguistic Foregrounding in Tarikh-e Beyhaqi based on Geoffrey Leech's Theory" (PDF). IQBQ. 11 (1): 163–192.
