= Hassan Mortazavi Shahroudi =

Iranian Ayatollah

Ayatollah; Seyyed; Hassan Mortazavi Shahroudi
- آیت الله سید حسن مرتضوی شاهرودی
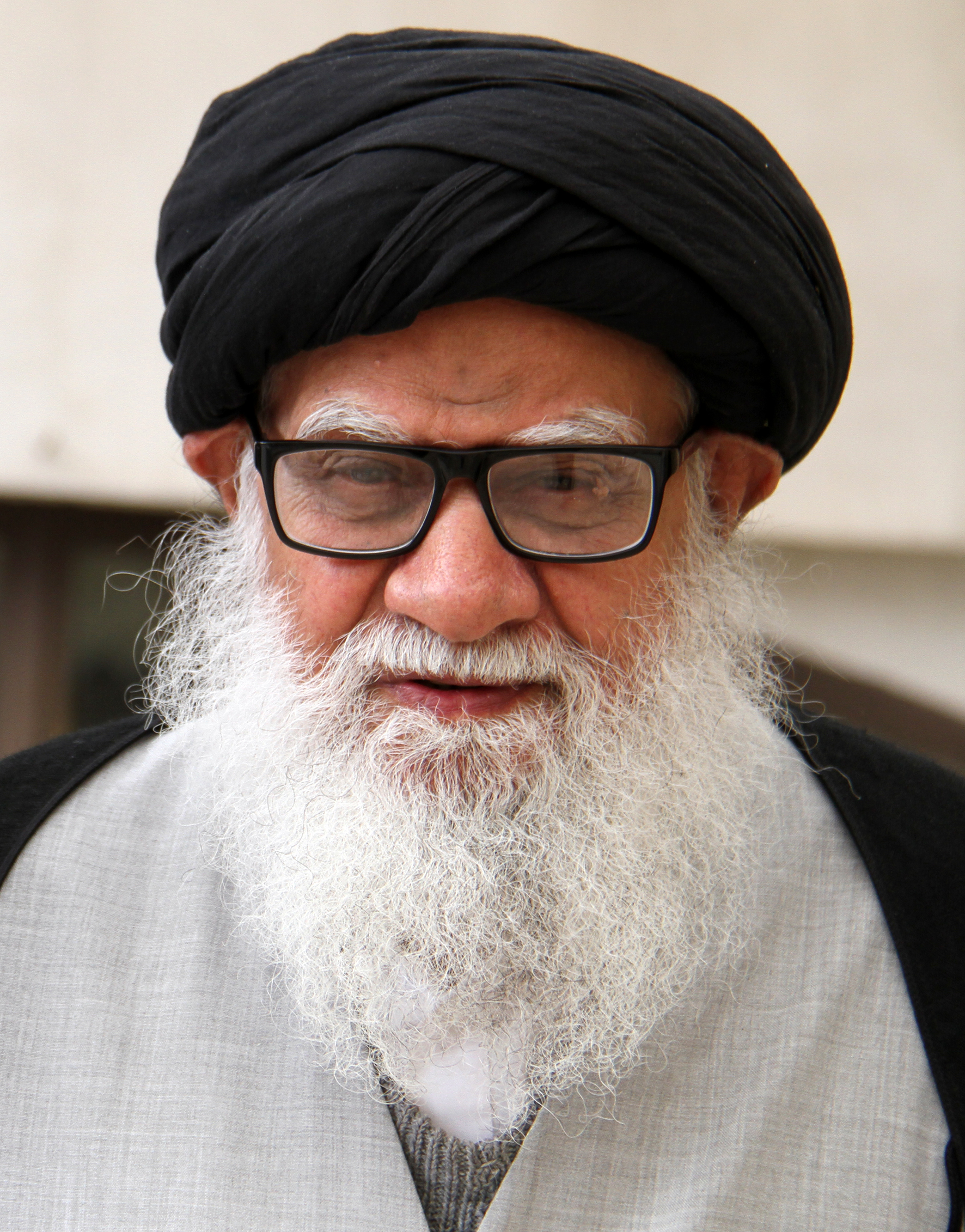

Representative of the Supreme Leader of Iran in the Supreme Council of the Khorasan Seminary
- Incumbent
- Assumed office 8 March 2016
- Appointed by: Ali Khamenei
- Title: Ayatollah

Personal life
- Born: Hassan Mortazavi; 22 February 1933 (age 93) Shahrud, Imperial State of Persia
- Education: Hawza Najaf; Mashhad Seminary

Religious life
- Religion: Islam
- Sect: Shia
- Jurisprudence: Twelver, Jaffari

Muslim leader
- Based in: Mashhad
- Students: Mohsen Araki, Mohammed Ridha al-Sistani, Arif Hussain Hussaini, Seyed Javad Shahrestani, Muhammad Baqir Movahed Najafi

Seyed Hassan Mortazavi Shahroudi Persian: سید حسن مرتضوی شاهرودی, is an Iranian Ayatollah. He currently teaches Fiqh in Darse Khariji levels in Mashhad Islamic Seminary, and was one of the students of Ruhollah Khomeini in Najaf.

== Early life and education ==
Shahroudi was born in Shahrud, a city in Semnan province. When he was young, he began the basics of his Islamic studies in Shahrud, until he migrated to Mashhad at the age of 15. In Mashhad, he truly began the principles of Islamic studies. There, he was taught by the likes of Hashem Qazvini, Mohammad Hadi al-Milani, Mirza Ahmad Modares Yazdi, Mohammad Kazem Damghani, and Hossein Shahroudi.

At the age of 25, Shahroudi left to Najaf to study in the Najaf Seminary. While in Najaf, Shahroudi was able to complete his advanced Islamic Studies, and attained Ijtihad. He was taught by several prominent scholars, such as, Abu al-Qasim al-Khoei, Muhsin al-Hakim, Seyed Mohammad Hossein Shahroudi, Hossein Heli, and Ruhollah Khomeini.

Shahroudi did travel to Qom for family matters while he was attending Najaf seminary, however had issues going back to Najaf. As a result of this, he stayed in Qom to attend classes in Qom Seminary by Hossein Borujerdi and Seyed Mohammad Mohaqeq Damad.

== Teaching career ==
Shahroudi's teaching career started when he was in Najaf. He taught high-level advanced Islamic courses in Najaf's Dar al-Hikma School, such as works on Usul Al-Fiqh by Murtadha al-Ansari, Fariad al-Usul (Rasa'l), and Makasib. In addition to this, he also taught works by Muhammad Kazim Khurasani, Kifayat al-Usul. He also taught other advanced courses related to Darse Kharij. As a result of these advanced classes, he was able to teach many students in Najaf, such as Mohammed Ridha al-Sistani, Arif Hussain Hussaini, Seyed Ahmad Madadi, Seyed Javad Shahrestani, Mohsen Araki, Muhammad Baqir Movahed Najafi, Seyed Ali Ridha Haydari Najafi, Seyed Reza Borqei Modares, and others.

After receiving pressure from Saddam Hussein's Ba'athist Iraq during the Iran–Iraq War, Shahroudi fled to Iran. He left to Mashhad, and continued both his studies, and his teaching career there. Since 1980, he has grown the Mashhad Seminary with his presence and his courses, teaching hundreds of students every year. He went on to teach a number of vast topics derived from Fiqh such as Hajj, Qisas, Ijitihad & Taqlid, Khums, Riba, Fasting, Iʿtikāf, Diya, Qada, and Hudud. As a result of his success in Mashhad, the Supreme Leader of Iran, Ali Khamenei chose Shahroudi as his representative in the Supreme Council in the Khorasan Seminary.

== Works ==
Some of his works:

- Kitab al-Bai: Lessons of Earnings (5 Volumes)

== See also ==
- List of Ayatollahs
- Quranic studies
- Shia clergy
- Ali Karimi Jahromi
- Islamic studies
