= Iranian Journal of Numerical Analysis and Optimization =

- Discipline: Numerical Analysis, Control and Optimization
- Language: English
- Edited by: Ali Reza Soheili

Publication details
- History: 2008–present
- Publisher: Ferdowsi University of Mashhad (Iran)
- Frequency: Quarterly
- Open access: Yes
- License: CC BY-NC 4.0

Standard abbreviations
- ISO 4: Iran. J. Numer. Anal. Optim.

Indexing
- ISSN: 2423-6977 (print); 2423-6969 (web)
- OCLC no.: 1099203399

Links
- Journal homepage; Online access; Online archive

The Iranian Journal of Numerical Analysis and Optimization is a quarterly peer-reviewed open-access scientific journal covering numerical analysis and optimization. It was established in 2008 and is published by the Ferdowsi University of Mashhad. The editor-in-chief is Ali. R. Soheili. The journal is indexed and abstracted in Scopus and zbMATH Open.
