= Mohammad Ali Araki =

Iranian Grand Ayatollah (1894-1994)

Mohammad Ali Araki محمدعلی اراکی
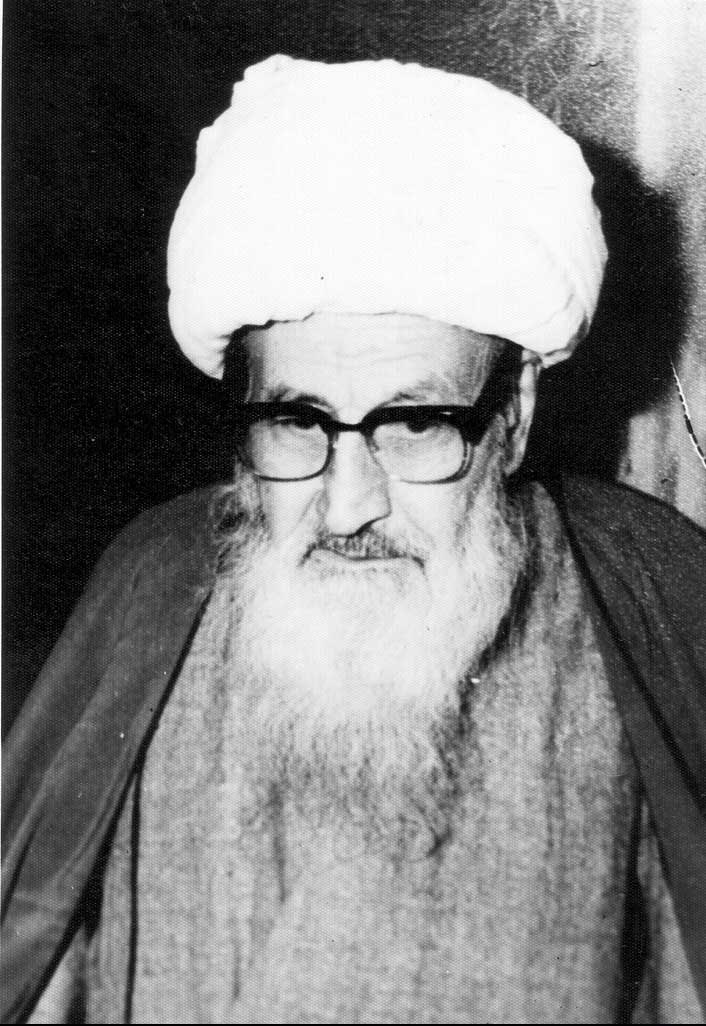
- Grand Ayatollah Mohammad Ali Araki
- Title: Grand Ayatollah

Personal life
- Born: Arak, Iran
- Died: November 24, 1994 Qom, Iran
- Resting place: Fatima Masumeh Shrine
- Other name: Persian: محمدعلی اراکی

Religious life
- Religion: Shia Islam (Usuli Twelver)

Grand Ayatollah Mohammad Ali Araki (Persian: محمدعلی اراکی, c.1890s - 24 November 1994) was an Iranian Twelver Shia Marja'. Once considered 'the world's most eminent Shiite Muslim cleric', Araki held the title of supreme guide and Marjaa Taqlid.

Araki taught many Iranian revolutionaries, including Ruhollah Khomeini. When he died, IRNA declared that "he was considered the greatest living Marja'".

== Biography ==
Mohammad Ali Araki was born in 1894 in Arak, Iran. He started his education from Arak Hawza. Grand Ayatollah Haeri allowed him to wear the turban and robe because qualified individuals were limited. Araki studied for many years in Yazd Hawza. After that he moved to Qom and continued his studying under supervision of Abdul-Karim Ha'eri Yazdi.

After Khomeini's death, Ayatollah Mohammad-Reza Golpaygani and later Araki were selected by Society of Seminary Teachers of Qom as Marjari.

Araki's first decree as Grand Ayatollah was to declare that his followers could continue to follow Khomenei's teachings.

== Political activities ==
Before the revolution, Araki supported Khomeini's political activities against the Pahlavi regime. Even after Khomeini issued a statement in 1962 opposing the Capitulations bill and the non-Islamic laws passed by the National Consultative Assembly, Araki also issued a statement in support of him and called for those laws to be repealed. After Khomeini was exiled to Najaf, Araki went to Najaf and, despite pressure from the regime, he went to visit Khomeini. After the Islamic Revolution, Araki also supported the government and the Islamic Republic. After Imam Khomeini died and Khamenei was chosen as Supreme Leader, Araki was happy with the choice and supported Khamenei.

== Works ==
Mohammad Ali Araki wrote several works on Islamic jurisprudence and principles. His works include: Notes on the lectures of Sheikh Mohammad Sultan al-Ulama, Notes on the jurisprudence lectures of Sheikh Abdolkarim Haeri Yazdi, Notes on the lectures on the principles of jurisprudence by Sheikh Abdolkarim Haeri Yazdi, A commentary on Durar al-Usul by Sheikh Abdolkarim Haeri Yazdi, Notes on the jurisprudence lectures of Mohammad Taqi Khansari, A commentary on Urwat al-Wuthqa, A detailed commentary on Urwat al-Wuthqa, Tawdih al-Masa'il, Manasik al-Hajj, Risalat al-Istifta'at, An introduction to al-Quran wa al-Aql by Sayyid Nur al-Din Araki, and al-Nikah wa al-Talaq.

== Death ==
Ayatollah Araki died on 24 November 1994. His precise age at death is disputed. He was buried in Qom's Fatima Masumeh Shrine.

Following Araki's death, a list of new candidates (seven of the ulamā) for the marjaʿiyya was issued by the Society of Teachers of the Qom Seminaries included Ali Khamenei. This caused widespread controversy between supporters of the regime and those who considered Khamenei an unsuitable candidate.

== See also ==
- List of maraji
