= Hossein Borujerdi =

Iranian cleric (1875-1961)

Grand Ayatollah Seyyed Hossein Borujerdi
- حسین بروجردی
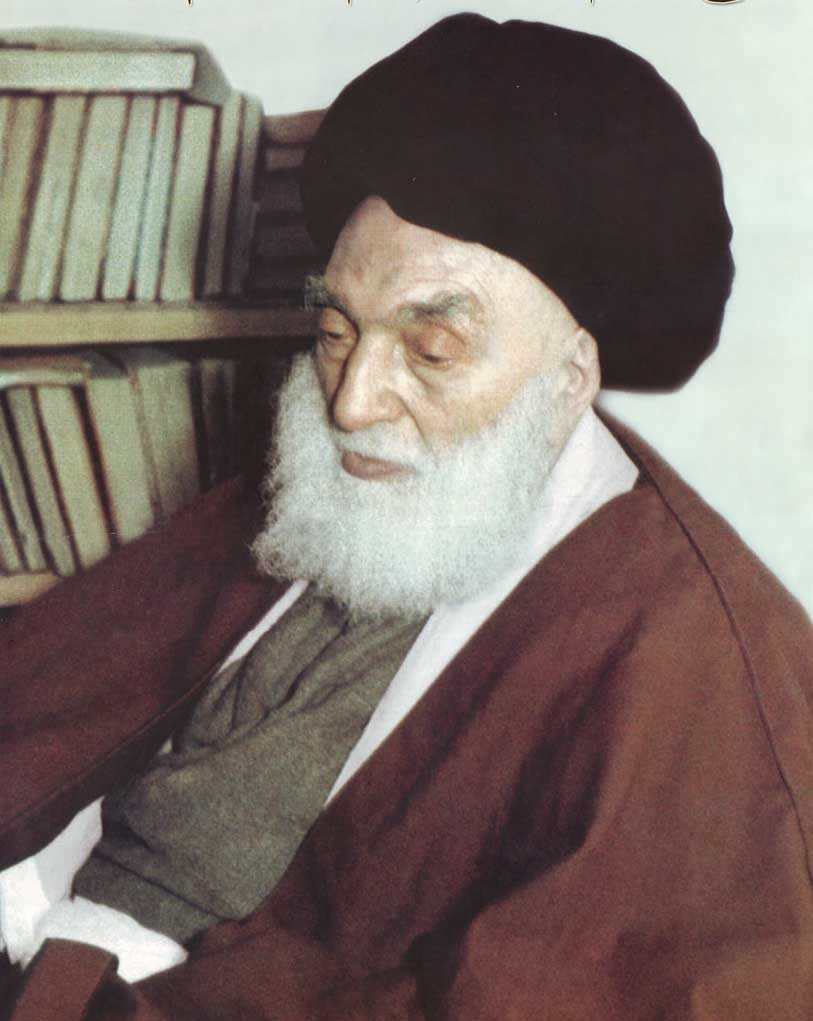
- Borujerdi, late 1950s

Personal life
- Born: 23 March 1875 Borujerd, Qajar Iran
- Died: 30 March 1961 (aged 86) Qom, Imperial State of Iran
- Resting place: Fatima Masumeh Shrine
- Era: Modern history
- Main interest: uṣūl al-fiqh

Religious life
- Religion: Islam
- Denomination: Twelver Shi'a
- Jurisprudence: Ja'fari
- Creed: Usuli

Muslim leader
- Based in: Najaf, Iraq
- Post: Grand Ayatollah
- Period in office: 1937–1946
- Predecessor: Abu l-Hasan al-Isfahani
- Successor: Muhsin al-Hakim
- Influenced: Morteza Motahhari Mohammad Alavi Gorgani Ruhollah Khomeini

Ayatollah Seyyed Hossein Ali Tabatabaei Borujerdi (Luri/Persian: آیت الله العظمی سید حسین طباطبایی بروجردی; 23 March 1875 – 30 March 1961) was an Iranian Twelver Shia cleric and marja' of Iran from 1947 to his death in 1961. He was a major proponent for the elimination of the Baháʼís in Iran.

== Life ==
Borujerdi was born on 23 March 1875 in the city of Borujerd in Lorestan Province in Iran. His family traced its lineage 30 generations to Hassan ibn Ali (the grandson of Muhammad). His father Sayyid Ali Tabataba'i was a religious scholar in Borujerd and his mother, Sayyidah Agha Begum, was the daughter of Sayyid Mohammad Ali Tabataba'i.

== Tenure as Ayatollah and Marja ==
Borujerdi revived the hawza of Qom in 1945 (1364 AH), which had waned after the death of its founder Abdul-Karim Ha'eri Yazdi in 1937. When Sayyid Abul Hasan Isfahani died the following year, the majority of Shi'a accepted Ayatullah Borujerdi as Marja'. Scholar Roy Mottahedeh reported that Borujerdi was the sole marja "in the Shia world" from 1945-6 until his death in 1961.

=== Outreach in the Islamic world ===
Borujerdi was praised by Morteza Motahhari for attempting to bridge the gap between Sunnis and Shiites. Borujerdi sent representatives to Lebanon, Kuwait, Sudan and Pakistan. He also helped establish the Islamic Center of Hamburg. Borujerdi also sent missionaries to spread Islam in Europe and the United States.

He established cordial relations with Mahmud Shaltut, the grand Shaykh of Al-Azhar University. Together, the two scholars established the "Organization for Rapprochement Among the Islamic Sects" ( Dar al-Taqrib bayn al-Madhahib al-lslamiyyah) in Cairo. Shaltut issued a famous fatwa legitimizing Ja'fari school of jurisprudence on par with the four major Sunni legal schools, and promoted its teaching at Al-Azhar.

=== Permission for narrating Hadith ===
Borujerdi was authorized as a Mujtahid by his teachers, which included Akhund Khurasani, Shaykh al-Shari'ah Isfahani and Sayyid Abu al-Qasim Dihkurdi. He was also given the permission of narrating Hadith by Akhund Khurasani, Shaykh al-Shari'ah Isfahani, Shaykh Muhammad Taqi Isfahani known as Aqa Najafi Isfahani, Sayyid Abu al-Qasim Dihkurdi, Agha Buzurg Tihrani and 'Alam al-Huda Malayiri.

=== Teaching method ===
Borujerdi used a simple language in his lessons and avoided unnecessary extra discussions. Like early Shi'a 'ulama such as Shaykh al-Mufid and Sayyid Murtada, Shaykh al-Tusi, Shaykh Tabarsi and Allamah Bahr al-'Ulum, he had a comprehensive knowledge of different Islamic studies. He also studied jurisprudential verdicts of Shi'a and Sunni faqihs of the past. He had a unique method in ‘Ilm al-rijal by studying the chain of narrators of hadiths in the Four Books independently from narrations. Through this method, he made great contributions to later research.

=== Persecution of religious minorities ===
After Ayatollah Borujerdi's settlement in Qom in December 1944, according to one of his students named Ahmad Ali Ahmad Shahrudi, he "made efforts to eliminate" the Baha'is and sent his students to various cities "to campaign against Baha'ism." When Ahmad and a few others went to see Borujerdi to "be informed of his directives," he told them, "Go and kill them (the Baha'is)! If you can kill them, do it! Kill them and be assured!" Following this order, several Baha'is were killed across Iran, and the murderers, often acting in groups, remained immune from punishment due to the support and influence of the clergy, even if they were arrested. For example, one can refer to the murder of Habibullah Houshmand and his infant in Servestan, as well as a young engineer named Abbas Shahidzadeh in Shahi, all in 1947, and the murder of Dr. Soleiman Berjis in 1949 in Kashan. The actions of Ayatollah Borujerdi, Ayatollah Seyyed Mohammad Behbahani, and Ayatollah Abol-Ghasem Kashani led to the release of eight murderers of Berjis. The murderers had killed this Baha'i doctor with eighty-one knife wounds and had confessed to this act at the police station.

The most severe wave of persecution against Baha'is during the Pahlavi era began in Ramadan 1955 when, at Borujerdi's request, the government allowed Mohammad Taghi Falsafi to preach against the Baha'is on national radio and incite the public against them. This sparked a wave of Baha'i-phobia across the country, leading to the murder and plundering of Baha'is in many areas. One of the reasons for this wave of Baha'i hostility was that the Shah felt indebted to the religious clerics who had helped him regain power through the coup against Mosaddegh. This action also served to divert public attention from the unpopular policies of the Shah. As a result of incitements from clerics in Tehran, the government issued orders to confiscate the assets and properties of Baha'is in various cities. The situation worsened with the government's decision to seize the national headquarters of the Baha'i community and to destroy the dome of the Hazirat al-Quds. Consequently, encouraged by the government and religious scholars to act against the Baha'is, officials directly intervened in the demolition of the dome of the Baha'i center (Hazirat al-Quds) in Tehran. In Tehran, in front of foreign reporters, clergymen wielding pickaxes participated in the destruction of the dome alongside military commanders.

The Chief of Staff of the Army, Nader Batmanghelidj, and the military governor of Tehran, Teymur Bakhtiar, who later became the head of SAVAK, joined the representatives of the clerics to personally participate in the destruction of this building. At that time, the government announced that it had issued orders to suppress all activities of the "Baha'i sect." Immediately, a wave of anti-Baha'i violence swept across the country. During this period, many Baha'is were killed, their properties confiscated and destroyed, some were subjected to sexual assault, and Baha'is working in the government were dismissed. Numerous other acts of persecution against Baha'is were carried out both individually and collectively. The Báb's House in Shiraz, the most important sacred site for Baha'is, was looted and destroyed. Baha'i cemeteries were confiscated and handed over to thugs for demolition. The bodies of Baha'is were dragged through the streets and burned in public.

According to Shahrokh Akhavi, on May 9 of the same year, the text of a congratulatory telegram from Seyyed Abdollah Behbahani to Seyyed Hossein Tabatabai Borujerdi and the Shah, celebrating the destruction of the dome of the Baha'i center in Tehran and its seizure by the military, was published in the press. Behbahani referred to the Imperial Army of Iran as the Army of Islam and assured the Shah that his actions would incite fervent support from believers. He requested that the anniversary of this day be recognized as a religious holiday.

Ayatollah Borujerdi, who initiated this persecution and killings, published an open letter to Falsafi commending his services to Islam and the monarchy. In this letter, Boroujerdi described the Baha'i faith as a conspiracy threatening both the government and the national religion, calling for a complete cleansing of Baha'is from all public service positions.

Pressure from the global Baha'i community, foreign press, the United Nations, and other countries made it difficult for Mohammad Reza Shah to resist. As news of the crimes, assaults, and plundering against members of the Baha'i community in Iran spread, a wave of international opposition emerged through media against the Iranian government for allowing such behavior. This disgrace compelled the Shah, who was concerned about such criticisms from abroad, to cease his cooperation with the clerics and to intervene to stop what was happening.

=== Political leanings ===
Unlike many clergy and temporal rulers, Borujerdi and Mohammad Reza Shah, are said to have had cordial and mutually beneficial relations, starting with a visit by the Shah to Borujerdi's hospital room in 1944. Borujerdi is said to have generally remained aloof from politics and given the Shah his "tacit support," while the Shah did not follow his father's harsh anti-clericalism (for example he exempted clergy from military service), and until Borujerdi's death occasionally visited the cleric.

Borujerdi's belief in quietism, or silence of state matters, extended to keeping silent in public on such issues as Israel's treatment of the Palestinians, the overthrow of Mohammad Mosaddegh and the end of his campaign to nationalise and control the British-owned oil industry in Iran, and the Baghdad Pact alliance with the US and UK. It is thought that as a reward for this support the Shah ensured more religious instruction in state schools, tightened control of cinemas and other offensive secular entertainment during Moharram.

Ayatollah Borujerdi passively opposed the Pahlavi regime's agrarian reforms, which he called "agrarian destruction." In his view, the confiscations of large concentrations of landholdings of aristocrats and clergy by the Pahlavi shahs disrupted the fabric of rural life and eroded religious institutions.

Ruhollah Khomeini, who would lead the Iranian people's revolution in 1979, was Borujerdi's pupil. Borujerdi forbade Khomeini from taking part in political activities, a ban which ended with Borujerdi's death.

=== Pepsi fatwa ===
In 1955, Borujerdi issued a fatwa making Pepsi Cola illegal in Iran. According to Ruhollah Khomeini, this was because the Pepsi franchise in Iran was held by Habib Sabet, a disciple of Baháʼí.

== Death ==
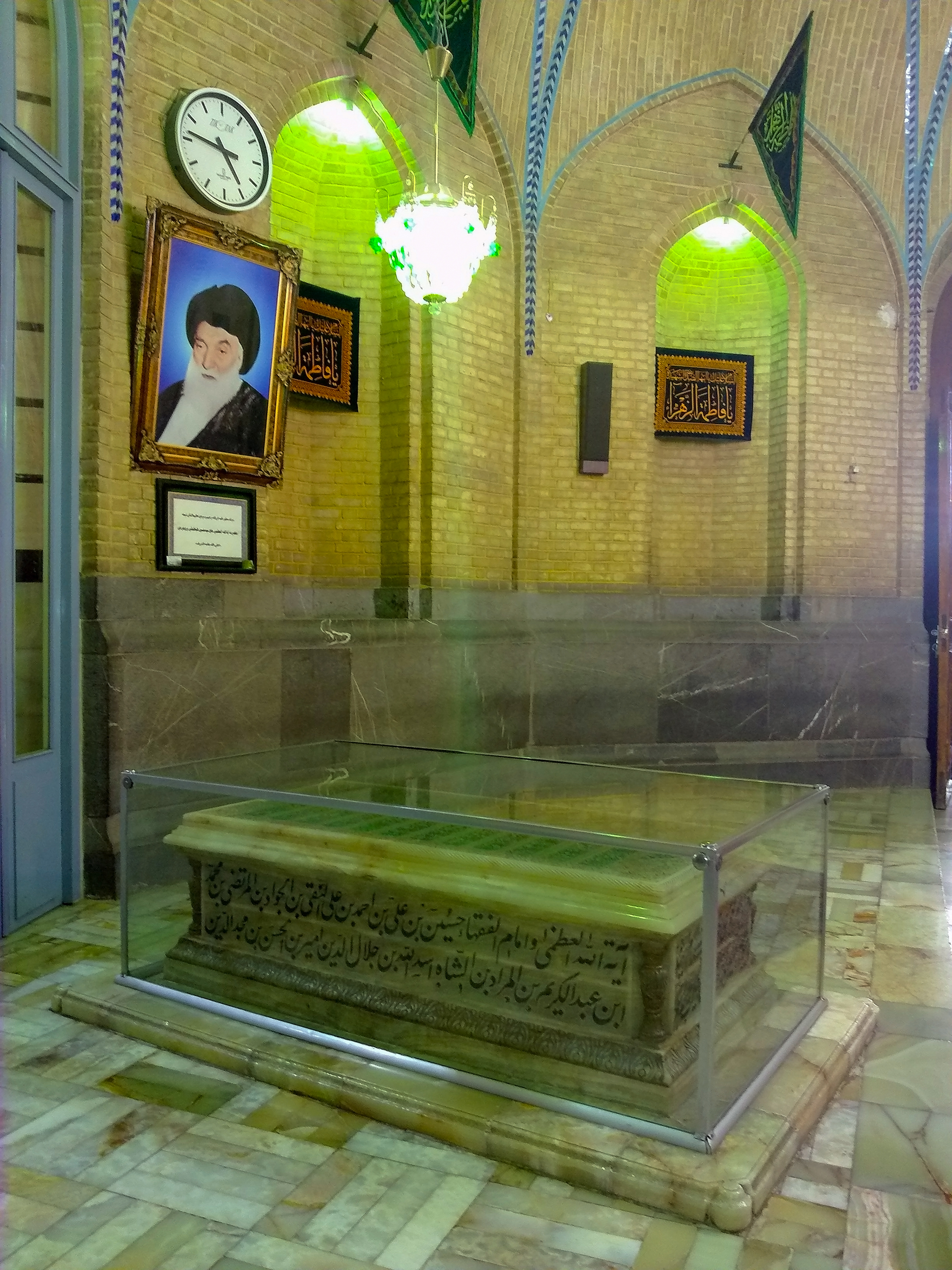
Grave of Grand Ayatollah Hossein Borujerdi in Fatima Masumeh Shrine

Borujerdi died in Qom on 30 March 1961. Mohammad Reza Shah proclaimed three days of mourning and attended a memorial service in his honour.

== Personal life and education ==
=== Family ===
Borujerdi had two sons and three daughters from his first wife, all but one of whom died in childhood. The one who survived, died due to a difficult labour two years after marriage.

He had two sons and two daughters from his second wife (the daughter of Hajj Muhammad Ja'far Roughani Isfahani).

His third wife was his cousin, the daughter of Sayyid ‘Abd al-Wahid Tabataba'i.

One of his sons, Sayyid Muhammad Hasan Tabataba'i Burujirdi, who was born in 1925 in Burujird, was in charge of writing the official verdicts of his father. He died in 1977 in Qom.

=== Education and academic specialties ===
After entering elementary school at the age of seven, Sayyid Husayn's father realized his talent for learning and sent him to Nurbakhsh seminary in Borujerd. At the age of 11 he began his education at the theological schools of his city, under his father Sayed Ali. Then in 1310 (1892–93) he attended the theological school of Isfahan to continue his education. In the ten years that he studied in Isfahan, he completed his sutuh studies and was also granted the level of Ijtihad from his teachers, and began teaching Usul. Around the age of 30, Burujerdi moved from Isfahan to the theological seminary of Najaf, Iraq to continue his education.

In his youth, Borujerdi studied under a number of Shia masters of fiqh such as Sayyid Muhammad Baqir Durchih'i, Mohammad-Kazem Khorasani and Aqa Zia Iraqi, and specialized in fiqh. He studied the fiqahat of all the Islamic schools of thought, not just his own, along with the science of rijal. Though he is known for citing Masumeen to support many of his deductions, Borujerdi is known for elucidating many aspects himself and is an influential fiqh jurist in his own right. He has had a strong influence on Islamic scholars like Morteza Motahhari and Hussein-Ali Montazeri.

== Notable students ==
- Ruhollah Khomeini
- Mohammad-Reza Golpaygani
- Hossein Vahid Khorasani
- Hussein-Ali Montazeri
- Sayed Ali Khamenei
- Allama Syed Arif Hussain al-Hussaini
- Sayyid Ali al-Sistani
- Lotfollah Safi Golpaygani
- Ali Safi Golpaygani
- Mohammad Fazel Lankarani
- Seyed Ali Mirlohi Falavarjani
- Mousa Shubairi Zanjani
- Karamatollah Malek-Hosseini
- Muhammad Taha al-Huwayzi

== Works authored ==
=== In Arabic ===
1. Jami' ahadith al-shi'a (31 vol)
2. Sirat al-nijat
3. Tartib asanid man la yahduruh al-faqih
4. Tartib Rijal asanid man la yahduruh al-faqih
5. Tartib asanid amali al-saduq
6. Tartib asanid al-Khisal
7. Tartib asanid 'ilal al-sharayi'
8. Tartib asanid tahdhib al-ahkam
9. Tartib rijal asanid al-tahdhib
10. Tartib asanid thawab al-a'mal wa 'iqab al-a'mal
11. Tartib asanid 'idah kutub
12. Tartib rijal al-Tusi
13. Tartib asanid Rijal al-Kashshi
14. Tartib asanid rijal al-najjashi
15. Tartib rijal al-fihristayan
16. Buyut al-shi'a
17. Hashiyah 'ala rijal al-najjashi
18. Hashiyah 'ala 'umdat al-talib fi ansab al abi talib
19. Hashiyah 'ala manhaj al-maqal
20. Hashiyah 'ala wasa'il al-shi'a
21. Al-mahdi (a) fi kutub ahl al-sunnah
22. Al-athar al-manzumah
23. Hashiyah 'ala majma' al-masa'l
24. Majma' al-furu'
25. Hashiyah 'ala tabsirah al-muta'allimin
26. Anis al-muqalladin

=== In Persian ===
1. Tudih al-manasik
2. Tudih al-masa'l
3. Manasik haj

== See also ==
- Marja'
- List of Islamic studies scholars
