= Ali Safi Golpaygani =

Iranian Grand Ayatollah (1913-2010)

Grand Ayatollah Sheikh Ali Safi Golpaygani
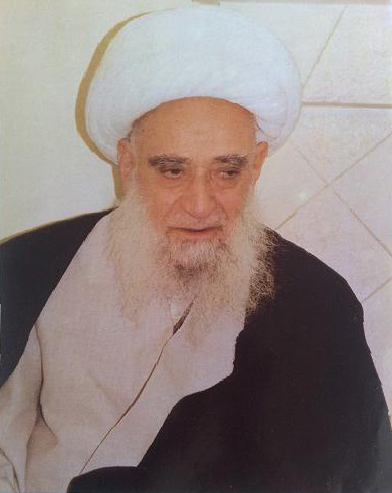
- Born: 1913; Golpayegan, Sublime State of Persia
- Died: 3 January 2010 (aged 96); Golpaygan, Iran
- Website: www.alisafi.ir

Grand Ayatollah Sheikh Ali Safi Golpaygani (Persian: علی صافی گلپایگانی, 1913 – 3 January 2010) was an Iranian Twelver Shi'a Marja. He was born in Golpayegan, Iran. He has studied in seminaries of Najaf, Iraq under Grand Ayatollah Borujerdi. He taught at the Seminary of Qom.

His teachers included his father, Muhammad-Javad Safi, Abd al-Karim Ha'iri Yazdi, Hossein Borujerdi, Muhammad Hujjat Kuh-Kamari, Muhammad-Taqi Khansari, and Muhammad al-Hamadani. Among his students were Mahdi Ha'iri Tehrani, Mustafa Khomeini, and Mohammad Beheshti.

He died from natural causes on 3 January 2010 in Golpayegan, aged 96.

== Works ==
The works of Ali Safi Golpaygani include:

- Dhakhirat al-Uqba — a commentary on Urwat al-Wuthqa (30 volumes, 11 of which have been published, covering the section on ritual purity);
- Tibyan al-Salat — notes from Ayatollah Borujerdi's lectures on prayer (8 volumes);
- Al-Mahajja fi Taqrirat al-Hujja — notes from Ayatollah Hojjat's lectures on usul al-fiqh (2 volumes);
- Al-Dalala ila Man Lahu al-Wilaya — on the doctrine of wilayat al-faqih;
- Raz-e Del — a collection of his poetry;
- Dar Entezar-e Visal — a collection of his poems about the Mahdi;
- Tawdih al-Masa'il — a practical manual of Islamic rulings;
- Montakhab al-Ahkam — a selection of Islamic rulings;
- Manasik al-Hajj — a guide to the rites of Hajj;
- Tarikh-e Tahavvol-e Fiqh-e Shi'a — The History of the Development of Shi'a Jurisprudence, translated and prefaced by Mohammad Hasan Tavakkol;
- Al-Majdi — notes from Ayatollah Borujerdi's lectures on wills.

== See also ==
- Lists of maraji
