= Amir Khajepour =

Amir Khajepour Is a Professor of Mechanical Engineering at University of Waterloo. He holds Tier 1 Canada Research Chair in Mechatronics Vehicle Systems. He is Co-author of Laser Cladding book published by CRC Press.

== Education ==
- PhD: University of Waterloo, 1996
- MASc: Sharif University of Technology, 1992
- BASc: Ferdowsi University of Mashad, 1989

== Selected/Recent Publications ==
- A. Fathi, E. Toyserkani, A. Khajepour, and M. Durali, "Prediction of melt pool depth and dilution in laser powder deposition" Journal of Physics D: Applied Physics, Vol. 39, pp. 2613–2623, 2006.
- Behzadipour, S., and Khajepour, A., "Time-Optimal Trajectory Planning in Cable-based Manipulators", IEEE Transactions on Robotics, Volume 22, Issue 3, June 2006 Page(s):559 - 563.
- Behzadipour, S., Khajepour, A., "Causality in Vector Bond Graphs and its Application to Modeling of Multi-Body Dynamic Systems", Journal of Simulation Modelling Practice and Theory, Volume 14, Issue 3, April 2006, Pages 279-295.
- Behzadipour, S., Khajepour, A., "Stiffness of Cable-based Parallel Manipulators with Application to Stability Analysis", ASME Journal of Mechanical Design, 128, 303 (2006).
- Motiee, M., Mansour, R. R., and Khajepour, A., "Novel MEMS Filters For On-Chip Transceiver Architecture, Modeling and Experiments", Journal of Micromechanics and Microengineering, 16 (2006), pp. 407–418.
