= 1989 Iranian supreme leader election =

- 4 June 1989

86 members of the Assembly of Experts 49 votes needed to win
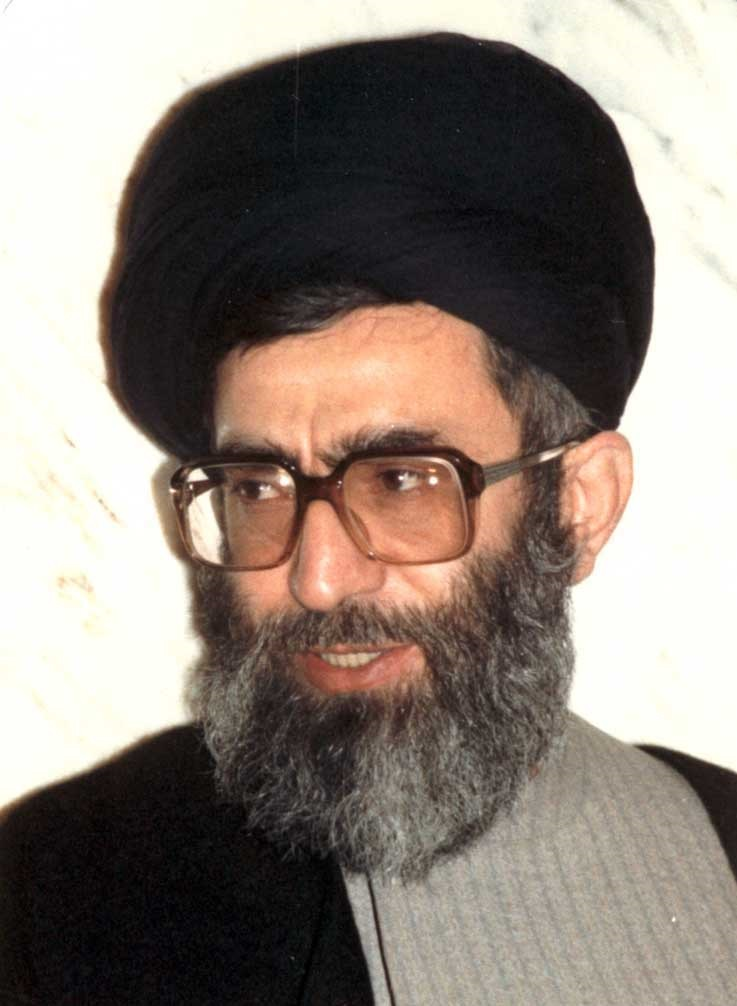

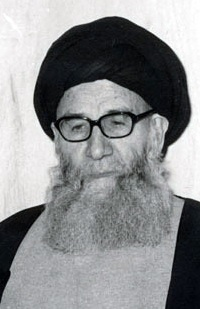
Nominee	Ali Khamenei	Mohammad-Reza Golpaygani
Party	Combatant Clergy Association	Independent
Alliance	Traditional Right (Note: Origin of the Principlists)	Islamic Left (Note: Origin of the Reformists)
First round	Did not stand	14 (16.3%)
Second round	60 (69.8%)	Withdrew
Supreme Leader before election
Ruhollah Khomeini
Independent
Elected Supreme Leader
Ali Khamenei (acting)
Combatant Clergy Association
- 6 August 1989

64 members of the Assembly of Experts 33 votes needed to win
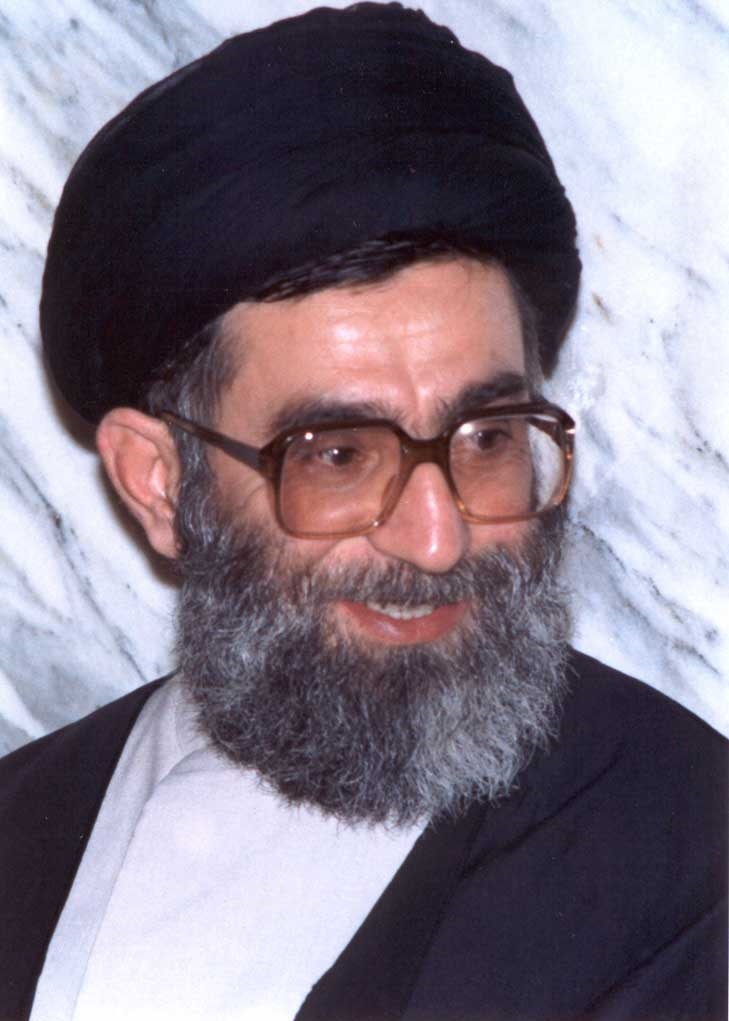
Nominee	Ali Khamenei
Party	Combatant Clergy Association
Alliance	Traditional Right
Electoral vote	60 (93.8%)
Supreme Leader before election
Ali Khamenei (acting)
Combatant Clergy Association
Elected Supreme Leader
Ali Khamenei
Independent

An election for the second supreme leader of Iran was held on 4 June and 6 August 1989 following the death of the first supreme leader Ruhollah Khomeini.

In the second ballot in June, Ali Khamenei was elected as acting supreme leader by the Assembly of Experts with 60 votes out of 86 due to him not being a Marja', which was required in the Constitution. Eventually, a constitutional referendum held in July passed and Khamenei was officially elected as the permanent supreme leader the following month with 60 votes out of the 64 members of the Assembly of Experts present during the third ballot.

== Background ==
Because of a conflict of ideology between Ruhollah Khomeini and Hussein-Ali Montazeri, his accepted heir, Khomeini requested a revision of Article 109, which held that successors to Khomeini must be a "source of imitation" or having held the title of Marja'. The change to the constitution would not officially come until 6 August 1989, wherein a vote would reduce the qualification to having the authority to issue a fatwa. The debate within the Assembly of Experts on the constitutional change included whether the clerical qualification of Marjaʿiyyat present in Article 109 contributed to the quality of leadership Khomeini was seen as maintaining. The Assembly of Experts, made up of many people who were integral to the revolution of 1979 and in some cases knew Khomeini, concluded Khomeini's leadership was attributed in part to his religious qualifications, but mostly his political motivation and skill.

== Election ==
The decision to hold the session was made on 3 June 1989, when Ahmad Khomeini phoned Akbar Hashemi Rafsanjani at around 3:00 pm to inform him that his father was in critical condition. When it became evident that choosing a successor would be necessary, Rafsanjani and Mohsen Rezaee called Assembly of Experts members in the provinces to Tehran for an emergency meeting. The announcement of Ruhollah Khomeini's death was delayed until after the meeting.

Rafsanjani led the meeting in the next morning, and brought the sealed testament that was held in a safe. President Ali Khamenei read the will, after Ahmad Khomeini refused to do so because of grief. Reading the 35 pages of the testament took roughly over two hours.

=== Supreme Leader versus Leadership Council ===
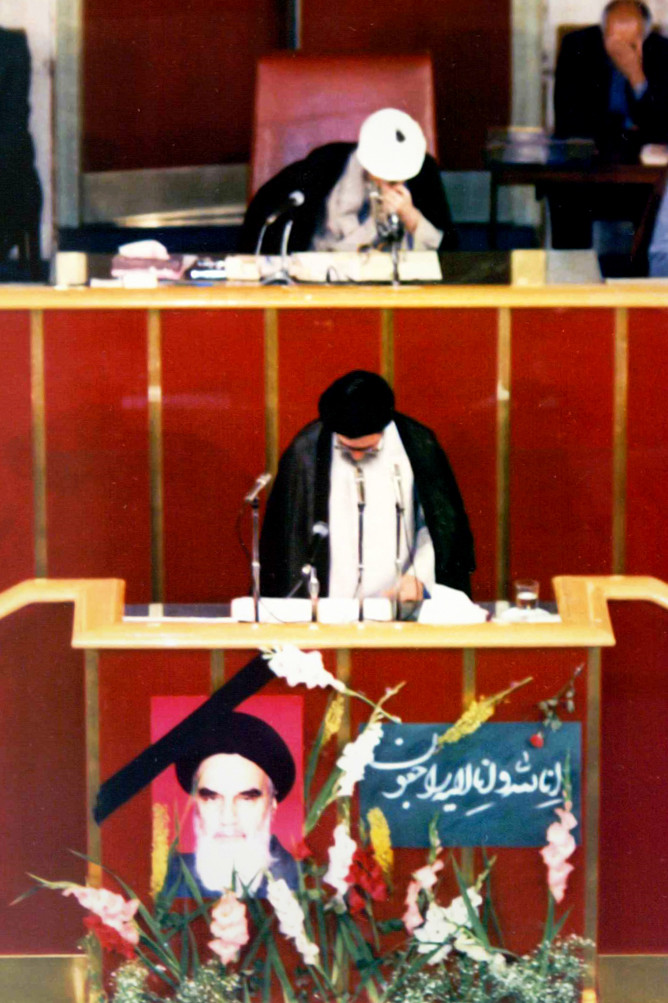
Khamenei reading Khomeini's testament in the meeting

The first matter brought up for discussion was whether the Assembly of Experts should mandate an Interim Leadership Council or a single person. Several names were proposed as members of the council by proponents of a leadership council, including:

Officials		First group	Second group	Third group
Ali Khamenei	President	check		check
Akbar Hashemi Rafsanjani	Parliament Speaker		check	
Abdul-Karim Mousavi Ardebili	Chief Justice	check		check
Ali Meshkini	Assembly Chairman	check	check	check
Mohammad Fazel Lankarani	Marja'			check
Abdollah Javadi Amoli	Marja'			check

45 members voted in favor of a single person, and 23 against, who voted for a council leadership. Ali Khamenei and Akbar Hashemi Rafsanjani were both among advocates of a council.

Choice	Votes	%
To elect a Supreme Leader	45	66.18
To establish a leadership council	23	33.82
Total	68	100.00

=== Nomination of Mohammad-Reza Golpaygani ===
After a single officeholder was voted over a council, Mohammad-Reza Golpaygani was proposed as the successor. He was considered a distinguished Marja', and after Hussein-Ali Montazeri was dismissed as the heir, he quickly emerged as the "leading candidate" in public discussions. However, Golpaygani was "utterly unknown to the general public" and lacked political experience. He finally received only 14 votes.

=== Nomination of Ali Khamenei ===
After Golpaygani's vote did not meet the threshold, for the second attempt Ali Khamenei was considered and was chosen as the supreme leader. The national press wrote that he was chosen with 60 votes in favor, and 14 votes against. Because Khamenei was not a Marja' which was a requirement in the Constitution, he was only elected as acting supreme leader. Ali Meshkini declared that he was chosen because of his close relations with Khomeini, and having played important roles both during the revolution and war, and due to his familiarity with social, economical and political issues; while Akbar Hashemi Rafsanjani claimed that Khomeini had wished on his deathbed that Khamenei succeed him.

In July the constitutional referendum was passed and Khamenei was officially elected as the permanent supreme leader the following month with 60 votes out of the 64 members of the Assembly of Experts present.

== Analysis ==
External videos
- Iran's Supreme Leader election – Radio Free Europe/Radio Liberty

The details of the discussions regarding his nomination were kept a secret for decades. In 2008, excerpts of never-before-seen footage of the session was aired by the state-run Islamic Republic of Iran Broadcasting, showing that Akbar Hashemi Rafsanjani played a key role in persuading members of the Assembly of Experts to vote for Khamenei. Rafsanjani declared that "The Imam said: Why [do you think] we don't have [anyone suitable]? Mr. Khamenei [is suitable]." According to the testimony of Rafsanjani in the session, Ayatollah Khomeini had in a meeting in March 1989 pointed that Khamenei would be a suitable successor for him, responding to remarks that no other candidate exists for succession after the dismissal of Montazeri. As a result, Rafsanjani was widely credited as a "kingmaker".

Regardless of the fact that I do not truly deserve to occupy such a position, installing me as the caretaker has technical problems. [My] leadership would be formal [only on paper], not a real one. Well, based on the Constitution, I am not qualified for the job and, from a religious point of view, many of you [all clergy members of the Assembly of Experts] will not accept my words as those of a leader. What sort of leadership will this be?

— Ali Khamenei, 2018 leaked video

Khamenei himself opposed the motion, stating "I support shuray-e rahbari [leadership council], according to the Constitution, and am opposed to rahbari-ye fardi [individual leadership]. How can I be a candidate?". He was responded to by Rafsanjani, "rahbari-ye fardi has become the law (qanun shode). There is no alternative." The video shows Khamenei leaving the podium, after saying "on this issue ... well, I am against it anyway", then Rafsanjani announces "Those in favor, stand up!" and an overwhelming majority stand while shouting 'God is great'.

In February 2019, the third part of the documentary Narrative of the Leadership revealed that Khamenei had been temporarily elected to act as Supreme Leader until constitutional amendments were approved by the constitutional referendum. The Assembly of Experts had later reconfirmed its decision in August 1989, appointing him to be the permanent supreme leader.

== Results ==
Candidate	First round		Second round		Third round	
Candidate	Votes	%	Votes	%	Votes	%
Ali Khamenei			60	69.77	60	93.75
Mohammad-Reza Golpaygani	14	16.28				
Against			14	16.28		
Unclear	72	83.72	12	13.95	4	6.25
Total	86	100.00	86	100.00	64	100.00
