= Seyed Ali Mirlohi Falavarjani =

Seyed Ali Mirlohi Falavarjani is an Iranian professor of Arabic literature, now retired from the University of Isfahan. He was born in 1942 in the city of Falavarjan, the province of Isfahan, Iran. He is the founder of the Islamic Azad University of Falavarjan, Isfahan, and was its president from 1985 to 1992. This branch of the university now has in excess of 4,000 students across more than 10 fields of study. It has a high number of female students.

== Biography ==
Seyed Ali Mirlohi is son of -Hojjat al-Eslam- Solomon Mirlohi, a popular and respected religious figure in Falavarjan who died in 1987. He was educated at Minoo elementary school until 1952, and then to seminary school of Fiqh level with masters such as Ayatollah Sheikh Hassan Emami. Later in his life, Mirlohi went to Qom seminary, and participated in Ayatollah Seyyed Hossein Borujerdi's classes.

Mirlohi earned his diploma in 1964, and entered Tehran University in the Faculty of Theology.

-Tehran University Faculty of Theology degree in Arabic language and literature at Tehran University, 1967.

-Tehran University MA in Arabic language and literature at Tehran University in 1970.

-Tehran University PhD in Arabic language and literature Faculty of Theology Faculty in 1975.

== Career ==
From 1974 to 1978, Mirlohi was assistant professor at the Ferdowsi University of Mashhad. Between 1979 and his retirement in 2010, he was successively assistant, associate, and full professor of the university of Isfahan.

In 2005, Mirlohi was named as Iran's best professor by Mostafa Moeen, the Iran minister of higher education, for his research excellence, teaching experience, and contribution to Arabic Literature. He was chairman of the Isfahan University committee for academic excellence for professors for more than 15 years to evaluate their academic achievements.

== Research fields ==
Mirlohi's academic interests have included Rhetoric, especially the Qu'ran, and Arabic grammar and syntax, especially the Qu'ran and prose interpretation and dissemination of literature along politics.

Mirlohi is currently editor in chief for Research in Arabic Language and Literature, a semi-annual journal published by University of Isfahan.

== Publications ==
Many of Mirlohi's publications are in the Arabic language, or translated from Arabic to Persian. His works include:

- Raghib Isfahani: His Life and Works, publisher: Recreational and Cultural Organization of the Municipality of Isfahan, 2008
- Mukhtar al-Adab Al-Arabi, publisher: Tehran, 2004 the university textbooks
- Revised and research Alzaryah to Makarem Alshryh, publisher: University of Isfahan 1997
- Translation of the book of Aljman in Qu'ran, publisher: Islamic Research Foundation, 1995, p Mashhad
- Translation and innovative research of Ibn Abi al-Masri, publisher: Institute Press Astan Qods Razavi"" Mashahd 1992
