= Ibn Taymiyyah (disambiguation) =

Ibn Taymiyyah (1263 – 1328) was an Islamic scholar and theologian of the Mamluk period.

Ibn Taymiyyah may also refer to:

- Majd ad-Din ibn Taymiyyah (1194 – 1255), grandfather of Ibn Taymiyyah
- Shihab al-Din Abd al-Halim ibn Taymiyyah (1230 – 1284), father of Ibn Taymiyyah
