= Ferdowsi University of Mashhad =

Iranian university

Coordinates: 36°18′27″N 59°31′43″E

- دانشگاه فردوسی مشهد
- Motto: خرد باید و دانش و راستی
- Motto in English: Wisdom, Knowledge, and Integrity
- Type: Public University
- Established: 1949; 77 years ago
- Affiliations: Ministry of Science, Research and Technology
- Endowment: US$ 57.43 million
- President: Prof. Abdolreza Javan Jafari Bojnordi
- Students: 30,000
- Location: Mashhad, Razavi Khorasan, Iran
- Campus: 741.316 acres; Urban
- Website: en.um.ac.ir/

Ferdowsi University of Mashhad (FUM, Persian: دانشگاه فردوسی مشهد, romanized: Daneshgah-e Ferdosi-ye Mashhad) is a public university in Mashhad, the capital city of the Iranian province of Razavi Khorasan. FUM is named after Abul-Qâsem Ferdowsi, who is considered to be the national epic poet of Greater Iran. Having been established in 1949, FUM is the third-oldest modern university in Iran.

FUM is among the most prestigious universities in Iran, and was ranked as the 3rd best Iranian university in the 2018 ISC rankings published by the Iranian government. FUM offers 180 bachelors, master's, and Ph.D. programs to 30,000 students. It has 810 faculty members and 2500 staff members. FUM has the highest number of enrollments of foreign students in Iran, especially from neighboring countries such as Afghanistan, Syria, and Iraq.

== Mission ==
The mission of the Ferdowsi University of Mashhad is to educate the citizens and citizen-leaders of society based on divine principles of Islam and scientifically qualified centers of excellence. FUM has some mosques, the most prominent of which is the mosque of Imam Reza which was built in 1993.

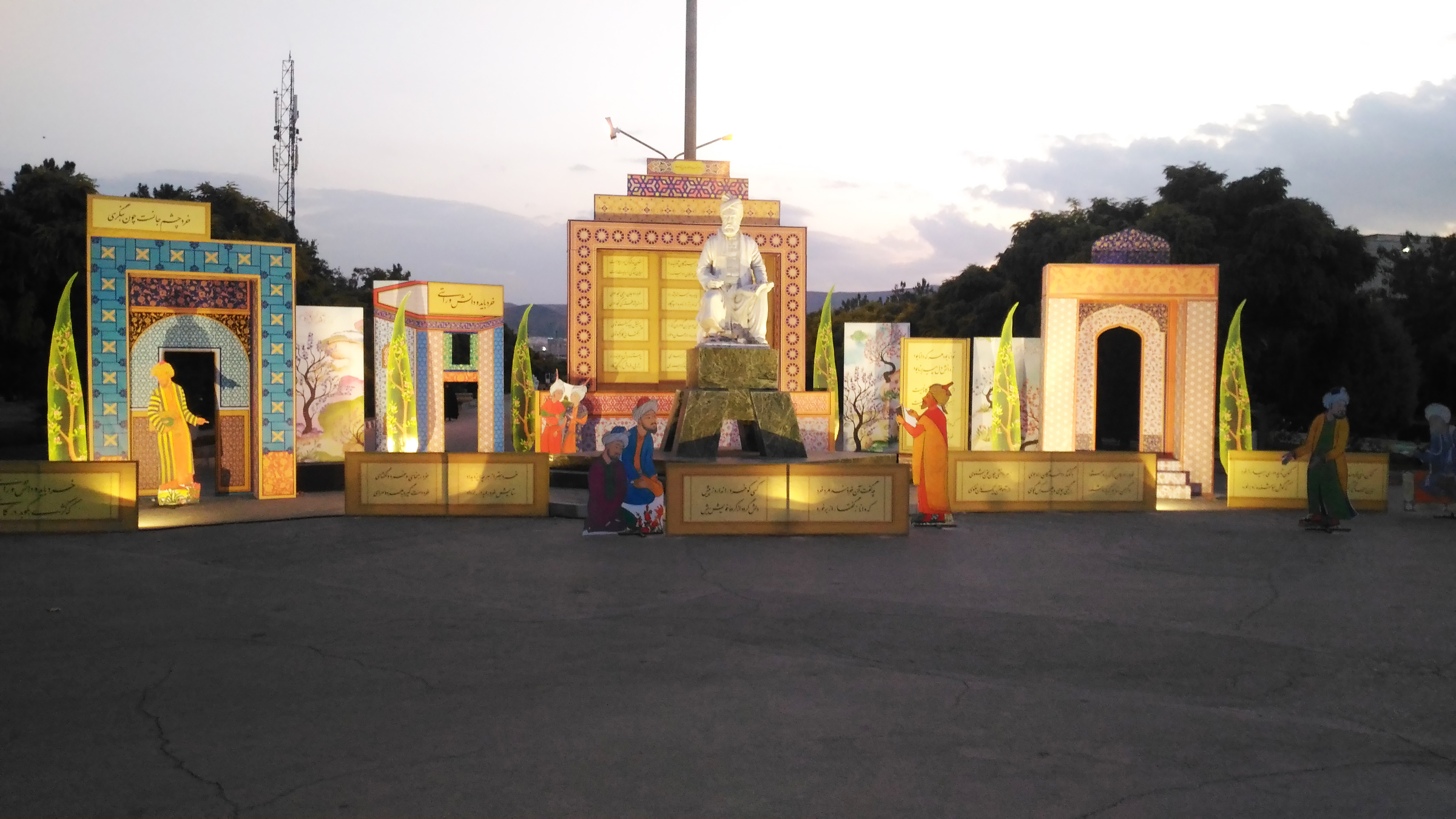
Ferdowsi University of Mashhad 70th Anniversary (1949–2019)

== History ==
If the upgrading of the College of Health to the status of Faculty of Medicine in 1949 is regarded as the first step in establishing the Ferdowsi University of Mashhad, the university is the fifth oldest in Iran after the universities of Tehran (1934), Tabriz (1947), Shiraz (1946) and Isfahan (1946), not counting the founding of other academic colleges such as the Westminster Medical College (1878), now Urmia University.

Mashhad Faculty of Medicine is part of Mashhad University of Medical Sciences, which merged with the Faculty of Literature to form the University of Mashhad in 1954 when the new faculty opened with five different fields. With the expansion of higher education, the following faculties were subsequently established: Faculty of Theology, Faculty of Science, Faculty of Dentistry, Faculty of Pharmaceutical Sciences and Nutrition, Faculty of Education and Psychology, Faculty of Agriculture, Faculty of Engineering, the Institute of Optometry, the university's high school, and the Teaching Center. Mashhad University was renamed Ferdowsi University in 1974.

Before the 1979 Iranian revolution, the curriculum and research agenda at Ferdowsi were designed with the collaboration of Georgetown University, but this was halted after the revolution.

The university has one of the largest campuses in Iran.

After emerging regional health organizations in the universities of medical sciences in 1994, Mashhad University of Medical Sciences was separated from Ferdowsi University. Meanwhile, a number of new faculties and schools such as Faculty of Administration and Economics, Faculty of Veterinary Sciences, Shirvan Agricultural College, Faculty of Physical Education and Sports, Faculty of Mathematical Sciences, Neishaboor Faculty of the Arts, Institute of Plantation Science, The Seismology Research Center, the University's College, Faculty of Natural Resources and Environment, Faculty of Architecture and Urban Planning were established one after the other.

== Academics ==
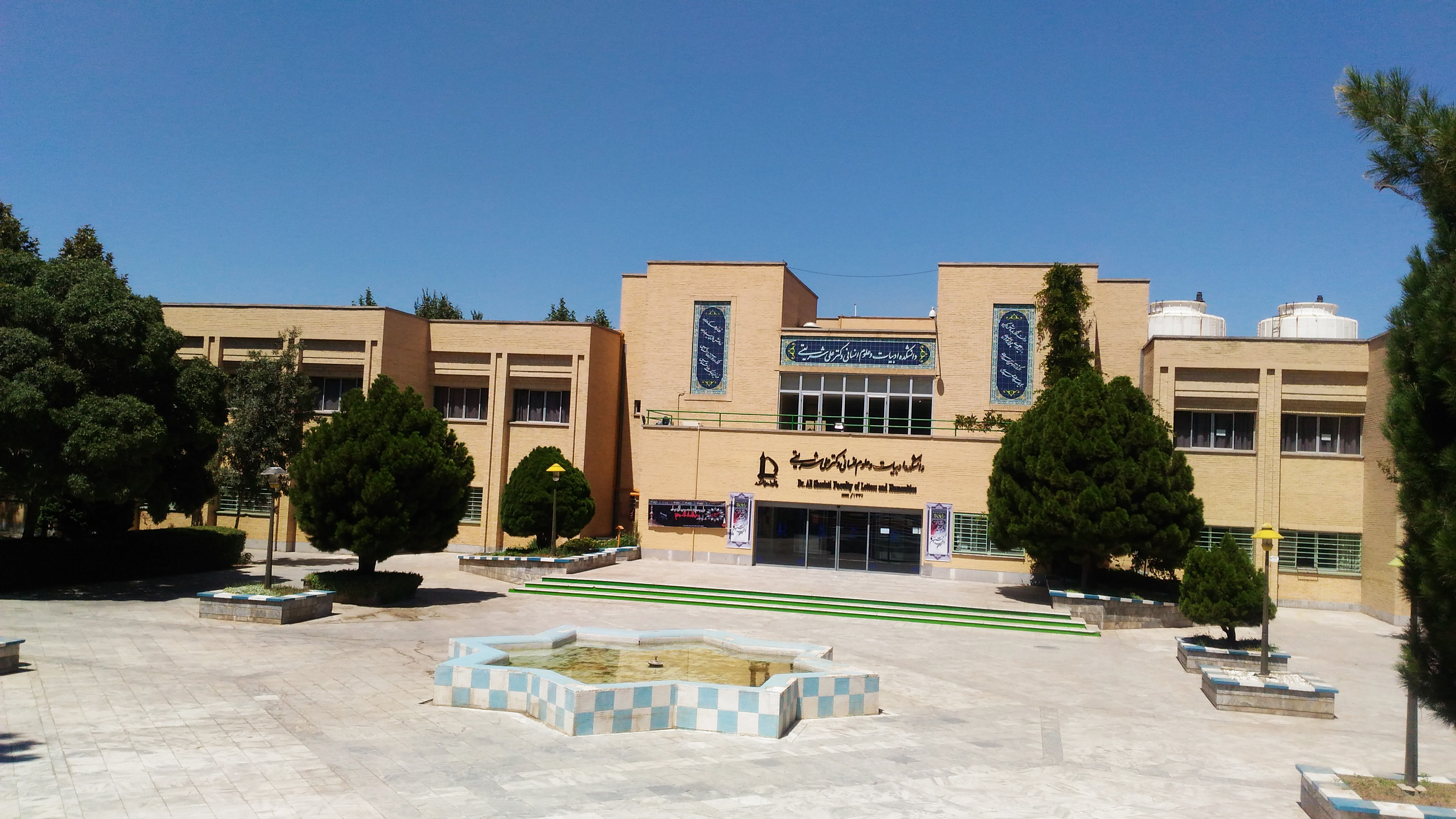
Faculty of Literature and Humanities - Ferdowsi University of Mashhad

=== School of Letters and Humanities ===
Founded in 1955, the School of Letters and Humanities offers graduate and postgraduate degrees in the fields of Persian language and literature, English language and literature, Arabic language and literature, French language and literature, Russian language and literature, geography, Iranian history, social sciences, and linguistics. The Faculty has 83 academic members, 4500 undergraduate and 500 graduate students. The departments offer B.A., M.A., and PhD programs. Moreover, the Department of Persian Language and Literature is designated by the Iranian Ministry of Science, Research and Technology, as a Center of Excellence in Ferdowsi Studies.

=== School of Economics and Business Administration ===
Founded in 1988, the Faculty of Economics and Administrative Sciences has 53 faculty members and 2146 students. The programs offered at the Bachelors, Masters and Ph.D. levels are Economic Science, Law, Accounting, Political Science, and Management.

The Research Center for the Economy of Eastern Iran and Neighboring Countries was established in 2006 for the purpose of conducting research into the economy of Iran and the neighboring countries. The Center has 11 economics specialists engaged in research projects.

Majors and programs offered in the Faculty of Economics are:

- Economic Sciences – Business Economics
- Economic Sciences – Theoretical Economics
- Economic Sciences
- Economic Development and Planning
- Business Management
- Industrial Management
- Accounting
- Law
- Public Management
- Political science

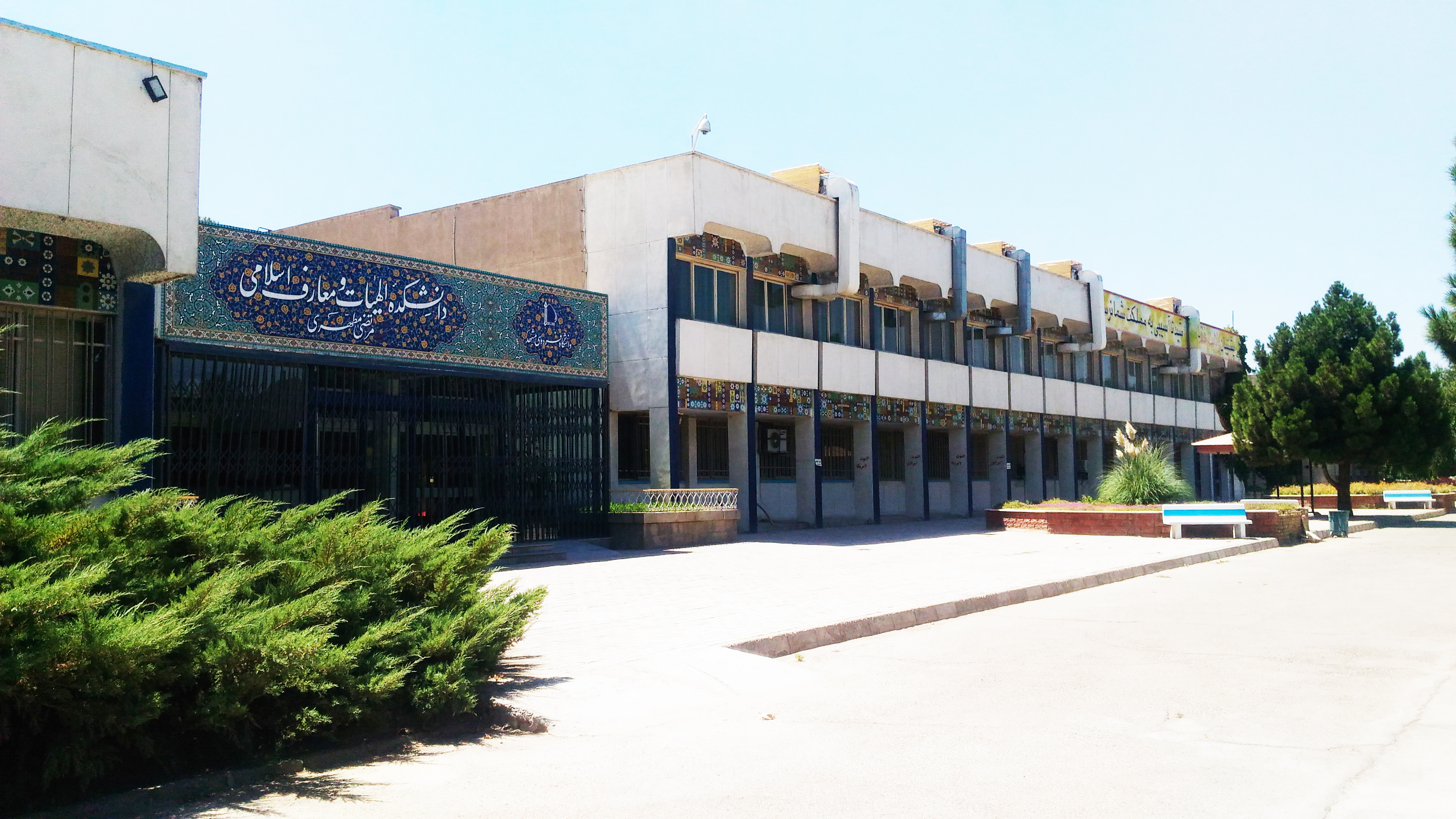
Faculty of Theology - Ferdowsi University of Mashhad

=== School of Theology ===
Founded in 1958, the School of Theology has 48 faculty members and comprises five departments: Islamic History and Civilization, Islamic Philosophy, Islamic Jurisprudence, Koranic Studies, and Comparative Religion and Mysticism. The school offers programs at Bachelors, Masters, and PhD levels.

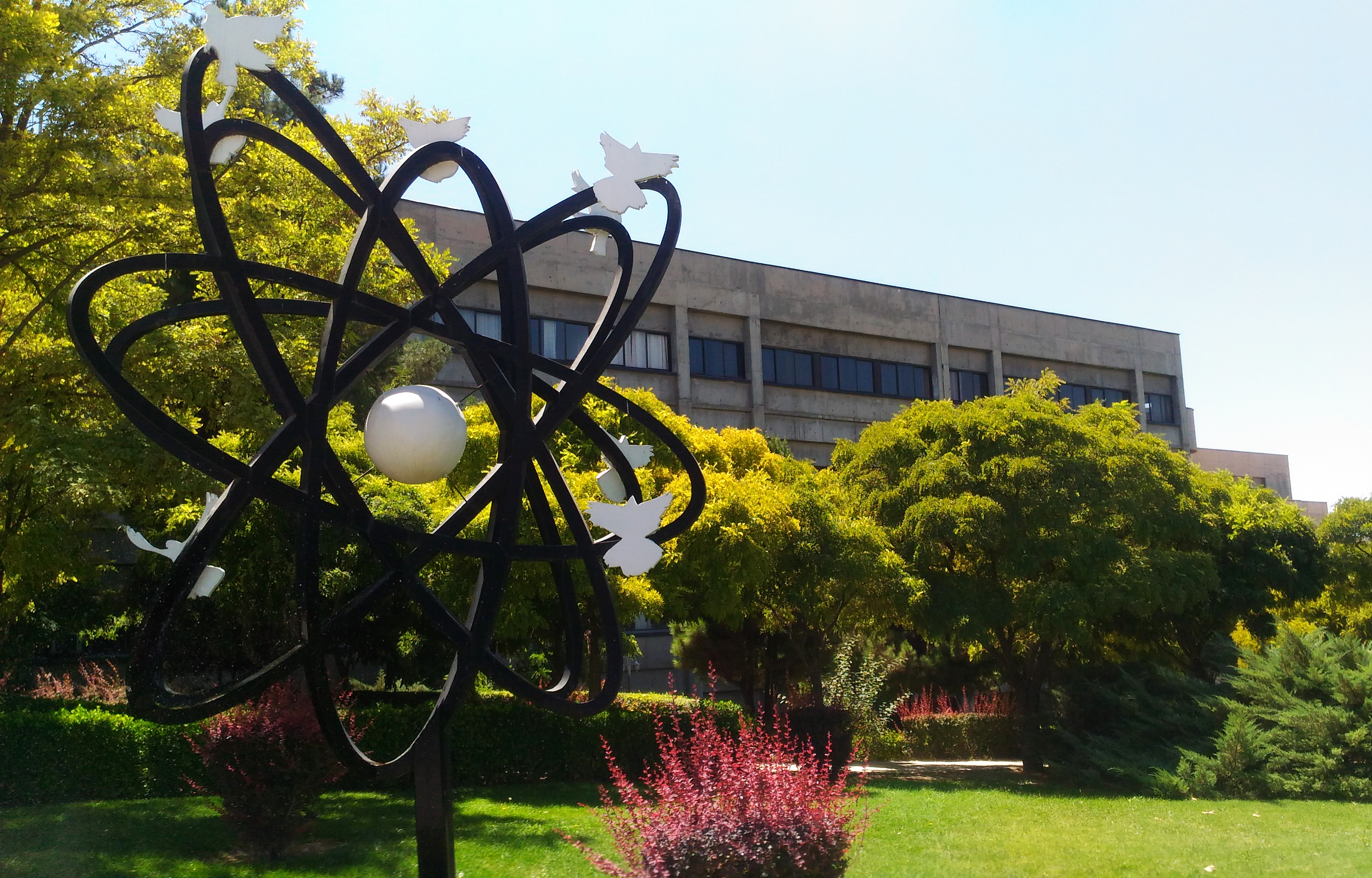
Faculty of Science - Ferdowsi University of Mashhad

=== School of Sciences ===
Established in 1961, the School of Sciences has 97 faculty members, 1862 undergraduates, 325 Master's students, and 81 PhD students. The faculty comprises four departments: Biology, Chemistry, Geology, and Physics. Of these, the Department of Geology has been named as a Center of Excellence in Fossilogy by the Iranian Ministry of Sciences, Research and Technology. The research centers at the School of Sciences include the Centers for Research in Seismology, Rodentology, Nanotechnology, Biotechnology (Stem Cell & Molecular Research), and Environmental Chemistry, to name but a few.

=== School of Mathematical Sciences ===
Founded in 1996, the School of Mathematical Sciences has three departments: Applied Mathematics, Pure Mathematics and Statistics. The school has 45 academic members and approximately 1,300 students. Currently, there are 170 graduates enrolled. The School of Mathematical Sciences offers three programs specializing in Pure Mathematics, Applied Mathematics and Statistics at Bachelors, Masters and Ph.D. levels. Both the Departments of Mathematics and Statistics were named centers of excellence by the Ministry of Science, Research and Technology in 2000.

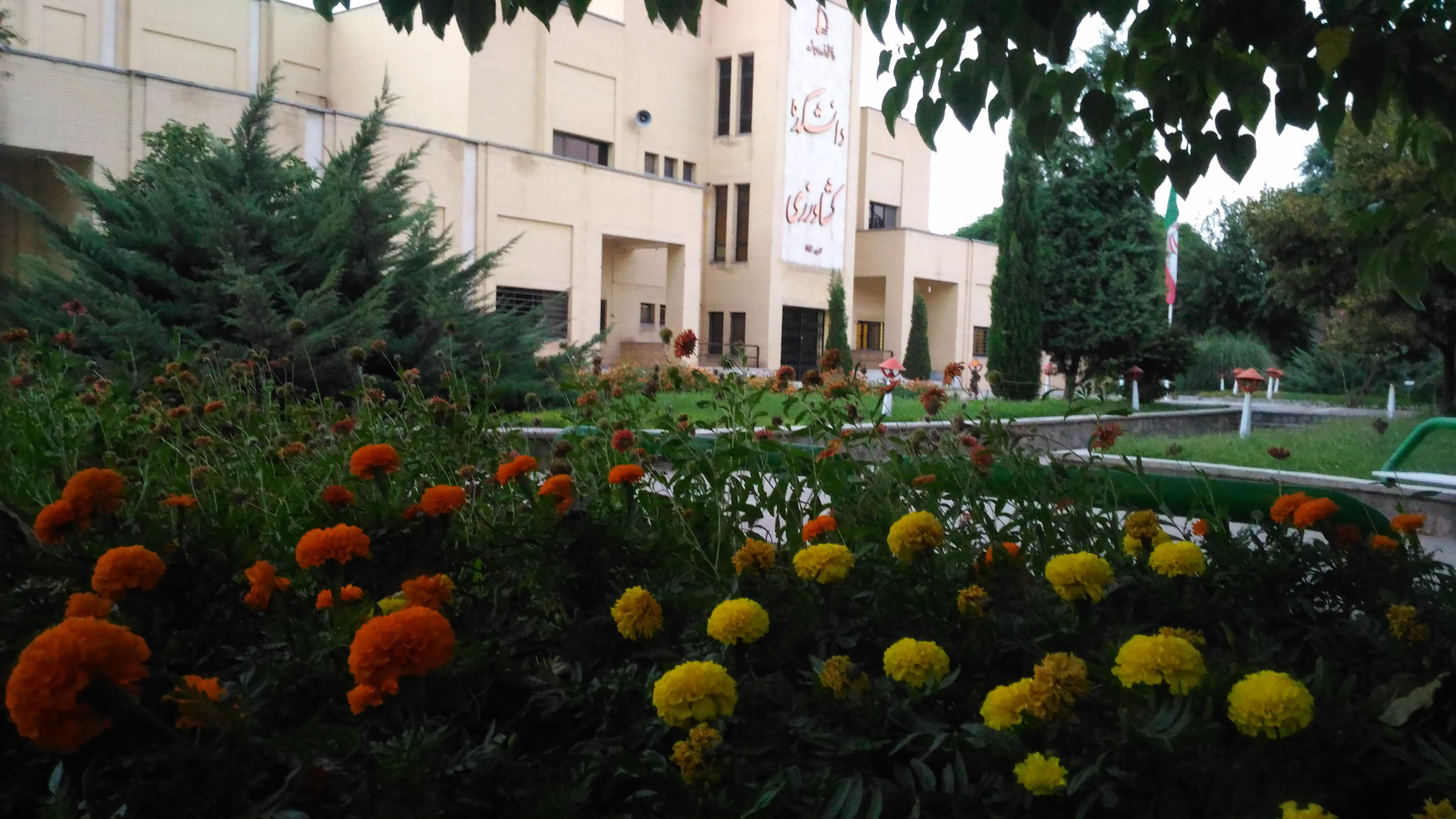
Faculty of Agriculture - Ferdowsi University of Mashhad

=== School of Agriculture ===
Established in 1973, the School of Agriculture has 101 faculty members and 1622 students. The college comprises the departments of Agricultural Economics, Agricultural Machinery, Agronomy, Animal Sciences, Food Science Industry, Gardening, Plant Pathology, Plant Breeding and Biotechnology, Soil Sciences, and Water Engineering. The College of Agriculture offers 10 programs: Agricultural Economics, Agricultural Machinery, Agronomy, Animal Sciences, Food Industry Science, Gardening, Plant Pathology, Plant Breeding and Biotechnology, Soil Sciences, and Water Engineering; these programs are offered at Bachelors, Masters, and Ph.D. levels.

=== School of Education and Psychology ===
Established in 1973, the FUM School of Education and Psychology is home to 30 faculty members and about 1300 students. The school consists of 11 departments offering graduate and post-graduate programs in the fields of the educational management and planning, curriculum planning, education of disabled youth, pre-K education, the philosophy of education, clinical psychology, psychology of the disabled, general psychology, educational psychology, family counseling, and library and information sciences.

=== School of Veterinary Medicine ===
Founded in 1991, the School of Veterinary Medicine has 37 faculty members and consists of the departments of Basic Sciences, Patho-biology, Clinical Sciences, and Agri-food Hygiene. There are 400 enrollees majoring in the B.Sc., Doctor of Veterinary Medicine (D.V.M.), Doctor of Veterinary Science (D.V.Sc.), and Ph.D. levels. The programs and degrees offered are Large Animal Internal Medicine (D.V.Sc.), Veterinary Parasitology (Ph.D.), Veterinary Biotechnology (Ph.D.), Veterinary Pathobiology (D.V.Sc.), Comparative Histology (Ph.D.), Doctorate in Veterinary Medicine (D.V.M.), and Veterinary Laboratory Sciences (B.Sc.). Faculty members are actively engaged in education and research in areas as diverse as clinical practice, domestic animal health and diseases, food safety, biology and public health. More importantly, the Research Center for Ruminant Abortion and Neonatal Mortality Studies is considered to be a Center of Excellence of the Faculty of Veterinary Medicine.

=== Faculty of Engineering ===
On February 25, 1975, the Faculty of Engineering was established to serve as the leading engineering institution for the eastern part of Iran. In September 1975 (Mehr 1354), the Faculty of Engineering officially started its mission by admitting 30 students in the Electrical Engineering major and 30 students in Mechanical Engineering.

Courses are offered in B.Eng., M.Sc., Ph.D. in Electrical Engineering, Mechanical Engineering, Civil Engineering, Computer Engineering, Materials Engineering and B.Eng., M.Eng in Chemical Engineering, Industrial Engineering. The Electrical Engineering group of Ferdowsi University has many prominent research labs such as the integrated System Lab., corrosion and coating Lab. etc. According to Iranwatch (Tracking Iran's Unconventional Weapon Capabilities) in 2011, research on solid propellant combustion (for rocket motor chamber), air-to-air missile fuse electronics, robust controller design for a missile's yaw-channel, coastal missile defense systems as well as remotely piloted vehicle's guidance, navigation, and control computer system is being done in the university.

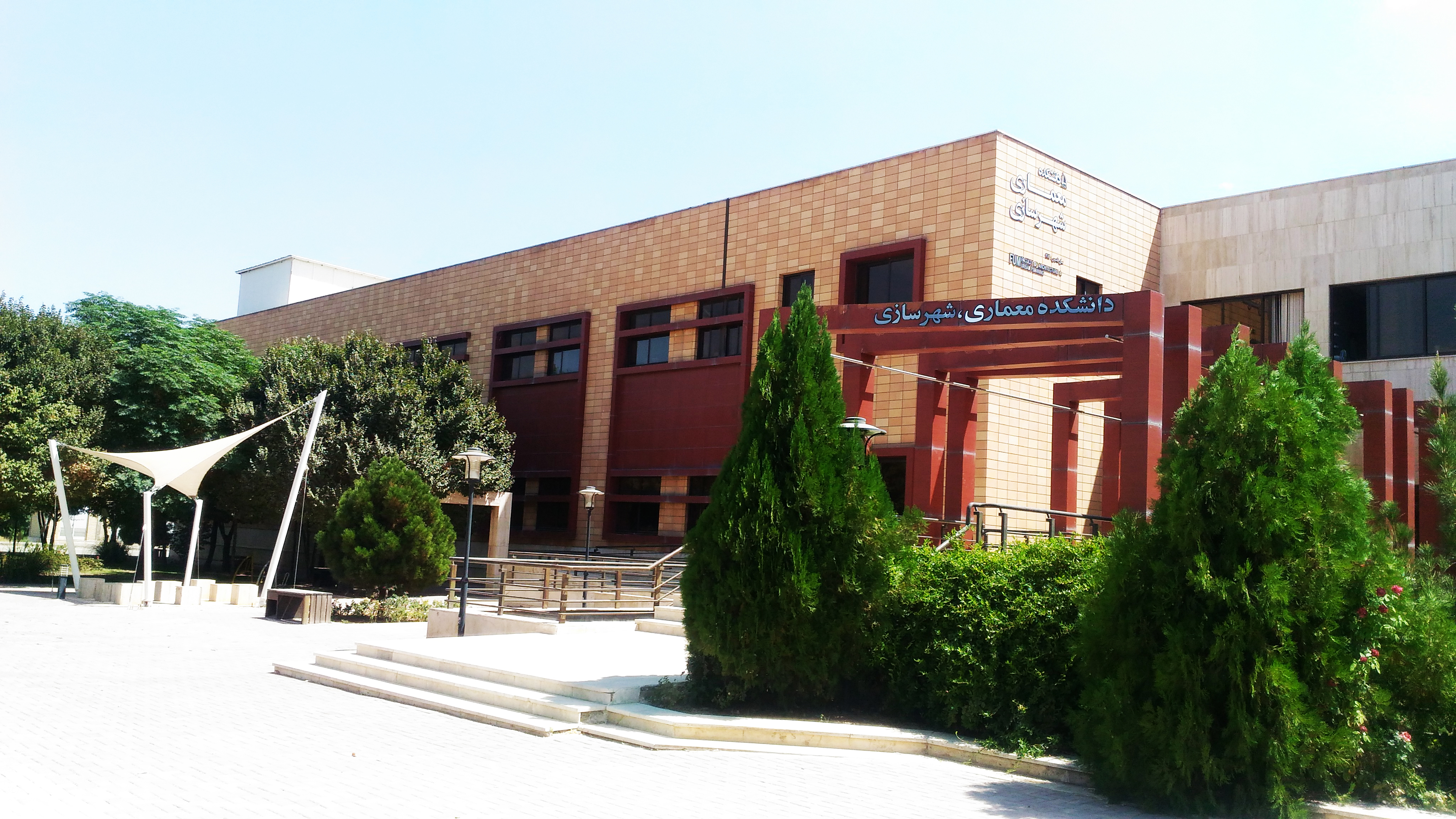
Faculty of Architecture and Urban Planning - Ferdowsi University of Mashhad

=== Faculty of Architecture, Urbanism and Islamic Art ===
In July 2005, faculty of Architecture was founded in Ferdowsi university of Mashhad which consists of two distinct departments, Architecture Engineering and Urban planning. Each department offer courses at bachelors and masters levels.

=== Research Institute of Biotechnology ===
Institute of Biotechnology was established in 2006 for the promotion of biotechnological research of the university. The following groups are active:

- Cell and Molecular Biotechnology Research Group
- Veterinary Biotechnology Research Group
- Agriculture and Animal Biotechnology Research Group
- Cell Biology and Biotechnology of Embryo Research Group

=== Sun & Air Research Institute (SARI) ===
SARI institute was founded in October 2010 (Mehr 1389), for research in the field of Renewable energy. This institute has achieved design and manufacturing of 100 kW Wind turbine. At the present time, this institute focuses on the development of different types of wind and solar energy.

== Admissions ==
The admission rate range is 40–50%, making it an averagely selective institution. However, considering the strong efforts to improve the higher institutions in religious cities after the Islamic Revolution (27% of the resources allocated to the university are reported to be funded through proprietary revenues other than the governmental budget), undergraduate admission to Ferdowsi University is limited to the top 10–20% of students who pass the national entrance examination administered yearly by the Ministry of Culture and Higher Education and could not be admitted in University of Tehran, Sharif University of Technology, Amirkabir University of Technology, Iran University of Science and Technology and Shahid Beheshti University (mostly from the cities of Razavi Khorasan, and specially Mashhad). To attract top students, the university has tried to use the scholarships so that after the decline in admission rate in sciences (and especially physics), which was considered a serious threat to the university, additional scholarships are to be dedicated to all disciplines.

In 2015, there were 12,645 undergraduate students, of which 8,398 females (66.4%) and 4,247 males (33.6%).

=== Foreign students ===
The Ferdowsi University of Mashhad is regarded as the first institution in attracting foreign students, mainly from Afghanistan, Lebanon, Syria, Yemen, Bahrain, and Central Asian republics, after the efforts made during the presidency of Ahmadinejad who declared Mashhad as "Iran's spiritual capital". Currently, more than 1,300 foreign students are enrolled, which forming 5% of the student body. More than half of the foreign students are from Afghanistan, of which 106 gained scholarships, 199 passed the national entrance exam, and 204 enrolled as independent students.

According to a deputy president of the university, most of the foreign students studying in Iran are from Afghanistan, Syria, Iraq, Pakistan, and Turkey. According to Iran's Minister of Science, Research, and Technology (in a speech at a graduation ceremony of a number of foreign students of Ferdowsi University of Mashhad), many efforts were underway to attract as many as 25,000 by 2015 during the presidency of Ahmadinejad: "The improvement of the quality of universities has paved the way for the enrollment of foreign students. Fourteen thousand foreign students from 92 countries are currently studying at Iran's universities. And if we include the 12,000 foreign students studying at Al-Mustafa (International) University, a total of 26,000 foreign students are studying at higher education institutions in the country".

== International interactions ==
The university has been described as having weak connections to other institutions. According to the dean of the university, "less than 10% of our colleagues have international interactions in Ferdowsi University of Mashhad, showing a bad situation on the connection between our academics and the universities abroad so that in order to improve the cooperation with Russian universities, the Ferdowsi University of Mashhad pays the entire cost of any joint project that each of university professors have with a Russian university or a professor."

== Research and publications ==
The first books were published by FUM in 1959 (1338 SH), and the establishment of the university's publishing house (FUM Press) dates back to 1977. Since 2023, the Board of Trustees have merged the management of FUM Press and FUM Library. FUM Press publishes original and translations of academic books. The latest releases and publishing guides can be accessed on their website: https://press.um.ac.ir/index.php/en/

FUM publishes 48 peer-reviewed scientific journals covering almost all fields of sciences and humanities. Some national notable journals are, Journal of Cell and Molecular Research (JCMR), Iranian Journal of Health and Physical Activity, Iranian Journal of Animal BioSystematics, Iranian Journal of Electrical Systems, Iranian Journal of Veterinary Science Technology, Iranian Journal of Numerical Analysis and Optimization, etc.

=== SCOPUS indexed journals ===
Out of the 33 DOAJ indexed journals, six are indexed by SCOPUS:

1. Iranian Journal of Animal Biosystematics
2. Iranian Journal of Numerical Analysis and Optimization
3. Iranian Journal of Veterinary Science and Technology
4. Journal of Economic Geology
5. Journal of Agricultural Machinery, also indexed by WOS
6. Iranian Food Science and Technology Research Journal

=== Student run journals ===
Numerous journals are published by student associations, all of which are available online. The 13th Titr (English meaning: Title) festival for student run journals was hosted by FUM in 2024. The journal topics ranges from academic and general, to politics and comedy.

== International rankings ==
University rankings

Global – Overall
- ARWU World: 701–800
- CWTS World: 478
- QS World: 951-1000 (2026)
- THE World: 801–1,000
- USNWR Global: 868

Regional – Overall
- QS Asia: =218 (2025)

Times Higher Education World University Rankings :
2018: 801–1,000
2017: 801+

Academic Ranking of World Universities (Shanghai Ranking):
2017: 701–800

U.S. News:
2018: 868

- Chemistry: 481
- Engineering ranking: 260
- Materials science: 384

2017: 820

- Agricultural sciences: 180
- Engineering ranking: 252
- Materials science: 368

CWTS Leiden Ranking:
2018: (P indicator): 478
2017: (P indicator): 509
2016: (P indicator): 537

SCImago Institutions Rankings:
2017:490
2016:572
2015:558

== Famous events ==
After the controversial appearance of President Mahmoud Ahmadinejad at Columbia University on 25 September 2007, Ferdowsi University of Mashhad invited President Bush to travel to Iran and speak on campus about a range of issues, including the Holocaust, terrorism, human rights and U.S. foreign policy. The invitation asked Bush to answer questions from students and professors "just the same way" that Ahmadinejad took questions "despite all the insults directed at him." The White House said that Bush would be willing to travel to Iran, but under different circumstances: "President Bush looks forward to traveling to a democratic Iran, an Iran where its leaders allow freedom of speech and assembly for all of its people and an Iran where the leaders mourn the victims of the Holocaust, not call for the destruction of Israel," National Security Council spokesman Gordon Johndroe said.

Some Iranian educational institutions such as Ferdowsi University of Mashhad have also been building their presence in Afghanistan. As Iranian officials announced in February 2009, the university opened a campus in Herat (named after a Persian poet who resided in Herat during the eleventh century)—the efforts that allow Iran to engage directly with Afghanistan's population and develop close ties with religious and ethnic minorities.

In 2011, Ferdowsi University's Department of Engineering in Mashhad said it would segregate students by gender in nearly 50 courses. One year before, a few general courses at Ferdowsi, such as general mathematics and physics, imposed separate classes for men and women. The disciplinary restrictions imposed on students, particularly female students, had been on the rise since June 2009, in many cases accompanied with insults and degradation of students.

== Professor's Basij Organization (PBO) ==
The emergence of Mahmud Ahmadinejad in the 2005 presidential election brought a new force to Iran's political power, namely, the Professor's Basij Organization (PBO). PBO offices were established at a few large universities, including Ferdowsi University of Mashhad. The military, Basij, and IRGC veterans teaching at these universities welcomed the establishment and inauguration of the Basij bureaus at universities, as most of them were already enrolled in such bureaus in other settings. The number of the registered members of the Professor's Basij Organization in Razavi Khorasan is 2 thousand and 500, most of whom belong to the Ferdowsi University of Mashhad (it has 900 faculty members). According to the head of Razavi Khorasan's PBO, the number of Basiji professors is much greater than the number of the registered PBO members. 4,000 students of Mashhad's universities (mostly the Ferdowsi University of Mashhad) have registered in the Basij Organization.

== Notable alumni ==
- Ali-Akbar Fayyaz, founder of the School of Letters and Humanities, Professor in the Department of Persian Language and Literature between 1950 and 1972, a renowned historian of early Islam and literary critic
- Ali Shariati, assistant professor in the Department of History at FUM between 1966 and 1971, who was compelled to resign from the university; globally renowned leftist-Islamic writer and lecturer, and the ideological father of the 1979 revolution
- Mohammad Mokhtari, graduate of the Department of Persian Language and Literature, a renowned poet, novelist, and literary critic, and a leading member of the Iranian P.E.N. in the 1980s and 1990s who was assassinated by elements from the Ministry of Intelligence of the Islamic Republic in 1999 as a victim of what was later labeled in Iranian political jargon "chain murders"
- Mohammad Reza Shafiei-Kadkani, graduate of the School of Letters and Humanities at FUM, professor of Persian Language and Literature at the University of Tehran, celebrated contemporary poet and literary critic
- Abdulaziz Sachedina, graduate of history from FUM, currently professor of religious studies at the University of Virginia
- Amir Khajepour, professor in mechanical engineering at the University of Waterloo, Ontario, Canada
- Seyed Ali Mirlohi Falavarjani, Retired Professor, Founder of Islamic Azad University of Falavarjan in 1984
- Seyyed Jalal al-Addin Ashtiani professor of philosophy
- Effat Shariati (born 1952) is a former Member of the Parliament of Iran,
- Laleh Eftekhari (Persian: لاله افتخاری) is an Iranian conservative politician and former member of the Parliament of Iran representing Tehran, Rey, Shemiranat and Eslamshahr.
- Abdolreza Rahmani Fazli (عبدالرضا رحمانی فضلی in Persian; born 1959) is an Iranian conservative politician, government official and interior minister of Hassan Rouhani's government.
- Mahmoud Alavi (Persian: محمود علوی; born 4 May 1954) is an Iranian cleric, politician and the minister of intelligence in Hassan Rouhani's government.
- Mohammad Abbasi, is a former conservative Member of the Parliament of Iran as well as minister of cooperatives and minister of youth affairs and sports of President Mahmoud Ahmadinejad.
- Soheyla Feyzbakhsh, mathematician at Imperial College London.

== See also ==
- List of Islamic educational institutions
