= Ali-Akbar Fayyaz =

Iranian professor (1898–1971)

Ali-Akbar Fayyaz (Persian: علی‌اکبر فیاض; 1898–1971, born in Mashhad) was a distinguished professor of Islamic heresiography and Persian language and literature at Tehran University and the Ferdowsi University of Mashhad. Fayyaz was born into a family of Shiite clerics in Mashhad, northeastern Iran. His father, Sayyid Abdul-Majid Thaqat al-Islam, was his first teacher, inculcating in him a profound knowledge of Arabic and the basics of Islamic sciences. Fayyaz completed his official studies in Mashhad and secured a job in the administration of the Mashhad holy shrine endowments. In 1929, Fayyaz became the principal at the Shah-Reza High School, one of the first and most accredited modern schools in Mashhad. In 1936, the Ministry of Education appointed him to the post of principal at the Teachers' Training College in Mashhad.

In 1938, Fayyaz became a librarian in the Faculty of Letters at Tehran University and started his studies in the field of Persian language and literature, receiving a Ph.D. in 1943. The same year 1943, Fayyaz was promoted to a teaching position in the Faculty of Theology at Tehran University. During this period, he was teaching the history of Islam and Islamic heresiography.

In 1950, Fayyaz returned to Mashhad to establish a Faculty of Letters there. He taught for most of the 1950s in the newly founded faculties of letters and theology at the University of Mashhad, where he was the dean. He later returned to Tehran University to serve as the head of the Department of Religious Studies. Fayyaz retired from his academic posts in 1967, and took up residence for the rest of his life in Mashhad.

== Literary and academic achievements ==
In the 1930s, Fayyaz served as the head of a literary circle in Mashhad named Anjuman-i adabi bahār. It was during his residence in Mashhad that Fayyaz held the post of editor-in-chief of the literary journal Nāma-yi Āstān-i Quds. Fayyaz was a close friend of Iranian diplomat, litterateur, and physician Dr. Qasim Ghani. Fayyaz and Ghani jointly edited Tarikh-i Bayhaqi, one of the most important chronicles and pieces of prose in Persian written by the Ghaznavid scribe and bureaucrat Abu'l-Fadl Bayhaqi (d. 1078). Later in his life, Fayyaz acquired more manuscripts of this work and his own edition of Bayhaqi's chronicle was posthumously published by the Ferdowsi University of Mashhad Press in 1972. Fayyaz was a polyglot scholar mastered in Arabic, French, English, and Russian and just started to learn Chinese shortly before his death in 1972.
