= Abdolkarim Haeri Yazdi =

Iranian Grand Ayatollah (1859–1937)

Grand Ayatollah Hajj Sheikh Abdolkarim Haeri Yazdi
- عبدالکریم حائری یزدی
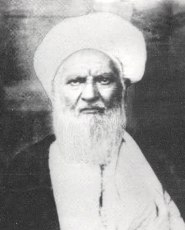
- The founder of an important Islamic seminary (hawza) in Qom, Iran
- Title: Grand Ayatollah

Personal life
- Born: 1859 Meybod, Yazd province, Sublime State of Iran
- Died: 30 January 1937 (aged 77–78)
- Resting place: Fatima Masumeh Shrine, Qom
- Children: 3, including Morteza Haeri Yazdi and Mehdi Haeri Yazdi
- Occupation: Marja' and scholar

Religious life
- Religion: Shia Islam
- Sect: Usuli Twelver

Senior posting
- Post: Founder and patron, Qom Seminary
- Period in office: 1900–1937
- Students: Ayatollah Borqei, Ruhollah Khomeini, Abolhasan Rafii Qazvini, Mohammad-Reza Golpaygani, Mohammad Ali Araki, Sayeed Shahabuddin Marashi Najafi, Jafar Eshraghi, Sayeed Ahmad Zanjan, Ayatollah Haj Mirza Khalil Kamareyi, Mohammad Mohaghegh Damad, Shamseddin Mataji Kojouri, Mirza Hashem Amoli

Grand Ayatollah Hajj Sheikh Abdolkarim Haeri Yazdi (Persian: عبدالکریم حائری یزدی; Arabic: عبد الكريم الحائري اليزدي ALA-LC: ʻAbd al-Karīm al-Ḥāʼirī al-Yazdī; 1859 – 30 January 1937) was an Iranian Twelver Shia Muslim scholar and marja. He was the founder of an important Islamic seminary (hawza) in Qom, Iran.

Among his students was Ruhollah Khomeini. Haeri's granddaughter, Masoumeh Haeri Yazdi, married Mostafa Khomeini, the eldest son of Ruhollah Khomeini.

== Early life ==
Haeri was born in the city of Meybod in Mehrjard village in southeastern Iran. He studied at Yazd, then at Samarra under Grand Ayatollah Mirza Hassan Shirazi, and completed his training at Najaf with Mohammad-Kazem Khorasani and Mohammed Kazem Yazdi. In 1906, he reportedly became disenchanted with the politicization from the Iranian Constitutional Revolution and moved back to Najaf, Iraq. When Najaf became political, he moved to Karbala until political excitement cooled in 1913 when he moved back to Arak in Iran. By 1921, he was a "well-known and respected teacher" and "good administrator" and he accepted an invitation of Mullahs in Qom "to act as doyen" to the circles of learning in that Shrine town.

Under Haeri, Qom moved from a respectable provincial Madrasah to a major center of learning close to the level of Najaf. Although "some of his contemporaries outshone" him as jurisconsults, Haeri became the marja for "many religious Iranians."

Haeri's quietism was reflected in his willingness to meet cordially with both Ahmad Shah Qajar and Prime Minister Reza Khan.

== Qom Seminary ==
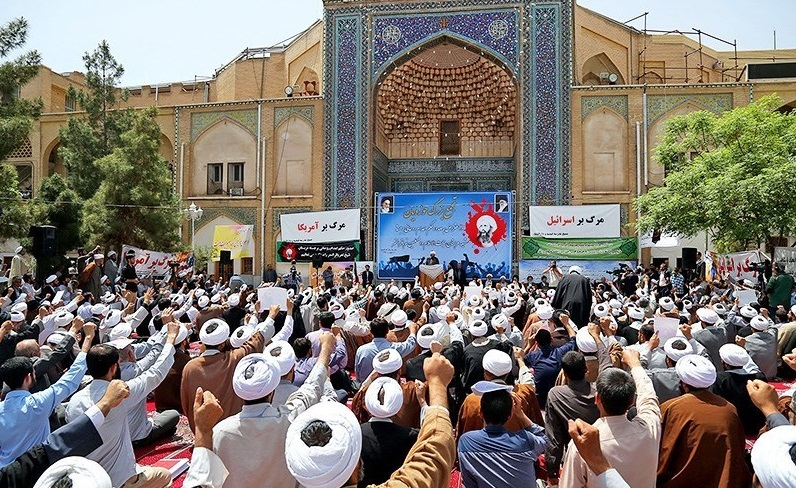
Qom Seminary

In 1921, Ayatollah Haeri accepted the invitation of the people of Qom and arrived there with his eldest son. Two months after his arrival, he attended a meeting regarding the formation of a hawza at the residence of Ayatollah Paeen Shahri. This meeting included businessmen, esteemed scholars, and jurists, such as Ayatollah Bafqi, Ayatollah Kabir, and Ayatollah Faiz. The meeting lasted for several hours, and the final decision was entrusted to Ayatollah Haeri.

Ayatullah Haeri initially believed that the Hawza in Qom should be established by the elders and residents of the city. However, due to the persistent encouragement of learned scholars, he accepted the responsibility on one condition: he will perform an Istikhara to determine whether it is feasible for me to remain in Qom and invite the students and teachers who are awaiting my return. Early the next morning, before leading the Salat al-Fajr, Ayatullah Haeri reached for a Qur'an and stood in the Fatima Masumeh Shrine, engaging in dua before performing the Istikhara. It is noted that Ayatullah Haeri typically did not perform Istikhara using the Qur'an, as he believed he could not fully comprehend whether the verses were favorable or unfavorable. However, when he performed the Istikhara regarding his decision to stay in Qom, he entrusted everything to Allah. The verse that was revealed to him was: "this shirt of mine and cast it upon my father's face; he will regain his sight, and bring me all your folks left him with no doubt about his future direction." Consequently, he immediately began the task of establishing a Hawza and wrote to all his former students in Arak, inviting them to come to Qom.

== Students ==
- Ayatollah Borqei
- Ruhollah Khomeini
- Abolhasan Rafii Qazvini
- Mohammad-Reza Golpaygani
- Mohammad Ali Araki
- Sayeed Shahabuddin Marashi Najafi
- Jafar Eshraghi
- Sayeed Ahmad Zanjan
- Ayatollah Haj Mirza Khalil Kamareyi
- Mohammad Mohaghegh Damad
- Shamseddin Mataji Kojouri
- Mirza Hashem Amoli

== See also ==
- List of Islamic studies scholars
- List of maraji
- List of ayatollahs
