= Mohammad-Reza Golpaygani =

Iranian Grand Ayatollah (1899–1993)

Grand Ayatollah Sayyid Mohammad-Reza Golpayegani
- محمدرضا گلپایگانی
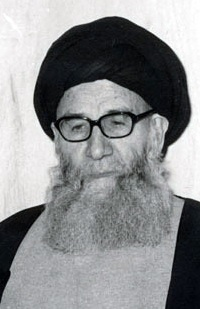
- Title: Grand Ayatollah

Personal life
- Born: Mohammad-Reza Golpayegani; March 20, 1899 (8th Dhu al-Qi'dah 1316 AH) Golpayegan, Sublime state of Persia
- Died: December 9, 1993 (aged 94) Qom, Iran
- Resting place: Fatima Masumeh Shrine, Qom
- Era: Modern history
- Occupation: Marja' scholar

Religious life
- Religion: Shia Islam

Senior posting
- Influenced by: Abdul-Karim Ha'eri Yazdi, Seyyed Muhammad Hasan Khansari, Ayatollah Haeri, Ayatollah Muhammad Taqi Golpayegani, Ayatollah Muhammad Baqer Golpayegani, Ayatollah Muhammad Reza masjed Shahi Isfahani, Allameh Naieni, Allameh Sheykh Muhammad Hossein Qaravi Esfahani, Ayatollah Borujerdi, Muhaqeq Iraqi, Seyyed Abul Hasan Isfahani, Sheykh Abul Qasem Kabir
- Influenced: Morteza Haeri Yazdi, Ali Meshkini, Morteza Motahhari, Akbar Hashemi Rafsanjani, Mohammad Beheshti, Ahmad Jannati, Mir Asadollah Madani, Morteza Moghtadai, Mohammad Mofatteh, Lotfollah Safi Golpaygani, Mohammad Alavi Gorgani, Naser Makarem Shirazi

Mohammad-Reza Golpaygani (Persian: محمدرضا گلپایگانی; March 20, 1899 – December 9, 1993) was an Iranian Shia marja'. He was born in 1899 in Gogad village near the city of Golpaygan, Iran. He was taught preliminary studies by his father, Mohammad Bagher. At the age of 9, his father died and he later on moved to Golpaygan to continue his studies. He was one of the highest-ranking Shia clergies to participate in the Iranian Revolution, and a one-time serious contender to succeed Ruhollah Khomeini in the 1989 Iranian supreme leader election. However, his candidacy was voted down by the Assembly of Experts, in favor of the eventual successor, Ali Khamenei.

== Family and early life ==
Ayatollah Seyyed Mohammad-Reza Golpayegani's father, Sayyed Muhammad Bagher, was a great scholar who made sure that his son learned primary education and religious sciences under great masters. At the age of 20, he moved to Arak to study under Abdul-Karim Ha'eri Yazdi and became one of his most noteworthy students. After completing his education and achieving high scientific and spiritual positions, he started teaching and went on to become one of the most important masters of his time. After Ha'eri Yazdi and Ayatollah Mohammad Taghi Khansari founded the hawza of Qom, he moved there and delivered lectures in the Islamic Seminary.

== Works ==
He wrote many treatises and books about Jurisprudence and Islam, among them:

- The book of Hajj in 3 volumes
- The Guiding for whom Have Velayah
- The book of Judgment
- The book of witnesses
- Noted on Qrvah Al Vosqa
- Notes on ways of saving
- Issues of hajj
- Treatise on non-distorting of the Holy Quran
- The praying of Jumah day

== Death ==
Ayatollah Golpayegani died in 1993 in Qom, near the Fateme Masoumeh Shrine.

== See also ==
- 1989 Iranian supreme leader election
- List of ayatollahs
- Lists of maraji
