= Khomeini (surname) =

Khomeini (Iranian Persian: خمینی, romanized: Xomeyni) is an Iranian surname, derived from the Iranian city of Khomeyn. The surname is strongly associated with the Iranian Islamic revolutionary Ruhollah Khomeini.

Notable people named Khomeini include:

- Khomeini family
- Ahmad Khomeini, son of Ruhollah Khomeini
- Mostafa Khomeini, son of Ruhollah Khomeini
- Hussein Khomeini, grandson of Ruhollah Khomeini
- Hassan Khomeini, grandson of Ruhollah Khomeini, son of Ahmad Khomeini

== See also ==
- Bandar-e Emam Khomeyni
- Political thought and legacy of Ruhollah Khomeini
- Imam Khomeini International Airport
- Kamaneh
- Khomeyn (disambiguation)
- Khameni
