= Khomeini family =

Religious family in Iran

Khomeini family خاندان خمینی
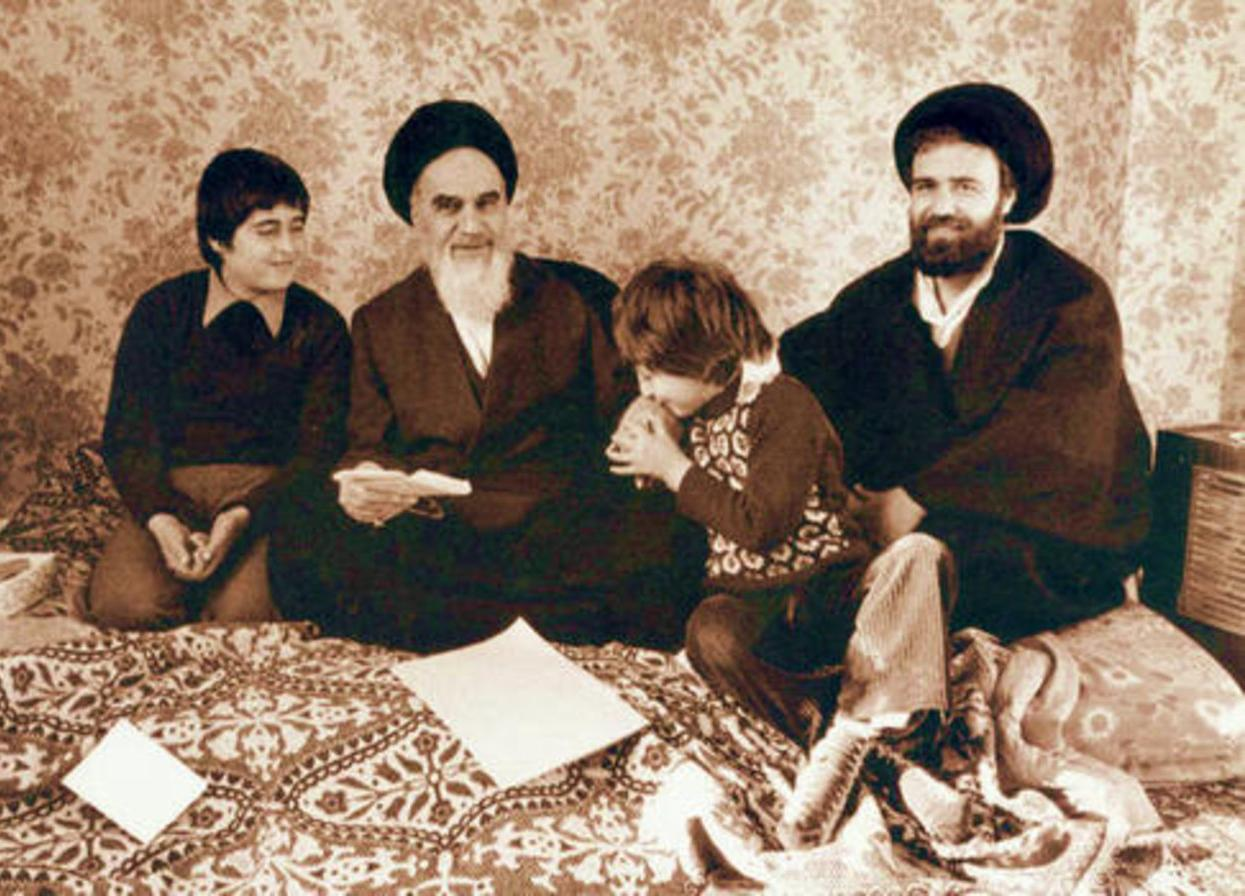
- From left to right: Ali Eshraghi (Ruhollah Khomeini's grandson), Ruhollah Khomeini, Hassan and Ahmad Khomeini
- Parent family: Quraysh (claimed); Banu Hashim (claimed); Al-Musawi
- Earlier spellings: Nishapuri; Hindi; Musawi
- Origin: Nishapur, Sublime State of Iran as of Din Ali Shah
- Founded: 1700s
- Founder: Zayn al-'Abidin al-Musavi
- Current head: Hassan Khomeini
- Distinctions: Musa al-Kadhim (claimed)
- Traditions: Twelver Shia Islam
- Heirlooms: Mausoleum of Khomeini

The Khomeini family (Note: Iranian Persian: خاندان خمینی, romanized: xândân-e xomeyni, Iranian Persian pronunciation: [xomejˈniː]) (Note: Also transliterated as Khomeyni or Khumaini or Khumayni) is an Iranian family of Persian origin with a long-standing religious tradition. Its most prominent member, Ruhollah Khomeini, served as the first supreme leader of Iran from the Islamic Revolution of 1979 until his death in 1989. Other than Khomeini himself, the family were largely politically inactive during his lifetime. Khomeini advised his family members not to enter politics during his lifetime, and, following his death, the family held minimal political influence, despite the efforts of some descendants to enter politics. They were succeeded by the Khamenei family following the election of Ali Khamenei as supreme leader.

The Khomeini family migrated from Nishapur (in Razavi Khorasan province, Iran), to Kintoor (in present-day Barabanki district, Awadh region, Uttar Pradesh, India) in the 18th century, and then resettled back in Iran in Khomeyn (in the Central District of Khomeyn County, Markazi province, Iran) in the early 19th century. They claim descent from the seventh Shiite Imam, Musa al-Kazim, and hence are a Musawi family.

== History and lineage ==
The family did not hold a specific surname prior to the introduction of the Iranian identity booklet (Shenasnameh) in 1921, they would normally go by Hindi, which meant "from India", since their grandfather returned to Iran following their stay in the Kingdom of Awadh in the Indian subcontinent, under the patronage of its ruler whose ancestors were Twelver Shi'a Muslims who traced their lineage back to Persia. However, after the 1921 Persian coup d'état, when Reza Shah passed a law ordering all Iranians to take a surname, Ruhollah chose for himself the surname Mostafavi ('of the lineage of Mustafa'), whilst his brother Morteza chose Pasandideh ('Pleasant'), and Nur al-Din chose Hindi.

The lineage of the Khomeini family is as follows, where bin means son of:

Ruhullah bin Mustafa bin Ahmad bin Dīn Ali Shah bin Safdar bin Amīr al-Dīn bin Ḥasan bin Yaḥya bin ʿAbd al-Hadī bin Nowrooz bin Ḥasan bin ʿAbd al-Ghanī bin Muḥammad bin Ḥaydar bin Ḥamza bin Musa al-Kāzim bin Jaʿfar as-Sādiq bin Muḥammad al-Bāqir bin ʿAli al-Sajjad bin Ḥusayn al-Shahid' bin ʿAli Ibn Abi Talib.

== Notable members ==
=== Before the first and first generation ===
- Zayn al-'Abidin al-Musavi was the great-great-grandfather of Syed Ahmad.
- Great-grandfather of Ahmad Hindi is not known.
- Grandfather of Ahmad Hindi is not known.

=== Second generation ===
- Din Ali Shah was the father of Seyed Ahmad

=== Third generation ===
- Ahmad Hindi (1800–1869) was the son of Din Ali Shah and great-great grandson of Zayn al-'Abidin al-Musavi, he was an alim. He left India, escaping colonial rule in 1830, migrating to Najaf, and then finally settling in Khomeyn in 1834.
- Three wives of Ahmad Hindi: Shirin Khanum, Bibi Khanum, and Sakineh (his friend Yusuf Khan Kamareh'i's sister)

=== Fourth generation ===
- Mustafa Musawi (1862–1903) was the son of Ahmad Hindi, and a prominent cleric. Just months after the birth of his son Ruhollah, he was fatally ambushed and shot while traveling on the road to Arak, by brothers Ja'far-Qoli Khan and Reza-Qoli Khan, who were cousins of powerful landowner Bahram Khan. The murder was reportedly motivated by his activism against the local wealthy landowners. Following the attack, his family sought justice from the central government, leading to the public execution of Ja'far-Qoli Khan in Tehran in 1904/1905.

=== Sixth generation ===
- Morteza Pasandideh (1893–1996) was the son of Mustafa Musawi, he was a scholar and poet.
- Nur-od-Din Hindi (1898–1986) was the son of Mustafa Musawi, he was an alim and lead the prayers in the Abbas shrine. He is buried in the Husayn shrine.
- Ruhollah Khomeini (1900–1989) was the son of Mustafa Musawi, he was an Iranian politician, revolutionary, and cleric. He was the founder of the Islamic Republic of Iran and the leader of the 1979 Iranian Revolution, which saw the overthrow of the last Shah of Iran, Mohammad Reza Pahlavi. Following the revolution, Khomeini became the country's Supreme Leader, a position created in the constitution of the Islamic Republic as the highest-ranking political and religious authority of the nation, which he held until his death.

=== Seventh generation ===
- Mostafa Khomeini (1930–1977) was the son of Ruhollah Khomeini, he died before the Iranian revolution.
- Ahmad Khomeini (1946–1995) was the son of Ruhollah Khomeini, he was the main assistant of his father before, during and after the Iranian Revolution. He acted as the link between his father and the officials and people. He had several decision-making positions.

=== Eighth generation ===
- Hussein Khomeini (born 1959) is the son of Mostafa Khomeini, he is a cleric, and is considered a liberal secularist and an outspoken critic of the theocratic government in Iran.
- Hassan Khomeini (born 1972) is the son of Ahmad Khomeini, he is a cleric and was appointed caretaker of the Mausoleum of Ruhollah Khomeini in 1995 where his grandfather and father are buried. He pursued a political career in 2015, and ran for the Assembly of Experts in the 2016 election. His nomination, however was rejected by the Guardian Council.
- Yasser Khomeini is the son of Ahmad Khomeini, he is a cleric and orator.
- Ali Khomeini is the son of Ahmad Khomeini.

=== Ninth generation ===
- Ahmad Khomeini (born 1997) is the son of Hassan Khomeini. He is a cleric. It is said that he is often targeted for being the son of Hassan Khomeini, someone Iran's conservative institutions are suspicious of due to his perceived sympathy for reformers.

== Family tree ==
Ruhollah Khomeini family tree

Seyyed Ahmad Musavi (c. 1800–1869)	Sakineh Kamareh'i Farqahani
Seyyed Mostafa Musavi (1862–1903)	Hajar Ahmadi	'Abdolkarim Hâ'eri Yazdi (1859–1937)
Ruhollah Musavi Khomeini (1902–1989)	Khadijeh Saqafi (1915/1916–2009)	Seyyed Nur al-Din Hindi (1898–1976)	Seyyed Morteza Pasandideh (1896–1996)	Morteza Ha'eri Yazdi (1916–1986)
Fatemeh Soltani Tabataba'i (b. 1954)	Seyyed Ahmad Khomeini (1946–1995)	Farideh Mostafavi (b. 1943)	Mohammad Hassan A'arabi (1924–2010)	Sadiqeh Mostafavi (b. 1941)	Mahmoud Boroujerdi (1934–2010)	Zahra Mostafavi (b. 1940)	Seyyed Mostafa Khomeini (1930–1977)	Masoumeh Ha'eri Yazdi (b. 1937)
Seyyed Ali Khomeini (b. 1985)	Seyyed Yaser Khomeini	Seyyed Hassan Khomeini (b. 1972)	Fereshteh A'arabi	Masih Boroujerdi	Leili Boroujerdi (b. 1963)	Maryam Khomeini (b. 1962)	Seyyed Hussein Khomeini (b. 1959)
Neda Bojnourdi (b. 1975)	Shahab al-Din Eshraqi (1923–1981)	Seyyed Mehdi Khomeini	Seyyed Ali Khomeini	Seyyed Mohammad Khomeini
Seyyed Ahmad Khomeini	Nargess Khomeini	Fereshteh Khomeini
Morteza Eshraqi (b. 1977)	Ali Eshraqi	Mohammad Taqi Eshraqi	Na'eemeh Eshraqi (b. 1965)	Nafiseh Eshraqi	Atefeh Eshraqi	Zahra Eshraghi (b. 1964)	Seyyed Mohammad Reza Khatami (b. 1959)
