= Reactions to the 2017 Tehran attacks =

International reactions to Tehran attacks

The reactions to the 2017 Tehran attacks include the responses by political and religious leaders, media and the general public, both within Iran, where the 2017 Tehran attacks took place, and from other nations and international organizations. Numerous notable establishments around the world also held memorials.

Iranian Police had increased patrols in the streets and subway stations of the capital Tehran after the attacks and also increased security proceedings at the Tehran Metro, where was threatened for a third attack by the ISIL.

The attacks embarked a wave of solidarity on internet around the world with hashtag #PrayforTehran and also symbolic sympathy in tribute to the victims such as turning off Eiffel Tower lights in Paris.

Monuments held at the cities of Iran and country's embassies around the world with lit candles and leaving flowers and holding silences to remember the victims of the attacks. A huge number of people lit candles in City Theater of Tehran and a state funeral was held on 9 June 2017 at the parliament building, where one of the attacks took place, and later at University of Tehran.

== Background ==
Two terrorist attacks were simultaneously carried out on 7 June 2017 by seven terrorists belonging to the Islamic State of Iraq and the Levant (ISIL) against the Iranian Parliament building and the Mausoleum of Ruhollah Khomeini, both in Tehran, Iran, leaving 17 civilians dead and 43 wounded. The shootings were the first terrorist attacks in Tehran in more than a decade, and the first major terror attack in the country since the 2010 Zahedan bombings. This was also the first time ISIL carried out a "successful" terrorist attack in Iranian soil and it triggered significant reactions both domestically and internationally with expected global consequences.

== Domestic responses ==
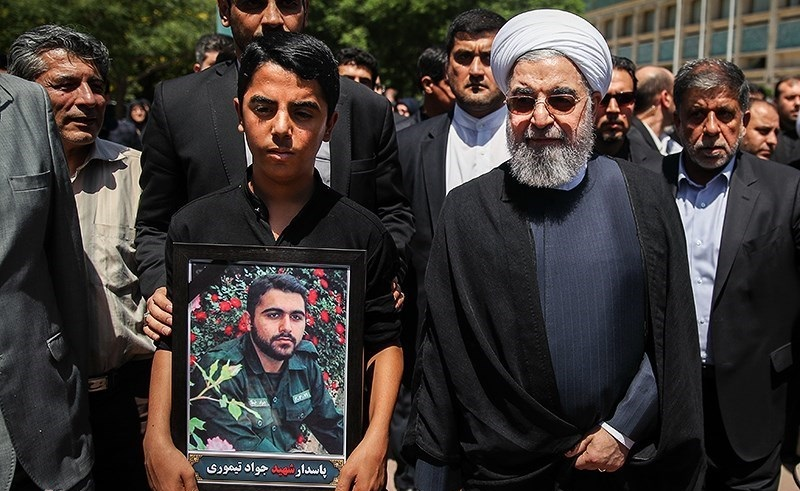
President Hassan Rouhani with the son of one of the victims

- Ali Khamenei, Supreme Leader of Iran said the Iranian nation and government won't be cowed by the "firecrackers". "Today's firecrackers will not influence the people's will," Khamenei told in his speech between hundreds of students in Tehran. He offered condolences in a message read at the funeral of victims and said "a clear sign of the evil hostility of the stooges of the arrogant (powers) toward the dignified Iranian nation and whatever related to the Islamic Revolution and Establishment and its late leader".
- President Hassan Rouhani called for regional and international cooperation and unity. He said the attack would make Iran more united in war against terrorism. "We will prove once again that we will crush the enemies' plots with more unity and more strength", Rouhani said. "Iran's message as always is that terrorism is a global problem, and unity to fight extremism, violence and terrorism with regional and international cooperation is the most important need of today's world," Rouhani said in a statement. First Vice President Eshaq Jahangiri also stated that government will promote the organized fight against radical terrorism. Iranian Minister of Foreign Affairs Javad Zarif condemned the terrorist attack in Tehran saying, "terrorism is a problem that we face in the Middle East and the whole world".
- Iranian parliament speaker Ali Larijani, who was at the parliament at the time of the attack, said in his closing statements that the attack was a "minor issue."
- Tehran Mayor Mohammad Bagher Ghalibaf tweeted "Martyred of our dear citizens in a terrorist attack have created deep scars on our hearts".
- 2017 presidential candidate and chairman of Astan Quds Razavi Ebrahim Raisi condemned the attacks and condolences. He said that "While the current situation in the Middle East is in the interest of the nations and to the detriment of powers and terrorists are near the final destruction, terrorist acts in Tehran and killing a group of civilians has no military value." He also thanked Iran's military forces involving at the incident.
- Seyed Hassan Khomeini, grandson of Ruhollah Khomeini and caretaker of the Mausoleum of Khomeini, expressed his condolences to the families of "martyrs" in "Imam's mausoleum" and "Majlis".
- Iranian Sunni leader and Zahedan Friday Prayers Imam Molavi Abdul Hamid condemned the attacks. Blasting the militants' "sinister goals", he remarked, "Blind terrorists martyred fasting people who were referred to the offices of the Parliament." Iran's Al-Daawa and Reform Group, a Sunni group, condemned Tehran's attack saying that "this was a great and severe shock at the national level".

== International response ==
=== Supranational bodies ===
- United Nations: Secretary-General António Guterres and the United Nations Security Council separately offered their condolences to the Iranian Government and families of the people killed in the attacks. In a statement, Guterres spokesperson said that "the Secretary-General strongly condemns the terrorist attacks." Guterres called for those responsible for "this unjustifiable violence" to be brought to justice. "All countries must work together in fighting terrorism while upholding the universal rights and values that bind the global community," the spokesperson said. In a separate statement, the UN Security Council, which called the attacks "barbaric" and "cowardly," stressed the need to take measures to prevent and suppress the financing of terrorism, terrorist organizations and individual terrorists.
- European Union: Foreign Policy Chief Federica Mogherini condemned the terrorist attacks on Tehran and expressed sympathy and solidarity with the Islamic Republic of Iran. In a phone conversation with Iranian FM Javad Zarif, Mogherini denounced the heinous attacks on Tehran's Parliament and Ayatollah Khomeini's shrine. Earlier, she also had said, "we condemn terrorist attacks in Tehran today and will follow the incident carefully; today is a bitter day, as other times when a terrorist attack happens in the world; we condole Iran on the tragic incident." European Parliament President Antonio Tajani also said he "stands in solidarity with the President of Iranian Parliament and the Iranian people."

=== States ===
- Afghanistan: President Ashraf Ghani, Chief Executive Abdullah Abdullah, Head of the High Peace Council Mohammad Karim Khalili and former president Hamid Karzai expressed their deep grief over the deadly attacks, commiserating with the families of the victims.
- Algeria: Foreign Ministry condemned the attacks targeting the Iranian parliament building and the mausoleum of Imam Khomeini in Tehran, terming them "criminal acts." "Targeting human lives in this holy month Ramadan reaffirms the disrespect of the perpetrators of these abhorrent crimes for all religious, moral and humanitarian values. These attacks will not discourage the international community from working and coordinating together in order to confront terrorists and their destructive plans," Foreign Ministry spokesman Abdul Aziz bin Ali al-Sharif said in a statement.
- Armenia: Foreign Minister Edward Nalbandian strongly condemned the attacks. "We strictly condemn the attacks carried out on Iran’s parliament and Imam Khomeini's mausoleum. We express solidarity to the people of Iran," he said.
- Australia: Foreign Minister Julie Bishop condemned the raids and said, "We extend our deep condolences and sympathy for the victims and their families, and the Iranian people".
- Austria: Foreign Minister Sebastian Kurz was also among senior diplomats condemning the terrorist attacks in the Iranian capital. "I condemn today’s attacks in Tehran and express my condolences to the families and friends of the victims," he tweeted.
- Azerbaijan: President Ilham Aliyev extended his condolences to the Iranian nation and government, saying that the bloody incidents showed that "terrorism has turned out to be a growing menace for the entire world, and all its forms must be collectively and persistently addressed."
- Belarus: President of Belarus condemned the attacks in Tehran saying that "Belarus has had and will have solidarity with Iran and the international community in fighting the evil acts."
- Bolivia: President Evo Morales expressed his country's solidarity with Iran. "We condemn the violence that threatens life," he tweeted.
- Bosnia and Herzegovina: Bosnia and Herzegovina refrained from public condemnation of the attack. Few authorities, however, attended an iftar ceremony at the Iranian embassy in Sarajevo on Wednesday 8 June 2017 and expressed condolences to the victims of the incident.
- Brazil: Government expressed its sorrow at the incident, saying Brazil condemns any terrorist acts regardless of the motivation.
- Canada: Chrystia Freeland, Minister of Foreign Affairs in a press release stated that Canada strongly condemns the terrorist attacks in Iran and that "We grieve the deaths and the injuries sustained by many civilians and deplore the targeting of innocent Iranians. Our thoughts and sympathies are with the people of Iran". The Canadian minister also expressed that "the timing of these attacks, during the holy month of Ramadan, is an offence to the spirit of this sacred time. Canada remains unwavering in the global fight against terrorism and the hatred on which it is based."
- Chile: Foreign Ministry expressed condolences to the families of the victims and expressed solidarity with the Iranian nation and government. "Chilean government calls for close cooperation among the governments to counter terrorists in a bid to curb the global threat," said the statement.
- China Foreign Ministry Spokesperson Hua Chunying strongly condemned terrorist attacks in Tehran claiming lives of innocent people and injuring scores of others. Such measures are not acceptable for China and will be condemned under any circumstances, she said.
- Czech Republic: Foreign Ministry condemned Tehran terrorist attacks and expressed its deep concern over the new wave of violence in the fasting month of Ramadan in its Twitter account.
- Ecuador: In a statement issued by the Foreign Ministry, Lenin Moreno's government rejected and condemned "in the strongest terms" the terrorist attacks in parliament and in the Mausoleum of Imam Khomeini. Ecuador offered their heartfelt condolences to the government, the people of Iran and the families of the victims of this "detestable crime" and hoped for the prompt recovery of the wounded. In the same statement Ecuador called on the international community, "in the spirit of cooperation that the circumstances demand, work to eradicate this scourge of humanity, and the causes that originate it."
- Estonia: Estonian government condemned the attacks in Tehran.
- France: President Emmanuel Macron expressed condolences to Iran over deaths in Tehran terrorist attacks, stressing that Paris is open to closer cooperation with Tehran in the war against terrorism, said in a telephone call with his Iranian counterpart Hassan Rouhani. Rouhani also said that the Iranian administration is ready to work with the government of France and other European countries to decisively stand up to terrorism and fight against it. Foreign Ministry censured the deadly attacks in the Iranian capital. "We strongly condemn the attacks that targeted the Iranian parliament and the Imam Khomeini's mausoleum in Tehran," the ministry said in a statement.
- Georgia: President Giorgi Margvelashvili went to his Twitter to condemn "brutal Tehran attacks". Prime Minister Giorgi Kvirikashvili posted on Twitter that Georgia stands with the Iranian people. Country's Foreign Minister Mikheil Janelidze also expressed solidarity to the people and the government of Iran.
- Germany: Foreign Minister Sigmar Gabriel strongly denounced the terrorist attacks in the Iranian capital. "Once again, unscrupulous criminals have killed many innocent people", said Gabriel.
- Greece Foreign Ministry flatly denounced the terror attacks in the Iranian capital. "Athens condemns any act of terror carried out under any excuse. Concrete and practical measures must be adopted in order to tackle the menace of terrorism," the ministry said in a statement.
- India: External Affairs Minister Sushma Swaraj condemned terrorist attacks on institutions of democracy and spirituality in Tehran during a telephone conversation with Iranian Foreign Minister Mohammad Javad Zarif, the Indian ministry said in a statement.
- Indonesia: The Indonesian Ministry of Foreign Affairs issued an official statement condemning the attacks, noting that "we reaffirm that terror act is a crime that could not be justified, no matter what the motive, where, when, and by whom it is done". Minister of Foreign Affairs Retno Marsudi has also made a phone call to her Iranian counterpart to express condolences and the deepest sympathy to all the victims and their family.
- Iraq: President Fuad Masum censured the deadly terrorist attacks in Tehran. His message was published in Iraqi media and President Massoum underlined Iraqis' solidarity with Iranians in confrontation against terrorism. Massoum pointed out that attack was contradictory to all divine religions' thought and human morale. Already vice-Speaker of Iraqi parliament Homam Hamoudi, Head of National Coalition Ammar al-Hakim and Iraq Foreign Ministry have condemned Tehran terrorist attacks.
- Ireland: President Higgins sent a message to Iran’s president, Hassan Rouhani, expressing Ireland’s sympathy with those who died in the attack. "An attack on parliament must be unequivocally condemned by all those who believe in public discourse and the rights of parliament to improve the lives of citizens through peaceful, democratic means, not violence," he added in his statement.
- Japan: Prime Minister Shinzo Abe condemned the terrorist attacks on Tehran and sympathized with the Iranian people in a message to Iranian President Hassan Rouhani. He said that Japan condemns the violent attacks and extended his condolences to Iranians on behalf of the Japanese people and governments. Foreign Minister Fumio Kishida also sympathized with Iranians on the same occasion in a message to Iranian Foreign Minister Mohammad Javad Zarif.
- Jordan: Minister of State for Media Affairs Mohammad Momani said Jordan condemns terrorism that targets civilians and seeks to destabilize countries and communities.
- Kuwait: Foreign ministry issued a statement on Thursday to voice solidarity with the Iranian nation and government and strongly condemned terrorist attacks.
- Latvia: The Minister of Foreign Affairs of Latvia, Edgars Rinkēvičs, on behalf of Latvia, offered deepest condolences to Iran in relation to the attacks on the Iranian parliament and the Mausoleum of Ayatollah Khomeini in Tehran on 7 June 2017. Edgars Rinkēvičs expressed sympathy with the families and friends of the victims. The Minister emphasized that Latvia strongly condemns any acts of terrorism and violence.
- Lebanon: President Michael Aoun condemned the attacks, saying "they prove that terrorism has no religion, and that it strikes with no humane or religious restrictions whatsoever." The Lebanese President conveyed his condolences to the families of the victims and wished the injured speedy recovery. Parliament speaker Nabih Berri denounced the acts of terrorism as well, saying the attacks in Tehran will strengthen Iran's determination in the war against terrorism. Lebanon's Foreign Ministry also strongly condemned the dual terror attacks and urged the international community to unite to defeat terrorism.
- Lithuania: Foreign Ministry condemned the terrorist attacks in Tehran and offered condolences to the families and relatives of the victims of the attacks.
- Malaysia: Prime Ministry office published a statement and said that the government of Malaysia expresses its deep sympathy with the Iranian government and people and those affected by the incident and the fact that it happened in the Holy month of Ramadan makes is more sorrowful.
- Netherlands: Minister of Foreign Affairs Bert Koenders sympathized with the families of the victims in his Twitter message.
- Norway: The Norwegian Minister for Foreign Affairs Børge Brende condemned the "horrible" attacks in Tehran, sending his deepest condolences to the victims, their families and to all Iranians.
- Oman: Foreign Ministry censured the acts of terrorism, voicing Muscat's strong opposition to acts of terror and violence, which are meant to create insecurity and instability, shed the blood of innocent people and grip ordinary people by fear.
- Pakistan: Speaker of Pakistan National Assembly Sardar Ayaz Sadiq telephoned his Iranian counterpart Ali Larijani and condemned the terrorist attacks in Tehran. Senate chairman Raza Rabbani also strongly condemned attacks. Pakistan Peoples Party's leader Bilawal Bhutto Zardari, son of late leader Benazir Bhutto also condemned terrorist attacks on Iranian Parliament and the mausoleum of Imam Khomeini. In a press statement, the PPP Chairman said that these terrorist attacks were threats to peace in the entire region and expressed solidarity with the families of victims and the people of Iran.
- Qatar: Foreign Ministry strongly condemned Tehran terrorist attacks in a statement and declared that Doha opposes violence and criminal acts.
- Russia: President Vladimir Putin strongly denounced the terror attacks on Iran's parliament and the mausoleum of Imam Khomeini, the late founder of the Islamic Republic, vowing aid in the fight against international terrorism.
- Saudi Arabia: Foreign Minister Adel al-Jubeir said that his country condemns terrorist attacks no matter where they occur. "I do know who is behind the attacks in Tehran today, but there is no reason Saudi extremist elements are responsible for the attacks," he said.
- Syria: President Bashar al-Assad condemned the terrorist incidents and expressed solidarity with the Leader of the Islamic Revolution and the "brother" nation of the Islamic Republic of Iran.
- Tajikistan; President Emomali Rahmon cabled a message to his Iranian counterpart President Hassan Rouhani to condemn terrorist attacks in Tehran claiming lives of many civilians and injured scores of others. In the message, Tajik president expressed deepest condolences on the recent terrorist attacks in Tehran.
- Turkey: Deputy Prime Minister and government spokesman Numan Kurtulmus said the attacks proved that a watchful eye must be kept on possible terrorist moves in brotherly neighboring countries. "Terrorism knows no religion, method, race and sect, and is a besetting sin whoever the perpetrator is," Kurtulmus added. Turkish FM Mevlüt Çavuşoğlu wrote in a tweet, "I strongly condemn the terrorist attacks in Iran today (Wednesda [sic]). Turkey will keep its firm stance in fighting terrorism." Speaker of the Grand National Assembly İsmail Kahraman also published a statement and expressed his sorrow and condolences, and said these inhumane attacks once again showed that in fighting against terrorism, regional countries unconditional cooperation is absolutely necessary. Turkey's opposition Republican People's Party (CHP) also condemned the attacks and sympathized with the Iranians.
- Turkmenistan: President Gurbanguly Berdimuhamedow denounced the terrorist attacks in the Iranian capital on June 7 as an inhumane incident in a message to his Iranian counterpart Hassan Rouhani. Turkmenistan openly denounces any terrorist and extremist incident and supports global community's efforts to battle and eliminate the scourge of terrorism, the statement said.
- Ukraine: Foreign Ministry condemned June 7 terror attacks in Tehran in a statement, noting that the two targets selected by the terrorists indicated insolence of those behind the crimes. Ukraine Foreign Ministry also expressed condolences to the Iranian nation and government over the deadly attack and wished swift recovery for the injured.
- United Arab Emirates: President and Emir of Abu Dhabi Sheikh Khalifa bin Zayed Al Nahyan sent condolences to his Iranian counterpart following "the horrific crime". "His Highness Sheikh Khalifa expressed his sincere condolences to the Iranian people and the families of the victims, wishing the injured a speedy recovery," the message to President Hassan Rouhani said.
- United Kingdom: Foreign Secretary Boris Johnson, in a post published on his Twitter account said, "Our sympathies are with the people of Iran following the despicable terrorist attack. It is time for the world to unite against this scourge."
- Uzbekistan: President Shavkat Mirziyoyev cabled strongly condemned terrorist attacks in Tehran and said that such measures indicate that terrorism is continuing, but should be uprooted. He also extended condolences of Uzbek government and nation over the incident to the bereaved families of the victimes of the terrorist attacks as well as the Iranian nation.
- United States: President of the United States Donald Trump released a statement in which he prayed for the "innocent victims of terrorist attacks" and said that "states that sponsor terrorism risk falling victim to the evil they promote."
- Vatican: Pope Francis sent his condolences for the victims terrorist attack in Tehran, Iran, saying he "laments this senseless and grave act of violence". Along with his heartfelt condolences to all those affected by the barbaric attack in Tehran, the Pope commends the souls of the deceased to the mercy of the Almighty. He also assures the people of Iran of his prayers for peace.
- Venezuela: Ministry of foreign affairs announced that president Nicolás Maduro condemned ISL's terror attack on Tehran and sympathized with President Hassan Rouhani, Iranian government and people.
- Vietnam: Foreign Ministry Spokesperson Le Thi Thu Hang said Vietnam strongly condemn the attacks towards civilians and offer condolences to the state, government and people of Iran as well as families of the victims.

==== Others ====
- Gaza Strip-based Palestinian resistance movement Islamic Jihad said in a press statement that the criminal acts sought to target the Islamic Republic of Iran's role in supporting the anti-Israel resistance front and fight against terrorism. The movement also offered its condolences and expressed solidarity with the Iranian leadership, government and people.
- Iraqi Kurdistan: Regional Government Prime Minister Nechirvan Barzani released a statement expressing condolences to the government of Iran and the families of the victims and denounced the Islamic State attacks. "The Kurdistan Region is on the front lines of the fight against terror and we have bitter memories of terrorist attacks so we understand the pain well," Barzani said.
- Dina Esfandiary, who studies global security issues at the Center for Science and Security Studies at King's College said It is indeed a boost to ISIS morale, especially given that it's the first successful attack in Iran. Iran views its parliament, or Majlis, as a symbol of participatory government in contrast with its main regional rivals, including Saudi Arabia and allied sheikhdoms in the Persian Gulf. Last month, Iran's president, Hassan Rouhani won reelection in a race against hard-line challengers, said Washington Post.

=== ISIL ===
- Islamic State of Iraq and the Levant: Group's Amaq News Agency claimed that the group carried out the attacks. Amaq also released a 24-second video purportedly shot inside the complex, showing a bloody, lifeless body on the floor next to a desk. "Oh, Sunni people in Iran, don't you feel the pain from those shackles that are tied around your wrists and ankles?" one militant said in the video, calling on Sunnis to wage battle against Shiites in their "dens and gatherings" in Tehran and other Iranian cities.

== Other reactions ==
Social media users from around the world are sharing messages of solidarity with Iran after twin attacks in the Iran's capital. Many used the hashtags #prayforiran and #prayfortehran to show their solidarity, with some calling for the attacks to be met with equal condemnation to those perpetrated elsewhere. Iranians also used the term "Tehran Under Attack" to express their fear and shock on social media. "We stand united with Tehran, Kabul, London, Paris, and all!" was posted by many Twitter users.

The Eiffel Tower was turned out its lights shortly before midnight in tribute to the victims of the terror attack in Tehran. "Tonight, at 11.45pm, I will turn my lights off to pay tribute to the victims of the Tehran attack," said a tweet from an account representing the Eiffel Tower. Anne Hidalgo, the Mayor of Paris, wrote on Twitter that the French capital and its residents "stand in solidarity" with Iran.

== Funeral of victims ==
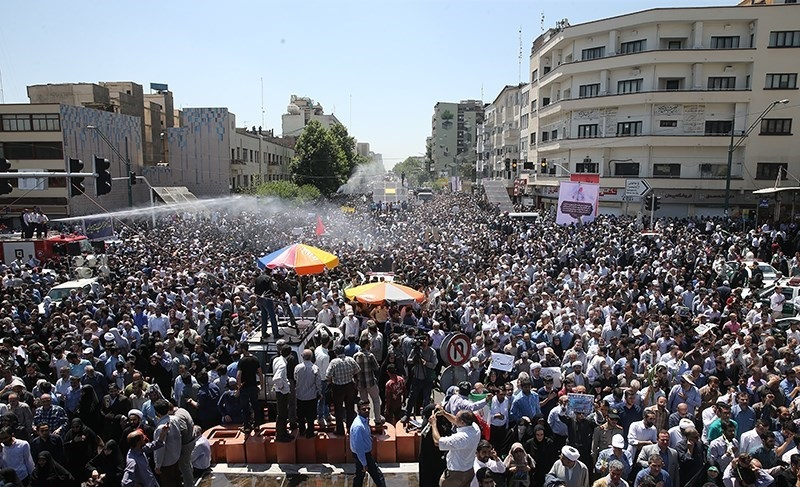
Funeral of victims at Enghelab Street

A state funeral held on 9 June 2017 at the Parliament's headquarters was attended by Iranian officials such as President Hassan Rouhani, Parliament Speaker Ali Larijani, and Chief Justice Sadeq Larijani. Other individuals joining the ceremony included government ministers and senior figures such as Ayatollah Mohammad Mohammadi-Golpayegani, the head of the office of Supreme Leader Ayatollah Ali Khamenei. Another funeral ceremony was held on Enghelab Street in Tehran.

== Military response ==
On 18 June 2017, under Operation Laylat al-Qadr, Iran's Islamic Revolution Guards Corps (IRGC) fired six surface-to-surface mid-range ballistic missile from domestic bases targeting ISIL forces in the Syrian Deir ez-Zor Governorate in response to the terrorist attacks in Tehran.
