= Eshraghi =

Eshraghi (Persian: اشراقی) is an Iranian surname. Notable people with the surname include:

- Naeimeh Eshraghi (born 1965), Iranian politician
- Zahra Eshraghi (born 1964), Iranian activist and former government official

== See also ==
- Khomeini family
