= Khomeyn (disambiguation) =

Khomeyn is a city in Markazi Province, Iran.

Khomeyn or Khumain (Persian: خمين) may also refer to:

- Khomajin, Famenin
- Khomeyn, Khuzestan
- Khommi, Razavi Khorasan
- Khomeyn County, in Markazi Province
