= Marzieh Hadidchi =

Iranian Islamist activist (1939–2016)

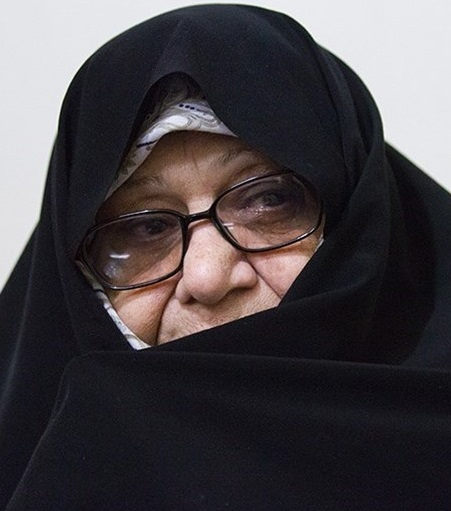

Member of the Parliament of Iran
- In office 3 May 1996 – 3 May 2000
- Constituency: Hamedan
- Majority: 216,015 (28.55%)
- In office 28 May 1984 – 28 May 1996
- Constituency: Tehran, Rey, Shemiranat and Eslamshahr
- Majority: 878,298 (47.40%)

Personal details
- Born: 12 June 1939 Hamedan, Iran
- Died: 17 November 2016 (aged 77) Tehran, Iran
- Resting place: Mausoleum of Ruhollah Khomeini
- Party: Association of the Women of the Islamic Republic
- Children: 8
- Profession: Politician, military commander
- Awards: Medal of Altruism (3rd Order)

Military service
- Allegiance: Iran
- Branch/service: Islamic Revolutionary Guard Corps
- Years of service: 1979–1984
- Commands: Hamedan Corps
- Battles/wars: 1979 Kurdish rebellion in Iran; Iran–Iraq War

Marzieh Hadidchi (Persian: مرضیه حدیدچی, 12 June 1939 – 17 November 2016), also known as Marzieh Dabbaq and Tahere Dabagh, was an Iranian Islamist activist, political prisoner, military commander in the Iran–Iraq War, a politician and representative of the city of Hamedan in the Iranian parliament in the second, third, fourth and fifth Majles. She was also one of the founders of the Islamic Revolutionary Guard Corps.

== Early activity ==
Hadidchi started her political activities with the Ayatollah Mohammad Reza Saidi circle. She was arrested by SAVAK in 1972 and severely tortured. SAVAK also arrested and tortured her 14-year-old daughter (Rezvaneh Mirza Dabagh).

Hadidchi escaped prison though Mohammad Montazeri's efforts and went to London with a fake passport. After 6 months' hiding in London, she moved to Lebanon, where she learned military tactics under the supervision of Mostafa Chamran. She also accompanied Ayatollah Khomeini during his exile in Paris.

== After revolution ==
After the revolution, she became the chief of the Islamic Revolutionary Guard Corps in Hamedan. She was one of the three messengers of Ayatollah Khomeini sent to the Soviet General Secretary Mikhail Gorbachev in 1989.

She has been the representative of the Parliament of Iran for three terms. She headed The Association of the Women of the Islamic Republic from 1987 until 2012. She died on 17 November 2016 at Tehran's Khatam Anbia Hospital after a long illness. She was buried on the following day in near Mausoleum of Khomeini in Behesht-e Zahra.
