= Ahmad Khomeini =

Iranian Islamic cleric and politician (1946–1995)

Seyyed Ahmad Khomeini
- احمد خمینی
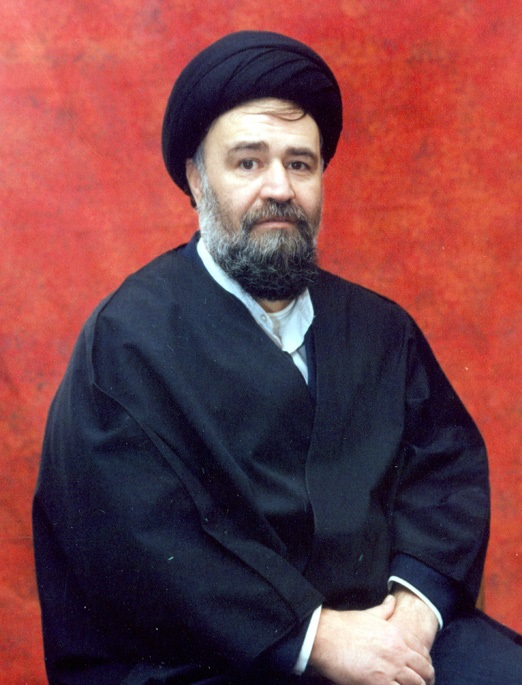
- Portrait of Ahmad Khomeini, c. 1995

Custodian of the Mausoleum of Ruhollah Khomeini
- In office 19 July 1989 – 17 March 1995
- Preceded by: Position established
- Succeeded by: Hassan Khomeini

Personal details
- Born: Ahmad Mostafavi Khomeini; 15 March 1946 Qom, Imperial State of Iran
- Died: 17 March 1995 (aged 49) Tehran, Iran
- Resting place: Mausoleum of Ruhollah Khomeini
- Party: Islamic Republican
- Spouse: Fatemeh Tabatabaei (m. 1969)
- Children: 3, including Hassan
- Parent(s): Ruhollah Khomeini; Khadijeh Saqafi
- Relatives: Khomeini family

Ahmad Mostafavi Khomeini (Note: Persian: احمد مصطفوی خمینی, romanized: Ahmad Khomeyni) (15 March 1946 – 17 March 1995) was an Iranian cleric and politician who was Custodian of the Mausoleum of Khomeini from 1989 until his death in 1995. A member of the Khomeini family and the second son of the first Iranian supreme leader Ruhollah Khomeini, Khomeini was the "right-hand" of his father before, during and after the Iranian Revolution, and also held key positions during his father's rule.

== Early life and education ==
Ahmad Mostafavi Khomeini was born in Qom on 15 March 1946 (although several sources have given his birth year as 1945), where he did his primary and secondary education in Owhadi and Hakin Nezami school, respectively and then started seminary studies and accomplished primary and secondary hawza courses. He secretly joined his father, Ruhollah Khomeini, after his father was exiled to Najaf.

== Career and activities ==
Ahmad was regarded as Khomeini's "right-hand man", the "torch-bearer for his father's anti-Western radicalism" and was close to his father, the leader of the Iranian Revolution of 1979. He helped coordinate affairs during and after the Iranian Revolution, in Khomeini's office in Najaf, Paris and subsequent to the ayatollah's return to Iran in February 1979. Ahmad participated in the trials of the Shah's army officers and politicians by the Islamic Revolutionary Court. In one case he said Nader Jahanbani, who had been deputy chief of the Imperial Air Force that he was a foreigner. Jahanbani replied: "No, all my ancestors were Iranians." Ahmad visited the deprived areas to learn their shortages and reported his findings to Imam Khomeini. His letters containing the issues he had encountered is available. He was among the officials went through Fatah training.

His political life career commenced after death of his brother, Mostafa. In the 6 years after the death of his father, he had several decision-making positions. He served as his father's chief of staff until his father's death in 1989. From the summer of 1988 to 1989, death of Khomeini, he was one of the decision-makers in all official issues along with Rafsanjani and Khamenei. He was a member of Iran's Supreme National Security Council without assuming any executive position. He was a member of Supreme Council of the Cultural Revolution by Ali Khamenei's official order. He became the overseer of the Mausoleum of Khomeini. He spoke against America, Israel and what he called "exploitative Iranian capitalists," on several occasions.

=== During hostage crisis ===
During the Iran hostage crisis, he had a "prominent role" and made "tough anti-American statements". According to the hostages, after Ahmad's visit to the then taken over embassy, he greeted the students and congratulated them for their action. Emphasizing on that some of the hostages were CIA agents based on the discovered documents, he repeated his father's threat "to put some of the captives on trial for spying" if the recently toppled Shah was "not returned to Iran."

=== During Iran-Iraq war ===
During the war, he had an important role reporting government general issues to his father and relaying the Imam's messages to officials and others. He also used to act as counsel for his father and other high-ranking officials.

=== Letter to Ayatollah Montazeri ===
On 29 April 1989, Ahmad Khomeini wrote a "more than three pages" letter addressing Ayatollah Montazeri saying that he was regretful for Montazeri's being heedless of "Imam's calls." Producing a list of accusations, Ahmad Khomeini tried to show that Montazeri's leadership would be harmful to the revolution. "Was it not because of your affection for Mehdi Hashemi that you created so many problems for Islam and the revolution?" said Ahmad Khomeini in a part of the letter. In response, Montazeri defended Mehdi Hashemi, an Iranian Shia cleric who was defrocked later, and said that he would "stay away from politics."

== Personal life ==
His wife was Fatemeh Soltani Tabatabai, daughter of Grand Ayatollah Mohammad Bagher Soltani Tabatabai Borujerdi, niece of Imam Musa Sadr, the Shia religious leader of Lebanon.

== Death ==
According to pro-government media, Ahmad Khomeini suffered a cardiac arrest on 12 March 1995, and went into a coma. He died five days later, on 17 March 1995, hours after being connected to life support machinery. Iran government announced two days of national mourning after Ahmad Khomeini's death. Ahmad Khomeini is entombed next to his father in a grand shrine south of Tehran, where his son, Hassan Khomeini, is the superintendent.

At least one author regarded his death as suspicious, stating that "he died in his sleep", without mentioning the heart attack five days prior and subsequent coma. According to Assembly of the Forces of Imam's Line, the Tehran Times reported that the rumors regarding Ahmad Khomeini's death was originally published by Alireza Nourizadeh, an alleged "British spy". Under duress, his son, Hassan Khomeini "confirmed" this, calling the rumors "baseless" and repeated the claim that they were created by a "British spy".

However, non-government sources claim that Ahmad Khomeini was indeed killed after falling foul of the supreme leader, Ayatollah Seyyed Ali Khamenei, and the then president, Hashemi Rafsanjani. On multiple occasions, Hassan Khomeini publicly claimed that his father was poisoned by the Iranian intelligence agents with the help of pills that his father had received at the hospital.

== Reception ==
Ahmad's father described him as:

"I bear witness that since the time my son Ahmad has entered the issues of the day, had contact with my works up to the present time I am writing these few lines, I have not experienced a single case of violation of my orders. In statements, communique and the like, he has not garbled or interfered in them without my satisfaction, nor has he attributed anything contrary to my words. In a word, I have not observed any offence from him."

Ayatollah Ali Khamenei, the former supreme leader of Iran, described him as someone who solved many problems and did many things throughout the revolution. Khamenei called him capable and a unique and necessary element besides Khomeini. According to Ayatollah Mohammad Fazel Lankarani, Ahmad was a strong column, a capable arm for the government, supreme leader and the officials.

== See also ==
- Maryam Khatun Molkara

== Notes ==
Political offices
New title	Supreme Leader's Representative at SNSC; 1989–1995; With: Hassan Rouhani	Vacant Title next held by Ali Larijani
