= 2017 Tehran attacks =

Series of terrorist attacks in Tehran, Iran

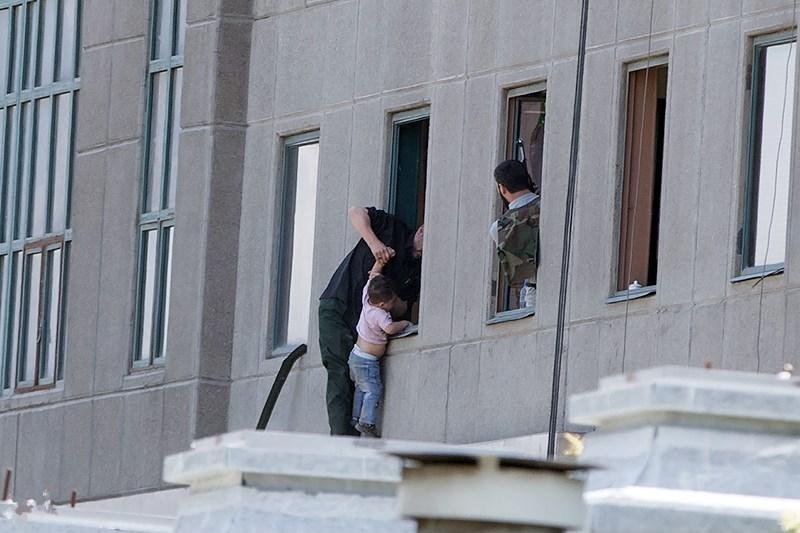

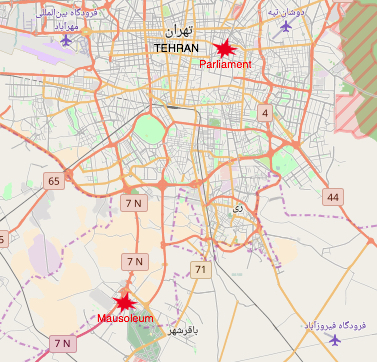
- Location: Islamic Consultative Assembly and Mausoleum of Ruhollah Khomeini, both in Tehran, Iran
- Date: 7 June 2017; 9 years ago 10:50–14:14 IRDT (UTC+04:30)
- Attack type: Suicide bombing, mass shooting, hostage-taking
- Deaths: 23 (18 victims, 5 attackers)
- Injuries: 52
- Perpetrator: Islamic State
- Assailants: Abu-Jahad, Serias Sadeqi, Ghayom Fatemi, Fereydoun, Ramin Ahmadi
- No. of participants: 5

A series of two simultaneous terrorist attacks were carried out on 7 June 2017 by five terrorists belonging to the Islamic State of Iraq and the Levant (ISIL) against the Iranian Parliament building and the Mausoleum of Ruhollah Khomeini, both in Tehran, Iran, leaving 17 civilians dead and 43 wounded. The shootings were the first terrorist attacks in Tehran in more than a decade, and the first major terror attack in the country since the 2010 Zahedan bombings.

Government officials later stated that they had foiled a third attack that day. Iranian security services stated on 8 June that they had identified the five militants responsible for the twin events, disclosing the men's first names, and detailed that they were of Kurdish Iranian background and had returned to Iran in August 2016. The terrorists reportedly served in a clandestine cell linked to Wahhabi-related networks. Some Iranian officials have accused the American, Israeli, and Saudi governments of being behind the attacks.

On 13 June, the Commander of Iran's Islamic Revolutionary Guard Corps (IRGC), Major General Mohammad Ali Jafari, stated that the terrorist attacks were carried out at the demand of Riyadh. "We have precise intelligence showing that unfortunately, Saudi Arabia, in addition to supporting the terrorists, has demanded them to conduct operations in Iran," he said.

The formal state funeral took place on 9 June in the context of traditional Friday prayers, and multiple Iranian officials attended such as President Hassan Rouhani, Parliament Speaker Ali Larijani, and Chief Justice Sadeq Larijani. Rouhani's speech stressed national unity, saying that "the nation will undoubtedly emerge victorious". On 10 June, security officials stated that they had killed the operational commander and mastermind behind the attacks.

On 18 June 2017, the IRGC launched a series of medium-range precision missiles at an ISIL headquarters in Dayr al-Zawr (Syria) from inside Iran. The retaliatory strikes were, according to an IRGC statement, sending a message to the terrorists and their networks of supporters after the bloodshed in Tehran.

== Background ==
The Iranian government had been battling the Islamic State of Iraq and the Levant (ISIL) for over three years with both military advisers and direct troops fighting the group's militants in both Iraq and Syria. ISIL, whose doctrine was based on the stringent Wahhabi segment of Sunni Islam, saw Shia Muslims, the largest Muslim population group in Iran, as apostates and enemies of Islam. Nonetheless, ISIL had yet to carry out any attacks within Iran despite repeatedly threatening the nation's people. In the months before the attack, ISIL increased its propaganda efforts in Persian to influence Iran's Sunni minority.

President of Iran Hassan Rouhani stressed greater rights for minorities, including Iranian Sunnis, and he made engagement efforts an element of his successful re-election campaign. However, areas such as the southeastern province of Sistan and Baluchistan have had persistent conflicts with Sunni extremist cells, including assassination attempts by the militants. On 8 June 2017, Iran's intelligence minister, Mahmoud Alavi, remarked that the government had broken up "a hundred terrorist plots" over the past two previous years alone.

On 3 May 2017, Saudi deputy crown prince, Mohammad bin Salman, accused Iran of aiming to wrest control over Islam's holiest site in Mecca and threatened action. Salman stated, "We won't wait for the battle to be in Saudi Arabia, instead, we will work so that the battle is for them in Iran, not in Saudi Arabia." The comments attracted condemnation from Iranians such as Minister of Foreign Affairs Javad Zarif.

== Parliament attack ==
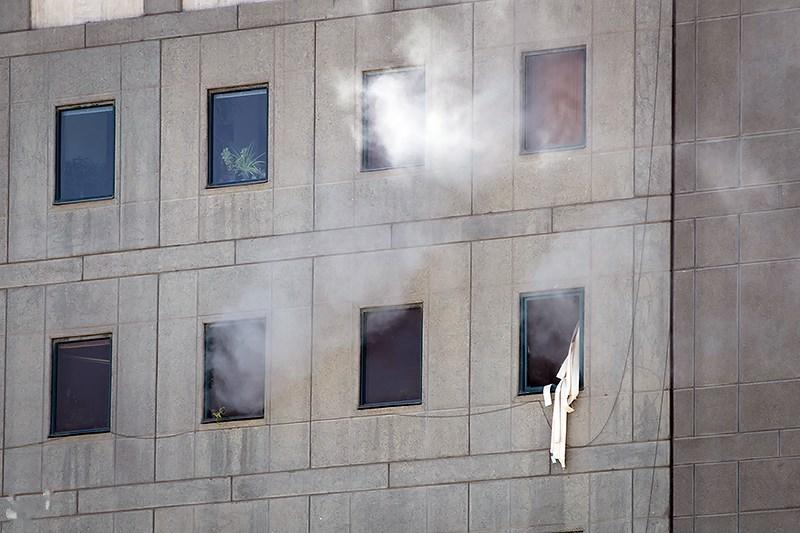
Shooting at parliament building

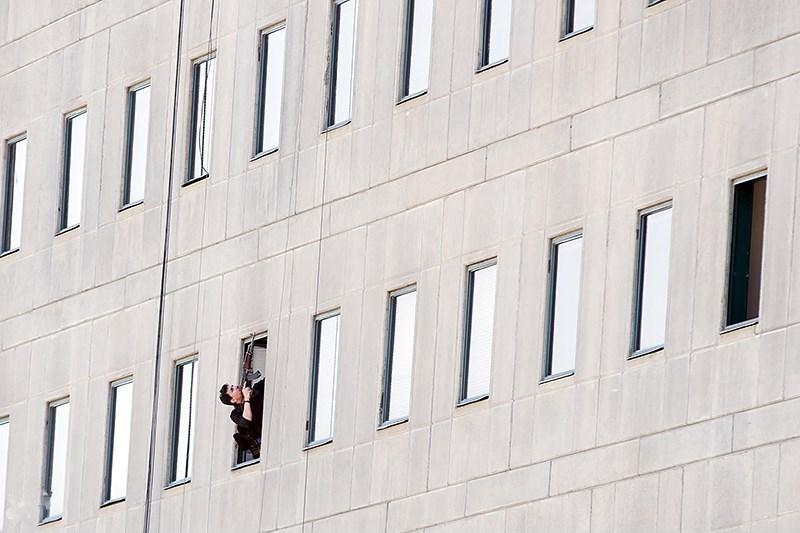
Security personnel targeting an attacker from the windows.

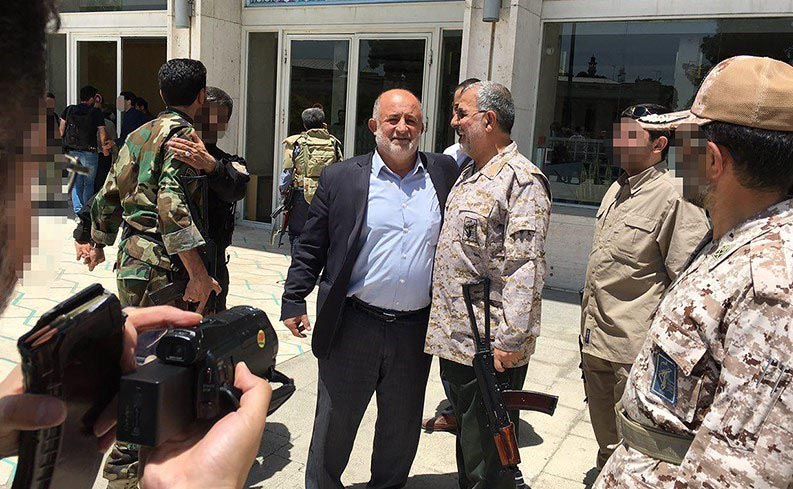
Brigadier general Mohammad Pakpour (center, holding a rifle), Commander of the IRGC Ground Forces, after security forces killed the attackers.

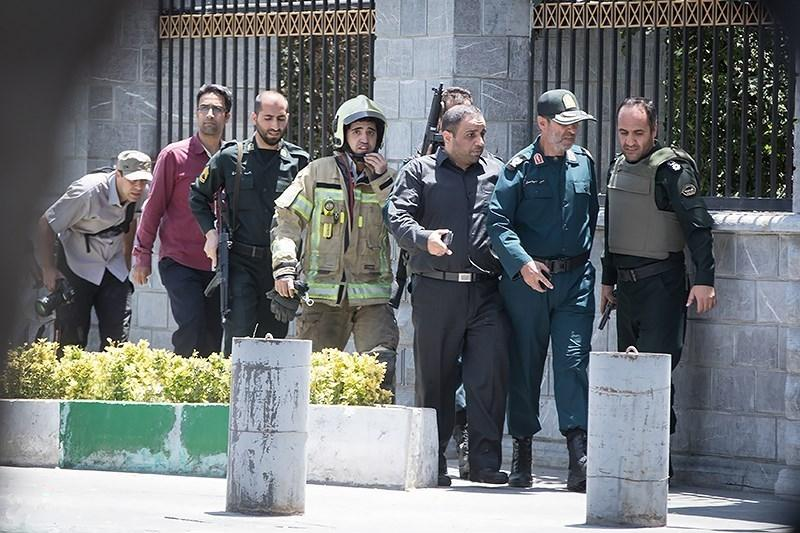
Police officers and a firefighter

According to a statement given by Hossein Zolfaghari, the Iranian deputy Minister of Interior, to the Islamic Republic of Iran Broadcasting, four militants entered the Parliament's administrative building disguised as women. Several of the gunmen opened fire, leaving seven to eight people injured. The militants were reported to have taken some people hostage, although the Iranian government denied this. The ISIL outlet Amaq News Agency released footage purportedly from a terrorist as he undertook the shooting, captured on the man's smartphone.

The building was subsequently surrounded by security forces. An Iranian member of parliament said that one of his staff was among the victims. Iranian state television reported that one of the attackers had blown himself up inside the parliament building while parliament was in session, while according to some other news agencies, the explosion could have been due to the grenades thrown by the attackers. Associated Press reported that journalists at the site had seen police snipers on nearby rooftops. Shops in the neighborhood were closed. Eyewitnesses said that the gunmen were shooting at people in the street from the fourth floor of the parliament building.

Iran's parliament continued meeting even as shooting erupted outside the main chamber. Ali Larijani, the speaker of the parliament, dismissed the attacks, saying they were a "trivial matter" and that security forces were dealing with them. Iranian MPs posted selfies from inside the parliamentary chamber in a show of defiance.

=== IRGC special forces operation ===
The Islamic Revolutionary Guard Corps (IRGC) special forces known as Saberin Unit entered the operation scene under the command of Brigadier General Mohammad Pakpour, Commander of the IRGC Ground Forces, and the snipers took up their positions. Minutes later, Major General Mohammad Ali Jafari, chief commander of IRGC, entered the scene accompanied by Brigadier General Hossein Salami, deputy commander of IRGC, Brigadier General Gholamhossein Gheybparvar, commander of Basij and Brigadier General Hossein Nejat, deputy chief of IRGC intelligence office.

A team of the special forces made their way to the upper floors of the parliament and killed one of the terrorists which made the two others begin shooting indiscriminately at people. This shooting revealed their position to the forces. Meanwhile, IRGC forces killed another terrorist before he detonated his suicide vest. The Iranian government later stated that four gunmen had been killed.

== Mausoleum attack ==
The attack on the Mausoleum of Ayatollah Khomeini took place at 10:30 am on 7 June 2017, and the fact that it occurred around the same time as the strike against the Iranian parliament immediately aroused suspicion that the two were coordinated as "twin attacks". According to The New York Times, the attacks lasted for several hours.

According to the administrator of mausoleum of Ayatollah Ruhollah Khomeini, the attack on the mausoleum left one person dead and three people injured. BBC reported that a suicide bomber detonated a bomb at the mausoleum. One female militant was captured alive. The counter-terrorism operation in the Ayatollah Khomeini's shrine was conducted by NAJA. According to NAJA, the attackers who attempted to enter the shrine were taken down by police snipers. One of the terrorists who was shot detonated himself, but the explosion did not harm any other people. Another terrorist started firing at both civilians and police forces; this resulted in one death and five individuals being injured, including a nearby policeman.

== Timeline of attacks ==
Parliament

- 11:09 – Four assailants dressed in women's clothing attack the Parliament's administrative building with AK-47 rifles and handguns.
- 12:56 – One of the assailants detonates his suicide bomb on the fourth floor of the Parliament.
- 13:00 – Assailants open fire at people gathered in the street through the fourth floor windows.
- 13:11 – The Parliament session is adjourned.
- 13:12 – Security forces clash with assailants in the western wing of the Parliament.
- 13:15 – Assailants run out of AK-47 rounds, switch to handguns.
- 13:39 – ISIL claims responsibility for the attacks.
- 13:42 – Lawmakers are evacuated.
- 14:14 – Security forces kill one of the assailants.
- 14:14 – Two other assailants are killed by the security forces.

Khomeini's Mausoleum

- 10:40 – Three assailants enter Khomeini's Mausoleum through its western ingress.
- 11:00 – Assailants clash with the security team in the mausoleum, three guards wounded.
- 11:13 – A suicide bomber blasts in the premises of the mausoleum. 35-year-old gardener killed, two others wounded.
- 11:20 – Another suicide bomber is shot before detonating.
- 11:25 – A female assailant is arrested.
Time is local (UTC+04:30)

== Responsibility ==
The Islamic State of Iraq and the Levant claimed responsibility for the attacks. This was the group's first attack in Iran. The Amaq News Agency, related to ISIL, released a 24-second video showing a lifeless body of a man, while a voice says in Arabic: "Do you think we will leave? We will remain, God willing." The attackers were reportedly under the leadership of a commander with the nom de guerre of Abu Aisha.

== Identity of the attackers ==
The Intelligence Ministry (VEVAK) released a statement on 8 June 2017 that detailed information on the five attackers and affiliated terrorist cells. It was announced that the full identities of the assailants had been determined after intelligence work by the Ministry, and only the militants' first names were released given that surnames had to be withheld due to certain social and security considerations. According to the Intelligence Ministry, the five individuals involved in carrying out the attacks had a history of past terrorist activities and links to groups with extremist, Wahhabi and Takfiri related beliefs. They were identified as Seriyas, Fereydoun, Qayyoum, Abu Jahad, and Ramin.

The statement said that the five had left Iran after being recruited by ISIL and had participated in the terrorist group's activities in the Iraqi city of Mosul and the Syrian city of Raqqah. It additionally said they had re-entered Iran in August 2016. Reportedly under the command of "Abu Ayesheh", a high-ranking commander within ISIL, they planned to carry out terror attacks in religious cities. However, the militants had reportedly fled the country following the destruction of their particular network and blows dealt to ISIL leadership.

Before the publication of the statement, Iranian Intelligence Minister Mahmoud Alavi had said that it was still soon to judge whether Saudi Arabia had had a role in the attacks in Tehran. "We witnessed heavy pressure from terrorists, to the extent that we have been identifying and arresting two-member and three-member teams or single individuals every week", said Alavi.

== Other allegations ==
Iranian government officials later stated that they thwarted a third attack, with a terrorist team arrested by security forces. Hassan Nasrallah, the Secretary General of Hezbollah, stated that the attacks were part of an "international, destructive plan" backed by various states in the region.

=== CISSM survey ===
On 11 to 17 June 2017, a poll was conducted by the Center for International and Security Studies (CISSM) at University of Maryland School of Public Policy & IranPoll. The study was based on 3 telephone surveys using probability sampling. Each survey interviewed about 1,000 Iranians. The survey indicated that more than half of the responders thought ISIL was the perpetrator behind the attacks.

== Iranian government response ==
Iranian authorities such as members of the Islamic Revolutionary Guard Corps and the Iranian Minister of Foreign Affairs (Javad Zarif) have accused Saudi Arabia of being behind the attacks. In a Twitter post, Zarif wrote, "Terror-sponsoring despots threaten to bring the fight to our homeland. Proxies attack what their masters despise most: the seat of democracy". His statements referred to the Saudi deputy crown prince Mohammad bin Salman's threats against the country about a month earlier, in which bin Salman asserted that "we will work so that the battle is for them in Iran". The People's Mujahedin of Iran (MEK) was also accused by Iranian authorities, accusations which the MEK denies.

On 9 June, the Lieutenant Commander of the Islamic Revolutionary Guards Corps (IRGC), Brigadier General Hossein Salami, argued that the attacks in Tehran were the outcome of a trilateral project with Americans, Israelis, and Saudis working together. Salami said that the terrorist strikes aimed at undermining Iran's political and security power after its enemies' back-to-back defeats in regional disputes and proxy warfare over the past years.

On 13 June, the main IRGC Commander, Major General Mohammad Ali Jafari, stated that the terrorists carried out their actions at the demand of Riyadh. He declared, "We have precise intelligence showing that unfortunately, Saudi Arabia in addition to supporting the terrorists, has demanded them to conduct operations in Iran."

Reza Seifollhai, the deputy head of Iran's Supreme National Security Council, stated that he believed the militants were native Iranians that the external group had recruited. Multiple witnesses who had heard the gunmen identified them as speaking Arabic with an Iranian accent, possibly revealing the terrorists as ethnic Arabs living in Iran. On 8 June, the government released photographs of five deceased assailants and disclosed their first names; additional information such as their surnames were held back for security purposes.

== Casualties ==
Seventeen individuals died at the hands of the ISIL attackers. The assailants fired upon both security personnel and nearby civilians alike. As well as those killed, fifty-two victims were injured.

Ahmad Shojaei, head of Iran's Medical jurisprudence, initially announced the incident death toll at 17, with three of the victims women. Six of the seven attackers were killed: four during the parliament shootings and two others at Khomeini's mausoleum. Three of the attackers blew themselves up in the parliament building and the mausoleum; the other three were shot by security forces and law enforcement. All casualties, including victims and attackers, were Iranian. One of the casualties was one of the MP's chief of staff; another was one of the visitors in his office. The video captured by ISIL was also broadcast at his office.

== Reactions ==
=== Domestic reactions ===
Ayatollah Ali Khamenei, Supreme Leader of Iran, downplayed the attacks by calling them mere "firecrackers" (Persian: ترقه بازی) which would not lead to the weakening of Iran's fight against terrorism. He said, "These firecrackers have no effect on Iran. They will soon be eliminated." The Ayatollah also stated that they "are too small to affect the will of the Iranian nation and its officials".

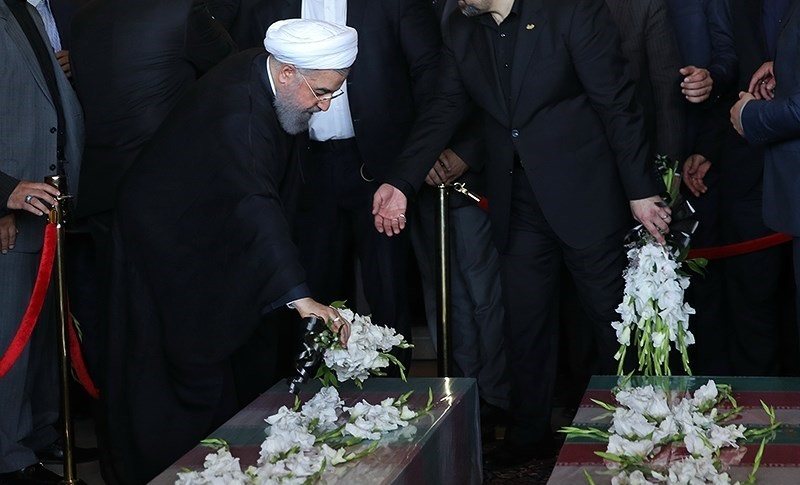
President Hassan Rouhani provides a tribute to the victims during the 9 June 2017 funeral.

Iranian government officials expressed sympathies for the victims and condemned the attack. President Hassan Rouhani said the attack would make Iran more united in the war against terrorism. "We will prove once again that we will crush the enemies' plots with more unity and more strength," Rouhani said. He also called for regional and international cooperation and unity. First Vice President Eshaq Jahangiri also stated that the government would promote the organized fight against radical terrorism. Iranian Minister of Foreign Affairs Javad Zarif condemned the terrorist attack in Tehran saying, "terrorism is a problem that we face in the Middle East and the whole world".

Iranian parliament speaker Ali Larijani said in his closing statements that the attack was a "minor issue." Two days later while addressing a funeral ceremony for the victims of the attack, Larijani underlined that terrorists tried to undermine the democratic and religious foundations of the nation, but they failed to do so. It further stated that "The United States has aligned itself with the ISIL in the region," claiming that US is behind most of the terrorist acts in the world and that US has demonstrated that it is "the international ISIL."

Tehran Mayor Mohammad Bagher Ghalibaf tweeted "Martyrdom of our dear citizens in a terrorist attack have created deep scars on our hearts." 2017 presidential defeated candidate Ebrahim Raisi also condemned the attacks and said that the attacks showed ISIL's peak helplessness and humiliation.

Major General Mohsen Rezaee of the Revolutionary Guards wrote in an Instagram post that Iran was sure to "severely punish the terrorists who have murdered hundreds, not only in Iran but also in the U.K., Germany, France, Afghanistan, and Pakistan." Iran's Revolutionary Guards also released a statement saying Saudi Arabia was behind the attack. Supreme National Security Council Secretary Ali Shamkhani also stated that authorities had apprehended several people suspected of planning bomb attacks. He noted that the arrests were made over the last few days and added that the attacks were planned for the holy month of Ramadan.

Iranian Sunni leader and Zahedan Friday Prayers Imam Molavi Abdul Hamid condemned the attacks. Blasting the militants' "sinister goals", he remarked, "Blind terrorists martyred fasting people who were referred to the offices of the Parliament."

In a statement that condemned the ISIS attacks, People's Mujahedin of Iran leader Maryam Rajavi reminded that, "ISIS's conduct clearly benefits the Iranian regime's Supreme Leader Khamenei, who wholeheartedly welcomes it as an opportunity to overcome his regime's regional and international impasse and isolation. The founder and the number one state sponsor of terror is thus trying to switch the place of murderer and the victim and portray the central banker of terrorism as a victim."

=== International reactions ===
Official condolences were expressed by the governments of various countries and international bodies. (Note: Including Afghanistan, Algeria, Armenia, Australia, Austria, Azerbaijan, Brazil, Canada, China, Czech Republic, Estonia, France, Georgia, Germany, India, Indonesia, Iraq, Ireland, Italy, Japan, Jordan, Latvia, Lebanon, Lithuania, Malaysia, Netherlands, Norway, Oman, Pakistan, Qatar, Russia, Singapore, Sweden, Syria, Tajikistan, Turkey, the United Arab Emirates, the United Kingdom, and Vietnam.) United Nations Secretary-General António Guterres condemned the attacks while expressing sympathies for the government of Iran and the families of the victims, and Guterres wished for a quick recovery to all those injured. The United Nations Security Council observed a minute's silence in the aftermath of the attack. Federica Mogherini, European Union Foreign Policy Chief, condemned the attacks and voiced sympathy and solidarity with Iran in a phone-call with Mohammad Javad Zarif, the Iranian Minister of Foreign Affairs. Many around the world also posted #PrayforTehran on social media in solidarity after the attacks.

United States Senators Bernie Sanders and Dianne Feinstein called on the Senate to delay a vote on imposing sanctions on Iran. However, no delay took place and the measures went through shortly. Iranian Parliament Speaker Ali Larijani condemned the sanctions' imposition and remarked that the U.S. government had acted "shamelessly."

President of the United States Donald Trump released a statement in which he prayed for the "innocent victims of terrorist attacks" and said that "states that sponsor terrorism risk falling victim to the evil they promote." Iranian Foreign Minister Mohammad Javad Zarif rejected Trump's statement, calling it "repugnant." Richard N. Haass, the president of the Council on Foreign Relations, also criticized Trump's statement. Haass argued on Twitter that "[c]ondemnation of terrorism cannot be selective if it is to have meaning" and "must condemn it in Tehran as well as in Europe" as well as that the "statement on Iran terror, which after condolences says Iran deserved it, is [the] result of divided staff drafting [without] smart clear guidance". Reza Marashi, research director of the National Iranian American Council, called Trump's statement "a vile response to grieving Iranians" and asked what would happen if Iranians claimed that the U.S. deserved the 9/11 attacks. He also pointed out that Iranians held candlelight vigils for 9/11 victims and an entire soccer stadium of Iranians observed a moment of silence as well.

In a further statement to clarify his position, Rohrabacher stated that he "oppose the use of force against unarmed civilians no matter who is the victim or who is doing the killing" but he is also against "Iran's vicious Mullah monarchy" and "when it comes to Sunni terrorists or Shiite terrorists, I prefer them to target each other rather than any other victims, especially innocent civilians and Americans." Also added that it will "require support for those proud Iranians who want to win their freedom and heritage from Mullahs and are willing to fight for it. That does not include Isis, but it may include a lot of Iranians who see blowing up Khomeini's mausoleum as an expression of freedom from the yolk [sic] of Islamic terror."

Following the events, multiple Iranian officials as well as organizations such as the Islamic Revolutionary Guard Corps suggested that Saudi Arabia was responsible. Adel al-Jubeir, the Foreign Affairs Minister of Saudi Arabia, denied his country's involvement in the attacks and said Riyadh had no knowledge of who had committed them. While stating that his administration is unwilling reestablish normal diplomatic ties with Iran, he additionally condemned the terrorist attacks and "the killing of the innocent anywhere it occurs." Supreme Leader Ayatollah Ali Khamenei remarked in a 9 June message that the attacks had spread hatred towards the Saudi government, which he labeled one of the "stooges" of the U.S.

== Aftermath ==
=== Funeral and farewells ===
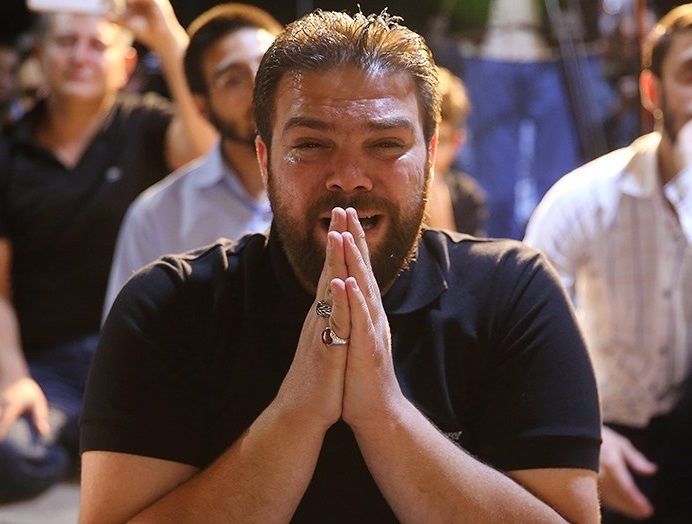
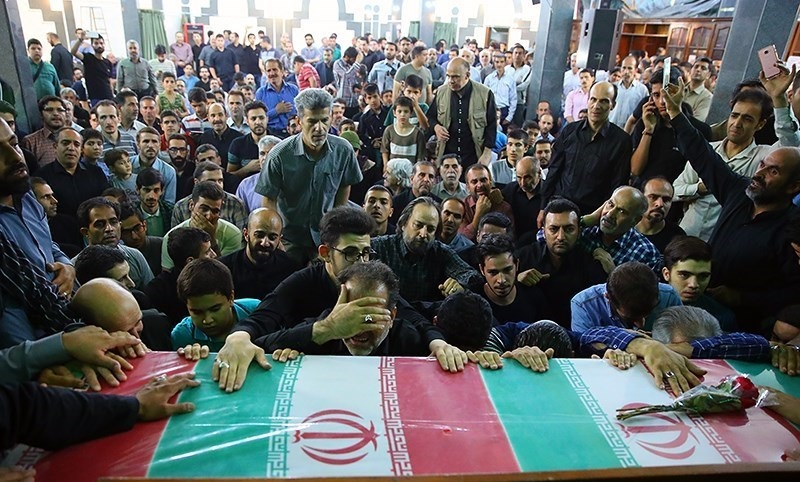
Mourners grieve at the 9 June 2017 farewell ceremony before coffins of victims wrapped in the flags of Iran.

A state funeral held on 9 June 2017 at the Parliament's headquarters was attended by Iranian officials such as President Hassan Rouhani, Parliament Speaker Ali Larijani, and Chief Justice Sadeq Larijani. Other individuals joining the ceremony included government ministers and senior figures such as Ayatollah Mohammad Mohammadi-Golpayegani, the head of the formal office of Supreme Leader Ayatollah Khamenei. Several foreign ambassadors came as well. The survivors of the Tehran attacks who attended held up pictures of the victims.

In a written message to the ceremony, Ayatollah Khamenei stressed that the attacks "will not damage our nation's determination to fight terrorism". He stated as well that the events "will only increase hatred for the governments of the United States and their stooges in the region like Saudi Arabia." During the funeral processions, many individuals in the massive crowds chanted slogans against both the American and Saudi governments, blaming them for the violence.

Addressing the ceremony, the Parliament Speaker said, "Today is a hard day for the Iranian nation. Farewell to dear ones, who were sadly martyred". He remarked that the "terrorists fell short of their aim" yet still managed to blindly target civilians and mere state employees before the attacks ended. President Rouhani's speech stressed national unity, with the leader saying that "the nation will undoubtedly emerge victorious".

=== Arrests of terrorist suspects ===
After the success of Iranian intelligence operations, including the cooperation of some of the families of the terrorists, forty-one ISIL militants were identified and arrested on 9 June 2017. They were taken in across the country, including in Kermanshah, Kurdistan, and West Azarbaijan as well as within Tehran itself. Upon arresting the terrorists, Iranian authorities found weapons, bomb materials, explosive belts, communications equipment, and forged documents. While reporting these positive results, officials emphasized as well that efforts against ISIL networks must continue outside of Iran's borders.

On 10 June, Tehran police had a particular breakthrough in discovering the car that the terrorists had used. Iranian security forces announced that day that their intelligence efforts succeeded in finding and killing the mastermind and main commander behind the attacks. As well, seven individuals in southern Larestan County were taken in that day for suspected ties to the ISIL organization.

=== Military response ===
On 18 June 2017, the IRGC announced that a series of medium-range ground-to-ground missiles were launched at ISIL group headquarters in the Syrian city of Dayr al-Zawr, the missiles being fired from Iran's western provinces of Kermanshah and Kurdistan. Striking in response to the terrorist attacks in Tehran, the IRGC stated that their strikes resulted in the death of a significant number of extremists as well as the destruction of a large number of weapons, ammunition, and equipment belonging to them. The Iranian government semi-officially released a video of the actual military launch. Afterward, the Iranian Ambassador to the United Kingdom, Hamid Baeidinejad, declared that the strikes "manifested the will and capacity of Iran to fight against terrorism and security threats."

In a public statement related to the strikes, published by its Public Relations Office, the IRGC cautioned that the missile strikes were just a warning to deter any further action by the terrorists. It specifically read that the "IRGC warns the Takfiri terrorists and their regional and trans-regional supporters that they would be engulfed by its revolutionary wrath and flames of the fire of its revenge in case they repeat any such devilish and dirty move in future." Some Iranian sources suggested that the IRGC chose Dayr al-Zawr given that the city had begun to serve as the primary center of assembly, command, and logistics for ISIL militants lately where the terrorists had moved ground after defeats in Aleppo and Mosul over the previous months.

While Iranian forces have undertaken multiple efforts against ISIL in the past, these were the first admitted strikes launched from Iranian soil. The missiles reportedly traveled about six-hundred kilometers until they reached the targeted city. The same day as the launch, Ayatollah Khamenei held meetings with the families of Iranian personnel fighting inside both Iraq and Syria, the leader giving a speech stressing the need for continued action outside of Iran's borders.

The day after the strike, the IRGC released official footage depicting moments in which the missiles successfully hit their targets. The videos were transmitted by drones that the IRGC flew from Damascus over Dayr al-Zour. IRGC spokesman Brigadier General Ramezan Sharif said, "Fortunately, all incoming reports and images of drones which were monitoring the operation suggest that the six medium-range powerful Iranian missiles have precisely hit the targets, the key bases of terrorists in the general area of Dayr al-Zawr inside Syria." As well, Amir Ali Hajizadeh, the commander of the IRGC's Aerospace Force, stated the videos showed them that "the missiles precisely hit their targets."

== See also ==
- 2017 in Iran
- Iran and ISIL
- List of terrorist incidents in June 2017
- List of terrorist incidents linked to ISIL
- List of attacks on legislatures
