= Hussein Khomeini =

Iranian scholar and reformist cleric (born 1958–1959)

Hojat ol-eslam Sayyid Hussein Khomeini (Persian: سید حسین خمینی; born 1958–1959) is an Iranian scholar and reformist cleric. He is the grandson of Grand Ayatollah Ruhollah Khomeini, the son of Ruhollah's first son, Mostafa Khomeini, and his wife, Masoumeh Haeri Yazdi, daughter of Morteza Haeri Yazdi.

== Views ==
Unlike his grandfather, Khomeini is a liberal secularist and an outspoken critic of the theocratic Islamist government in Iran. Khomeini has denounced the Iranian government as the "dictatorship of clerics". In 2003, he declared Iran's reformist movement "finished", questioned the theocratic principle of velayat-e faqih, and "called for a referendum to decide how the country should be governed in the future." He has also advocated for a nonclassical interpretation of Islamic law applied in the country.

His mentor is thought to be Grand Ayatollah Hossein-Ali Montazeri. However, Montazeri was against the invasion of Iraq and called for withdrawal of American troops from Iraq. In strong contrast to his grandfather's politics, Khomeini is a cleric who has spoken out against the Islamic Republic system. He is sympathetic to American neoconservatives, and has lectured at the American Enterprise Institute.

== Arrest ==
Hossein Khomeini was arrested in 1981 for saying "the new dictatorship established in religious form is worse than that of the Shah and the Mongols." He was then placed "under virtual house arrest."

=== Trips outside Iran ===
After the 2003 American-led invasion of Iraq, Hossein relocated to the holy city of Karbala. During the same year he visited United States and, in a historic meeting, was received by Crown Prince Reza Pahlavi, son of the last Shah of Iran.

After his quick visit to America, he returned to Iraq for several months, then suddenly departed for his native Iran after receiving an urgent message from his grandmother, asking him to come back. According to Michael Ledeen, who has quoted "family sources," he was blackmailed into returning. During a stay in Washington, he met with famed author and antitheist Christopher Hitchens, according to whom he received Hitchens' Quran, kissed it and added to it the references he considered canonical in disapproving of the Islamic republic's legitimacy. He also met Hitchens in Qom in 2005. In Christopher Hitchens Arguably, page 455, their meeting is described in “Iran’s Waiting Game” which features in (page 466) “Vanity Fair, July 2005.” In his memoir, Hitch-22, Hitchens praised Khomeini as a "courageous foe of his grandfather's theocracy".

=== Call for overthrow of the Islamic Republic ===
In 2006, he broke "a three-year silence" when he called for American destruction of the Islamic Republic by invasion on the Al-Arabiya television station, saying 'freedom must come to Iran in any possible way, whether through internal or external developments. If you were a prisoner, what would you do? I want someone to break the prison [open]'. This position was even more extreme than that of the fiercely anti-regime Iranian exiles, "who oppose military action while urging the US to back a domestic uprising."

Since returning to Iran, he has been closely monitored by the Iranian government and has been restricted in granting interviews to the Western media, but is thought to "be protected from retribution by his grandmother, Khadijeh Saqafi" (d. 2009).
