= Khomeyn =

City in Markazi province, Iran

Khomeyn خمين
- City
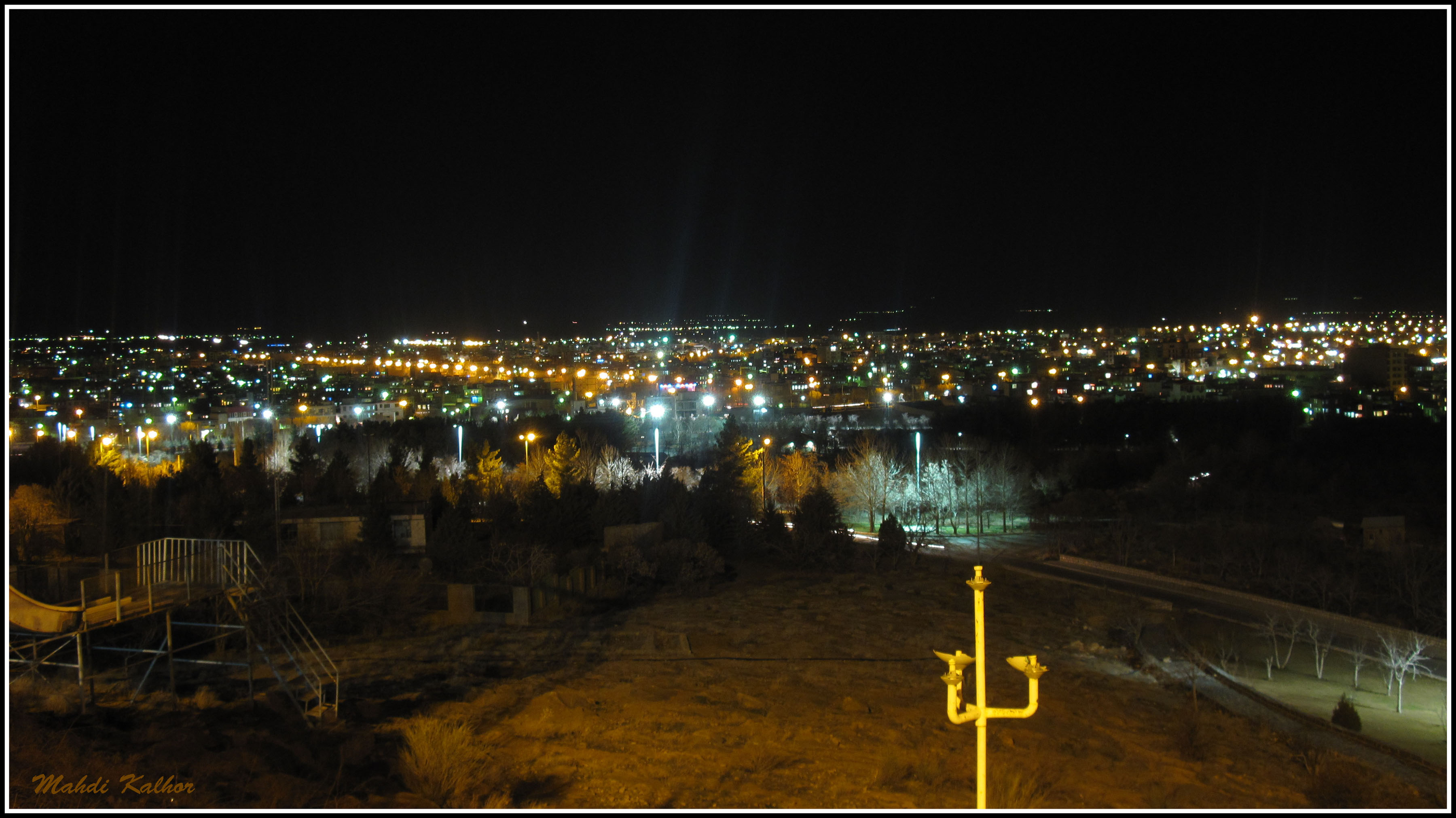
- The city of Khomeyn at night

- Location within Iran
- Coordinates: 33°38′32″N 50°04′44″E
- Country: Iran
- Province: Markazi
- County: Khomeyn
- District: Central

Population (2016)
  - Total: 72,882
- Time zone: UTC+3:30 (IRST)
- Website: khomein.ir

Khomeyn (Iranian Persian: خمين) (Note: Also known as Khowmeyn, Khomein, Khumain and Khumayn) is a city in the Central District of Khomeyn County, Markazi province, Iran, serving as capital of both the county and the district.

== History ==
The name of Khomein was first mentioned in a book named The History of Prophets and Kings. Subterranean canals (qanats), sewers and its famous fire-temple can be named as some pre-Islamic relics. This town was called the center of Kamareh 200 years ago.

=== Khomeini house ===
A family house in Khomeyn was the birthplace of former supreme leader Ayatollah Ruhollah Khomeini, the founder of the Islamic Republic of Iran. The house became a historical monument and museum.

The house was set on fire on 17 November 2022 during the Mahsa Amini protests; and days after the death of Kian Pirfalak, an Iranian child killed during the attack on Izeh market. Online social media showed a crowd cheering as flames were seen emerging from the house. Tasnim News Agency denied that a fire had occurred and stated that the house was "open to the public".

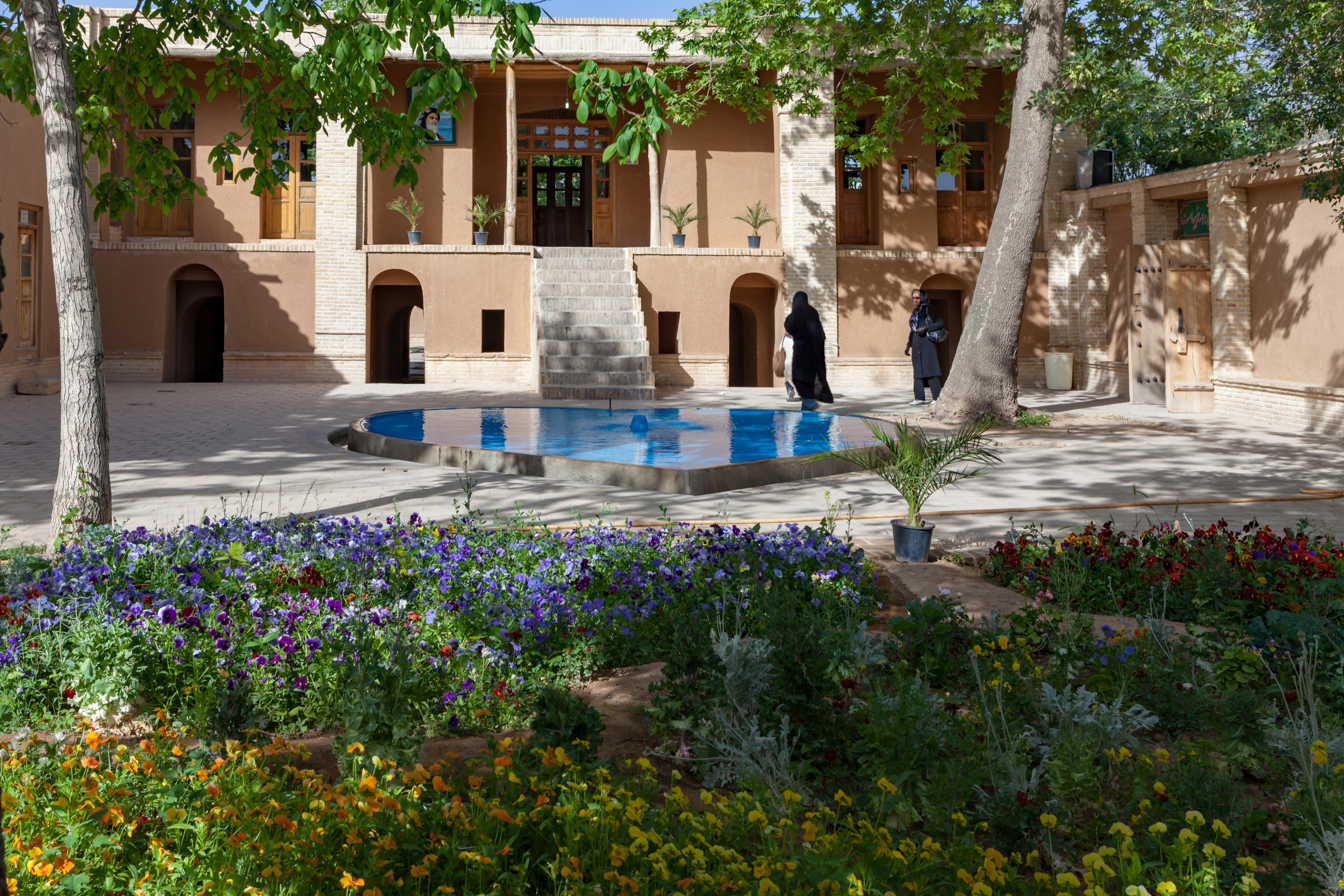
The birthplace of Ruhollah Khomeini in Khomeyn.

== Demographics ==
=== Population ===
At the time of the 2006 National Census, the city's population was 64,031 in 17,399 households. The following census in 2011 counted 70,053 people in 21,477 households. The 2016 census measured the population of the city as 72,882 people in 23,334 households.

== Geography ==
=== Location ===
Khomeyn is in the south of the province, in a fertile plain, about 160 kilometres (99 mi) from Qom and 325 kilometres (202 mi) from Tehran.

=== Climate ===
The climate of Khomeyn is a moderate mountainous inclining to a semi-desert one. Winters are cold and summers are moderate.

== See also ==
- Khomeini (surname)
- Ruhollah Khomeini
- Hussein Khomeini
