= Naeimeh Eshraghi =

Iranian politician

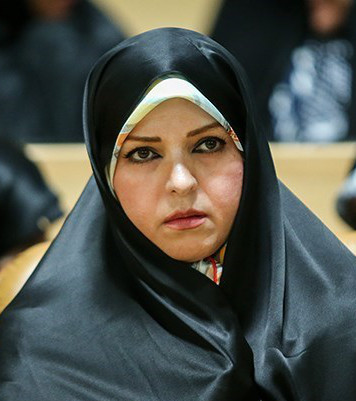
Naeimeh Eshraghi

Naeimeh Eshraghi (Persian: نعیمه اشراقی) (born 1965) is an Iranian politician who is from the family of Ayatollah Khomeini.

Naeimeh Eshraghi was born to Shahab-al-din Eshraghi and Sedigheh Khomeini and is the granddaughter of Ayatollah Khomeini. She studied for a Bachelor of Science in Petrochemical engineering and a master's degree in industrial engineering at Amirkabir University of Technology. She has been on the board of the Kish oil engineering company. She has been married to Seyyed Mohammad Hassan Taheri, the son of Ayatollah Taheri Esfahani.

== Controversies ==
In 2013, Eshraghi made headlines again when she posted a joke on her Facebook in which she said that she often joked with Ayatollah Khomeini that "Pasdaran (revolutionary guards) should marry widows of the martyrs, and Khomeini wished that he was a Pasdar himself". This comment made angry responses from the families of Iran–Iraq War veterans. The son of Mohammad Ebrahim Hemmat wrote a harsh letter condemning her. She later said that her Facebook page was hacked. The Iranian parliament later issued a statement saying that her comments will be investigated. She later closed down her Facebook page because of the mounting criticism.
