= Morteza Haeri Yazdi =

Iranian Ayatollah (1916–1986)

- مرتضی حائری یزدی
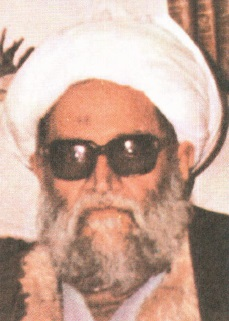
- Ayatollah Morteza Haeri Yazdi's portrait in 1979 for Assembly of constitution.

Personal life
- Born: 12 October 1916 Arak, Sublime State of Persia
- Died: 16 March 1986 (aged 69) Qom, Iran
- Parent: Abdul-Karim Haeri Yazdi (father)
- Education: Qom Hawza
- Relatives: Mehdi Haeri Yazdi (brother)

Religious life
- Religion: Islam
- Jurisprudence: Twelver Shia Islam

Muslim leader
- Teacher: Ruhollah Khomeini, Hossein Borujerdi, Mohammad-Reza Golpaygani
- Students: Mohammad Momen, Mohammad Reyshahri

Morteza Haeri Yazdi (Persian: مرتضی حائری یزدی; 12 October 1916 – 16 March 1986) was an Iranian cleric and Twelver Shia scholar. He was the son of Iranian Shia scholar Abdul-Karim Haeri Yazdi, and was one of the students of Ruhollah Khomeini, the former supreme leader of Iran.

His daughter Masoumeh Haeri Yazdi was married to Khomeini's eldest son, Mostafa Khomeini.

== Education ==
He attended seminary in Qom, and was educated by professors such as Mohammad-Reza Golpaygani, Mohammad Taqi Khansari and Seyyed Mohammad Mohaghegh Damad. Abdul-Karim Haeri Yazdi died in 1937.

== Death ==
Morteza Haeri Yazdi died on the night of 16 March 1986, in Qom and was buried in the shrine of Fātimah bint Mūsā.

== Professors ==
- Mohammad-Reza Golpaygani
- Mohammad Taqi Khansari
- Seyyed Mohammad Mohaghegh Damad
- Khalil Kamareyi
- Seyyed Hossein Borujerdi
- Ruhollah Khomeini

== Students ==
- Seyyed Ali Milani
- Mohammad Mehdi Rabbani Amlashi
- Mohammad Reyshahri
- Mohammad Momen

== See also ==
- List of ayatollahs
