= Khadijeh Saqafi =

Islamic revolutionary and Ruhollah Khomeini's wife (1913–2009)

- خدیجه ثقفی
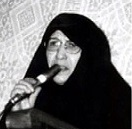
- Saqafi in 1987

Spouse of the Supreme Leader of Iran
- In role 3 December 1979 – 3 June 1989
- Supreme Leader: Ruhollah Khomeini
- Succeeded by: Mansoureh Khojasteh Bagherzadeh

Personal details
- Born: 1915 or 1916 Tehran, Qajar Iran
- Died: 21 March 2009 (aged 92–94) Tehran, Iran
- Resting place: Mausoleum of Ruhollah Khomeini
- Spouse: Ruhollah Khomeini (m. 1929 or 1930)
- Children: 7, including: Mostafa; Zahra; Farideh; Ahmad

Khadijeh Saqafi (Persian: خدیجه ثقفی; 1915 or 1916 – 21 March 2009) was an Iranian revolutionary and the wife of Ruhollah Khomeini, the first Supreme Leader of Iran and figurehead of the Iranian Revolution.

== Early life ==
Saqafi was born in 1915 or 1916 in Tehran, the daughter of Hajj Mirza Mohammad Thaqafi-e Tehrani, a respected cleric and merchant.

== Marriage and later years ==
At the age of 16, Saqafi married 29-year-old Ruhollah Khomeini in 1929 or 1930. They had seven children together, although only five survived childhood. The family resided in Qom until Khomeini's exile in 1964. Their son Mostafa died in Iraq in 1977 while in exile, while their second son Ahmad died of cardiac arrest in 1995.

Throughout their marriage, Saqafi largely stayed out of the public eye, although she was described as being a strong supporter of her husband's opposition to the Shah, Mohammad Reza Pahlavi. Akbar Hashemi Rafsanjani, former President of Iran, referred to Saqafi as the "closest and most patient" supporter of her husband.

== Death ==
Saqafi died in Tehran on 21 March 2009 aged between 92 and 94, following a long illness. Thousands attended her funeral at the University of Tehran, including then-Supreme Leader Ali Khamenei and then-President Mahmoud Ahmadinejad. Saqafi was buried next to her husband and son at his mausoleum in Behesht-e Zahra.

Honorary titles
First New title	Spouse of the Supreme Leader of Iran; 1979–1989	Succeeded by Mansoureh Khojasteh Bagherzadeh as wife of Ali Khamenei
