= Mostafa Khomeini =

Iranian cleric (1930–1977)

- مصطفی خمینی
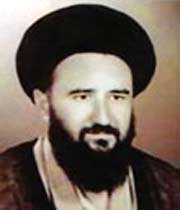
- Khomeini in the 1970s
- Born: 12 December 1930; Qom, Imperial State of Iran
- Died: 23 October 1977 (aged 46); Najaf, Ba'athist Iraq
- Resting place: Najaf
- Education: Qom Theological Center
- Spouse: Masoumeh Haeri Yazdi (m. 1956)
- Children: 3, including Hussein
- Parents: Ruhollah Khomeini; Khadijeh Saqafi

Sayyid Mostafa Khomeini (Persian: سید مصطفی خمینی; 12 December 1930 – 23 October 1977) was an Iranian cleric and the eldest son of Ruhollah Khomeini. He died before the Iranian Revolution.

== Early life and education ==
Khomeini was born in Qom on 12 December 1930. He was the eldest son of Ayatollah Khomeini and Khadijeh Saqafi, daughter of a respected cleric, Hajj Mirza Tehrani.

He graduated from the Qom Theological Center.

== Activities ==
Mostafa Khomeini participated in his father's movement. He was arrested and imprisoned after the 1963 events and also, after his father's exile. On 3 January 1965, he joined his father in Bursa, Turkey, where he was in exile. Then he lived with his family in Najaf, Iraq, from October 1965. There he had contacts with the Iraqi Shia activist Hassan Shirazi. Mostafa and his brother Ahmad became part of Khomeini's underground movement. The group also included Mohammad Beheshti and Morteza Motahhari. In 1970 Khomeini asked Hassan Shirazi, who had been released from prison, to go to Lebanon to find individual and institutional supporters. Shirazi carried out this activity in Lebanon until 1974.

== Personal life and death ==
Khomeini married Masoumeh Haeri Yazdi (died 2023), a daughter of Morteza Haeri Yazdi. Khomeini died of a heart attack in Najaf on 23 October 1977. His father, Ruhollah Khomeini, did not attend the funeral, due to grief. He was buried in Najaf within the shrine of Ali ibn Abi Talib.

His death has been regarded as suspicious by both the followers of Ayatollah Khomeini and common people of Iran due to various reports that SAVAK agents were present at the scene. Hence, his death was attributed to SAVAK. His father later described Mostafa's death as a "martyrdom" and one of the "hidden favours" of God, since it fueled the growing discontent with the Shah and finally produced the Iranian Revolution, just slightly more than one year after Mostafa's death. By contrast, Morteza Haeri Yazdi, who was close to the Khomeini family, attributed Mostafa's death to natural causes. Memorial services for Mostafa Khomeini were organized in different cities of Iran which became nationwide protests against the Pahlavi rule.

== Ideas and writings ==
Like his father, Khomeini was trained in the tradition of Transcendent Theosophy and is described by some scholars as having developed original contributions to Islamic philosophy. According to secondary studies, he is said to have articulated a number of philosophical ideas in a large work titled al-Qawāʿid al-ḥakamiyyah, which is believed to be lost. His philosophical views have instead been reconstructed through an examination of his extant writings, including works on theology and metaphysics. Scholarly analyses attribute to him approximately fifty distinct philosophical ideas, many of which address topics traditionally shared by theology and philosophy, such as existence and quiddity, mental existence, the division of being, motion, substance and accident, ontology, and causality. These studies situate his thought in dialogue with earlier Islamic philosophers, particularly Mullā Ṣadrā.
