= Hassan Khomeini =

Iranian cleric (born 1972)

Ayatollah; Seyyed; Hassan Khomeini
- حسن خمينی
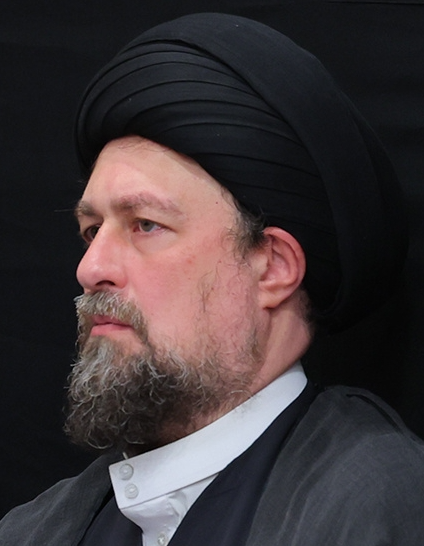
- Khomeini in 2025

Custodian of the Mausoleum of Ruhollah Khomeini
- Incumbent
- Assumed office 17 March 1995
- Preceded by: Ahmad Khomeini

Personal details
- Born: Hassan Mostafavi Khomeini; 23 July 1972 (age 54) Qom, Iran
- Spouse: Neda Bojnourdi
- Children: 4
- Parents: Ahmad Khomeini; Fatemeh Tabatabai
- Relatives: Khomeini family
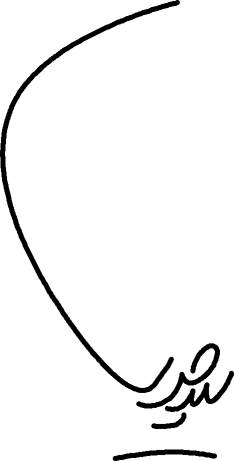
- Signature
- Website: hasankhomeini.ir

Personal life
- Main interest(s): Jurisprudence; Principles of jurisprudence Philosophy

Religious life
- Religion: Islam
- Denomination: Twelver Shiʿa
- Jurisprudence: Ja'fari
- Creed: Usuli

Muslim leader
- Teacher: Kazem Mousavi-Bojnourdi; Hossein Wahid Khorasani; Mohammad Fazel Lankarani; Mousa Shubairi Zanjani; Abdollah Javadi Amoli

Hassan Mostafavi Khomeini (Note: Persian: حسن مصطفوی خمینی) (born 23 July 1972) is an Iranian politician and cleric who has served as the custodian of the Mausoleum of Khomeini since 1995. A member of the Khomeini family, he is the grandson of the first Iranian supreme leader Ruhollah Khomeini.

According to The New York Times, Hassan Khomeini was one of the potential and likely candidates in the 2026 supreme leader election following Ali Khamenei's assassination. However, Khamenei's son, Mojtaba Khamenei was elected his father's successor. Khomeini has held relatively moderate and reformist views in contrast to the hardline principalist views held by his grandfather. As such, he has been at odds with the Iranian clerical establishment, especially the Guardian Council, and sidelined from mainstream politics.

== Biography ==
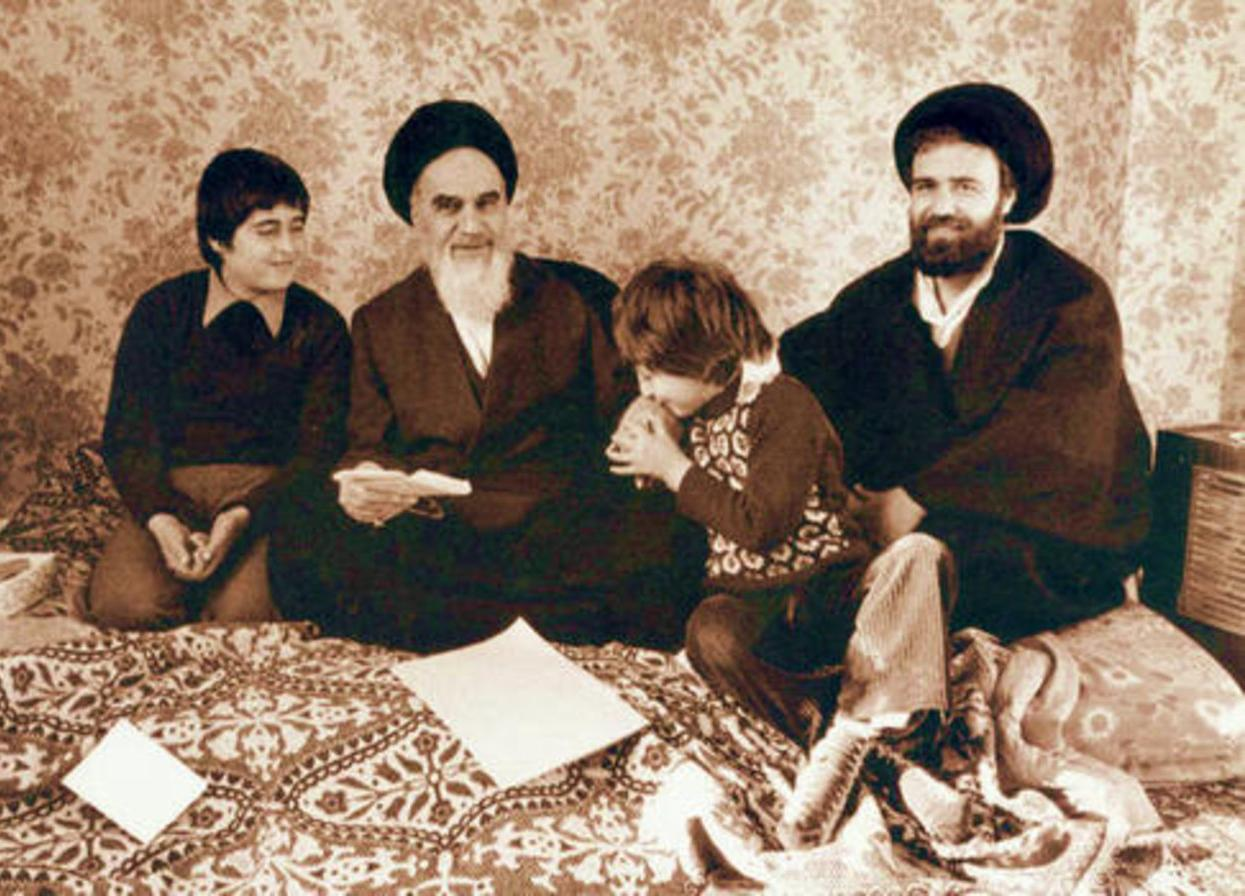
Hassan Khomeini between his grandfather Ruhollah and father Ahmad. His cousin Ali Eshraghi is on the left side

He spent his childhood alternately in Qom and Najaf, with his maternal grandfather, Muhammad Baqir Sultani Tabatabai, and his paternal grandfather, Ruhollah Khomeini, the founder of the Islamic Republic of Iran. He is the son of Ahmad Khomeini and Fatemeh Tabatabai.

He is married to Neda Bojnourdi, daughter of Mohammad Mousavi Bojnourdi, and has four children.

== Career ==
After his seminary studies from 1989-1993, Hassan Khomeini became a cleric.

In 1995, following the death of Ahmad Khomeini, he was appointed custodian of the Mausoleum of Khomeini where his grandfather and father are buried. He has had official meetings with officials such as Syrian President Bashar al-Assad and Hezbollah Secretary-General Hassan Nasrallah. He also taught in the holy city of Qom, and has published his first book on Islamic sects.

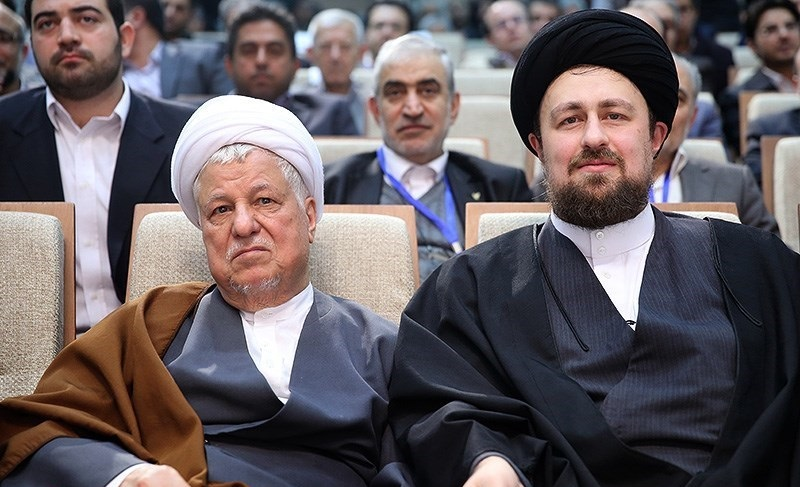
Hassan Khomeini with Akbar Hashemi Rafsanjani

He has been described as having "expressed frustration with some policies of a regime dominated by fundamentalists", such as former President Mahmoud Ahmadinejad. In an interview in February 2008, Khomeini spoke out against military interference in politics. Soon after, in what some observers believe may have been retaliation, an article in a publication tied to President Ahmadinejad accused him of corruption, "claiming that he drove a BMW, backed rich politicians and was indifferent to the suffering of the poor". This was "the first time in the history of the Islamic Republic" that one of Khomeini's offspring was "publicly insulted", according to the Iranian daily newspaper Kargozaran. Khomeini met with reformers before the 2009 election and met with defeated presidential candidate Mir-Hossein Mousavi and "supported his call to cancel the election results".

On 9 December 2015, he announced that he would enter politics and run for the Assembly of Experts in the 2016 election. His nomination was rejected by the Guardian Council on 10 February 2016.

In June 2020, Iranian media speculated that he would be a presidential candidate in the 2021 election, although he declined to stand on the advice of Supreme Leader Ali Khamenei.

In 2021, he criticized the Guardian Council for barring reformists from running.

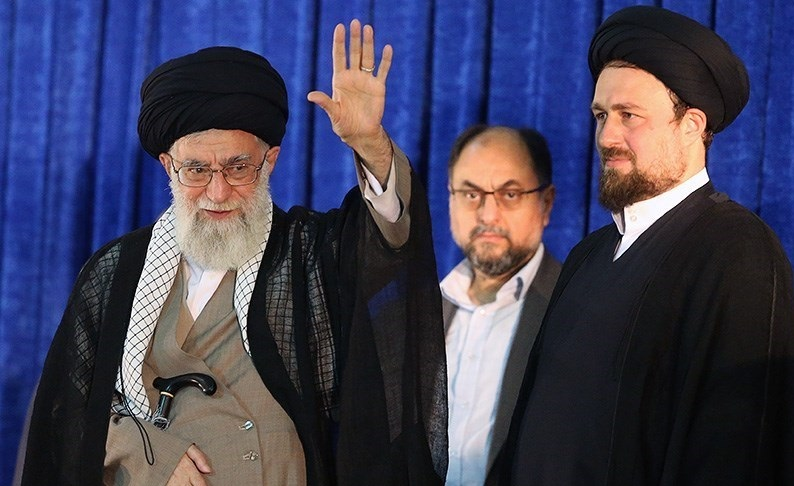
Ayatollah Ali Khamenei and Hassan Khomeini at 27th anniversary of Ruhollah Khomeini's death

On 31 May 2023, a journalist was assaulted by Hassan Khomeini's bodyguards while trying to photograph him alongside Mohammad Khatami. The incident happened in the headquarters of Ettela'at in Tehran, during an event marking the first anniversary of the death of the institute’s director Mahmoud Doaei. The bodyguards punched, kicked, and insulted the journalist, while Khomeini's security chief examined his phone. The Iranian Labour News Agency condemned the bodyguards for attacking journalism. After the incident became viral, Khomeini apologized to the journalist.

Hassan Khomeini criticized Donald Trump for disregarding human rights concerns, warning the people against a potential fall of the theocratic regime in January 2026, attributing the unrest to "ISIS-like terrorism" during the protests while praising Ayatollah Khamenei's courage and wisdom in handling the "engineered" instability hostile countries allegedly sought to cause.

== 2026 Supreme Leader election ==
After the assassination of Ali Khamenei, a transitional council was established during the 2026 Iran war until the Assembly of Experts named a new Supreme Leader. Hassan Khomeini was one of the clerics designated as a potential successor, along with Mojtaba Khamenei (who was ultimately selected), Alireza Arafi, Mahdi Mirbaqiri, and Hasan Amili.
