= Mausoleum of Ruhollah Khomeini =

Shi'ite tomb and memorial in Tehran, Iran

- آرامگاه سید روح‌الله خمینی
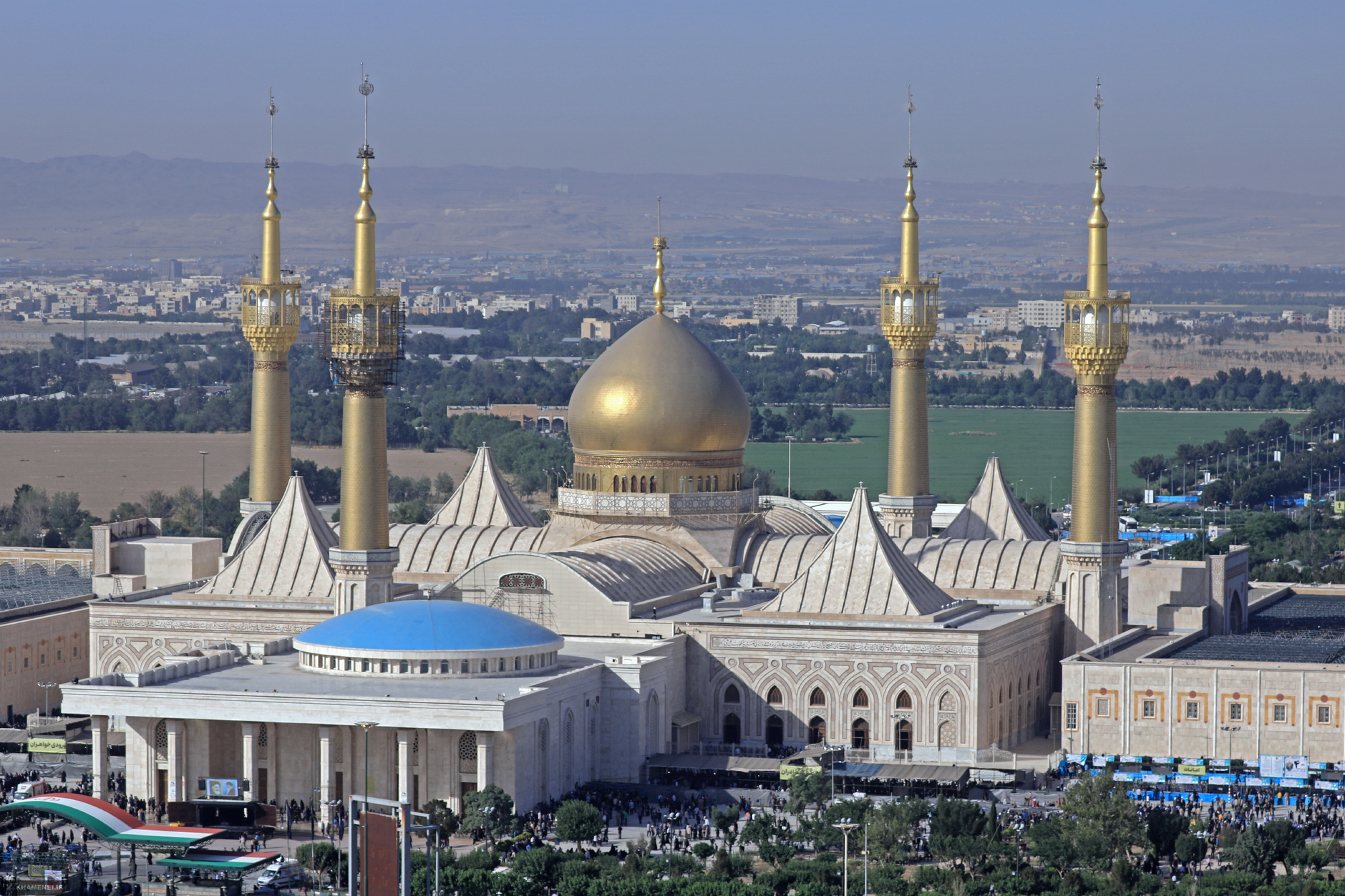
- The mausoleum complex in June 2023

- Location of the tomb in Tehran

Religion
- Affiliation: Shia Islam
- Ecclesiastical or organisational status: Mausoleum; Cultural and tourist center; Madrasa; Shopping mall; Carpark; Islamic museum
- Status: Active
- Dedicated in honor of: Ruhollah Khomeini

Location
- Location: Behesht-e Zahra cemetery, Tehran, Tehran province
- Country: Iran
- Interactive map of Mausoleum of Ruhollah Khomeini
- Coordinates: 35°32′57″N 51°21′59″E

Architecture
- Architect: Parviz Moayyed
- Type: Islamic architecture
- Funded by: Government of Iran
- Groundbreaking: 19 July 1989
- Completed: 2025
- Construction cost: c.US$2 bn

Specifications
- Dome: One
- Minaret: Four
- Minaret height: 91 m (299 ft)
- Site area: 2,000 ha (4,900 acres)
- Shrine: Many
- Materials: Concrete; marble

Website
- astaan.ir (in Persian)

The Mausoleum of Ruhollah Khomeini (Persian: آرامگاه سید روح‌الله خمینی), also known as the Holy Shrine, or the Haram Motahhar, is a Shi'ite Islamic mausoleum that houses the tombs of Ayatollah Ruhollah Khomeini, his wife Khadijeh Saqafi, and his second son Ahmad Khomeini; and some political figures, such as former President Akbar Hashemi Rafsanjani, former Vice President Hassan Habibi, Lieutenant General Ali Sayad Shirazi, Iranian Revolution figure Sadeq Tabatabaei, and MP Marzieh Hadidchi. The mausoleum is located to the south of Tehran in the Behesht-e Zahra (Paradise of Zahra) cemetery.

The mausoleum is the centerpiece in a funerary complex spread over 2,000 hectares (4,900 acres), that houses the tombs, a cultural and tourist center, a university for Islamic studies, a seminary, a shopping mall, a 20,000-car park, and a branch of the National Museum of Iran. Construction commenced in 1989 following Khomeini's death on 3 June of that year, took over 35 years to complete, and the Iranian government reportedly devoted US$2 billion to the development. In May 2025 it was announced that the official commemoration will be held on 4 June 2025.

The site is a place of pilgrimage for followers of Khomeini. It is used symbolically by government figures, and is on occasion visited by foreign dignitaries. Every year, Khomeini's death anniversary is marked on 4 June at the mausoleum in a ceremony that is attended by governmental officials, foreign ambassadors, and others. Khomeini's grandson, Seyyed Hassan Khomeini, is in charge of caring for the mausoleum.

== Architecture ==
The tomb was designed by Mohammed Tehrani. The exterior of the shrine complex is a highly recognizable landmark. It has a gold dome sitting on a high drum, surrounded by four free-standing minarets that are 91 metres (299 ft) high. The shrine is surrounded by a large rectangular plaza which has been designed to hold vast numbers of visitors. With its size, inclusion of a qibla wall and a maqsura, the tomb resembles a mosque, but has been called an Hussainia.

Non-Muslims are allowed inside the complex.

== Incidents ==
On 20 June 2009, a suicide bomb attack occurred near the site of the mausoleum, in which the attacker was killed and three pilgrims were injured.

On 7 June 2017, the mausoleum was attacked by three gunmen while a suicide bomber detonated a bomb at the mausoleum. One female militant attacker was captured. Government officials later claimed to have thwarted a third attack. One person died and five people were injured. Others attacked the parliament building at the same time.

== Gallery ==
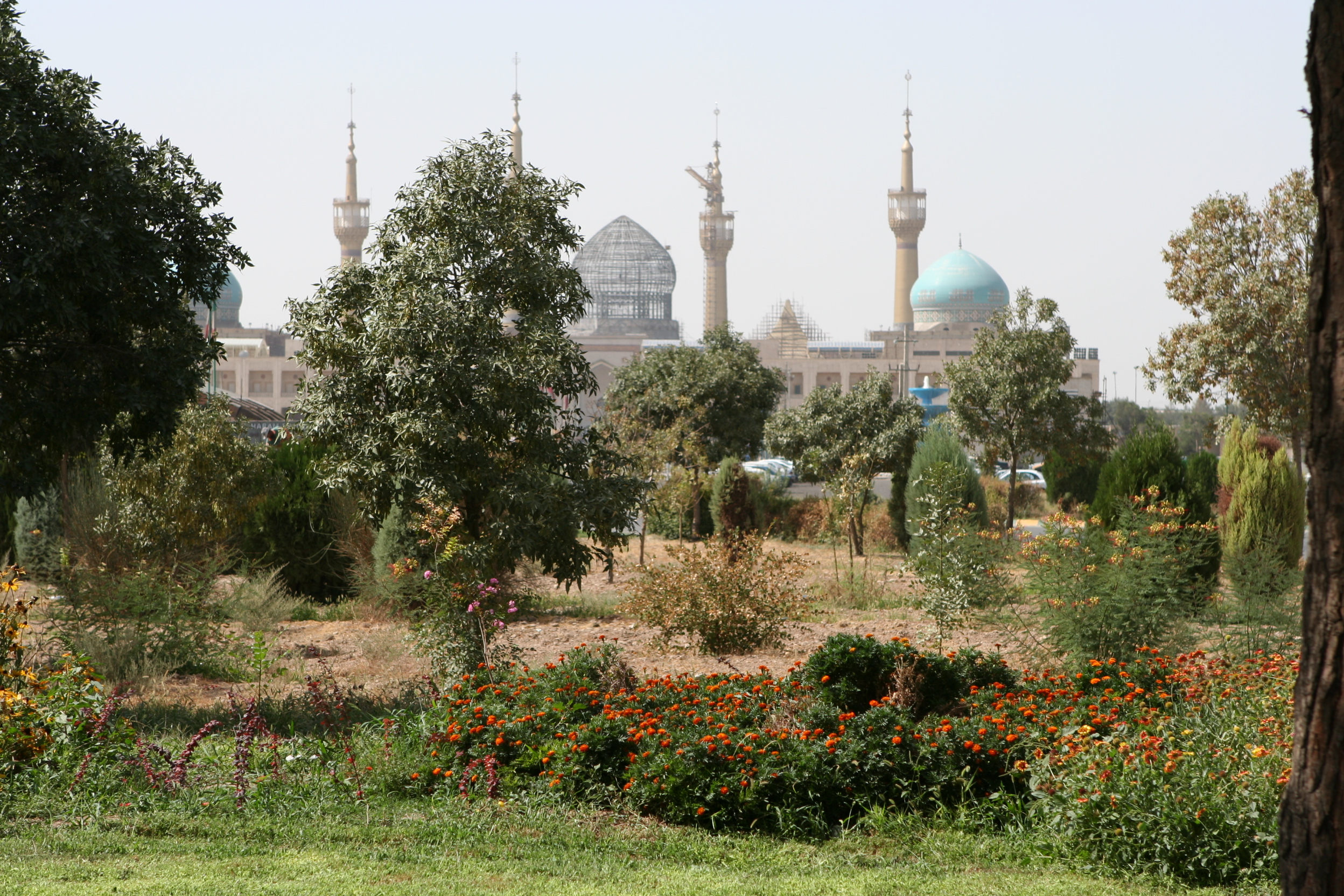

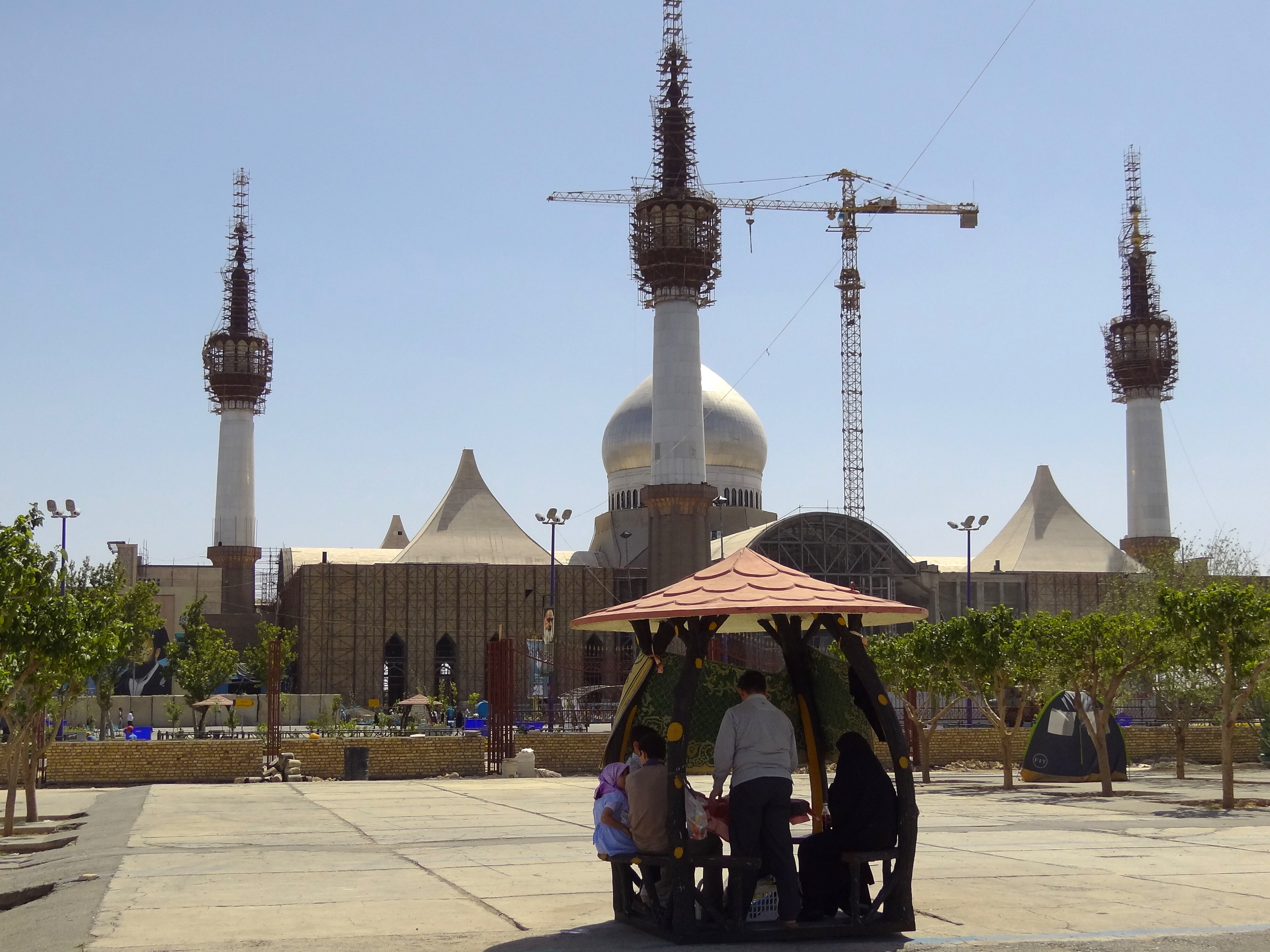

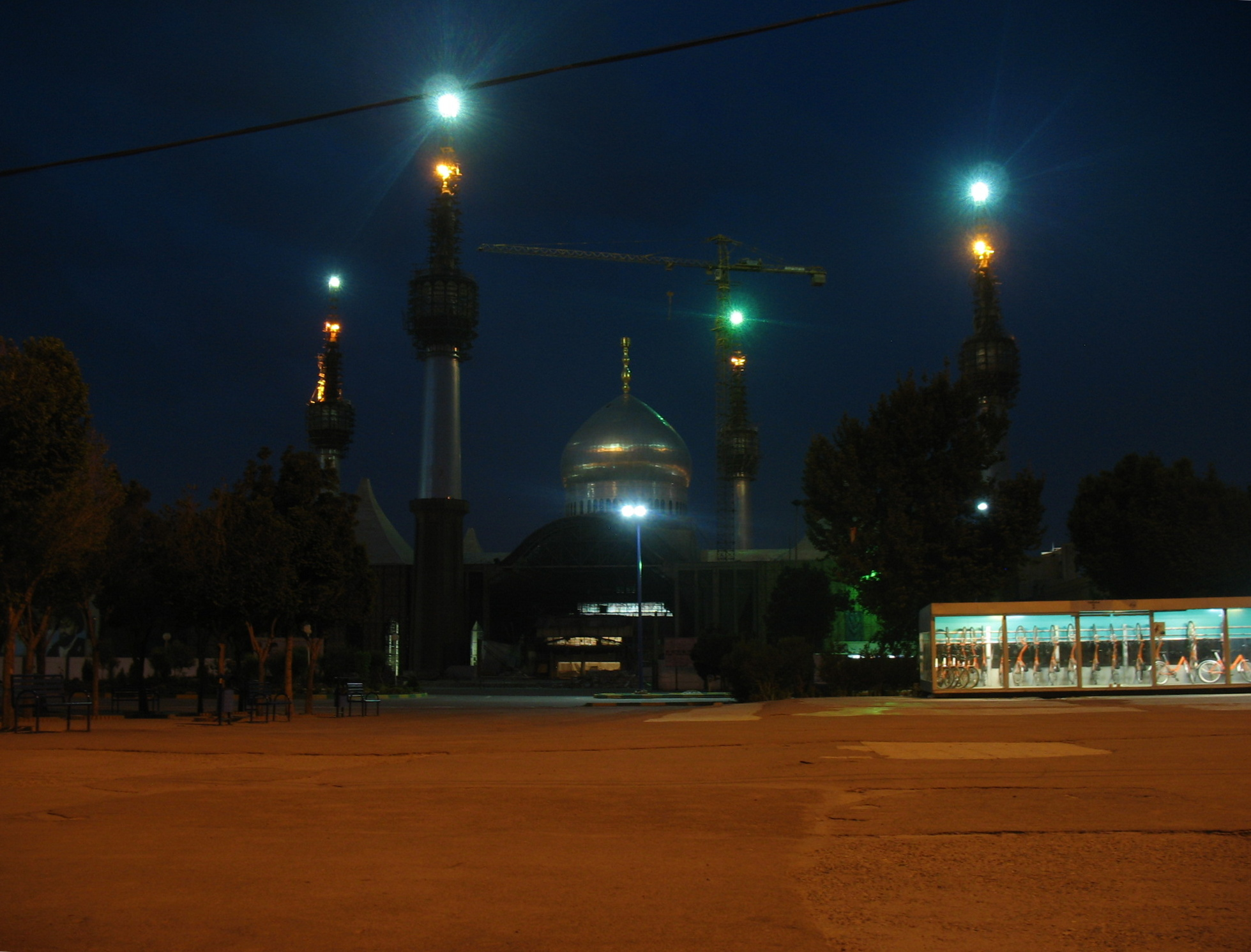

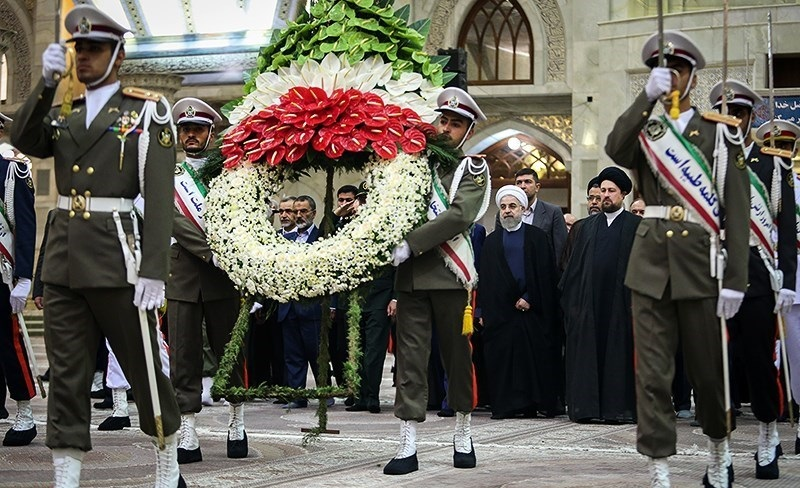

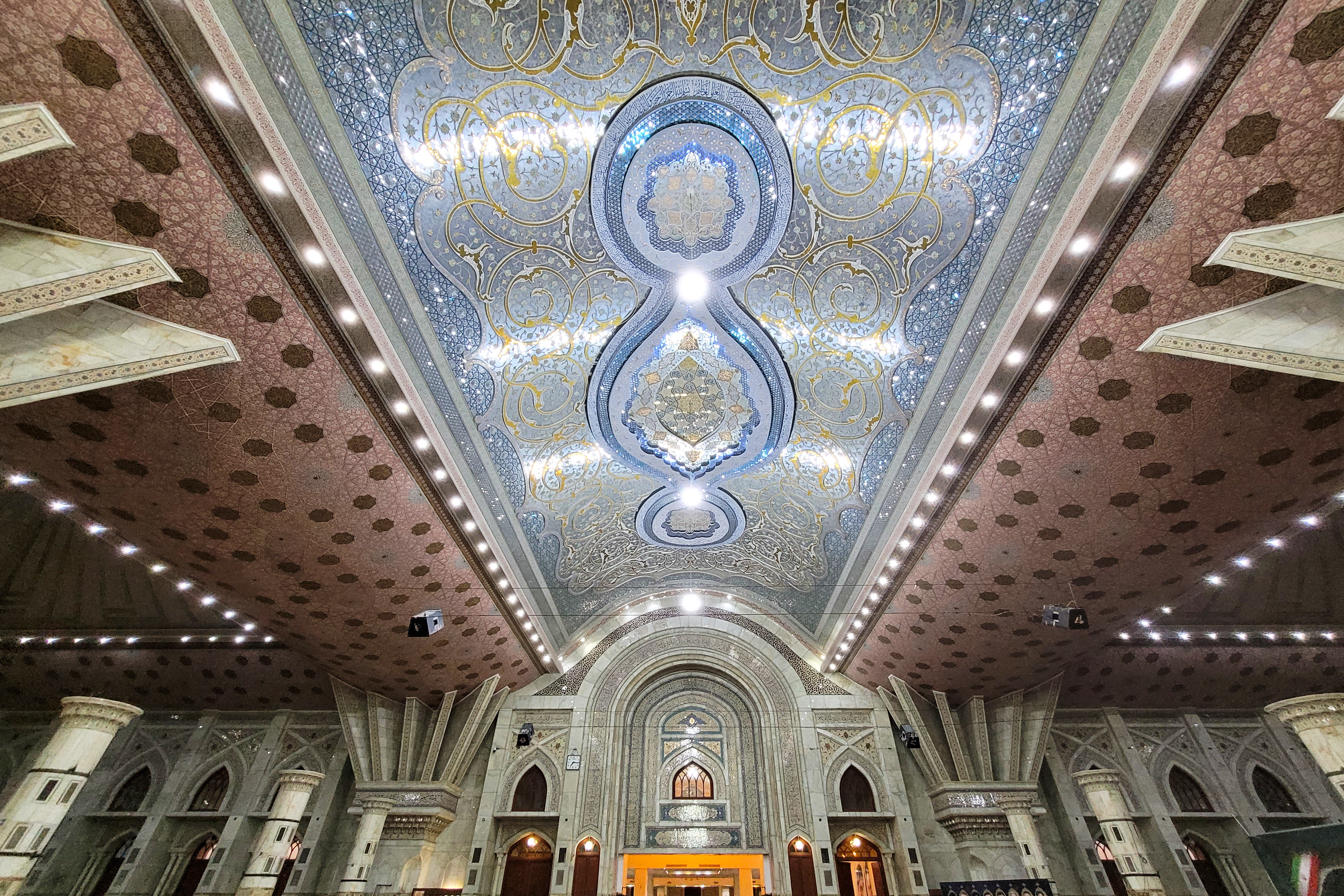

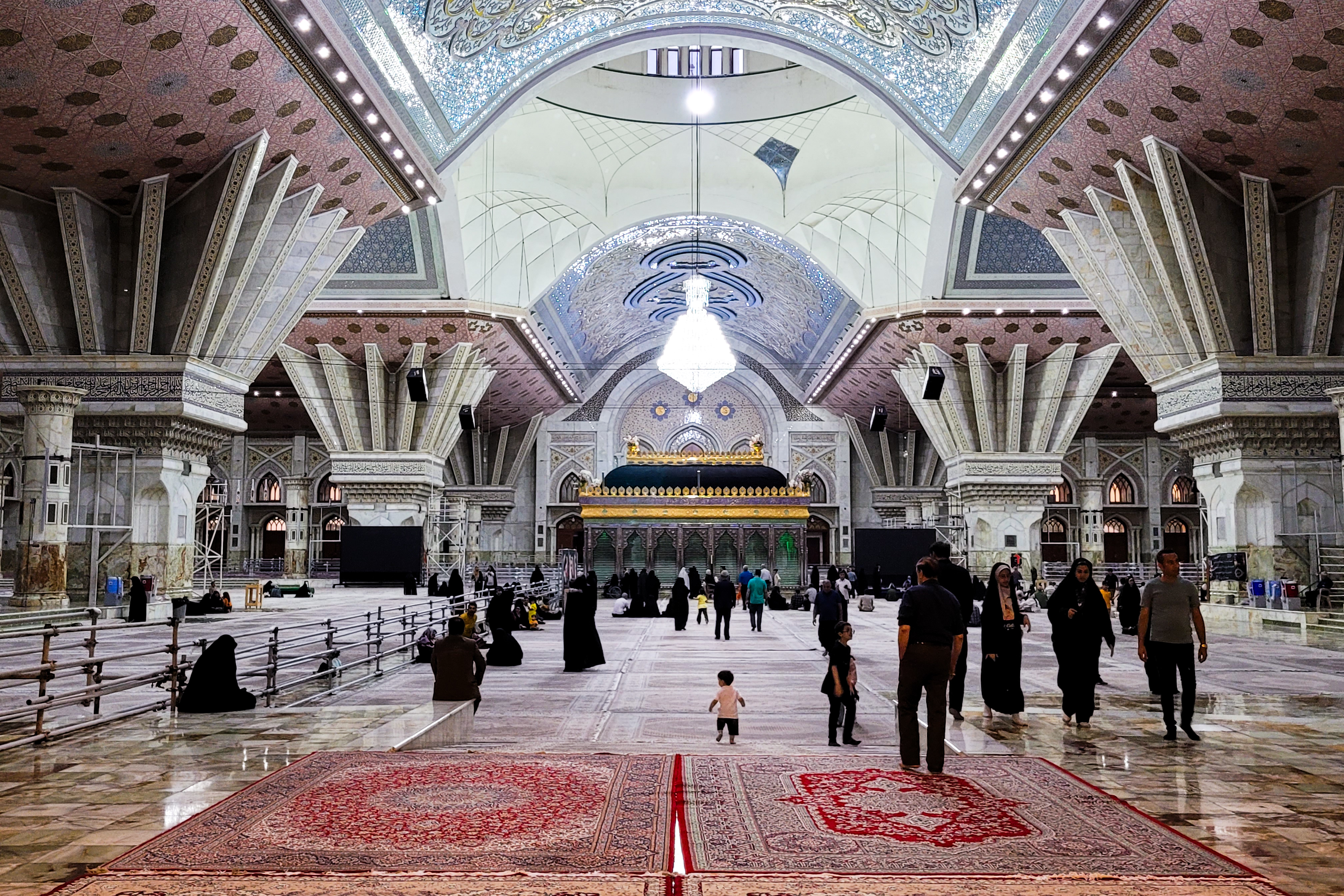

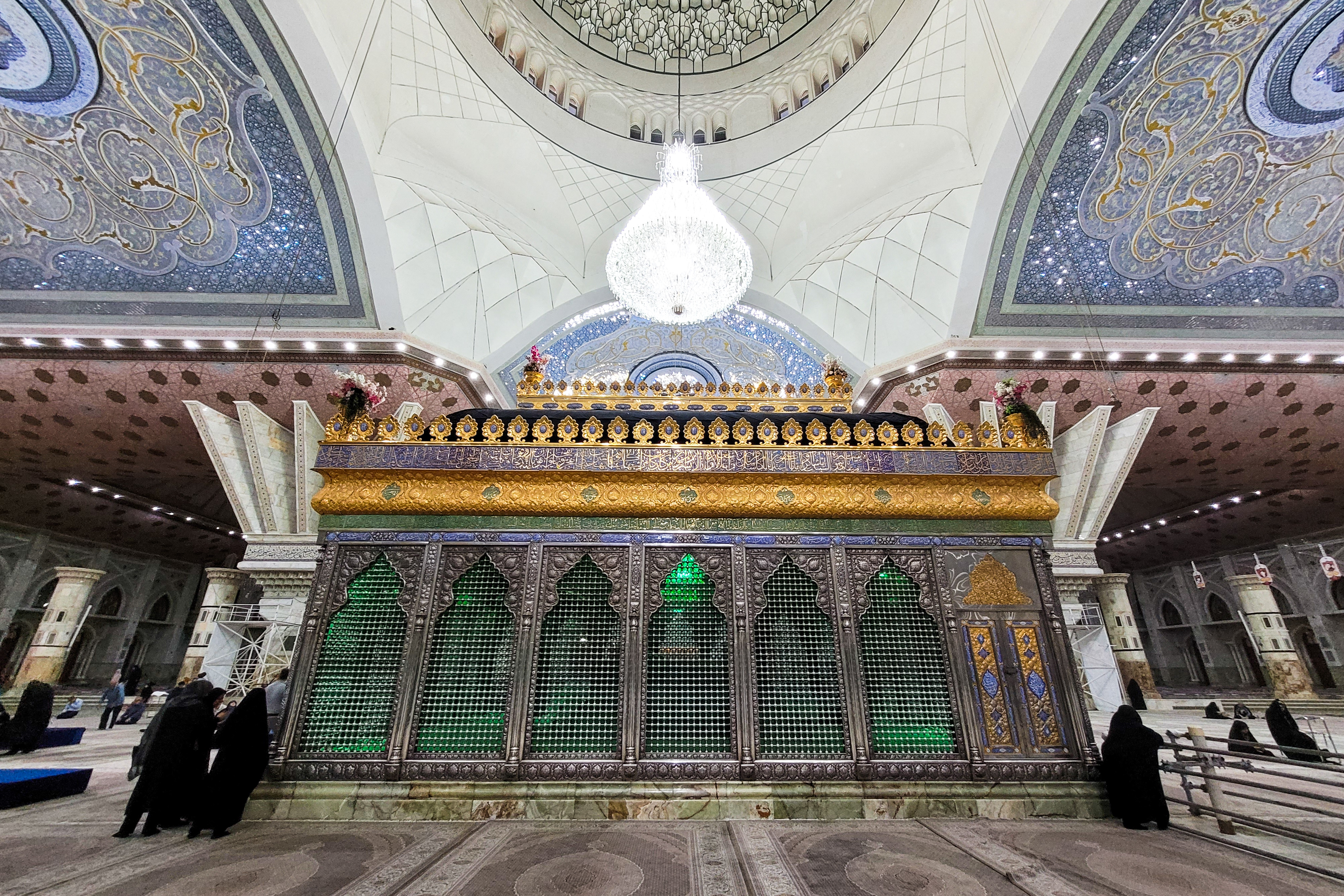
Zarih, inside the mausoleum

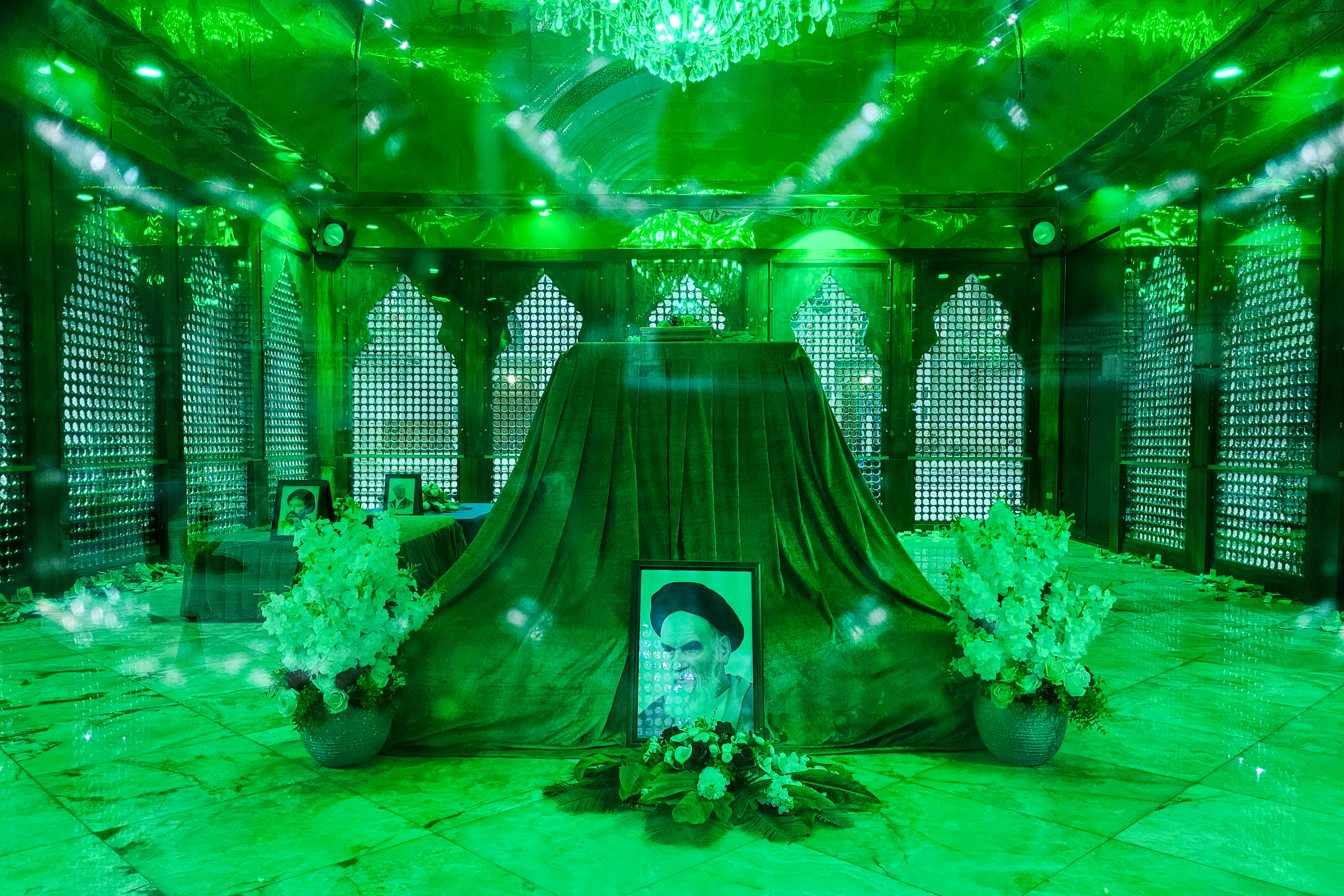
Inside zarih

Tombs in the yard

== See also ==
- Holiest sites in Shia Islam
- Shia Islam in Iran
- List of mausoleums in Iran
- List of mosques in Iran
- List of museums in Iran
