= Khamenei family =

Ruling family of Iran

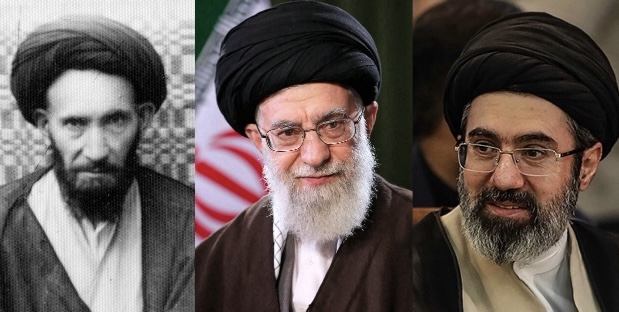
- From left to right: Javad Khamenei, Ali Khamenei, and Mojtaba Khamenei
- Parent family: Husaynids (claimed)
- Country: Iran
- Current region: West Asia
- Origin: Khameneh, Qajar Iran
- Founded: 1895; 131 years ago
- Founder: Javad Khamenei
- Current head: Mojtaba Khamenei
- Titles: Honorific title: Imam; Hujjat al-Islam; Sayyid; Ayatollah; Grand Ayatollah; Political titles: Supreme Leader of Iran; President of Iran; Commander-in-Chief of the Iranian Armed Forces; Member of Assembly of Experts for the Constitution; Member of Islamic Consultative Assembly; Deputy Chief of Staff for Political and Security Affairs; Wakil of the Office of the Supreme Leader; Head of the Supreme Defense Council
- Members: Javad Khamenei; Mohammad Khamenei; Hadi Khamenei; Badri Khamenei; Ali Tehrani; Farideh Moradkhani; Ali Khamenei; Mansoureh Khojasteh Bagherzadeh; Mostafa Khamenei; Mojtaba Khamenei; Zahra Haddad-Adel; Masoud Khamenei; Meysam Khamenei
- Connected members: Mohsen Kharazi; Kamal Kharrazi; Sadegh Kharazi; Mohammad Bagher Kharazi; Kamal Kharazi; Gholam-Ali Haddad-Adel; Mohammad Mohammadi Golpayegani; Azizollah Khoshvaght
- Distinctions: Husayn ibn Ali and Ali al-Sajjad (claimed)
- Traditions: Shia Islam (Twelver)

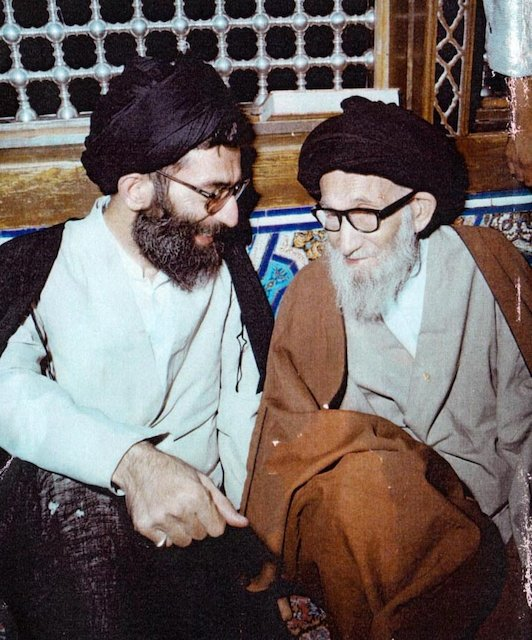
Ali Khamenei (left) with his father Javad

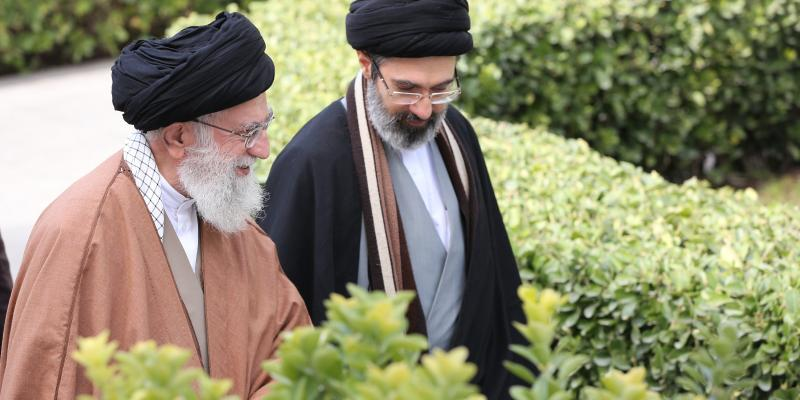
Mojtaba Khamenei (right) with his father Ali

The Khamenei family (Note: Iranian Persian: خاندان خامنه‌ای, romanized: xândân-e Xâmene'i; South Azerbaijani: خامنئی عایلسی, romanized: Xamenei ailəsi.) is an Iranian religious and political family that has ruled Iran as the state's supreme leader since Ali Khamenei was elected to the position as its second holder in 1989. After his assassination in February 2026, he was succeeded by his son, Mojtaba Khamenei. Their predecessors as the family of the supreme leader were the Khomeini family headed by Ruhollah Khomeini from 1979 to 1989.

The Khamenei family has played a prominent role in Iranian politics since the 1980s after Ali Khamenei became president of Iran in 1981. The family is of Iranian Azerbaijani origin and claim to be sayyids, descended from Ali al-Sajjad, the fourth Shia Imam. Ali Khamenei was the most powerful member of the family until his assassination.

== Ancestry ==
Ali Khamenei's father was the cleric Javad Khamenei, and his paternal grandfather was Hussein, who was buried in Najaf, Iraq (in the Wadi-us-Salaam cemetery). Hussein's father was Mohammad Hosseini Tafresshi, who was considered a Sayyid of Aftasi, whose family tree was connected to Sultan-al-Ulama Ahmad (also known as Seyyed Ahmad).

Mohammad Hosseini Tafreshi Khamenei Tabrizi was the son of Mohamad Taghi, who was the son of Mirza Ali-Akbar, who was the son of Fakhr-al-Din Tafreshi. The descendants of Fakhr-al-Din (also known as Mir-Fakhra) are called Mir-Fakhrayi.

The family's descent, known as "Sadat-e Hosseini", is likewise connected to the third Shia Imam, Husayn ibn Ali.

== Name ==
The name Khamenei is of Azerbaijani origin and derives from the city of Khamaneh in Iranian Azerbaijan.

=== Pronunciation ===
The name is pronounced [xɒːmeneˈʔiː] in Persian and [xɑmɯneˈji] in Iranian Azerbaijani, but English-language speakers vary in their pronunciation of the name. A news report by The New York Times during the 1989 Iranian supreme leader election stated the name was pronounced "kha-meh-neh-ee". Other English-language sources give the following pronunciations of the name:

- American Heritage Dictionary: /kəˈmeɪniː, xɑː-, ˈxɑːmeɪneɪ/ kə-MAY-nee, khah-, KHAH-may-nay;
- Collins English Dictionary: /ˌxɑːməˈniː/ KHAH-mə-NEE;
- Dictionary.com: /ˌxɑːməˈneɪ, -ˈniː, ˌkɑː-/ K(H)AH-mə-NAY, -NEE;
- Merriam-Webster.com Dictionary: /ˌxɑːmeɪˈneɪ/ KHAH-may-NAY;
- Pronouncing Dictionary of Proper Names: /xɑːˈmɛniː, hɑːˈmiːniː/ khah-MEN-ee, hah-MEE-nee;
- VOA Pronunciation Guide: /ˌhɑːmɛneɪˈiː/ HAH-men-ay-EE.

== Family tree ==
- Javad Khamenei (1895–1986)
  - Alavieh Khamenei
  - Batoul Khamenei
  - Fatemeh Soltan Khamenei
  - Mohammad Khamenei (b. 1935)
  - Ali Khamenei (1939–2026), married Mansoureh Khojasteh Bagherzadeh (b. 1947)
    - Mostafa Khamenei (b. 1965)
    - Mojtaba Khamenei (b. 1969), married Zahra Haddad-Adel (1979–2026)
      - Mohammad Bagher Khamenei
      - Fatemeh Sadaat Khamenei
      - Mohammad Amin Khamenei
    - Masoud Khamenei (b. 1974)
    - Meysam Khamenei (b. 1978)
    - Hoda Khamenei (1979–2026) married Mesbah Bagheri Kani (unknown–2026)
    - Boshra Khamenei (1980–2026) married a son of Mohammad Mohammadi Golpayegani
  - Badri Khamenei (b. 1942/1943), married Ali Tehrani (1926–2022)
    - Farideh Moradkhani (b. 1971)
  - Hadi Khamenei (b. 1948)
  - Mohammad Hassan Khamenei

== See also ==
- Kim family (North Korea)
- Assad family
- Tulfah family

== Bibliography ==
- Izady, Mehrdad (Fall 1989). "Persian Carrot and Turkish Stick: Contrasting Policies Targeted at Gaining State Loyalty from Azeris and Kurds". Kurdish Times. 3 (2): 31–47 – via ProQuest.
- Miller, Corey; Aghajanian-Stewart, Karineh (20 July 2017). A Frequency Dictionary of Persian: Core vocabulary for learners. Routledge. ISBN 978-1-317-56419-5.
