= Ahmad Mojtahedi Tehrani =

Iranian religious servant

Ayatollah Ahmad Mojtahedi Tehrani
- احمد مجتهدی تهرانی
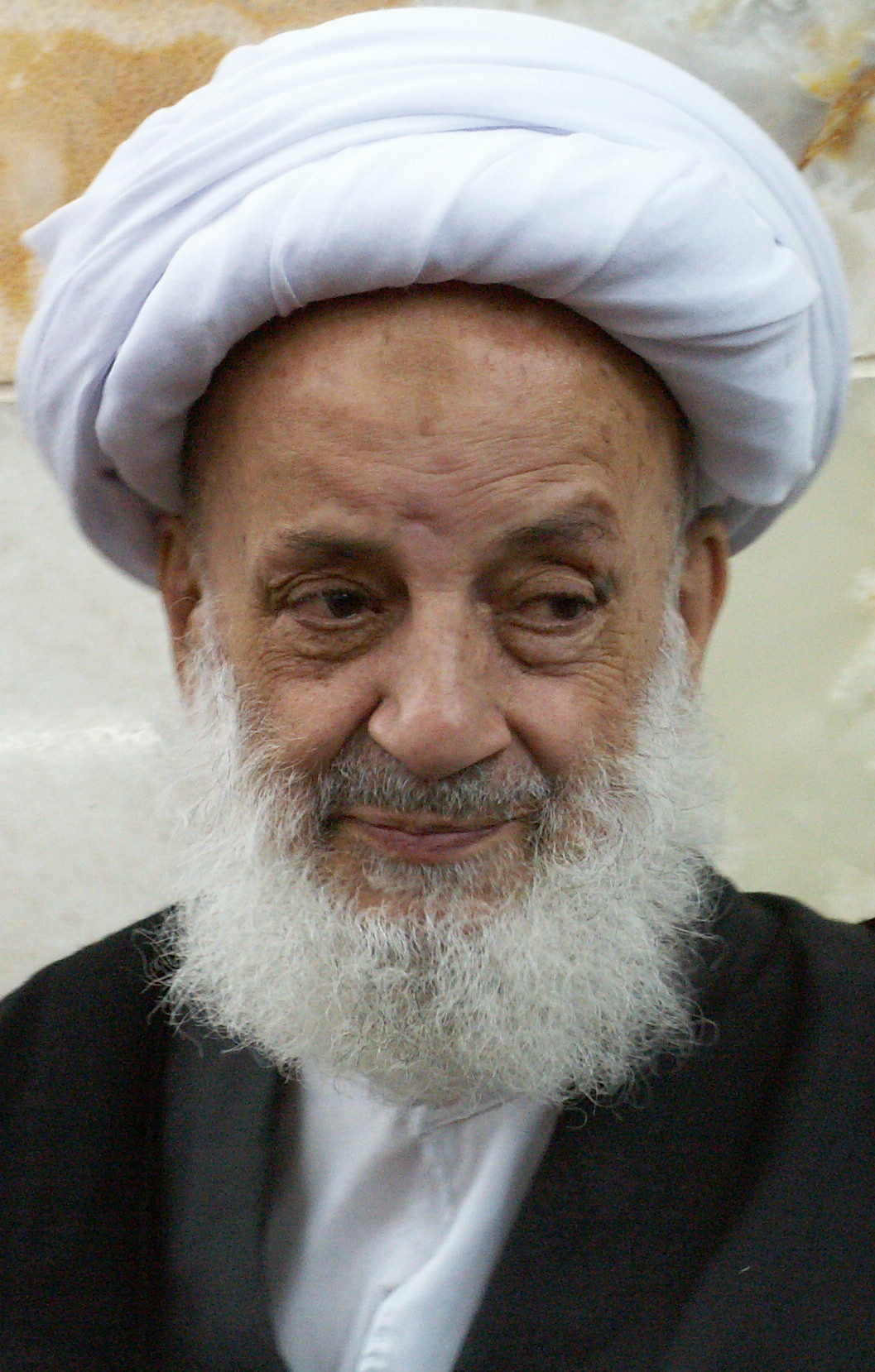

Personal life
- Born: 2 October 1923
- Died: 13 January 2008 (aged 84)
- Resting place: Fatima Masumeh Shrine
- Education: Fiqh, Principles of Islamic jurisprudence, Hadith studies

Religious life
- Religion: Shia Islam
- Sect: Twelver
- Profession: Faqīh, Marja'

Ayatollah Ahmad Mojtahedi Tehrani (Persian: احمد مجتهدی تهرانی) was an Iranian Twelver Shia ayatollah/scholar who was born on 2 October 1923 in Tehran in a religious family. His father was Mohammad-Baqer, and his grandfather was Mirza-Ahmad (a religious trader); and his ancestors were among the Shia clerics and scholars of Kashan.

Mujtahedi Tehrani, became an Islamic cleric at the age of 19, and was working at the market (of the city) before that. Five years later, i.e. at the age of 24 he got married. Beside education, he used to teach the books of Hawzah (to the students of Hawzah). This Shia scholar also established a Seminary with the help of religious traders/people. Finally, Mojtahedi Tehran died at the age of 84 on 13 January 2008 in Tehran.

== Seminary school ==
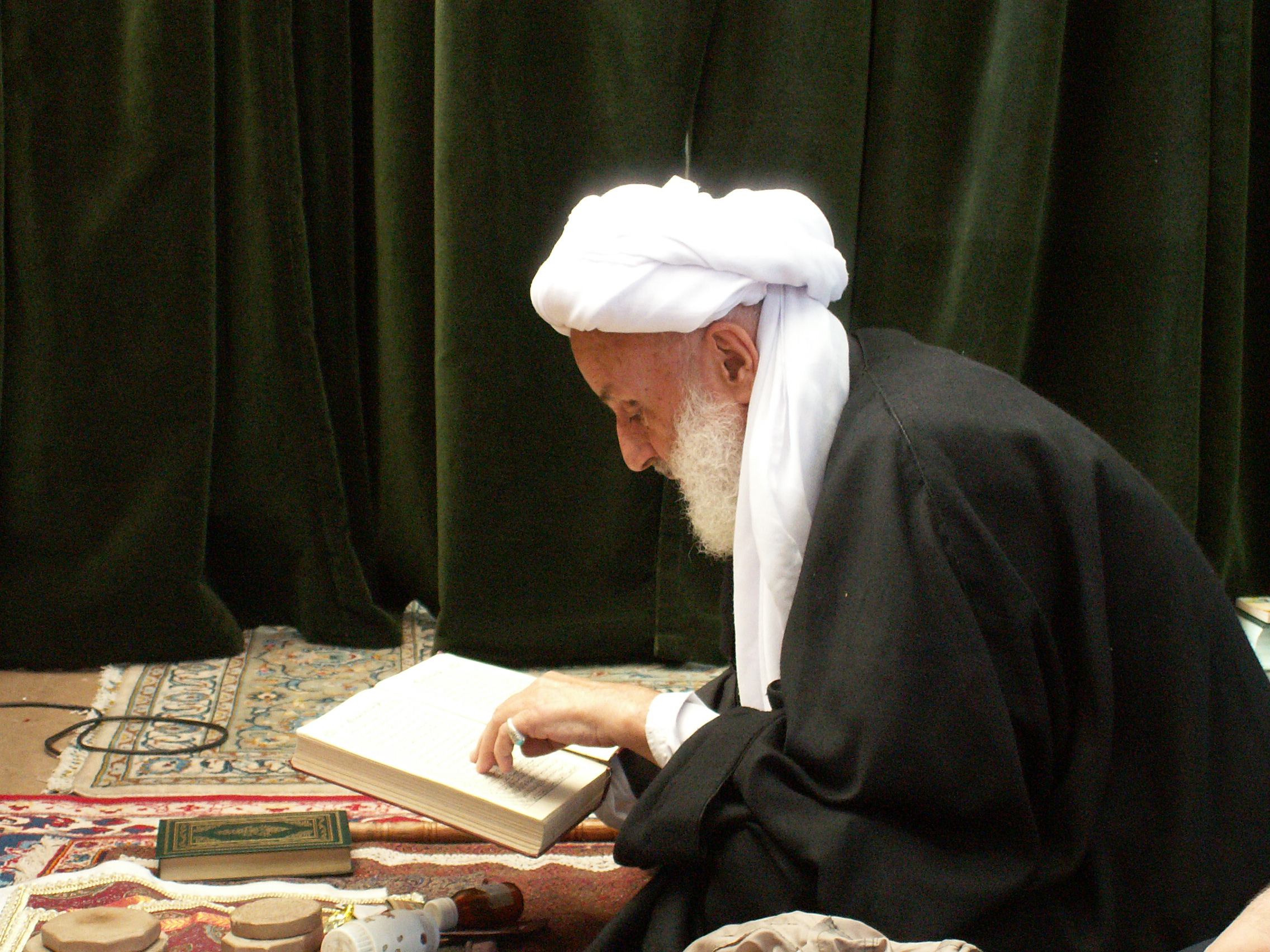
Ahmad Mojtahedi, is reading on his Prayer rug

Mojtahedi Tehrani was the manager of "Ayatollah Motahedi school", which was/is amongst the known Tehran Seminary-Schools. Among the graduated students of this seminary school are:

- Mostafa Chamran
- Mahmoud Ghandi
- Mohammad Javad Tondguyan
- Mohammad Boroujerdi
- Hassan Habibi
- Gholam-Ali Haddad-Adel
- Mohsen Kharazi
- Reza Ostadi
- Ali Akbar Mohtashamipur
- Ali Akbar Nategh-Nouri
- Mostafa Khamenei
- Mojtaba Khamenei
- Masoud Khamenei
- Meysam Khamenei
- Mohsen Kazeruni
- Seyed Mohammad Qaravi
- شهاب مرادی
- Mohammad Reza Naseri
- Mohammad Ali Fayaz Bakhsh

== Teachers ==
Mojtahedi Tehrani had teachers, such as:

- Ali Akbar Borhan
- Mohammad Javad Khandagh Abadi
- Seyed Morteza Alavi Fereiduni
- Seyed Mohammad Hossein Tabatabaei
- Abd Al-Razzagh Isfahani
- Mohammad Sadughi
- Seyed Mohammad Sadegh Tabatabaee
- Seyed Shahab Al-Din Marashi Najafi
- Seyed Sadegh Shariat Madari
- Seyed Hossein Tabatabai Borujerdi
- Seyed Mohammad Reza Golpayegani
- Abbas Ali Shahrudi
- Mohammad Reza Tonekaboni
- Seyed Ahmad Khansari
- Seyed Ruhollah Khomaini
- Seyed Hossein Fatemi Qomi
