= Mansoureh Khojasteh Bagherzadeh =

Widow of Ali Khamenei (born 1947)

- منصوره خجسته باقرزاده

Spouse of the Supreme Leader of Iran
- In role 4 June 1989 (Note: Acting until 6 August 1989) – 28 February 2026
- Supreme Leader: Ali Khamenei
- Preceded by: Khadijeh Saqafi
- Succeeded by: Vacant (Note: Zahra Haddad-Adel, the wife of Mojtaba Khamenei, had been killed during the assassination of her father-in-law, Ali Khamenei, eight days before her husband was elected as Supreme Leader.)

Spouse of the President of Iran
- In role 9 October 1981 – 16 August 1989
- President: Ali Khamenei
- Preceded by: Ateghe Sediqi
- Succeeded by: Effat Marashi

Personal details
- Born: c. 1947 (age 78–79) Mashhad, Khorasan Province, Imperial State of Iran
- Spouse: Ali Khamenei (m. 1964; died 2026)
- Children: 6, including Mostafa, Mojtaba, and Masoud
- Relatives: Khamenei family

Mansoureh Khojasteh Bagherzadeh (Persian: منصوره خجسته باقرزاده; born c. 1947) is the widow of Ali Khamenei, the third president of Iran from 1981 to 1989 and the second supreme leader of Iran from 1989 until his assassination in 2026. She is the mother of Mojtaba Khamenei, the third supreme leader of Iran.

Khojasteh Bagherzadeh was born in Mashhad, Iran, and married Khamenei in 1964. The couple had six children and she maintained a largely private public profile despite her husband's political role.

== Early life and marriage ==
Khojasteh Bagherzadeh was born in an Persian religious family in Mashhad. Her father was Mohammad Esmaeil Khojasteh Bagherzadeh, a famous businessman in Mashhad. She is the sister of Hassan Khojaste Bagherzadeh, former deputy director of the Islamic Republic of Iran Broadcasting. She first met Ali Khamenei in a private ceremony organized by Khamenei's mother in 1964, and they were wed the same year. Their marriage sermon was read by Ayatollah Mohammad Hadi Milani. The wedding was paid for by Bagherzadeh's family. They initially settled at an apartment rented from Khamenei's brother-in-law, Ali Tehrani.

Bagherzadeh and Khamenei had four sons and two daughters:

- Mostafa, who is mostly engaged in seminary studies. He married the daughter of Azizollah Khoshvaght.
- Mojtaba, who is more prominent in the country's media and politics. He married Zahra Haddad-Adel, daughter of Gholam Ali Haddad Adel in 1999. She was killed during the assassination of Ali Khamenei. In 2026, Mojtaba was elected the 3rd Supreme Leader of Iran, succeeding his father.
- Masoud married the daughter of Seyyed Mohsen Kharazi and has a family relationship with Kamal and Sadegh Kharazi.
- Meysam married the daughter of Mahmoud Lolachian, one of Tehran's religious bazaar merchants. Like Seyyed Masoud, he also collaborates with the office for preserving and publishing the works of "the Leader of the Revolution".
- Boshra married the son of Mohammad Mohammadi Golpayegani. She and her daughter Zahra Mohammadi Golpayegani died during the airstrikes that resulted in the death of Ali Khamenei.
- Hoda married Mesbah Bagheri Kani, the son of Mohammad Bagher Bagheri. Her husband died in the same airstrike that killed Ali Khamenei.

Khamenei stated that his wife, during the period of his imprisonment and struggle before the 1979 revolution, "never expressed concern or complaints about me, and in fact she encouraged me in numerous matters. There were times... when some individuals and secret groups visited our home, including important and high-ranking people... she did not question me, did not try to interrogate me... she had no opposition at all, and in fact she even helped." He later revealed that she facilitated a meeting between him and Akbar Hashemi Rafsanjani in 1972, by introducing herself to prison guards as Rafsanjani's sister.

== Activities ==
Bagherzadeh had a limited public role during her husband's tenure as president and later supreme leader of the Islamic Republic of Iran. She refrained from adopting any political positions. Khamenei's official website described her as a "patient spouse" and she did give two official interviews. One such interview was given in the early 1990s to the English-language magazine Mahjubeh, affiliated with the Islamic Culture and Relations Organization, in which she shared memories of her married life with Khamenei. She stated that her most important role was "maintaining a peaceful atmosphere at home". She added: "Of course, I was also involved in various activities such as distributing leaflets, carrying messages, hiding documents, and the like. But I think these are hardly worth mentioning. In the final months of the struggle, regarding the telephone messages of Imam Khomeini from Paris, I would send them for duplication and distribution to centers in Mashhad and other cities, and I would collect news from Mashhad and other cities in Khorasan and transmit it to Paris." She had sat for another interview with the Islamic Republican newspaper in 1983.

With the release of interrogation videos of Fahimeh Dorri Nogorani, the wife of Saeed Emami, deputy minister of intelligence during the chain murders of Iran, accounts were also shared regarding her connections to Bagherzadeh. In 1999, the now-defunct website Nusazi published an article titled "Revisiting a Violated Right" quoting Dorri Nogorani about the relationship between Khamenei's family and the family of Saeed Emami. The article referred to a "secret trip" by Khamenei's family to London and stated that Emami accompanied them on this trip, and that Bagherzadeh even washed his clothes. Nusazi claimed that this account came from unpublished interviews in the Islamic Revolution Document Center. The claim was not denied or refuted by Ruhollah Hosseinian, the director of the center at the time.

Bagherzadeh was present at certain meetings and ceremonies. She would regularly visit the families of deceased military personnel and officials, and the wife of Dariush Rezaeinejad—one of the nuclear scientists who was killed on 23 July 2011—claimed in a documentary broadcast by the Islamic Republic that Bagherzadeh had visited their home "several times". Despite the lack of in depth information about her activities and affairs, Jamileh Alamolhoda, the wife of President Ebrahim Raisi, described Bagherzadeh as "just a simple teacher" who was the only senior female figure in the country deserving of the title "first lady". The wives of political prisoners, including Fakhrossadat Mohtashamipour (the wife of Mostafa Tajzadeh), had written letters to Bagherzadeh on several occasions, asking her to help secure their release.

In June 2010, she was hospitalized at the Baghiyyatollah al-Azam Military Hospital for several days and underwent surgery without reports specifying the exact timing or cause of the illness.

== 2026 airstrike and reports of death ==
It was announced on IRIB TV2 that Bagherzadeh had died on 2 March 2026 during the Iran war, from injuries sustained in the same United States and Israeli airstrike that killed her husband two days earlier. However, the Fars News Agency announced on 12 March 2026 that she was still alive.

== Notes ==
Honorary titles
Preceded by Ateghe Sediqi as wife of Mohammad-Ali Rajai	Spouse of the President of Iran; 1981–1989	Succeeded by Effat Marashi as wife of Akbar Hashemi Rafsanjani
Preceded by Khadijeh Saqafi as wife of Ruhollah Khomeini	Spouse of the Supreme Leader of Iran; 1989–2026	Vacant
