= Kharazi =

Kharazi (Persian: خرازی) or Kharrazi is a surname. Notable people with the surname include:

- Husayn Kharrazi (1957–1987), Iranian military officer
- Kamal Kharazi (1944–2026), Iranian politician and diplomat
- Mohammad Bagher Kharazi (born 1961), Iranian cleric and politician
- Mohsen Kharazi (born 1937), Iranian official, member of the Assembly of Experts
- Sadegh Kharazi (born 1963), Iranian diplomat and former presidential advisor

== See also ==
- Kharazia, an Abkhazian surname
