= Mostafa Khamenei =

Iranian cleric (born 1967)

Seyyed Mostafa Khamenei
- سید مصطفیٰ خامنه‌ای
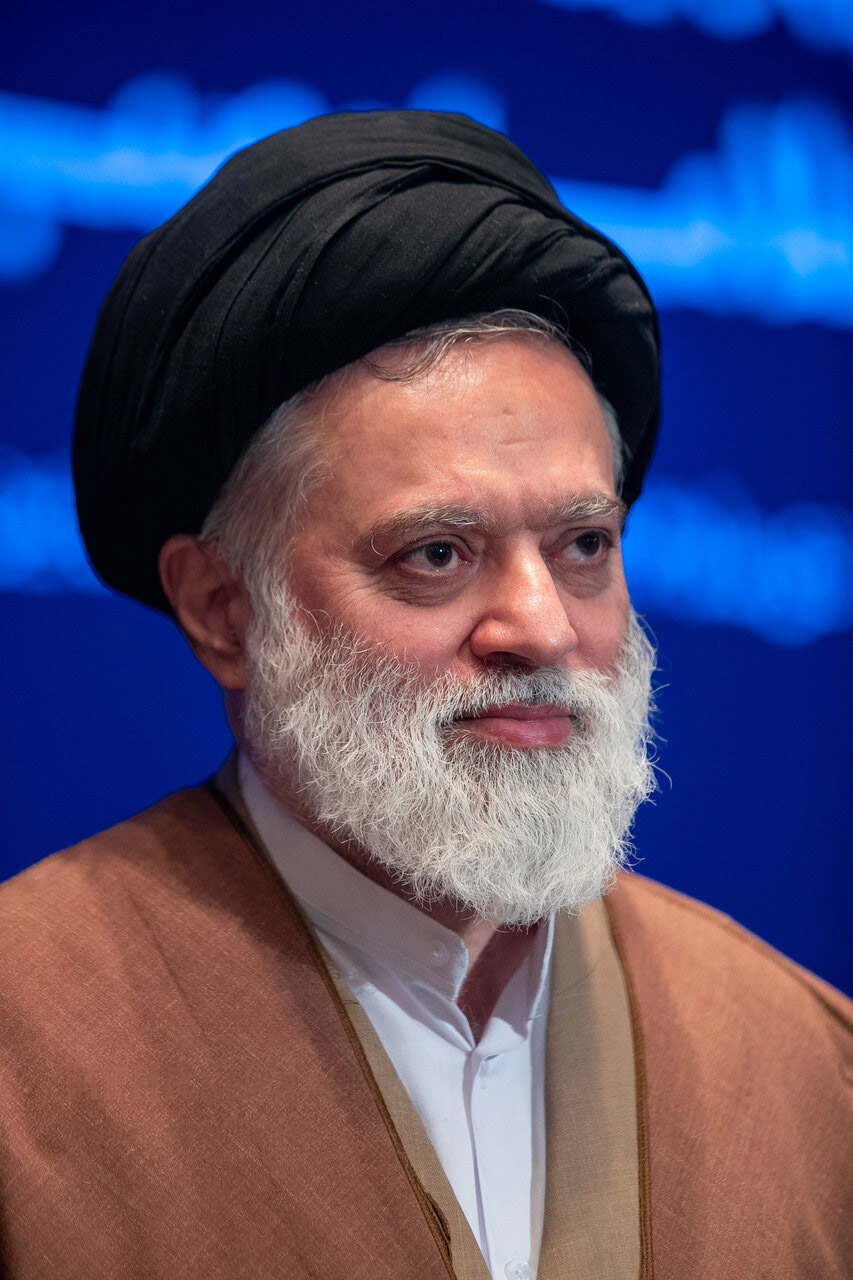
- Khamenei in 2025
- Born: Mostafa Hosseini Khamenei; 1965 (age 60–61); Mashhad, Khorasan Province, Imperial State of Iran
- Parents: Ali Khamenei; Mansoureh Khojasteh Bagherzadeh
- Relatives: Khamenei family
- Military career
- Allegiance: Iran
- Branch: Islamic Republic of Iran Ground Forces
- Service years: 1983–1985
- Conflicts: Iran–Iraq War; Operation Badr

Personal life
- Education: Qom Seminary

Religious life
- Religion: Shia Islam
- Denomination: Twelver
- Jurisprudence: Usuli

Senior posting
- Teacher: Ali Khamenei; Mahmoud Hashemi Shahroudi; Mohammad-Taqi Mesbah-Yazdi; Lotfollah Safi Golpaygani; Mohammad Bagher Kharazi

Mostafa Hosseini Khamenei (Persian: سید مصطفی حسینی خامنه‌ای; born c. 1965) is an Iranian Shia cleric. A member of the Khamenei family, he is the eldest son of the second Iranian supreme leader Ali Khamenei, and the elder brother of the third and current supreme leader Mojtaba Khamenei.

== Early life ==
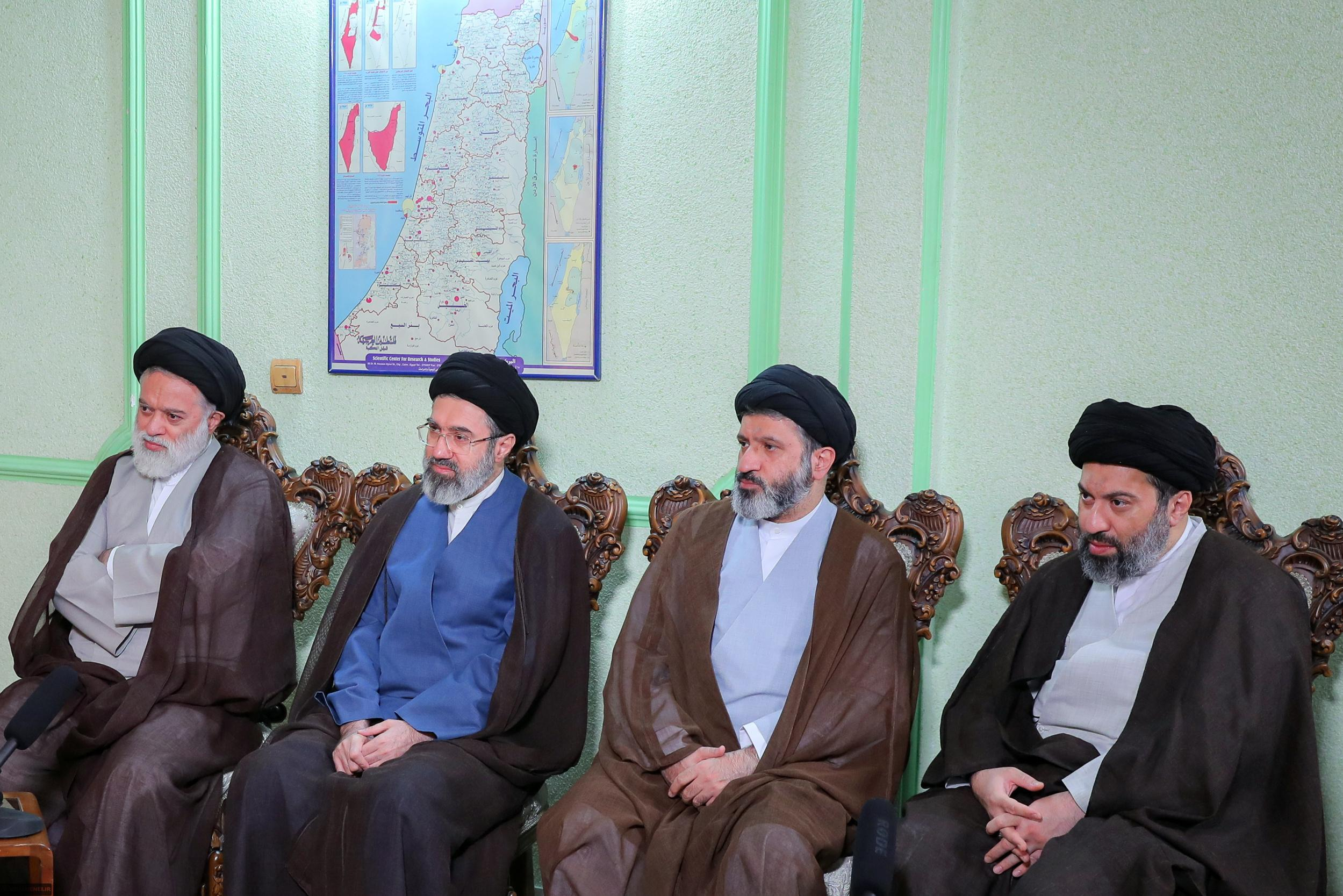
Khamenei (far left) with his three brothers, from left to right: Mojtaba, Masoud, and Meysam

Mostafa Hosseini Khamenei was born in 1965 in Mashad as the eldest child of Ali Khamenei and Mansoureh Khojasteh Bagherzadeh. His five siblings are Mojtaba, Masoud, and Meysam, his younger brothers, and Boshra and Hoda, his younger sisters. His paternal grandfather, Javad Khamenei, was a poor and low-income but deeply respected Shia cleric and scholar.

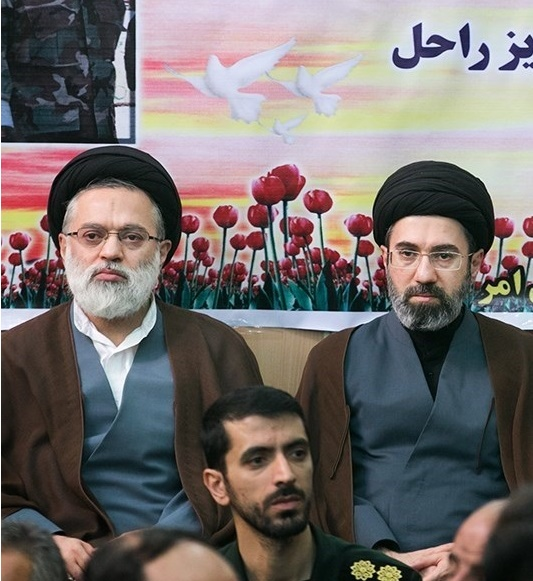
Khamenei (left) with Mojtaba (right) in May 2016

Khamenei has Persian ancestry, but to a lesser extent, Azerbaijani Turk, with his Azeri roots being traced back to Khamaneh, a small town in East Azerbaijan where his surname originated from, and he also has distant roots from Tafresh. His family traces its lineage to Husayn ibn Ali, the son of Ali, the first Shia Imam, and the maternal grandson of Prophet Muhammad, hence Khamenei's middle name Hosseini (spelled Husayni in Arabic; meaning "descendant of Husayn"). Khamenei is married to a daughter of Azizollah Khoshvaght.
