= Iranology Foundation =

Institute of Historical Research on Iran

Agency overview
- Formed: 1997; 28 years ago
- Type: Government agency
- Headquarters: Tehran, Iran; 35.7474679°N 51.3942016°E
- Agency executive: Ali Akbar Salehi since 2025, President
- Website: en.iranology.ir

The Iranology Foundation is a scientific and research institute in Iran and Iranian studies is the main field of its activities. The Foundation's studies and researches are all topics and issues related to various manifestations of Iranian culture and civilization. The institute was established in 1997 under the supervision of the Presidential Administration of Iran.

== History ==
The Iranology Foundation was established in 1997 with the efforts of Hassan Habibi and under the supervision of then President Mohammad Khatami. The Higher Education Development Council of Iran approved the statute of the Iranology Foundation on April 23, 1997, and the related amendments were approved in the meetings dated January 3, 1998 and June 20, 1998.

The Articles of Association of the Iranology Foundation were approved by the Higher Education Development Council of Iran on May 24, 1997. According to the articles of association, the Iranology Foundation is a scientific-research institute with legal personality with Iranian citizenship and affiliated with the Presidential Administration of Iran. All activities of the foundation are carried out within the framework of rules, laws and regulations approved by the Ministry of Science, Research and Technology.

Dr. Hassan Habibi, who was the founder of the foundation and was its first president until the end of his life (January 31, 2013). Mohammad Khamenei was appointed as president of foundation by the decree of the then president Mahmoud Ahmadinejad in July 2013.

The first office of the Iranology Foundation was in Tehran. The foundation expanded rapidly and has 18 branches in other provinces of Iran. The activity of the branches of the Iranology Foundation is based on Article 3 of the Articles of Association, approved on July 24, 1998: The goals and policies of the provincial branches of the foundation are the same as the goals and policies of the Iranology Foundation that are pursued at the regional and provincial levels. Branches includes:

- Bushehr, Bushehr Province
- Yazd, Yazd Province
- Tabriz, East Azerbaijan Province
- Urmia, Urmia County, West Azerbaijan Province
- Shahr-e Kord, Chaharmahal and Bakhtiari Province
- Zahedan, Sistan and Baluchestan Province
- Kerman, Kerman Province
- Ardabil, Ardabil Province
- Arak, Markazi Province
- Yasuj, Kohgiluyeh and Boyer-Ahmad Province
- Kermanshah, Kermanshah Province
- Sanandaj, Kurdistan Province
- Semnan, Semnan Province
- Qazvin, Qazvin Province
- Ilam, Ilam Province
- Hamadan, Hamadan Province
- Khorramabad, Lorestan Province
- Nahavand, Nahavand County, Hamadan Province

Due to efforts of the Iranology Foundation, today there are more than 660 centers and institutes of Iranian studies in the world and 342 centers and institutes of Iranian studies in Iran.

== Organizational structure ==
The administration of the Iranology Foundation is the responsibility of its board of trustees. One member of the board of trustees is elected by the President as the President of the Foundation for a term of four years. Hassan Habibi (a descendant of Mullah Mohammad Ali Mojtahed Kashani) was the founder of the foundation and was its chairman until the end of his life (January 31, 2013). Mohammad Khamenei was appointed to this position by the decree of the then president Mahmoud Ahmadinejad in July 2013.

On August 27, 2013, Mohammad Khamenei appointed Fathollah Mojtabaei, Reza Davari Ardakani, Gholamreza Aavani, Mohammad-Hassan Nami, Hekmatullah Mulla Salehi, and Mohammad Reza Mokhber Dezfouli as members of the Board of Trustees of the Iranology Foundation.

According to Article 4 of the Articles of Association, the main roles of the Iranology Foundation are: High presidency (President of Iran), Board of Trustees, Head of the Foundation, and Research Council.

The foundation consists of two deputies:

- Research Deputy Office
- Information and International Affairs Deputy Office

And three section:

- Education and postgraduate studies
- Documentation Center and Central Library
- Conference department

== Objectives of the Foundation ==
The main objectives of the Iranology Foundation according to Article 1 of its Articles of Association are as follows:

1. implementing a suitable environment for the study and use of intellectuals, scholars and students interested in Iranian studies.
2. Organizing and coordinating scientific researches in the field of Iranology in order to use them in the foundation and using appropriate and new methods in this field and finding new methods in interdisciplinary researches and proposing them to institutions interested in Study of Iranology in Iran and other parts of the world.
3. Raising the level of awareness of social and cultural groups of the Iranian people about the historical background, civilization and culture of Iran and strengthening their sense of patriotism and idealism and strengthening the pillars of national identity and resistance against various hidden and overt manifestations of foreign cultural invasion.

== Tasks of the Foundation ==
Responsibilities and tasks of the Iranology Foundation are described in Article 2 of the Foundation's Articles of Association:

- Determining the concept and scope of Iranian studies and researches and revising them, at least once a year, according to new scientific and technical achievements.
- Determining research priorities at the foundation and preparing a list of important research topics that may be the subject of master's and doctoral dissertations.
- Critique and review of published researches and works in the field of Iranology as well as Islamology, especially the section related to Iran.
- Measuring the performance and evaluating the results of the completed researches and the achievements of important national and international conferences on Iranology and how to use them.
- Providing the preparations and equipment and facilities and developing the necessary research programs at different levels in order to implement the goals of the foundation mentioned in article 1.
- Providing comprehensive and inclusive information necessary for conducting scientific research in the field of Iranology, by collecting credible references and sources about the various manifestations of culture and civilization of Iran, around the world in the form of books, treatises and articles written in different languages.
- Preparation and collection of works of art including paintings, handicrafts, manuscripts and historical references and stamps and other documents about Iran's history.
- Assist in conducting Iranian studies and prepare a research plan on issues related to Iranian-Islamic civilization and publish it for use by researchers and scientific institutes inside and outside the country.
- Creating an information network and preparing medias in the field of Iranology.
- Planning for the qualitative and quantitative improvement of Iranian studies and researches and holding conferences with question and answer sessions as well as monthly or quarterly lecture sessions by Iranian and non-Iranian scientists and researchers.
- Preparation of lists, specifications and transcripts of universities and scientific and cultural centers and libraries inside and outside the country that are active in the field of Iranology and establishing extensive cooperation with them, especially with the Academy of Sciences of Iran.
- Preparation of a database of information related to Iranian and non-Iranian Iranologists and Islamologists (name, list of researches, books and articles, etc.) in order to mutually use their scientific experiences in the field of Iranology and to coordinate activities to information exchange.
- Publishing affairs such as researching, compiling, translating and publishing books, magazines and thematic bibliography and catalogs etc. in the field of Iranology.
- Planning to produce documentaries on the industrial, artistic, cultural and civilizational aspects of Iran's historical, artistic and architectural works.
- Publication of a specialized quarterly on Iranology, as well as compiling an annual or biennial national and international report on Iranian studies.

== Duties of the provincial branches ==
Some of the duties of the provincial branches of the Iranology Foundation in the provincial branches by-laws:

- Determining study and research priorities in the field of history, culture, customs, dialect and coverage of the people of the province or region and determining the appropriate research topics for academic dissertations.
- Preparation of facilities and development of necessary research programs.
- Collecting the characteristics, researches, writings and works of the elites and intellectuals and cooperating with the authorities in order to introduce them to the people and especially to the youth.
- Preparation of a list of studies and researches conducted in various fields related to the province.
- Carrying out research programs approved by the Research Council of the Iranology Foundation.

== See also ==
- List of Iranian research centers
- Science and technology in Iran
- Academy of Sciences of Iran
