= Mohammad Khamenei =

Iranian Ayatollah (born 1935)

Ayatollah Seyyed Mohammad Khamenei
- محمد خامنه‌ای
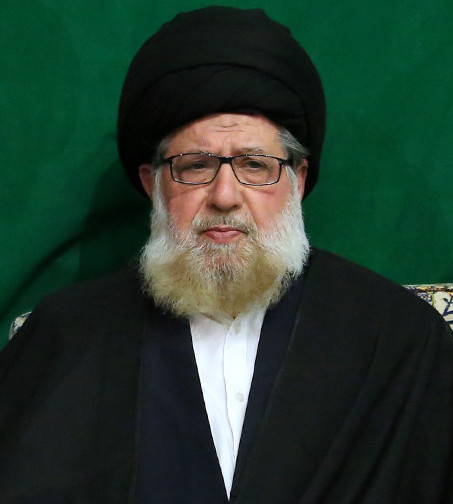
- Khamenei in 2015

Member of the Islamic Consultative Assembly
- In office 28 May 1980 – 27 May 1988
- Constituency: Mashhad
- Majority: 472,446 (76.4%)

Member of the Assembly of Experts for Constitution
- In office 19 August 1979 – 19 November 1979
- Constituency: Khorasan Province
- Majority: 640,958 (60.3%)

Personal details
- Born: 25 December 1935 (age 90) Mashhad, Imperial State of Iran
- Parent: Javad Khamenei (father)
- Relatives: Khamenei family
- Education: Qom Seminary; University of Tehran

Mohammad Khamenei (Persian: محمد خامنه‌ای, born 25 December 1935) is an Iranian cleric and politician. He is the older brother of Ali Khamenei, the second supreme leader of Iran, and Hadi Khamenei, and the uncle of Mojtaba Khamenei, the third and current Supreme Leader. Currently, he is the president of Iranology Foundation, and Sadra Islamic Wisdom Foundation, he is a professor at Allameh Tabataba'i University, School of International Relations and Al-Zahra University. He was also one of the compilers of the Constitution of the Islamic Republic of Iran and a member for the Islamic Consultative Assembly representing Mashhad.

== Biography ==
Seyyed Mohammad Khamenei was born on 25 December 1935 to a religious family in Mashhad. He is the oldest son of Javad Khamenei and Khadijeh Mirdamadi. He is the older brother of former Supreme Leader of Iran, Ali Khamenei. He studied religious sciences and Arabic with his father at a young age, when he was 12 he started studying Tajweed and the meanings and interpretation of the Quran at Nawab School in Howzah in Mashhad a with teachers such as Ayatollah Mohammad Hadi al-Milani, Ayatollah Hashem Qazvini, Ayatollah Mirza Javad Tehrani. In 1955, he went to Qom where he was taught philosophy with Ayatollah Muhammad Husayn Tabatabai, and other subjects with Ayatollah Ruhollah Khomeini and Ayatollah Hossein Borujerdi. In 1964, he graduated from Tehran School of Law and Political Science in Criminal Justice.

== Political activism ==
=== Before 1979 Revolution ===
Seyyed Mohammad Khamenei started his political activities from 1951 to 1953 with the Nationalization of the Iranian oil industry. He supported Abol-Ghasem Kashani and other clergy who advocated for the Nationalisation of the Iranian oil industry, he was very vocal about these ideas when he was a student in Nawab School, where he would often participate in rallies and lectures.

With the arrival of Ruhollah Khomeini on the political scene in Iran, he was very supportive of him and would distribute his tapes in Qom, Tehran, and Mashhad among others. Although he was heavily involved with the ongoing political climate in Iran during the '70s, he was never prosecuted by SAVAK as they didn't have files on him unlike his brothers. As the struggles intensified, he alongside others formed a secret group consisting of 11 members whose aim was to try and establish a centre to fight the Pahlavi regime. The members of this group was, Ali Khamenei, Ali Meshkini, Ahmad Azari Qomi, Akbar Hashemi Rafsanjani, Mohammad-Taqi Mesbah-Yazdi, Hussein-Ali Montazeri, Abdulrahim Shirazi, Mehdi Haeri Tehrani, Ali Qoddusi and Ebrahim Amini. The responsibility of Mohammad Khamenei in this group was to draft the group's charter, he wrote in Arabic for safety precautions however in the end SAVAK infiltrated the group and some members were arrested.

=== After 1979 Revolution ===
Seyyed Mohammad Khamenei was involved with drafting of the Constitution as he was one of the 75 members of the Assembly of Experts for Constitution. He served in the first term as a representative of Razavi Khorasan. He was one of the 53 voters in favour for Velayat Faqih to be a part of the constitution. He was also involved with the drafting of the Algiers Accords between Iran and United States of America to help free the American hostages during the Iran hostage crisis.

He served the head of the Judicial Commissions during his first term in Islamic Consultative Assembly. He was one of the first opponents of the president at the time, Abolhassan Banisadr. During his second term, he was one of the eight lawmakers who was vocal against the Iran–Contra affair and was questioning the credibility of the foreign minister at the time, Ali Akbar Velayati.

== Assassination attempt ==
On 10 January 1982, gunmen opened fire on Seyyed Mohammad Khamenei as he was leaving the assembly. He was shot in the back by the assailants and spent some time in hospital to recover from his injuries. However, his two bodyguards died during the attack.

== Scientific and Islamic activities ==
Seyyed Mohammad Khamenei resigned from political activities after the end of his second term in the Islamic Consultative Assembly and primarily focused on Islamic Philosophy, and Islamic Sciences. He was one of the founders of the Sadra Islamic Wisdom Foundation in 2000. Here he focused on his Islamic Sciences, as they have several departments that have been active since. He has also been in involved with research and teaching in Allameh Tabataba'i University, School of International Relations, Al-Zahra University and Islamic Azad University.

He has both translated and written many books such as.

- Secrets of the Earth in the Quran (Translated from English)
- Insurance in Islamic Law (Translated from Arabic)
- Religion and Theology (Written)
- Judicial Sciences (Written)
- Spirit and Soul (Written)
- Mulla Sadra's Transcendent Philosophy (Written)
- Philosophy of being a Woman (Written)
- Imam Ali and World Peace (Written)
- Mulla Sadra’s Life, Character, and Philosophy (Written)
- Characteristics of the Islamic Worldview (Translated from Arabic)
- The Course of Wisdom in Iran and the World (Written)

And many more.

== Cyrus The Great and Ancient Iran ==
Seyyed Mohammad Khamenei has also done some research into the philosophy, wisdom, and history of Ancient Iran (Pre-Islamic Iran). He published a book about this called 'The Cours of Wisdom in Iran and the World'. Currently he is the president of the Iranology Foundation, and said in an event held by Sadra Islamic Wisdom Foundation:

In ancient Iran, whether Aryan or indigenous Iranian governments (such as the Elamites or the northern Caspians or the Manichaean civilizations and the central regions in Kashan and Kerman) are all the founders of rich cultures and the production of science and art. And have typically been promoters of monotheism and morality. For example, Cyrus the Great and his son, with their seemingly military cultural jihad, spread monotheism in Mesopotamia, Sumer, Egypt, and Athens (Greece), and the clergy of that time were the greatest scientists and philosophers of their time.

== See also ==
- List of ayatollahs
- Khamenei family
