= Hadi Khamenei =

Iranian Islamic cleric and politician

Hojjat ol-Eslam Seyyed Hadi Khamenei
- هادی خامنه‌ای
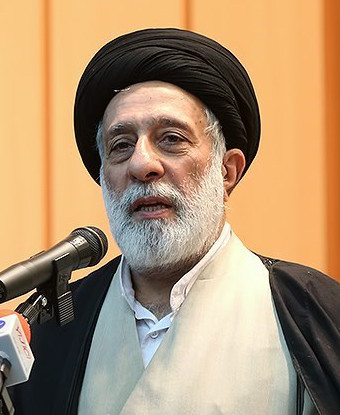
- Khamenei in 2015

Member of the Parliament of Iran
- In office 26 May 2000 – 28 May 2004
- Constituency: Tehran, Rey, Shemiranat and Eslamshahr
- Majority: 1,223,884 (41.77%)
- In office 28 May 1980 – 28 May 1992
- Constituency: Mashhad and Kalat
- Majority: 252,814 (53.5%)

Personal details
- Born: 26 January 1948 (age 78) Mashhad, Khorasan, Imperial State of Iran
- Party: Association of Combatant Clerics; Assembly of the Forces of Imam's Line
- Parent: Javad Khamenei (father)
- Relatives: Ali Khamenei (brother); Mohammad Khamenei (brother); Badri Khamenei (sister); Mojtaba Khamenei (nephew)
- Occupation: Cleric; politician; journalist

Hadi Khamenei (Persian: هادی خامنه‌ای; born 26 January 1948) is an Iranian politician, mujtahid and linguist. He is a key member of the reformist Association of Combatant Clerics, and a former deputy of the Majlis of Iran representing a district in Tehran.

== Background ==
Khamenei is the younger brother of Iran's former Supreme Leader, Ayatollah Ali Khamenei, with whom he disagreed and from whom he was allegedly estranged.

Born to Javad Khamenei, an Iranian Azerbaijani cleric, and an ethnic Persian mother from Yazd, Hadi Khamenei grew up in the 1950s, one of eight siblings, spending his free time raising birds and playing sports. He says that his father did not force him into religious studies.

== Politics ==
Hadi Khamenei became a leading reformer in the 1990s, putting him at odds with his older brother, whose official position he criticized as having too much power. Hadi Khamenei was an important adviser to reformist President Mohammad Khatami. He was a deputy minister in the 1980s.

Aside from Association of Combatant Clerics, Hadi Khamenei is Secretary-general of the Assembly of the Forces of Imam's Line.

"The political right in this country say that the supreme leader is above the law, that he can change the law, that he can decree anything he feels is right. Those powers can cause a dictatorship," he told American author Robin Wright in a 2000 interview in Tehran. Khamenei argues that the Guardian Council's vetting of candidates threatens Iranian democracy. He believes that some reformist candidates are wrongly kept from running. In 1998, the Guardian Council rejected Hadi Khamenei's candidacy for a seat in the Assembly of Experts, allegedly for having "insufficient theological qualifications."

== Attack ==
In the 1990s, Hadi Khamenei spoke at seminaries across Iran and launched a reformist newspaper to provide alternative coverage to the state media. In late 1990s, hard-line opponents of the reform movement, organized a campaign targeted at him, by physically attacking him during lectures which were critical of the hard-line leadership, (he required hospitalization for head injuries suffered at a Qom mosque), banning his newspaper, disqualifying him from running for the Assembly of Experts. On 11 February 1999, around one hundred people attacked Hadi Khamenei in Qom. The attackers fractured his skull. The mob used "stones, sticks, iron rods and shoes" to attack Khamenei. The Iranian police arrested 45 people who were suspected to be involved in the attack.

The editors of the newspapers Salam, Khordad, Sobh-i Imruz, Hamshahri, Akhbar, Iran, Etelaat, Iran News, Zan, Arya, and Kar va Kargar signed a letter condemning the attack on Hadi Khamenei. The Ministry of Islamic Guidance and Culture and the "Society of Lecturers and Researchers at Qom's Theological Seminary" also condemned the attack.

Some conservatives blamed Khamenei for the attack. The member of the Iranian Parliament Rajab Rahmani argued that Hadi Khamenei staged the attack to get attention and pity. Mohammad Mohajeri of the Kayhan newspaper suggested that Hadi Khamenei's comments were "the root cause of violence."

== Newspapers ==
Khamenei was the publisher of various newspapers, including Hayat-e-No. The Special Court for the Clergy, a tribunal appointed by the Supreme Leader, accused Hayat-e-No of "press offenses." The newspaper was accused of insulting Ruhollah Khomeini in a cartoon. In parliament, Hadi Khamenei said that he would have rather died than be accused of insulting the imam. The Special Court for Clergy temporarily banned Hayat-e No in January 2000. According to the Guardian, Hayat-e No is a reliable paper. Financial Times stated that Hayat-e No was a pro-reform daily. The paper was banned in December 2009 by the Press Supervisory Board "for working outside the regulations".

Hadi Khamenei's other newspaper, Jahan-e Islam, was shut down in 1995. The newspaper was accused of insulting Islamic beliefs and publishing false information. According to The New York Times, Jahan-e Islam was a moderate daily. However, in 1995, The New York Times characterized Jahan-e Islam, as a "hard-line Islamic newspaper."

Party political offices
New title Party established	Secretary-General of the Assembly of the Forces of Imam's Line; 1991–present	Incumbent
