= Farideh Moradkhani =

Iranian engineer and human rights activist

- فریده مرادخانی
- Born: 1971 (age 54–55)
- Occupation: Human rights activist
- Parents: Ali Tehrani (father); Badri Khamenei (mother)
- Relatives: Khamenei family

Farideh Moradkhani (Persian: فریده مرادخانی; born 1971) is an Iranian engineer and human rights activist. She is a niece of Iran's former supreme leader Ali Khamenei and a cousin of the current supreme leader Mojtaba Khamenei.

Mordkhani has been detained multiple times, including a January 2022 arrest which sent her to section 209 of Evin Prison, possibly due to praising the ousted pre-revolutionary empress Farah Diba and suggesting she be allowed to return to Iran. Mordkhani was subsequently released on bail.

On 23 November 2022, Mordkhani was arrested after going to a prosecutor's office following a summons.

On 25 November 2022, her France-based brother Mahmoud Moradkhani shared a video, in which she called on foreign governments to cut all links with Tehran's "murderous and child-killing" regime, and stated: "This regime is not loyal to any of its religious principles and does not know any laws or rules except force and maintaining its power in any possible way". She also criticized what she described as the inaction of the United Nations, that in front of "obvious and cruel oppression of the Iranian people" issued "only a few expressions of regret and short and ineffective statements".

== Family ==
Farideh Moradkhani's mother, Badri Hosseini Khamenei, is the estranged sister of Iran's former supreme leader Ali Khamenei. Farideh's father, Ali Tehrani, was a prominent opposition figure who died in October 2022.

Her brother Mahmoud Moradkhani is based in France and was the one who shared both Ms Moradkhani's video criticizing the regime and their mother's criticism of the regime in December 2022.

== See also ==
- Detainees of the Mahsa Amini protests
