= Masoud Khamenei =

Iranian Shia cleric (born 1974)

Hujjat al-Islam; Seyyed; Masoud Khamenei
- مسعود خامنه‌ای
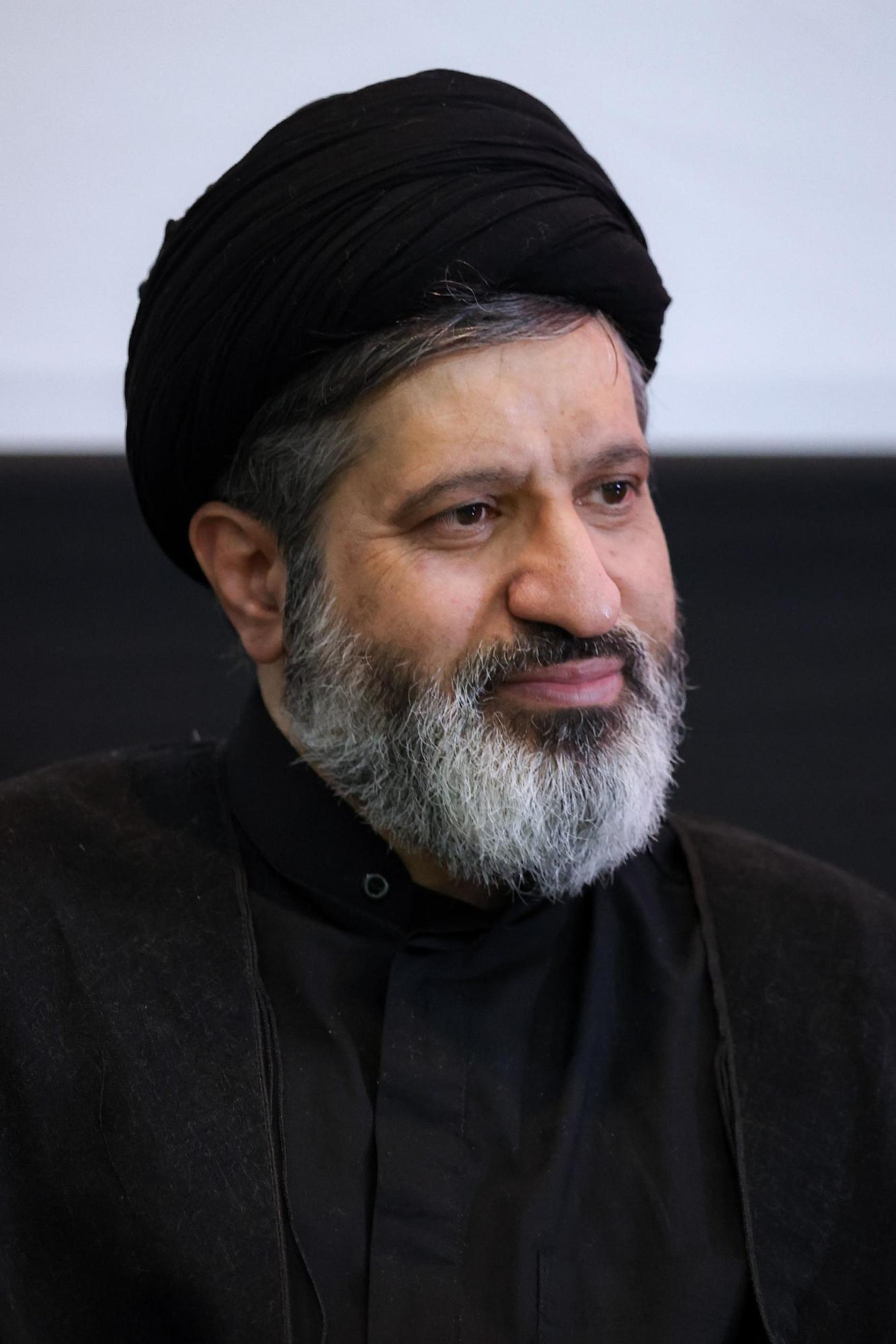
- Khamenei in 2026

Head of the Office for the Preservation of the Works of Grand Ayatollah Ali Khamenei
- Incumbent
- Assumed office 6 June 2013
- Supreme Leader: Ali Khamenei; Mojtaba Khamenei
- Preceded by: Alireza Barazesh

Personal details
- Born: Masoud Hosseini Khamenei; 1974 (age 51–52) Mashhad, Khorasan Province, Imperial State of Iran
- Parents: Ali Khamenei (father); Mansoureh Khojasteh Bagherzadeh (mother)
- Relatives: Khamenei family
- Education: Islamic Seminary of Qom

Personal life
- Education: Qom Seminary

Religious life
- Religion: Shia Islam
- Denomination: Twelver
- Jurisprudence: Usuli

Senior posting
- Teacher: Ali Khamenei; Mahmoud Hashemi Shahroudi; Mohammad-Taqi Mesbah-Yazdi; Lotfollah Safi Golpaygani; Mohammad Bagher Kharazi

Masoud Hosseini Khamenei (Note: Persian: مسعود حسینی خامنه‌ای, romanized: Masoud Hoseyni Xâmene'i) (born 1974), also known as Mohsen Khamenei (Note: Persian: محسن خامنه‌ای, romanized: Mohsan Xâmene'i) is an Iranian Twelver Shia cleric. A member of the Khamenei family, he is the third son of the second Iranian supreme leader Ali Khamenei, and the younger brother of the third and current supreme leader, Mojtaba Khamenei.

Khamenei is studying and teaching in the seminary of Qom; and is a member in Society of Seminary Teachers of Qom (Persian: جامعهٔ مدرسین حوزهٔ علمیهٔ قم). Seyyed Khamenei does not have governmental/non-governmental or formal position; moreover, his father (Ali Khamenei) has prohibited his son(s) from accepting governmental, or similar positions. According to Mehr News Agency, Masoud has the most attention out of Ali's sons in collecting the memoirs of his father and likewise in running the former Supreme Leader's activities related to his publications and preservation.

== Personal life ==
=== Family ===
Khamenei holds the title of Hojjat ol-Eslam, and is the husband of Sadiq-Kharazi's sister; likewise, he is the son-in-law of Mohsen Kharazi (Tehran's representative in the assembly of experts).

Khamenei's family are among the Iranian Sayyid families who are from Hosseini Sayyid, and their lineage is connected to the fourth Imam of Shia Islam, Ali ibn Husayn Zayn al-Abidin (Persian/Arabic: علی بن حسین، زین العابدین) (known as "Imam Sajjad"), according to "Khamenei family tree". Khamenei married the daughter of Mohsen Kharazi.

=== Wealth ===
Khamenei manages several of his family institutions. He reportedly holds over $400 million in banks in France and United Kingdom, with additional $100 million in Tehran, Iran. Khamenei also controls the sales of Renault vehicles in Iran.
