= Operation Beit ol-Moqaddas 4 =

1988 Iran–Iraq War operation

- Part of the Iran–Iraq War
Date	25 March 1988
Location	Sulaymaniyah Governorate, Iraq
Result	Iranian victory

Belligerents
Iran	(Ba'athist Iraq) Iraq

Commanders and leaders
(Iran) Mohsen Rezaee	(Ba'athist Iraq) Saddam Hussein

Casualties and losses
Unknown	5,000+ killed or wounded 498 captured Hundreds of armoured vehicles destroyed or captured (claimed by Iran)

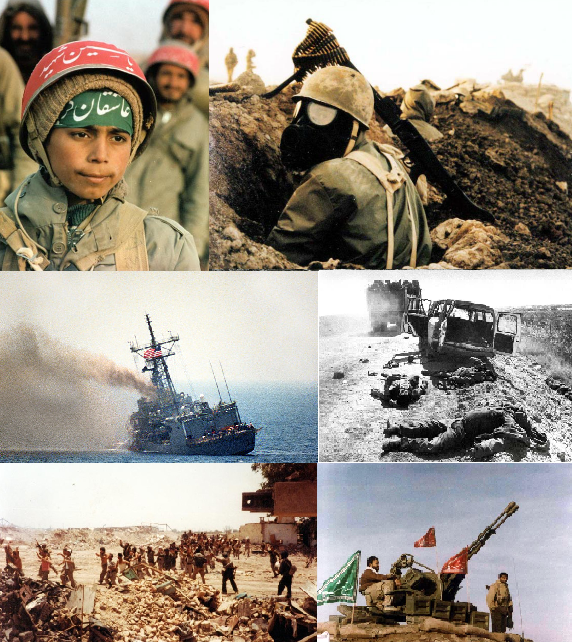
Iran-Iraq War

Operation Beit ol-Moqaddas 4 (Persian: عملیات بیت المقدس ۴) was a military operation during Iran–Iraq War which was launched by Iran on 25 March 1988. It had the codename "Ya Aba Abd-Allah al-Hussain (a.s.)" (Persian: «یااباعبدالله الحسین (ع)») was launched at the axis of Halabcheh-Shakhshemiran, under the command of Islamic Revolutionary Guard Corps, and lasted for two days. The goal of the operation was to fulfill/secure the left flank of Operation Dawn 10 area—which was considered as a sensitive area for Iraq.

== Locality ==
Halabja Province; whose part of it (axis of Halabja-Shakhshemiran) was involved of "Beitol Moqaddas-4 operation"

The operation area of Beitol Moqaddas-4 was a mountainous region, including:

- Darbandikhan lake and Shakh-Tamurzhenan (from the north)
- Martke plain; Shakh-Khashik heights and Bamoo (from the south)
- Zimkan river and Bizel mountain (from the east)
- Dam of Darbandikhan and Qashti heights (from the west)

== Results ==
Operation Beit al-Moqaddas-4 resulted in the conquering of several areas of Iraq by Iranian forces, including:

- Complete possession of ShakhShemiran heights and Shakh-Sumer
- Possession of a part of "Dasht-Tolbi" and "Bardaddkan heights"
- The killing/injuring approximately 5000 Iraqi soldiers
- The capture of 498 Iraqi soldiers
- Destruction of at least 15 tanks and 50 cars
- Additional Iranian "war spoils".

== See also ==
- Operation Beit ol-Moqaddas 3
- Operation Dawn 10
