= Mohammad Reza Mokhber Dezfouli =

Iranian politician (born 1960)

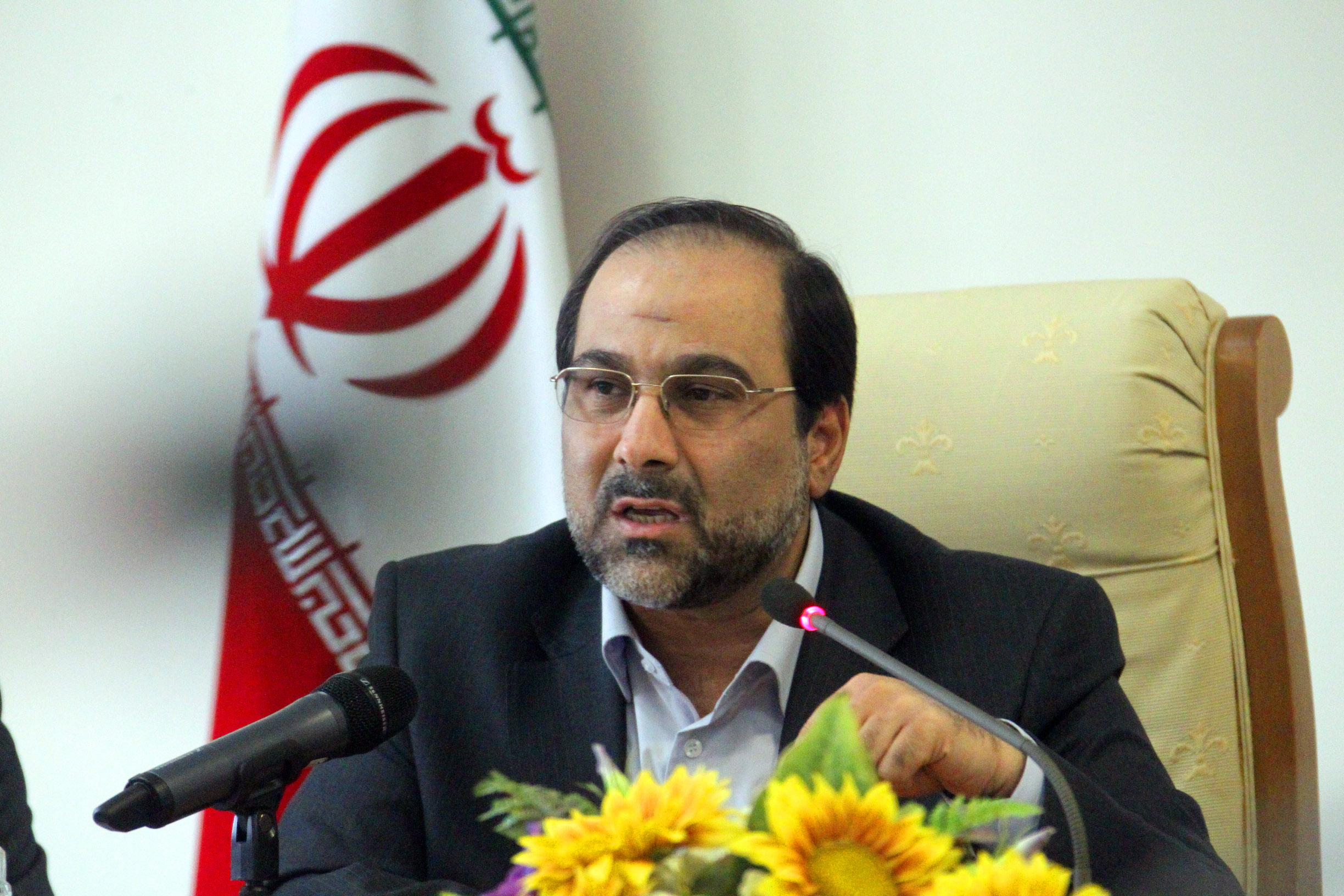

Mohammad Reza Mokhber Dezfouli (Persian: محمد رضا مخبر دزفولی, born 1960, in Dezfoul) is an Iranian politician, physician, scholar, academic, professor at the University of Tehran and the current President of the Iranian Academy of Sciences. He is also a member of the Iranian Science and Culture Hall of Fame, former Secretary of the Supreme Council of the Cultural Revolution and an associate member of the Iranian Academy of Sciences.
