= Operation Beit ol-Moqaddas 2 =

1988 offensive in the Iran-Iraq War

- Part of the Iran–Iraq War
Date	15 January – 22 January 1988 (1 week)
Location	Qomish-Sulaymaniyah, Iraq
Result	Iranian victory

Belligerents
Iraq	Iran

Casualties and losses
5,400 killed, wounded, captured	Unknown but estimated to be high

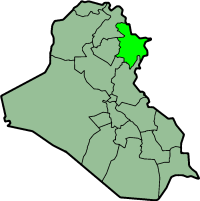
Sulaymaniyah, in Iraq; a part of which was involved during the Iran-Iraq War (in Operation Beit ol-Moqaddas 2 and 3)

Operation Beit ol-Moqaddas 2 (Persian: عملیات بیت‌المقدس ۲) was an Iranian military offensive during the Iran–Iraq War. It began on 15 January 1988 in northern Iraq, near Sulaymaniyah, with the objective of capturing strategic high ground.

The operation was launched under the code name Ya-Zahra and was planned by the Islamic Revolutionary Guard Corps (IRGC). Iranian forces attacked Iraqi positions in mountainous terrain under severe winter conditions, seeking to secure heights around Qamish and surrounding area.

== Aftermath ==
According to Iranian accounts, the operation resulted in the capture of more than 40 heights and several villages, including Oral, Golalah, Harmadan, Bein-Dora, Sheikh-Muhammad and Yulan. The same accounts reported that 5,400 Iraqi personnel were killed, wounded or captured.

== See also ==
- Operation Beit ol-Moqaddas 3
