= Azizollah Khoshvaght =

Iranian Ayatollah (1926–2013)

Ayatollah Azizollah Khoshvaght
- عزیزالله خوشوقت

Personal life
- Born: 1 October 1926 Baku, Azerbaijan SSR, Soviet Union (modern day Azerbaijan)
- Died: 22 February 2013 (aged 86) Mecca, Saudi Arabia
- Relatives: Khamenei family (in-laws)

Religious life
- Religion: Shia Islam

Senior posting
- Teacher: Muhammad Husayn Tabataba'i; Hossein Borujerdi; Ruhollah Khomeini

Azizollah Khoshvaght (Persian: عزیزالله خوشوقت; 1 October 1926 – 22 February 2013), also known as Ayatollah Khoshvaqt, was a contemporary philosopher, mystic, theologian, and faqih. He was a student of Muhammad Husayn Tabatabai, Hossein Borujerdi and Ruhollah Khomeini. He was the second child of his family family, went to seminary after passing high-school, and went to Qom after educating for five years in Lorzadeh mosque in Tehran.

Khoshvaght returned to Tehran after the end of his seminary education, and got married at the age of 33; he has 2 sons and 4 daughters. One of his daughters married Mostafa Khamenei. His parents were from Zanjan. Khoshvaqt was a prominent scholar, Faqih and a teacher of ethics.

Khoshvaght who was also well known as Aziz Khoshvaght, was also the Imam Jama'a of Imam Hassan-Mojtaba mosque in Tehran.

Azizollah Khoshvaght died at the age of 86, when he was in Mecca on 22 February 2013.

== See also ==
- Seyyed Mostafa Khamenei, Azizollah Khoshvaght's son-in-law
