= Badri Khamenei =

Sister of Iranian Supreme leader Ali Khamenei

- بدری خامنه‌ای
- Born: 1942 or 1943 (age 83–84); Mashhad, Imperial State of Iran
- Known for: Opposition to Ali Khamenei
- Spouse: Ali Tehrani
- Children: 5, including Farideh
- Father: Javad Khamenei
- Relatives: Khamenei family

Badri Sadat Khamenei (Persian: بدری سادات خامنه‌ای; born 1942 or 1943) is an Iranian dissident and estranged sister of Ali Khamenei who opposed her brother's rule in Iran.

In 1985, in the middle of the Iran–Iraq War, she left Iran with her children and fled to Iraq. She did so to join her husband, Sheik Ali Tehrani, after a one-year separation. She admitted later that 20 of her friends were arrested and executed by the regime.

In 1995, she returned to Iran, but remained alienated from Ali Khamenei until his death on February 28, 2026.

In December 2022, amid the Mahsa Amini protests, she criticized her brother's rule and his "despotic caliphate". In an open letter, she also hoped to see him overthrown. "The regime of the Islamic Republic of Khomeini and Ali Khamenei has brought nothing but suffering and oppression to Iran and Iranians," she wrote.

== Family ==
Badri Khamenei's husband was Ali Tehrani (1926–2022), an Iranian Shia Islamic theologian and writer. He fled to Iraq in 1984. After returning to Iran, he spent 10 years in prison.

Her daughter, Farideh Moradkhani, the former supreme leader's niece, was arrested in November 2022 after going to a prosecutor's office following a summons.

Her son, Mahmoud Moradkhani, is based in France and shared his sister's videos criticizing the regime and their mother's criticism of the regime in December 2022.
