= Academy of Sciences of the Islamic Republic of Iran =

Academy of Sciences of Iran
- Logo of Academy of Sciences of Iran
- Formation: February 4, 1987; 39 years ago
- Purpose: Contribute to the development of science and technology in the country Strengthen the spirit of research Promotion of scientific and cultural level
- Headquarters: Tehran, Iran
- Members: 73 (Associate members); 5 (Honorary members); 106 (Fellow members)
- President: Mohammad Reza Mokhber Dezfouli
- Key people: Mostafa Mohaghegh Damad
- Website: Academy of Sciences of Iran website

The Academy of Sciences of the Islamic Republic of Iran (Persian: فرهنگستان علوم جمهوری اسلامی ایران) was established in 1988. It is one of the four academies of the Islamic Republic of Iran. The other three are: Iranian Academy of Medical Sciences, Iranian Academy of the Arts and Academy of Persian Language and Literature.

== Organization ==
The academy consists of the president of the country as the director of the academy, a general body, the president of the academy (currently Mohammad Reza Mokhber Dezfouli), a scientific council, and the secretary of the academy.

The academy has six scientific departments including: Department of Agricultural Sciences, Department of Basic Sciences, Department of Engineering Sciences, Department of Humanities, Department of Islamic Studies, and Department of Veterinary Sciences.

== Objectives ==
Among the major objectives of the Academy of Sciences of Iran are the attainment of scientific and cultural independence, promotion of science and technology, encouragement of the spirit of research, access to the latest scientific findings and innovations through teamwork, and absorbing, encouraging and supporting eminent researchers and scholars. In order to fulfil these objectives, the academy has a range of duties including survey and analysis of the status of science, technology, education and research at the national scale; studies on experiences of other countries on the development of science, technology and its application with respect to the available facilities and potential of the country; and material and spiritual support of scholars to create scientific works among, and other duties.

== Members ==
The Academy has three types of members including Fellows, Associates and Honorary members. All members are elected by secret ballot and need the majority of votes. In 1990, the Supreme Council of Cultural Revolution selected the first fifteen fellows of the Academy. There are requirements for any of these membership types, for example fellow members have to be full professors with outstanding publications and Iranian citizenship.

== See also ==
- Science and technology in Iran
- Higher Education in Iran
- Mostafa Mohaghegh Damad, a member of the Academy
