= Operation Beit ol-Moqaddas 3 =

1988 Iran–Iraq War operation

- Part of the Iran–Iraq War
Date	14 March 1988
Location	Sulaymaniyah Governorate, Iraq
Result	Inconclusive: Iran claimed to have penetrated 20 km (12 mi) into Iraqi territory

Belligerents
Iran	Iraq

Casualties and losses
Unknown	1,100 casualties (Iranian claim)

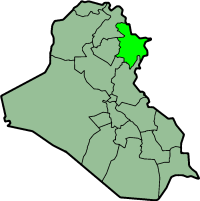
Sulaymaniyah, in Iraq; whose a part of it was involved during Iran-Iraq War (in Operation Beit ol-Moqaddas 3)

Operation Beit ol-Moqaddas 3 (Persian: عملیات بیت المقدس 3) was a military operation during the Iran–Iraq War, which was launched on 14 March 1988 by Iran. Its code name was "Ya Mousa ibn Jafar" (Persian: یاموسی‌بن‌جعفر). The mission's goal was to capture the heights of (the north of) Sulaymaniyah, and also respond the Iraqi bombardment of residential areas in Sulaymaniyah Governorate. Iranian authorities claimed to have penetrated 20 km (12 mi) into Iraqi territory.

Iranian newspapers claimed that the command of Najaf quarters, Ground Forces of the Army of the Guardians of the Islamic Revolution attacked Iraqi forces (with the support of Islamic Republic of Iran Army Aviation) in the depth of 56 km (35 mi) of Iraq land, and struck Iraqi locations/bases; and possessed the main height of Goochar and Halgan—in the first hours of the operation.

Iranian newspapers claimed that at the end of the mentioned operation, the casualties of Iraqis were over 1,100 individuals, and more than 80 Iraqi forces were captured by Iran.

== See also ==
- Operation Beit ol-Moqaddas
- Operation Beit ol-Moqaddas 2
