= Pronouncing Dictionary of Proper Names =

English pronouncing dictionary

- 2nd ed. cover
- Editor: John K. Bollard
- Language: English
- Subject: English pronunciation
- Genre: Dictionary
- Published: 1993 (1st ed.); 1997 (2nd ed.)
- Publisher: Omnigraphics

The Pronouncing Dictionary of Proper Names (PDPN) is a pronouncing dictionary of proper nouns edited by John K. Bollard and first published by Omnigraphics in 1993.

The full title of the dictionary is "Pronouncing Dictionary of Proper Names. Pronunciations for more than 23,000 Proper Names, Selected for Currency, Frequency, or Difficulty of Pronunciation, Including Places Names; Given Names; Names of Famous Individuals; Cultural, Literary, and Historical Names; Mythological Names; Names of Peoples and Tribes; Company Names and Product Names; with Pronunciations Transcribed into the International Phonetic Alphabet and a Simplified Phonetic Respelling; and Including an Explanatory Introduction." Edited by John K. Bollard alongside associate editors, the dictionary was first published by Omnigraphics in 1993, with a second edition published in 1997.

== Contents ==
=== Introduction ===
The PDPN provides a 23-page explanatory introduction detailing the systems of pronunciation used in the dictionary with prose and charts. It is essentially a brief course in the linguistics of pronunciation.

=== Entries ===
The PDPN itself counts "more than 23,000" entries for its first edition, plus 5,000 entries for its second edition. The dictionary provides English-language pronunciations of exclusively proper nouns for a broad range of subjects; its lengthy subtitle described by reviewer Laurence Urdang as "the most succinct way to describe the contents." The layout for each page consists of three columns:

1. the headword in bold, with its description right below in italics;
2. the simplified pronunciation respelling for the headword;
3. and the phonetic transcription in the International Phonetic Alphabet (IPA).

For example, the following entry is given for the city of Ouagadougou, Burkina Faso:

**Ouagadougou**
city, Burkina Faso	WAHG-uh-DO̅O̅-go̅o̅	ˌwɑgəˈduːguː

Regional pronunciations are distinguished—a pound sign (£) for British English and a dollar sign ($) for American English—as well as those which differ by country or function. The style of transcription used in the IPA is broad rather than narrow, providing only the rudiments needed to reproduce the sound of each word. The simplified respelling is intended for those unversed in the numerous symbols of the IPA, utilizing basic letters of the alphabet alongside macrons for some vowels. At the bottom of each page is a footer with a key to the simplified pronunciation and foreign sounds.

== Reception ==
Library Journal listed the PDPN among the "best reference sources of 1993" for being "an up-to-date, reliable guide" to pronunciation, while American Libraries counted it among the "outstanding reference resources" of 1994. Reviewers praised the PDPN's extensive coverage, as well as its accessibility for specialists and non-specialists alike; Robert Fradkin concluded it to be "the most comprehensive for a maximally broad audience" and it is recommended in Garner's Modern English Usage as "an excellent guide to proper nouns".

Terese Thonus, in her review, called the dictionary an "admirable instructor" on correct pronunciation, although gave minor criticism to some Portuguese entries and notable omissions. Edward Callary considered the PDPN in his review to have "got the pronunciations exactly right" despite some omissions of variant pronunciations. On the other hand, Urdang criticized what he saw as the inclusion of irrelevant variant pronunciations, such as dialectal US pronunciations for British towns. He furthermore pointed out inconsistent formatting of some entries and disagreeable pronunciations of a few personal names. Nevertheless, Urdang noted these were "detailed, petty matters of individual interpretation" and deemed the PDPN "indispensable" in acceptable pronunciation.
