= Operation Dawn 10 =

1988 Iranian offensive of the Iran–Iraq War

- Part of the Iran–Iraq War
Date	15 March 1988
Location	Sulaymaniyah Governorate, Iraq
Result	Iranian victory
Territorial changes	Iran captured 1,200 square kilometres of Iraqi territory, including 3 towns and 100+ villages

Belligerents
Iraq	Iran; Supported by: (Kurdistan Region) Peshmerga

Commanders and leaders
(Ba'athist Iraq) Saddam Hussein (Ba'athist Iraq) Kokeb Mohammad Amin (Ba'athist Iraq) Abdul-Wahid Shannan ar-Ribat (Ba'athist Iraq) Hisham Fakhri	(Iran) Ayatollah Khomeni (Iran) Mohsen Rezaee (Iran) Ali Sayad Shirazi (Iran) Ali Shamkhani (Iran) Yahya Rahim Safavi (Kurdistan Region) Masoud Barzani

Strength
Unknown	Unknown

Casualties and losses
10,000+ killed or wounded 5,440 captured 270 tanks destroyed	3,000+ killed

Operation Dawn-10 or Walfajr-10 (Persian: عملیات والفجر ۱۰) was an offensive operation launched by Iran against Iraq on March 15, 1988, near the end of the Iran–Iraq War. Led by the Pasdaran and supported by some regular army forces, the five-phase operation marked a shift in Iranian focus from southern to northern Iraq.

== The battle ==
Launched with the code of "Ya Rasūl Allāh (s)" (Persian: (یا رسول الله (ص) (likewise "Ya Muhammad ibn Abdullah"), Operation Dawn-10 was executed on the west heights overlooking Darbandikhan Lake in the Sulaymaniyah Governorate in Iraq with the operational goal of preparing a full-on assault on the Darbandikhan Dam. Iranian forces quickly encircled their main objectives with ease, and the Iraqis did not have the time to reinforce the threatened area. The siege caught them by surprise, as they were expecting an attack from the southern front, from where Iran mainly operated. Roughly 10,000 Iraqi troops were killed or wounded, while some 5,440 more were captured. Iraq also lost hundreds of tanks, armoured vehicles, and equipment whereas Iran sustained many fewer losses.

== Aftermath ==
Overall, the operation led to the capture of three towns and around 100 villages in the 1,200-square-kilometer operational area, including Halabja, Kharmal, Biareh, and Tawileh. Iran also claimed that the town of Nosud was retaken from Iraqi forces. The offensive forced Iraq to divert important divisions from the south to the northern Iraqi mountains, disrupting the overall war effort.

To punish Kurds involved in the battle, Saddam ordered the Iraqi military to chemically bombard Halabja the next day, killing thousands of civilians and destroying the town.

== See also ==
- Operation Beit ol-Moqaddas 4
- Halabja massacre
