= Kharazia =

Kharazia (Abkhaz: Харазиа) is an Abkhazian surname. Notable people with the surname include:

- Adgur Kharazia (fl. 2004), Abkhazian politician
- Vadim Kharazia (fl. 2015), Abkhazian politician
