= Mojtaba Khamenei =

Supreme Leader of Iran since 2026

Ayatollah; Seyyed; Mojtaba Khamenei
- مجتبی خامنه‌ای
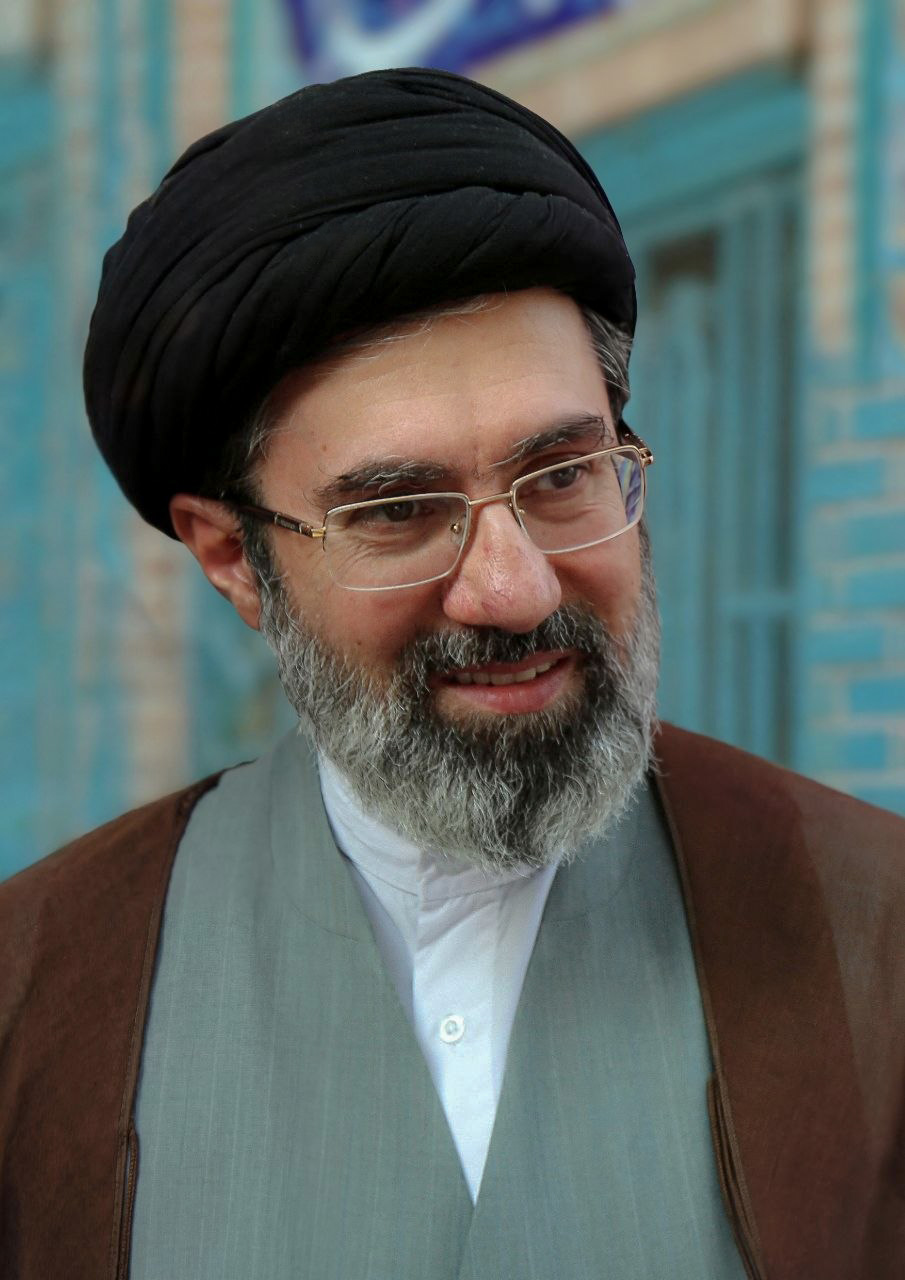

Supreme Leader of Iran
- Incumbent
- Assumed office 8 March 2026
- President: Masoud Pezeshkian
- Preceded by: Ali Khamenei (Note: Between Ali Khamenei's death on 28 February and Mojtaba Khamenei's election on 8 March, the Interim Leadership Council was tasked with handling the duties of the supreme leader.)

Vakil of the Office of the Supreme Leader (Note: Per Shia Islamic tradition, an Ayatollah-ranked cleric is to establish an office for addressing lay religious questions and organizing alms, with their son traditionally being designated to lead said office as a wakil. The Office of Foreign Assets Control claims he represented "the Supreme Leader in an official capacity despite never being elected or appointed to a government position aside from work in the office of his father". According to the New York Times, Khamenei coordinated military and intelligence operations from his father's office.)
- In office 21 August 2008 (Note: This was the earliest alleged date he served in this position. The actual date of his appointment is not known.) – 28 February 2026
- Supreme Leader: Ali Khamenei
- Chief of Staff: Mohammad Mohammadi Golpayegani
- Preceded by: Position established
- Succeeded by: Vacant

Personal details
- Born: Mojtaba Hosseini Khamenei; 20 February / March 1970 Mashhad, Iran
- Party: Independent
- Other political affiliations: Front of Islamic Revolution Stability (patron)
- Spouse: Zahra Haddad-Adel (m. 1999; died 2026)
- Children: 3
- Parents: Ali Khamenei (father); Mansoureh Khojasteh Bagherzadeh (mother)
- Relatives: Khamenei family
- Education: Qom Seminary
- Website: rahbar.ir

Military service
- Allegiance: Iran
- Branch/service: Islamic Revolutionary Guard Corps
- Years of service: 1987–1988 (Ground Forces); 2009–2026 (Basij)
- Unit: 27th Mohammad Rasulullah Division
- Commands: Basij (de facto); Intelligence Organization (de facto); Intelligence Protection Organization general staff (de facto)
- Battles/wars: Iran–Iraq War; Operation Beit ol-Moqaddas 2; Operation Beit ol-Moqaddas 4; Operation Dawn 10; Operation Mersad; 2026 Iran war (WIA)

Religious life
- Religion: Islam
- Denomination: Twelver Shi'a
- Jurisprudence: Ja'fari
- Creed: Usuli

Mojtaba Hosseini Khamenei (Note: Iranian Persian: مجتبی حسینی خامنه‌ای, romanized: Mojtabâ Hoseyni Xâmene'i, Iranian Persian pronunciation: [modʒtʰæˈbɒː hosejˈniː xɒːmeneˈʔiː].) (born c. 20 February 1970 to 20 March 1970) is an Iranian politician and Shia cleric who has served as the supreme leader of Iran since 2026. A member of the Khamenei family and the second son of second supreme leader Ali Khamenei, he previously served as Vakil of the Supreme Leader during his father's rule from 2008 to 2026.

Born in Mashhad, Khamenei was raised in a conservative religious household, and graduated from high school in Tehran. He then studied Islamic theology under the guidance of his father and Mahmoud Hashemi Shahroudi. He joined the Islamic Revolutionary Guard Corps (IRGC) in 1987 and served in the Iran–Iraq War. In 1989, he began studying in Qom to become a cleric, and later joined the Qom Seminary as a theology teacher. He took control of the Basij paramilitary volunteer militia in 2009.

Western analysts long considered Khamenei a likely candidate to replace his father as Supreme Leader, despite some unverified reports that Ali Khamenei had opposed his accession. Following his father's assassination during the 2026 Iran war, Khamenei was elected the third supreme leader by the Assembly of Experts. Khamenei was injured in the airstrike that killed his father and has remained absent from public view since his appointment, causing confusion over his fate. The US has placed a $10 million bounty via the Rewards for Justice Program for information on him.

In political ideology and jurisprudence, Khamenei is considered to be more hardline than his father and has close ties to some of the "most ideologically extremist clerics" according to a report from the Atlantic Council, a pro-NATO think tank.

== Early life and education ==
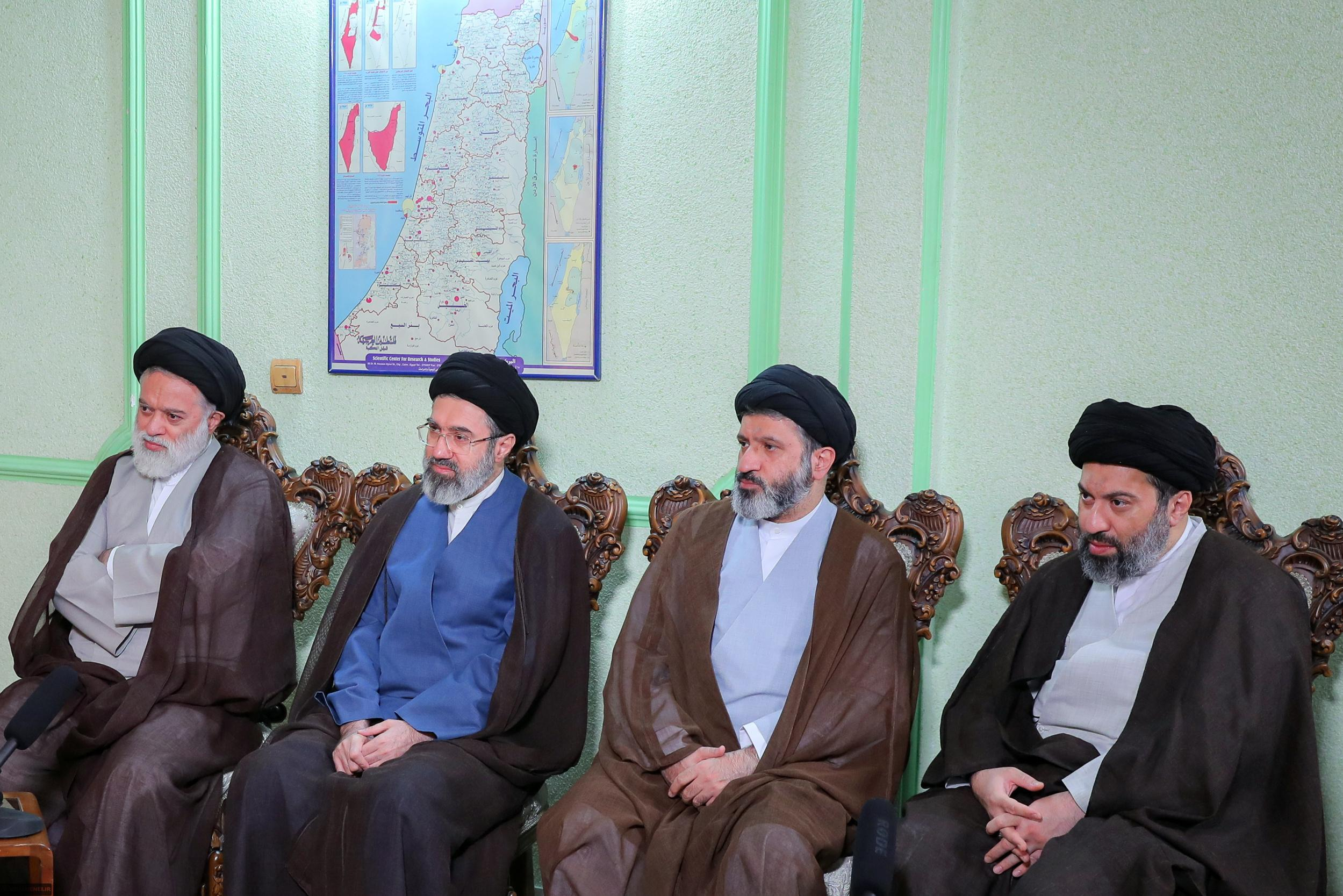
Khamenei (second from left) in 2024 with his three brothers, from left to right: Mostafa, Masoud, and Meysam

Mojtaba Hosseini Khamenei was born on 8 September 1969 in Mashhad as the second child of Ali Khamenei and Mansoureh Khojasteh Bagherzadeh. He was named after Navvab Safavi (born Mojtaba Mir-Lohi), a radical Shia cleric about whom Ali Khamenei had said that he "first kindled the fire of revolutionary Islam in my heart." His five siblings are Mostafa, his elder brother, Masoud and Meysam, his younger brothers, and Boshra and Hoda, his younger sisters. His paternal grandfather, Javad Khamenei, was a Twelver Shia cleric and scholar.

Khamenei has Persian ancestry, but to a lesser extent, Azerbaijani Turk ancestry, with his Azeri roots being traced back to Khamaneh, a small town in East Azerbaijan where his surname originated from, and he also has distant roots from Tafresh. His family traces its lineage to Husayn ibn Ali, the son of Ali, the first Shia Imam, and the maternal grandson of the Islamic prophet Muhammad, hence Khamenei's middle name is Hosseini (spelled Husayni in Arabic; meaning "descendant of Husayn").

Khamenei was raised in a conservative religious household, where he encountered Islamic learning and revolutionary ideas from a young age. After graduating from Alavi high school in Tehran, he studied Islamic theology. His early teachers included his own father and Ayatollah Mahmoud Hashemi Shahroudi. In 1989, Khamenei began his studies in Qom to become a cleric. Mohammad-Taqi Mesbah-Yazdi, Ayatollah Lotfollah Safi Golpaygani and Mohammad Bagher Kharazi were among his teachers there. Khamenei has completed specialized studies in psychology and psychoanalysis.

== Scholarly career ==
Khamenei taught theology in the Qom Seminary; from 2004 he taught Kharij-e Fiqh (advanced jurisprudence) courses for approximately two decades and was considered the instructor of one of the most heavily attended advanced seminary classes. The Dars-e Kharij is the highest level of jurisprudential instruction and a prerequisite for attaining the rank of mujtahid, a scholar qualified to perform independent legal reasoning (ijtihad) in Islamic law.

== Early political career ==
Khamenei first joined the Islamic Revolutionary Guards Corps (IRGC) around 1987 after finishing high school at age 17. He was part of the Habib bin Muzahir Battalion, and he served together with Qasem Soleimani, Hossein Hamadani and Hossein Taeb, who would later command the IRGC. He took part in several operations of the Iran–Iraq War, including Operation Beit ol-Moqaddas 2, Operation Dawn 10 and Operation Mersad.

In 2009, it was reported that Khamenei had assumed leadership of the Basij, one of five branches of the IRGC. Reformist critics blamed him for suppressing the protests over the 2009 presidential election. Despite having control over the Basij, The Guardian argued in 2009 that "[t]he strength of Mojtaba's following has not been demonstrated", and that he "by no means has the theological status" to rise to Supreme Leader.

In 2023, Iran International published leaked reports from the IRGC, revealing that Khamenei effectively controlled the Basij and that he exercised significant influence over the assignment and dismissal of personnel in the Intelligence Protection Organization.

== Supreme Leadership (2026–present) ==
=== Background ===
Several Western analysts considered Khamenei a possible successor to his father, and multiple Western sources considered him Ali Khamenei's heir apparent. In 2014, as well as 2025, it was reported that Ali's successor was deemed to have been decided but not disclosed publicly. Prior to his death, Ali had not publicly discussed his replacement, and some reports said that he opposed Mojtaba succeeding him; US intelligence indicated that Ali considered Mojtaba unintelligent and unqualified.

Some analysts considered Mojtaba Khamenei's potential accession as presenting a problem, as the Supreme Leader needs to be elected by the Assembly of Experts, though The Guardian noted that the first Supreme Leader, Ruhollah Khomeini, exerted a strong influence in favour of the choice of Ali Khamenei. The Iranian constitution dictates the adherence to Khomeini's interpretation of the principle of Guardianship of the Islamic Jurist (velayat-e faqih). According to this interpretation, the Supreme Leader must be a mujtahid, capable of interpreting Sharia law. Khamenei is a hojjatoleslam (a rank below that of ayatollah).

During the presidency of Ebrahim Raisi, Khamenei was one of the clerics speculated as a possible successor as supreme leader. However, he was considered unlikely to succeed his father. The Middle East Institute opined that Khamenei appointing his own son as successor would cause conflict within the Iranian political and religious leadership, as it would be a sign that the revolutionary Islamic system of government had evolved to dynastic rule.

=== Election ===
After his father's assassination in the 2026 Iran war, Khamenei was considered a likely candidate to replace him as Supreme Leader. The Daily Telegraph reported that over the years Khamenei had built a "loyalty structure that spanned the country", at the apex of which stood the IRGC, and it would "legitimise his leadership when the moment came". According to Iran International, the IRGC pressured the Assembly of Experts to elect Khamenei. There was strong opposition from some members of the council, including eight who stated that they would boycott an online electoral meeting planned for 5 March. Questions regarding the voting process itself also arose; the assembly building had been destroyed prior to the vote, and unlike the election of Ali Khamenei, which followed a period of relative tranquility allowing multiple meetings on the issue, the election of Mojtaba occurred in the absence of such stability. On 8 March, the Assembly of Experts announced that Mojtaba was elected Supreme Leader in a "unanimous vote".

On 5 March, US president Donald Trump said that Khamenei's election would be "unacceptable" and that he had to be involved in the selection of Iran's next leader. Following his election, Trump said that he was "disappointed" by the selection, and that Khamenei "cannot live in peace". Israel said it considered Khamenei, like his father, a target for assassination. According to an Iran International analysis, Khamenei's election marked the completion of the Islamic Republic's shift away from public backing. Analysts and scholars described it as an indication that Iran had returned to hereditary rule after abandoning it following the 1979 revolution. Many Iranian social media users mocked the appointment, and Iranian protesters chanted "Death to Mojtaba" from their homes.

=== Iran war ===
On 17 March, a senior Iranian official stated that Khamenei had rejected de-escalation proposals conveyed by intermediaries. According to the official, Khamenei demanded that the US and Israel be "brought to their knees".

==== Absence and speculation ====
Khamenei was injured in the airstrike that killed his father, wife, and other family members, and his appointment was followed by a prolonged absence from public view; no confirmed footage of him has been released since the appointment. Supposed recent photographs of Khamenei distributed by the Iranian government were manipulated with artificial intelligence, according to Shayan Sardarizadeh, a senior journalist with BBC Verify. His absence caused widespread confusion over the extent of the injuries he sustained during the attack on the residence of the Supreme Leader on 28 February. The Media Line reported that "the survival of Mojtaba Khamenei remains a subject of considerable speculation".

In a statement to ISNA, Yousouf, son of President Masoud Pezeshkian, said that Khamenei was "safe and sound", and Iranian officials said that he had sustained minor injuries to the face and foot. The Daily Telegraph obtained a recording of an address from Mazaher Hosseini, Ali Khamenei's chief of protocol, to the IRGC and senior clerics. Hosseini said that the younger Khamenei survived the airstrike because he had gone outside for a walk several minutes before Israel struck the Supreme Leader's compound. According to Hosseini, Khamenei suffered a minor leg injury. In contrast, Voice of Emirates reported that Khamenei's health had severely deteriorated, that he had sustained life-threatening lacerations and fractures to his abdomen and legs, and had entered a semi-comatose state; his treatment including being put on a ventilator in the intensive care unit of Sina Hospital. On 15 March, Al-Jarida reported that Khamenei had been transferred to Moscow for treatment in an operation ordered by Russian president Vladimir Putin.

An Iranian official told The Telegraph: "No one knows anything about Mojtaba, whether he is alive or dead or how badly injured. We are all just told that he's injured. He has no control over the war because he is not here. The majority of commanders, or more correctly, all commanders, have no news about him." The reports prompted a former Iranian diplomat to question why he was chosen as Supreme Leader, and several senior Iranian clerics called for the return of the Interim Leadership Council. The Washington Post says that Khamenei is believed to be "badly wounded." According to a report in The Times, Khamenei is unconscious and has been receiving medical treatments for a "severe" medical condition in Qom.

Khamenei did not attend the memorial ceremony for his wife in Tehran on 1 July. The New York Times reported that he had told two government officials he wanted to attend his father's burial in Mashhad on 9 July. While his brothers participated in the ceremonies, Khamenei was absent from all public funeral events and the burial ceremony.

==== Written statements ====
On 12 March, four days after his appointment, a written message attributed to Khamenei—containing no video or audio—was read on state television, promising revenge for the "martyrs". According to The Media Line, the message contained a number of errors in typography and clerical language, and "a knowledgeable source in Tehran" said it had been dictated by the IRGC and released under Khamenei's name. Al-Jarida reported that Ali Larijani, Secretary of the Supreme National Security Council, was likely the actual author, as the message was similar to those Larijani had released in preceding days.

A second message attributed to Khamenei, read on state television on 16 March, asked government officials appointed by his father to remain in their posts, a third message, read on 18 March, vowed to avenge Larijani's assassination, and a fourth message, read on 20 March, denied that Iran was involved in the recent attacks on Turkey and Oman. Following the 2026 Iran war ceasefire, a written statement was read saying to stop firing for the time being, with another message promising revenge.

On 6 April, an AI-generated video of Khamenei was released by Iranian state-run media. On 18 April, a message attributed to Khamenei said that the Iranian navy was ready to inflict "new bitter defeats" on enemies. On 18 June, Khamenei issued a written statement, saying that he endorsed the Islamabad Memorandum to end the 2026 Iran war despite misgivings.

== Political and religious views ==
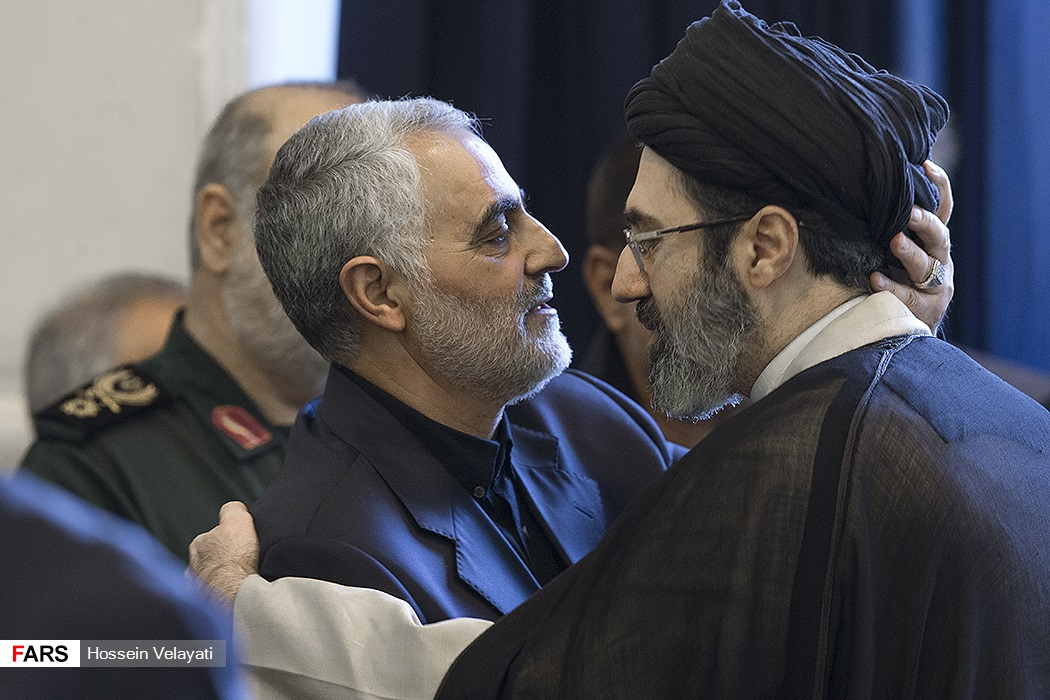
Khamenei (right) with Qasem Soleimani at a 2017 ceremony commemorating the father of Soleimani, in Mosalla, Tehran

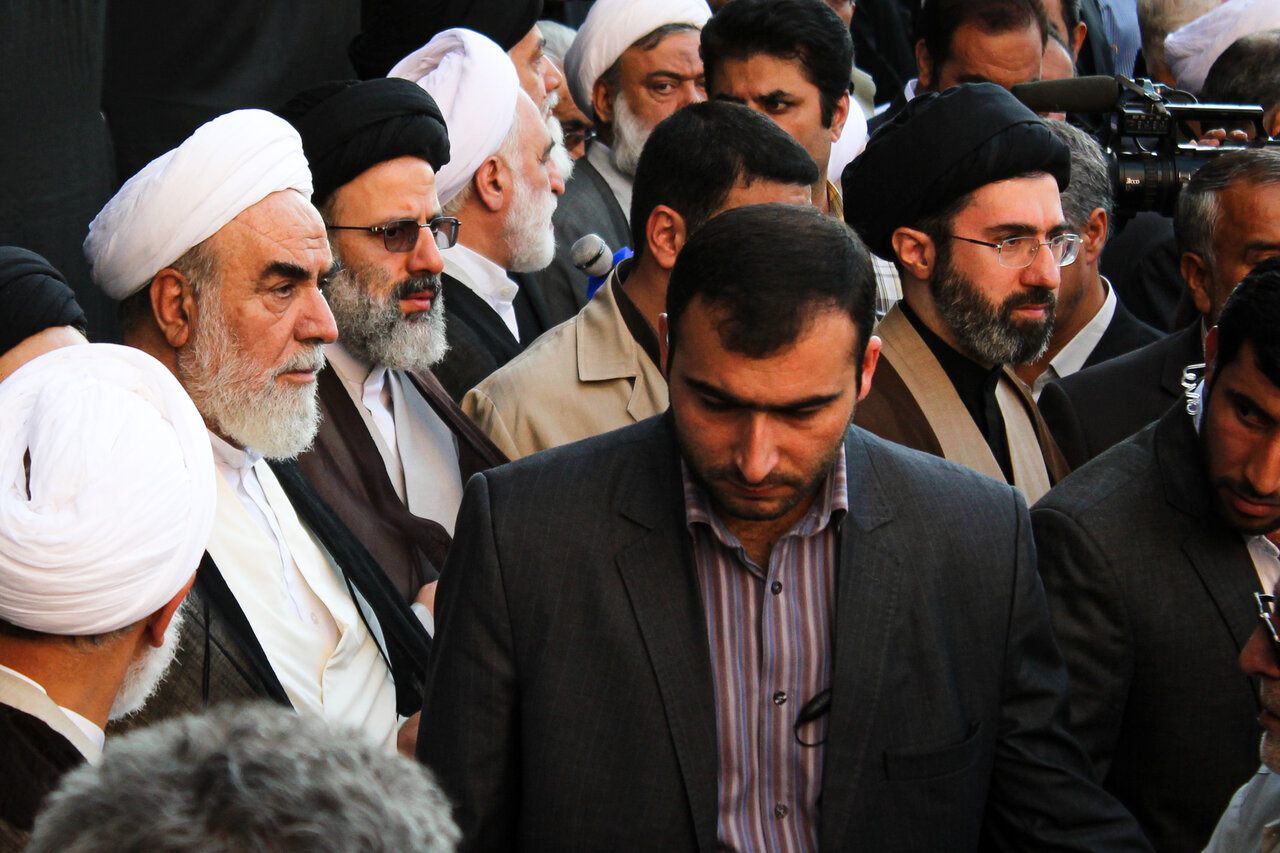
Mojtaba Khamenei (right) in front of former president Ebrahim Raisi (center-left)

Analysts consider Khamenei to be aligned with the ultraconservatives among the Iranian principlists. He is a devotee of and heavily informed by the views of Taqi Yazdi, being a patron of Yazdi's party, the Front for Islamic Revolution Stability. According to the Atlantic Council, he is closely associated with those who hold fundamentalist and Mahdist views. Mehmet Ozalp wrote in The Conversation that Khamenei "[might] lean more heavily on the might of the IRGC" than his father did. The Telegraph predicted that he would view the United States as "implacable enemy", would likely escalate the conflict, and was unlikely to make any compromises. In The Atlantic, Karim Sadjadpour presented him as "more radical" than his father, who, for instance, would read Western literature while Mojtaba has mostly limited himself to Islamic texts and the poetry of Hafez. The Independent quoted Jaber Rajabi, a former classmate of Khamenei and foreign policy adviser to President Mahmoud Ahmadinejad, as saying that Khamenei is more ruthless than his father and "a better liar". Rajabi also stated that Khamenei does not value human life and is "not afraid to kill thousands of people."

In a partisan documentary, Khamenei is portrayed as an "ethics-oriented jurist" and a "professor of human sciences" with extensive knowledge of religious texts; he is also described as familiar with various fields including modern technology, military science, security affairs, political theory, and matters related to state administration. One source who knew him as a student described Khamenei as focused on the end of the world and apocalyptic questions, that he thought that Iran had a mission from God to bring about the end of the world, and that he had a role in accelerating the process.

=== Ties within the IRGC ===
Khamenei was an influential figure in his father's inner circle, cultivating deep ties to the IRGC. He used the Basij to crack down on peaceful protesters during the Iranian Green Movement of 2009. Before becoming Supreme Leader, local and foreign-based democracy activists had linked Khamenei to the violent suppression of Iranian protesters. According to Patrick Wintour of The Guardian, Khamenei was viewed as someone who "would put the IRGC fully at the helm of Iranian politics", sidelining spiritual and moderate political leadership. Despite the successive deaths of Iranian leaders during the 2026 Iran war, analysts noted the IRGC's constant activity and increasing influence within Iran's political structure under Khamenei.

=== Support for Ahmadinejad ===
Khamenei was affiliated with Iranian president Mahmoud Ahmadinejad, and supported Ahmadinejad in the 2005 and 2009 presidential elections. Journalists stated that Khamenei may "have played a leading role in orchestrating" Ahmadinejad's electoral victory in 2009, and he was speculated to have been instrumental in orchestrating the crackdown against anti-government protesters in June 2009.

During the 2009 protests, protesters accused Ali Khamenei of working to facilitate Mojtaba's succession. The slogan "Mojtaba may you die, and not see the leadership" or "Mojtaba die, may you not take the leadership" was chanted by protesters on 9 July in Tehran. In an open letter, Mehdi Karroubi, a reformist candidate in the 2009 election, accused Khamenei of conspiring to rig the election in Ahmadinejad's favor. In 2012, Ahmadinejad accused Khamenei of embezzling from the state treasury.

In February 2021, Independent Persian claimed that Ahmadinejad met with Mojtaba Khamenei, who reportedly supported both his views and his candidacy in the 2021 presidential election. Mehdi Fazaili denied the meeting.

== Personal life ==
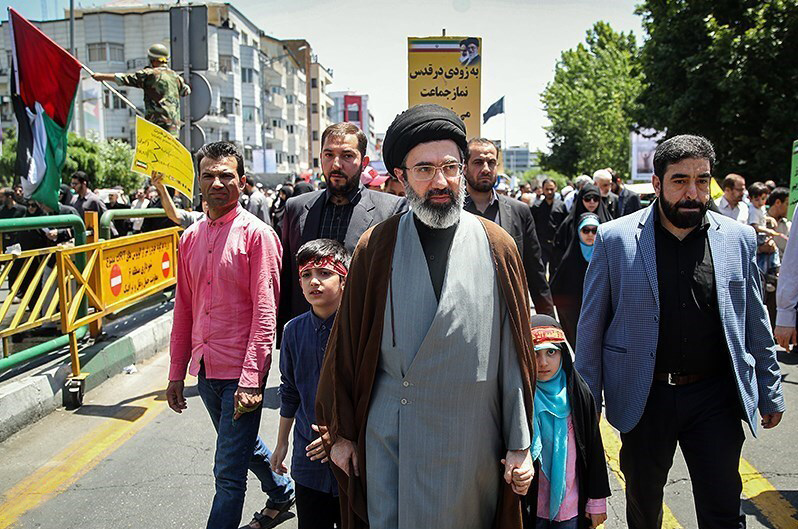
Mojtaba Khamenei and his children on Quds Day in 2018

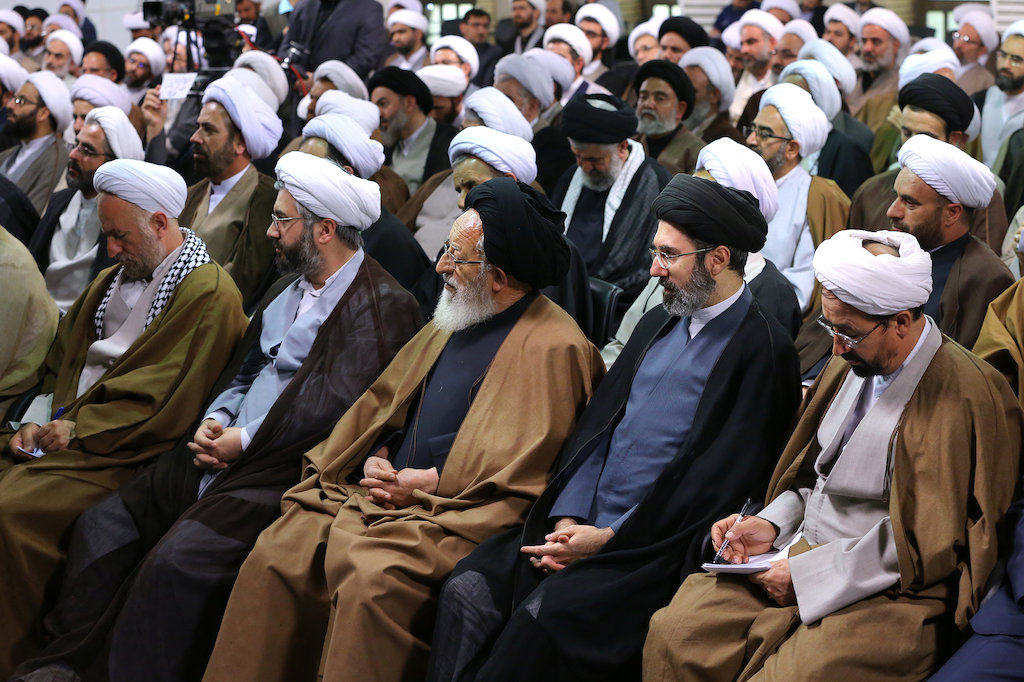
Mojtaba Khamenei and other members of the Qom Seminary, March 2016

He married Zahra Haddad-Adel, a daughter of the ultraconservative politician and writer Gholam-Ali Haddad-Adel, in 1999. Their first child was born in 2007. Their first son is Mohamed Amin, who was followed by their daughter, Fatemeh Sadat, and their second son, Mohammad Bagher. There were reports that due to fertility issues, the couple travelled to the United Kingdom four times, staying at Wellington and Cromwell Hospitals for treatment, and that the child was delivered in Iran.

Khamenei's father, wife and one of his sisters were killed at the onset of the 2026 Iran war.

In addition to his native Persian, he is fluent in Arabic and English.

=== Health and public silence ===
Khamenei had not given public lectures, Friday sermons, or political addresses by March 2026 – to the point that many Iranians have not heard his voice, despite knowing for years that he was a rising power within the theocratic establishment. On 6 April, The Times reported diplomatic correspondence based on US and Israeli intelligence asserting that Khamenei is unconscious and has been receiving medical treatments for a "severe" medical condition.

Meanwhile, Iranian deputy foreign minister Saeed Khatibzadeh claimed that Khamenei "is well and in full health, is present in his office, and is in fact in control of everything." Other Iranian officials claim that he is taking part in meetings and making decisions about important issues, including the war, while an Iranian official was quoted as saying that he suffered a leg injury only.

=== Wealth ===
Khamenei is widely believed to control significant financial assets in banks such as Bank Ayandeh.

A year-long investigation by Bloomberg, citing assessments from people familiar with the matter, reported in January 2026 that Khamenei is linked to an offshore financial network used to hold and move assets outside Iran. The reported holdings include high-value real estate in London and Dubai, as well as interests connected to shipping, banking relationships, and hospitality assets in Europe. According to the investigation, the assets were generally not held in Khamenei's name but structured through intermediaries and layered corporate entities across multiple jurisdictions. Some of these assets have since been sold or restructured amid increased scrutiny.

Bloomberg identified Ali Ansari, an Iranian businessman sanctioned by the United Kingdom, as a central alleged facilitator in the network. Property records and corporate filings reportedly link Ansari and associated companies to several London properties, including residences on The Bishops Avenue, and to hotel ownership and management entities in Germany and other countries. Ansari has denied any financial or personal relationship with Khamenei and has stated that he intends to challenge the UK sanctions.

The investigations further alleged that funds linked to the network largely originated from Iranian oil revenues and were routed through financial institutions in multiple jurisdictions, despite international sanctions imposed on Mojtaba Khamenei in 2019.

On 14 January 2026, during the 2025–2026 Iranian protests, US Treasury Department secretary Scott Bessent announced that "millions and tens of millions" of dollars have been wired by Iran's leaders to financial institutions worldwide, and Israel's Channel 14 reported that $1.5 billion in cryptocurrency had been sent to an account in Dubai with the involvement of Khamenei (who alone sent approximately $328 million).

==== Sanctions ====
In 2019, Khamenei was placed under US sanctions for acting in place of the Supreme Leader without ever being elected or appointed to any official position and for working closely with the commander of the Quds Force, responsible for "covert operations including lethal aid, intelligence, financing, and training" of Hezbollah, Hamas, Palestinian Islamic Jihad, Popular Mobilization Forces Iraq and others; and for fostering close ties with the Basij paramilitary group as well as advancing "his father's destabilizing regional ambitions and oppressive domestic objectives".

== Notes ==
Political offices
Preceded by Ali Khamenei	Supreme Leader of Iran; 2026–present	Incumbent
