= VOA Pronunciation Guide =

Online pronunciation reference system

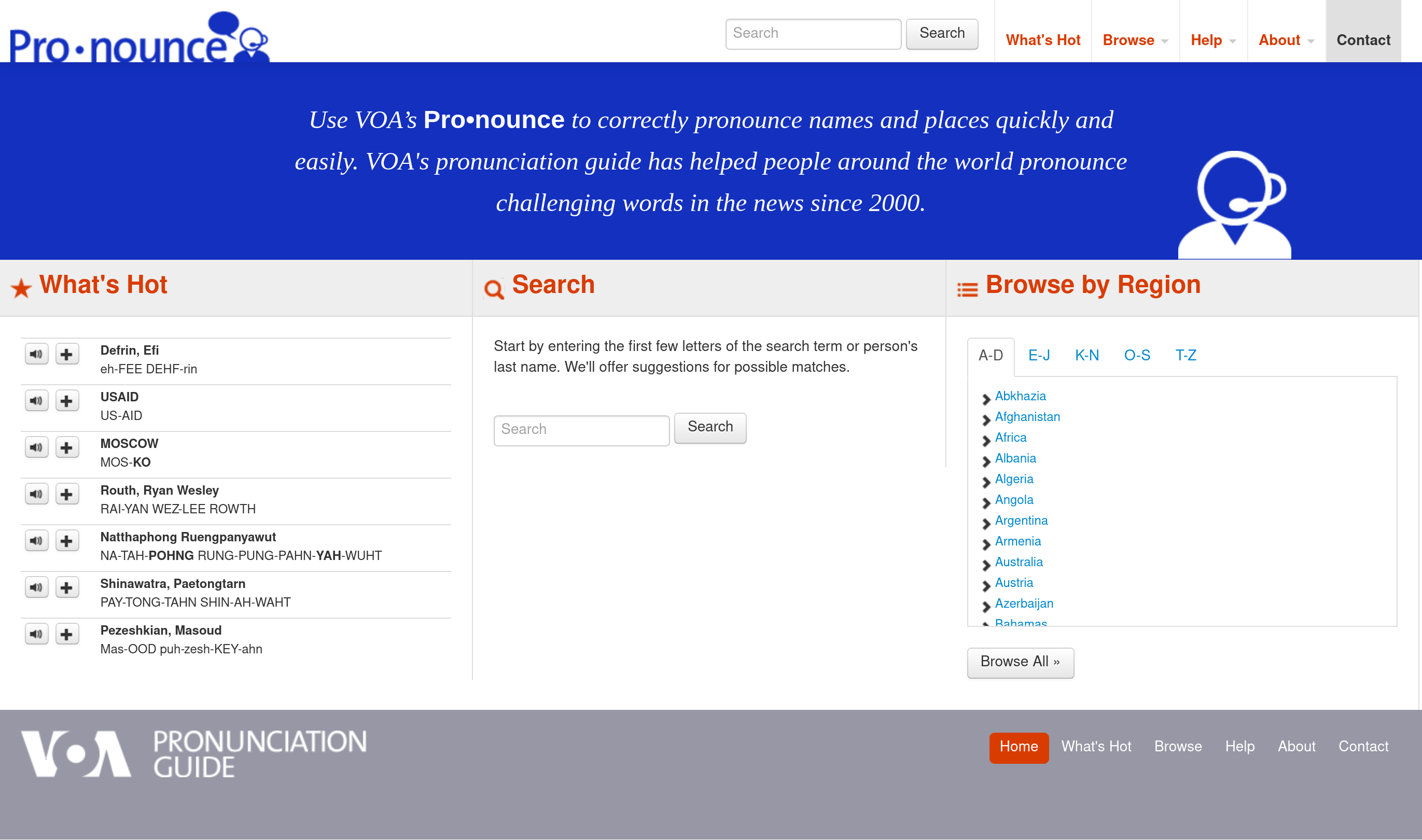
- Homepage on March 6, 2026
- Website type: Pronouncing dictionary
- Available in: American English
- Owner: Federal government of the United States
- Website: pronounce.voanews.com
- Launched: 2000; 26 years ago
- Content license: Work of the United States government
- OCLC number: 47225725

The VOA Pronunciation Guide (or Voice of America Pronunciation Guide) is an online pronunciation reference system by Voice of America (VOA) which provides the General American English pronunciations of names, places, and things found in international news reports, especially global political figures. Entries of the guide each contain a phonetic pronunciation, its country of origin, and a link to an audio pronunciation. It is hosted as a website as part of the VOA network run by the United States government.

It emerged in 2000 as a digitization effort by VOA broadcaster Jim Tedder of the prior reference system of physical notecards, although the guide uses pronunciation respellings instead of the International Phonetic Alphabet transcriptions of the notecards. Originally intended exclusively for newsreaders, the guide soon attracted usage by the general public. Reference Reviews deemed the guide to be "a very useful service in providing authoritative pronunciations of names in the news", and it was endorsed by NPR audio journalism trainer Jerome Socolovsky and NPR reference librarian Kee Malesky. Opinio Juris remarked the website could make one "sound like a well-seasoned diplomat".
