= Javad Khamenei =

Iranian Shia cleric (1895–1986)

- جواد خامنه‌ای
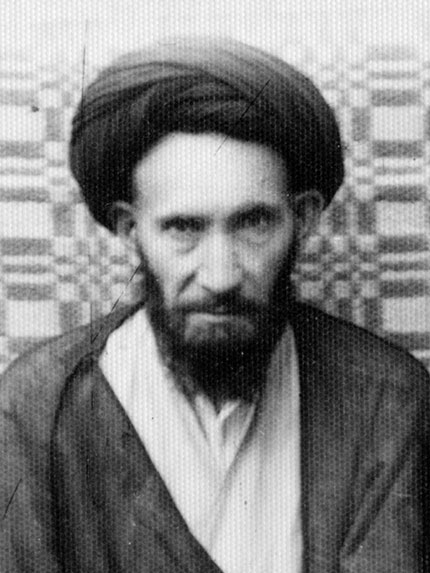
- Khamenei in the 1940s

Personal life
- Born: Javad Hosseini Khamenei; 7 December 1895 Najaf, Ottoman Iraq, Ottoman Empire (now Iraq)
- Died: 6 July 1986 (aged 90) Mashhad, Iran
- Spouse: Khadijeh Mirdamadi
- Children: 8, including Mohammad, Ali, Hadi and Badri
- Education: Qom Seminary
- Relatives: Khamenei family

Religious life
- Religion: Islam
- Denomination: Twelver Shia
- Jurisprudence: Ja`fari
- Creed: Usuli

Javad Hosseini Khamenei (Note: Iranian Persian: جواد حسینی خامنه‌ای, romanized: Javâd Hoseyni Xâmene'i; South Azerbaijani: جواد حۆسینی خامئنئی, romanized: Cavad Hüseyni Xamenei.) (7 December 1895 – 6 July 1986) was an Iranian Shia cleric. A member of the Khamenei family, he was the father of Iran's second supreme leader, Ali Khamenei and grandfather of Iran's third and current supreme leader, Mojtaba Khamenei.

== Early life ==
He was born on 7 December 1895 into a Sayyid family of Iranian Azerbaijanis, in the city of Najaf in Ottoman Iraq, and moved to Tabriz, Iran, as a child. He attended seminary in Najaf, Qom and Mashhad. After finishing his studies, he settled in the vicinity of Ali ibn Musa (al-Ridha) shrine in Mashhad. He was the Imam of an Azerbaijani mosque in Mashhad. He had three daughters from his first marriage, named Alaviyeh, Batoul and Fatemeh Soltan. After the death of his first wife, he married Khadijeh Mirdamadi, an ethnic Persian, with whom he had one daughter (Badri Khamenei) and four sons (Mohammad Khamenei, Ali Khamenei, Hadi Khamenei and Mohammad Hassan Khamenei).

== Death ==
Javad Khamenei died on 6 July 1986. He was buried at the portico, behind Imam Reza Shrine, next to Dar-ol-Feiz.

== See also ==
- Khamenei family
- Family tree of Ali
