= Ali Tehrani =

Iranian theologian and writer (1926–2022)

- علی تهرانی
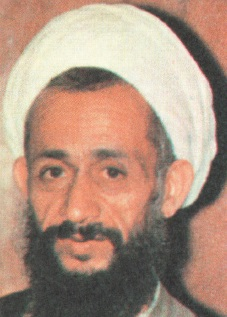
- Tehrani in 1979

Member of Assembly of Experts for the Constitution
- In office 19 August 1979 – 15 November 1979
- Constituency: Khorasan province
- Majority: 559,639 (52.69%)

Personal details
- Born: 25 April 1926 Arangeh, Karaj, Imperial State of Iran
- Died: 19 October 2022 (aged 96) Tehran, Iran
- Spouse: Badri Khamenei
- Children: 5; including Farideh
- Relatives: Ali Khamenei (brother-in-law)

Ali Tehrani (born Ali Moradkhani Arangeh, Persian: علی مرادخانی ارنگه; 25 April 1926 – 19 October 2022) was an Iranian Shia Islamic theologian and writer. He served as the representative of Khorasan province in the Assembly of Experts for Constitution.

During his youth, he fought the Pahlavi dynasty and was arrested, put in jail and sent to exile by the regime. He was a Mujtahid and a disciple of Seyyed Hossein Borujerdi and Ruhollah Khomeini. After the Islamic Revolution and continuing his political career, he was sent to prison in Mashhad and was eventually released after months. When Khomeini appointed Khameni as Tehran's Friday Prayer Imam, Tehrani opposed the move. Tehrani then secretly fled from the state-imposed house arrest in March 1984 to Iraq. From there, he preached against the Islamic Republic and its rulers, in broadcasts by Baghdad's Farsi-speaking radio and television. He returned to Iran in 1995 and was sentenced to 20 years in prison but was released ten years later in 2005. Through his wife Badri Khamenei, he was Ali Khamenei's brother-in-law.

== Disputes with Islamic Republic's leadership ==
Ali Tehrani's estrangement from the leadership of the Islamic Republic began soon after the Islamic Revolution, when he advocated for a more liberal political system. Therefore, he chose to support the "liberal" faction within the newly established Islamic Republic. According to CIA reports, he was a supporter of the People's Mojahedin Organization of Iran (MEK).

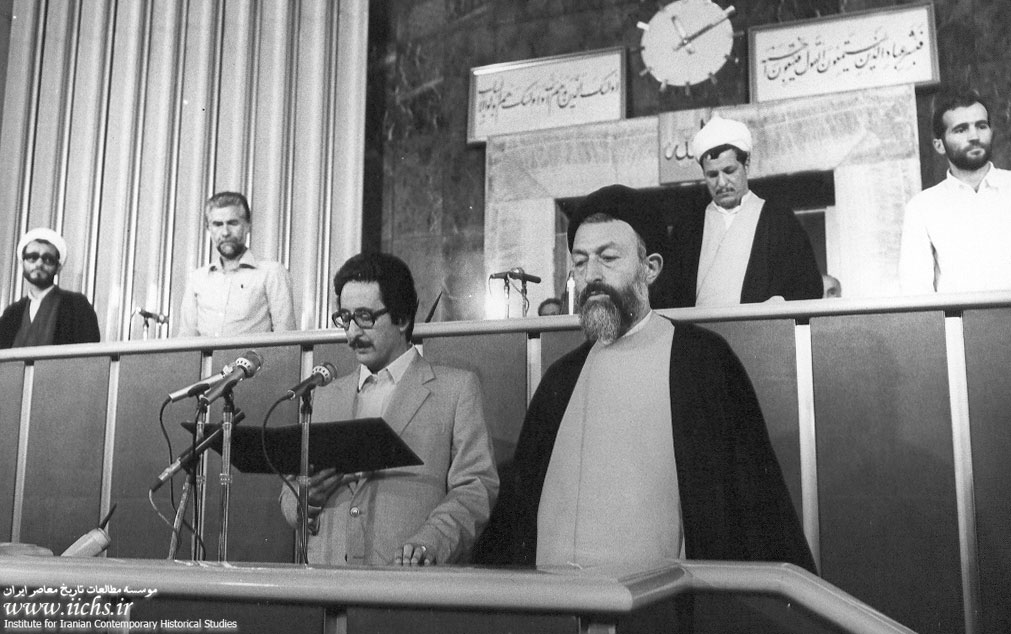
Banisadr in the Iranian parliament

In 1980, ahead of the Iranian presidential elections, tensions escalated between Tehrani and the Islamic Republic leadership over their preferred candidates for the presidency. Tehrani supported Abolhassan Banisadr, while Ali Khamenei, Mohammad Hosseini Beheshti, and Akbar Hashemi Rafsanjani favored Jalaleddin Farsi who was the candidate for Islamic Republic party at the time. However, Farsi was eventually declared ineligible for the presidency after it was revealed that he was of Afghan origin, a point raised by Tehrani, who wrote a letter to Khomeini, stating that Farsi could not be a candidate due to his Afghan origins. Ultimately, Banisadr won the election, as Tehrani had hoped.

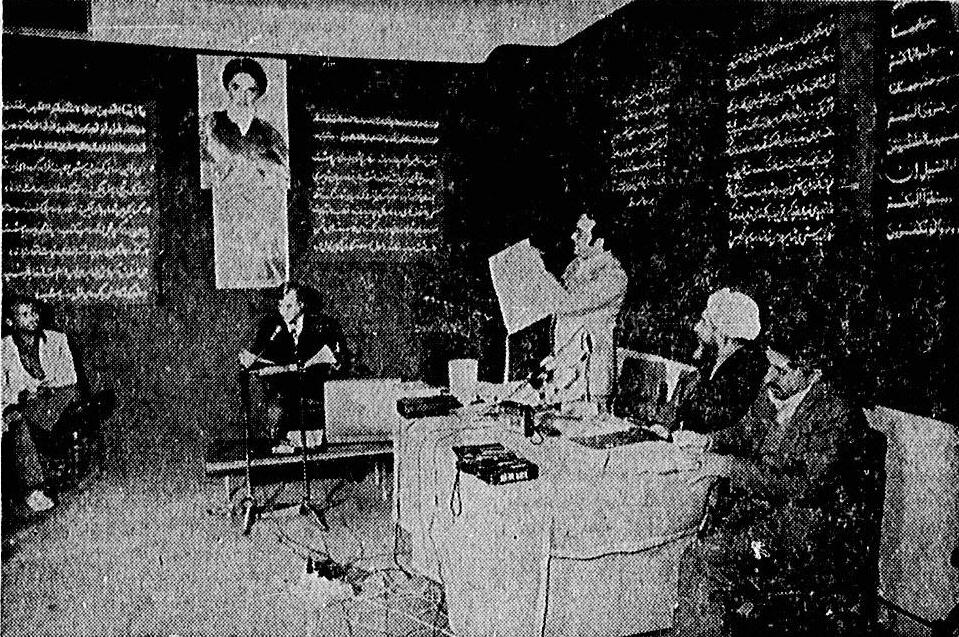
Abbas Amir-Entezam in court

Another point of conflict between these figures was the case of Abbas Amir-Entezam. Entezam was sentenced to life imprisonment on charges of spying for the U.S. Tehrani claimed that two of three members of the Islamic Republic's leadership, namely Ali Khamenei, Hashemi Rafsanjani, and Mohammad Hosseini Beheshti, had collaborated with Entezam.

When Khomeini appointed Khamenei as the Tehran's Friday prayer Imam, Tehrani condemned this decision. Reporters asked Khamenei about Tehrani's stance and he responded, "Now that you insist, I must say that Ali Tehrani has unfortunately fallen victim to a conspiracy. He is a naive person and has thus been successfully manipulated by others in their plotting." This incident ended all relations between the two.

== Personal life ==
Tehrani married Badri Khamenei, the sister of Ali Khamenei in the 1950s. Badri would become a prominent critic of her brother's rule as Iran's Supreme Leader. The couple had five children: three daughters and two sons. Four of them have remained distant from politics, in contrast to their father, while one of his daughters, Farideh Moradkhani, is known for her opposition to the Islamic Republic. She gained attention in Western media during the protests against the Iranian leadership in 2022.

== Later life and death ==
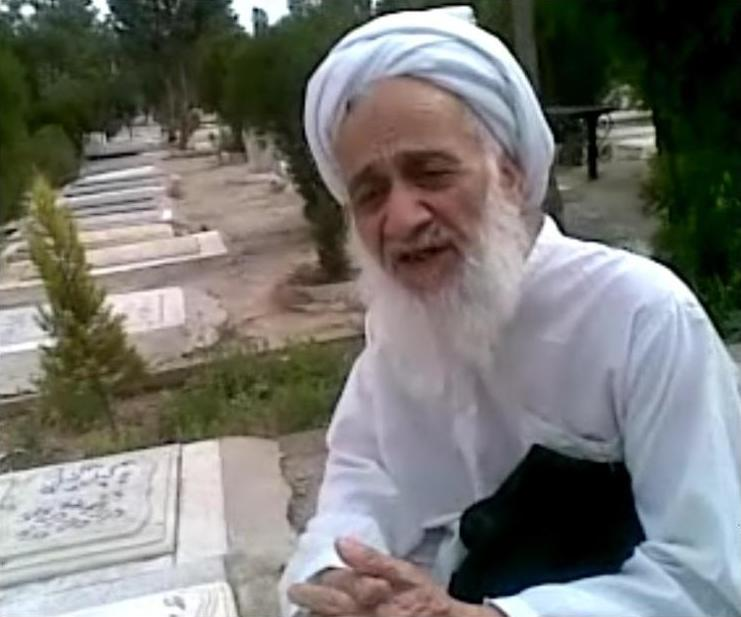
One of the last known pictures of Ali Tehrani

Following the dismissal of Banisadr from the presidency and the armed rebellion of the Mojahedin-e-Khalq against the government, Tehrani was detained for a period in 1981. However, he was released after expressing remorse and requesting clemency from the authorities. Later, in 1984, as Mojahedin-e-Khalq had established a presence in Iraq, he fled the country and sought refuge under Saddam Hussein's government, where he continued to speak out against the Iranian leadership through broadcasts on Persian-speaking radio in Baghdad, an action that diminished his popularity among the general public.

When Badri Khamenei requested permission from her brother, Ali Khamenei, to join her husband, he refused. She then left Iran illegally with their five children. The couple returned to Iran in 1995, and Tehrani was sentenced to 20 years in prison. He was released after serving 10 years and remained largely silent after his release in 2005. Tehrani died on 19 October 2022, at the age of 96.
