= Mohammad Bagher Kharazi =

Iranian cleric

Seyyed Mohammad Bagher Kharrazi
- محمدباقر خرازی
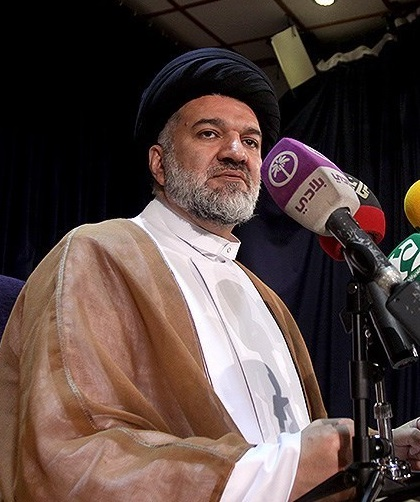
- Born: 26 June 1961 (age 65); Qom, Iran
- Education: Qom Hawza
- Occupations: Politician; Cleric; Journalist
- Years active: 1990s–present
- Parent: Mohsen Kharazi
- Relatives: Sadegh Kharazi (brother); Kamal Kharazi (uncle)
- Website: Official website

Sayyid Mohammad Bagher Kharazi (Persian: سید محمدباقر خرازی) (born 26 June 1961) is an Iranian cleric and a candidate for the presidential elections held in June 2013. His nomination was rejected by Guardian Council.

== Early life and education ==
Kharrazi was born on 26 June 1961. He was educated in Qom.

== Career and political activities ==
Kharazi is secretary general of Hezbollah of Iran. He was appointed to this post in 1990. He owns a daily with the same name with the organization. He is a religious teacher and one of his students is Mojtaba Khamenei.

He ran for the presidential elections that were held in 2013. He was registered for the elections on 9 May 2013. However, his candidacy was rejected by Iran's Guardian Council on 21 May 2013.

=== Views ===
In February 2013, Kharazi claimed "If I am elected as president, I will return the lands of Tajikistan, Armenia and Azerbaijan, which were separated from Iran." Iran lost these lands to the Tsardom of Russia in the 19th century.
