= Mohsen Kharazi =

Iranian Ayatollah

Ayatollah; Seyyed; Mohsen Kharazi
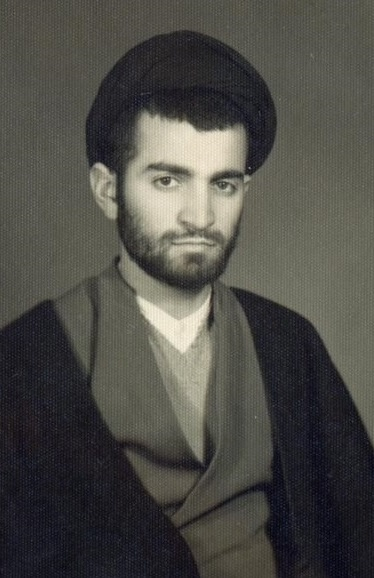
- Kharazi in 1962
- Born: 1937 (age 88–89); Tehran, Iran

Seyyed Mohsen Kharazi (Persian: سید محسن خرازی) (born in 1937 in Tehran) is a member of the Assembly of Experts of the Islamic Republic of Iran. He was a candidate for the 4th Assembly of Experts.

== See also ==
- List of ayatollahs
