= Ali Khamenei =

Supreme Leader of Iran from 1989 to 2026

Grand Ayatollah; Seyyed; Ali Khamenei
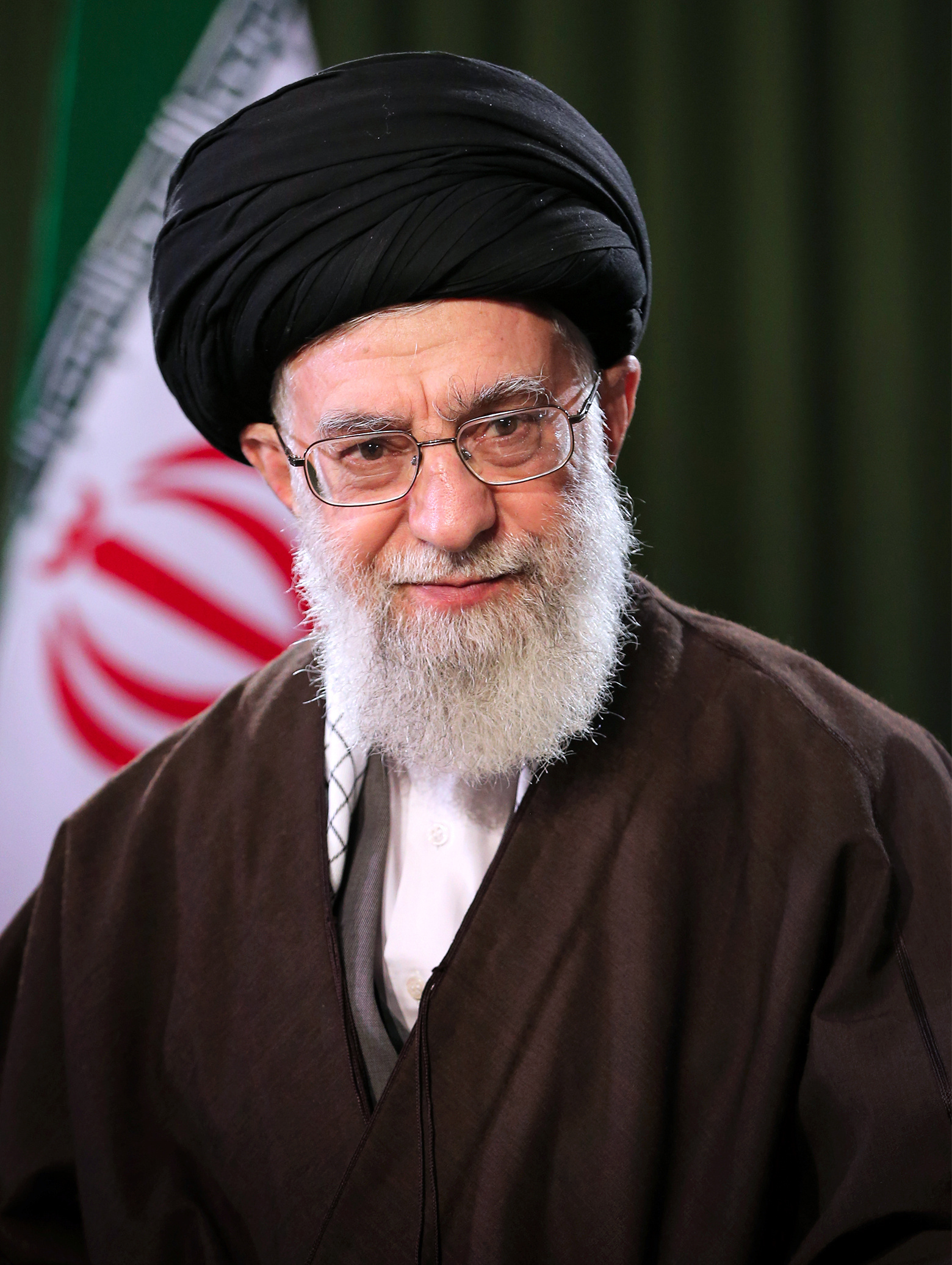
- Khamenei in 2017

Supreme Leader of Iran
- In office 4 June 1989 (Note: Acting: 4 June – 6 August 1989) – 28 February 2026
- President: See list: Himself; Akbar Hashemi Rafsanjani; Mohammad Khatami; Mahmoud Ahmadinejad; Hassan Rouhani; Ebrahim Raisi; Mohammad Mokhber (acting); Masoud Pezeshkian
- Prime Minister: Mir-Hossein Mousavi (Jun–Aug 1989)
- Preceded by: Ruhollah Khomeini
- Succeeded by: Mojtaba Khamenei (Note: Between Ali Khamenei's death on 28 February and Mojtaba Khamenei's election on 8 March, the Interim Leadership Council was tasked with handing the duties of the supreme leader.)

President of Iran
- In office 9 October 1981 – 16 August 1989
- Supreme Leader: Ruhollah Khomeini; Himself
- Prime Minister: Mir-Hossein Mousavi
- Preceded by: Mohammad-Ali Rajai (Note: Between Mohammad-Ali Rajai’s death on 30 August and Ali Khamenei’s election on 2 October and his swearing into office on 9 October, the Interim Presidential Council was tasked with handing the duties of the president.)
- Succeeded by: Akbar Hashemi Rafsanjani
Other offices held
1st Chairman of the Expediency Discernment Council
In office 7 February 1988 – 4 June 1989
Appointed by	Ruhollah Khomeini
Preceded by	Office established
Succeeded by	Akbar Hashemi Rafsanjani
Member of the Assembly of Experts
In office 15 August 1983 – 4 June 1989
Constituency	Tehran Province
Member of the Islamic Consultative Assembly
In office 28 May 1980 – 13 October 1981
Constituency	Tehran, Rey and Shemiranat
Tehran's Friday Prayer Imam
In office 14 January 1980 – 28 February 2026
Appointed by	Ruhollah Khomeini
Interim Imams	Full list
Preceded by	Hussein-Ali Montazeri
Succeeded by	Vacant

Personal details
- Born: Ali Hosseini Khamenei; 19 April 1939 Mashhad, Iran
- Died: 28 February 2026 (aged 86) Tehran, Iran
- Cause of death: Assassination by airstrike
- Resting place: Imam Reza shrine, Mashhad
- Party: Islamic Republican Party (1979–1987); Independent (from 1989) (Note: He was officially a member of the Combatant Clergy Association until 2019.)
- Other political affiliations: Combatant Clergy Association (1977–1989)
- Spouse: Mansoureh Khojasteh Bagherzadeh (m. 1964)
- Children: 6, including Mostafa, Mojtaba, and Masoud
- Parents: Javad Khamenei (father); Khadijeh Mirdamadi (mother)
- Relatives: Khamenei family
- Education: Najaf Seminary; Qom Seminary
- Website: english.khamenei.ir

Military service
- Branch/service: Islamic Revolutionary Guard Corps; Irregular Warfare Headquarters
- Years of service: 1979–1989 (Note: As supreme leader, he remained active as commander-in-chief of the Islamic Republic of Iran Armed Forces.)
- Commands: Islamic Republic of Iran Armed Forces
- Battles/wars: Iranian Revolution; Aftermath of the Iranian Revolution (WIA); Iran–Iraq War; Operation Samen-ol-A'emeh; Iran–Israel conflict; 2024 Iran–Israel conflict; Twelve-Day War; 2026 Iran war X

Personal life
- Main interests: Uṣūl al-Fiqh; Tafsir
- Notable idea: Fatwa against nuclear weapons

Religious life
- Religion: Islam
- Denomination: Twelver Shi'a
- Jurisprudence: Ja'fari
- Creed: Usuli

Muslim leader
- Teacher: Husayn Burujardi; Ruhollah Khomeini
- Khamenei's voice Khamenei speaking at the Hussainiya of Lovers of Karbala in Sari, Iran; Recorded 14 October 1995

Ali Hosseini Khamenei (Note: Iranian Persian: علی حسینی خامنه‌ای, romanized: 'Ali Hoseyni Xâmene'i, Iranian Persian pronunciation: [ʔæˈliː hosejˈniː xɒːmeneˈʔiː]; see Khamenei family § Pronunciation for English pronunciations.) (19 April 1939 – 28 February 2026) was an Iranian politician and Shia cleric who served as the supreme leader of Iran from 1989 until his assassination by Israeli airstrikes in 2026. The patriarch of the Khamenei family prior to his death, Khamenei had previously served as the president of Iran from 1981 to 1989. His 36-year tenure makes him Iran's longest-serving supreme leader.

Born in Mashhad to the Khamenei family, he studied at a hawza there before settling in Qom in 1958, where he attended the classes of Ruhollah Khomeini. Khamenei became involved in opposition to Mohammad Reza Pahlavi, and was arrested six times before being exiled for three years by the Pahlavi government. Khamenei was a mainstream figure in the Iranian Revolution, and upon its success, held many posts in the newly established Islamic republic. In the aftermath of the revolution, he was the target of an attempted assassination that paralysed his right arm. Khamenei served as the third president of Iran from 1981 to 1989 during the Iran–Iraq War, when he also developed close ties to the Islamic Revolutionary Guard Corps (IRGC). After the death of Ruhollah Khomeini in 1989, Khamenei was elected supreme leader by the Assembly of Experts. During the deliberations, Khamenei expressed reservations about his own religious qualifications and suitability for the position, as he was a mid-ranking cleric and did not meet the constitutional requirement of marja'. The constitution was subsequently amended to remove that requirement, and the Assembly reconfirmed his leadership later that year.

As supreme leader, Khamenei supported Iran's nuclear program for civilian use while issuing a fatwa forbidding the production of weapons of mass destruction. In 2015, Khamenei endorsed the Iran nuclear deal, which restricted Iran's nuclear activities in exchange for sanctions relief, but the agreement unraveled after the United States withdrew from it in 2018. He favoured economic privatization of Iranian state-owned industries and, using its oil and gas reserves, transformed Iran into an "energy superpower". His foreign policy centered on Shia Islamism and exporting the Islamic Revolution. Khamenei played a pivotal role in shaping Iran's military and paramilitary apparatus following the 1979 Islamic Revolution, especially the IRGC, transforming it into a primary tool for domestic control and regional influence, in turn making Iran a regional power. Under Khamenei, Iran supported the Axis of Resistance coalition in the Syrian civil war, the War in Iraq, the Yemeni civil war, and the Gaza war, as well as Russia during the Russo-Ukrainian war. A staunch critic of Israel and of Zionism, Khamenei supported the Palestinians in the Israeli–Palestinian conflict; his rhetoric included calls for Israel's destruction and antisemitic tropes. Under Khamenei, Iran was involved in proxy wars with Israel and Saudi Arabia. In 2025 and 2026, tensions with Israel and the United States escalated into the Twelve-Day War and an ongoing conflict, during the latter of which Khamenei was assassinated. The Assembly of Experts elected his son Mojtaba as successor on 8 March. Khamenei's state funeral took place from 3 July to 9 July and drew millions from across Iran.

His decades in power were marked by the development of a strong personality cult, which he actively promoted, as well as by his ability to appoint loyalists to key positions across Iran's political and state institutions. His authority was highly centralized, with loyalty to him expected from senior officials. During his tenure, Iran's economy experienced periods of stagnation and decline, while substantial financial resources were allocated to the country's nuclear program. The program contributed to tensions with Western powers and eventually resulted in international sanctions that placed significant pressure on Iran's economy.

Identified as a pragmatic hardliner, Khamenei sidelined leftist factions, moderate clerics, and political dissidents, while occasionally easing restrictions when the regime's stability or legitimacy had been threatened. His leadership was closely associated with the expansion of state militarization and the consolidation of power within the office of the supreme leader. His critics characterized him as an authoritarian responsible for political repression, state-sanctioned violence, and other injustices. Journalists, activists, and other individuals were persecuted for actions including insulting the supreme leader, sometimes alongside blasphemy charges, with penalties ranging from imprisonment to corporal punishment. There were numerous major protests under his rule, including in 1999, 2009, 2017–2018, 2018–2019, 2022–2023, and 2025–2026.

== Early life and education ==
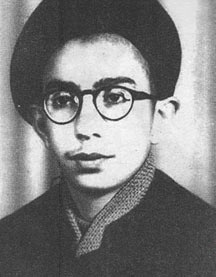
Khamenei as a teenager

Seyyed Ali Hosseini Khamaneh was born on 19 April 1939 to Javad Khamenei, an alim and mujtahid born in Najaf, Iraq, and his second wife Khadijeh Mirdamadi (daughter of Hashem Mirdamadi) in Mashhad. He was the sixth of eight children, the third born to his mother. Two of his brothers are also clerics; his younger brother, Hadi Khamenei, is a newspaper editor and cleric. His elder sister Fatemeh Hosseini Khamenei died in 2015, aged 89. His father was an ethnic Azerbaijani Turk from Khamaneh. His mother was an ethnic Persian from Yazd.

Ali Khamenei's ancestor was Sayyid Hossein Tafreshi, a descendant of the Aftasi Sayyids supposedly reaching to Sultan ul-Ulama Ahmad, known as Sultan Sayyid, a grandchild of the fourth Imam of Shia Islam, Ali al-Sajjad. Some of his ancestors are from Tafresh in today's Markazi Province and migrated from their original home in Tafresh to Khamaneh near Tabriz.

Khamenei's education began at the age of four, by learning the Quran at Maktab; he spent his basic and advanced levels of seminary studies at the hawza of Mashhad, under mentors such as Sheikh Hashem Qazvini and Ayatollah Milani.

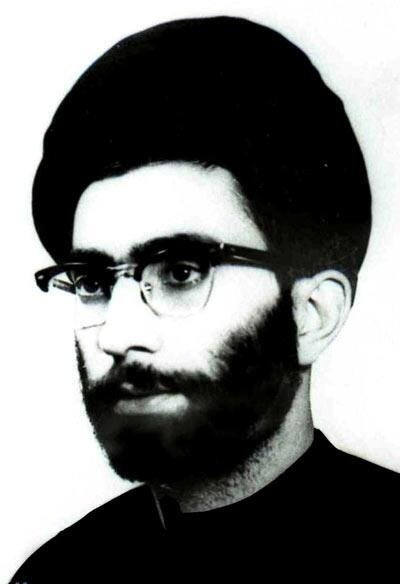
Khamenei in 1962

In Mashhad, Khamenei frequented secular intellectuals as well as the Movement of God-Worshipping Socialists, a political organization that advocated Islamic socialism and was influenced by figures such as Karl Marx, Che Guevara, Tito and Ali Shariati; Khamenei partook in their seminars and sermons, which for Abbas Milani would influence his later Third Worldism. In 1957, he went to Najaf, but soon returned to Mashhad due to his father's unwillingness to let him stay there. In 1958, he settled in Qom, where he attended the classes of Husayn Burujardi and Ruhollah Khomeini. Like many other politically active clerics at the time, Khamenei was far more involved with politics than religious scholarship.

Khamenei would later describe his upbringing in autobiographical reflections as having been raised in a deeply religious household. He stated that his mother came from a clerical family, and that religious education shaped his childhood. He recalled excelling in his studies, reciting the Quran at school, and developing an early interest in hadith and prophetic narratives. He described family gatherings in which his mother recited Quranic verses, particularly those concerning the lives of the prophets. He emphasized his broad intellectual interests beyond religious scholarship, including mathematics, geography, and especially history.

As an adolescent, Khamenei read widely in literature, poetry, and novels, became familiar with major works of Persian poetry, and began composing poetry at a young age. He characterized himself as having a strong memory and an aptitude for literary criticism, stating that he could recall texts read in adolescence and that his critiques of poetry were often affirmed by poets and audiences. He recounted that during the Pahlavi era, he once jumped from a moving train to perform his prayers on time. He described his childhood as marked by poverty, noting that his family lived in a poor neighborhood of Mashhad, his mother made clothes from his father's old garments, and that they at times lacked sufficient food, relying on small amounts of raisins or milk purchased with minor sums provided by relatives.

== Early political career (1960s–1981) ==
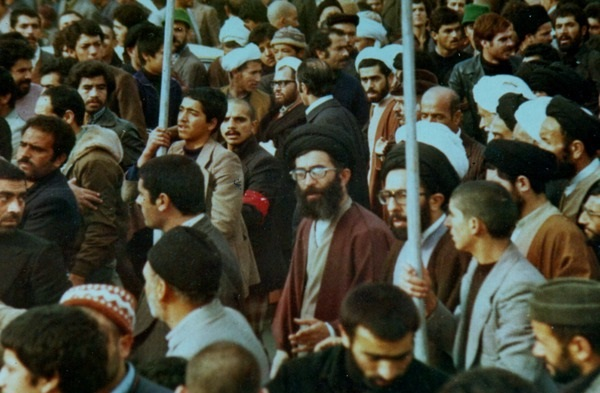
Khamenei in a protest in 1970 in Mashhad

Khamenei first became politically active in the 1960s and 70s amid opposition to the Shah's reign. During that time, he taught at a religious school in Birjand. According to Khamenei's official website, the Shah's intelligence agency, SAVAK, arrested him six times between 1963 and 1976–the first time following the 1963 demonstrations against Ruhollah Khomeini's arrest. Later, restrictions were imposed on his public activities before he was exiled in 1976 for three years until the end of the Shah's reign.

Khamenei was a key figure in the Iranian Revolution and a close confidant of Ruhollah Khomeini. From the founding of the Islamic Republic, Khamenei held many government posts. He served as head of the servants of Astan Quds Razavi from 14 April 1979.

Muhammad Sahimi wrote that Khamenei's political career began after the 1979 Iranian Revolution; he also wrote that Akbar Hashemi Rafsanjani, later president of Iran, brought Khamenei into Khomeini's inner circle. Later on, Hassan Rouhani, then a member of Parliament, arranged for Khamenei to get his first major post in the provisional revolutionary government as deputy defense minister.

In 1980, after the resignation of Hussein-Ali Montazeri, Ayatollah Khomeini appointed Ali Khamenei to the position of Tehran's Friday Prayers Imam. Khamenei was briefly the Vice Minister of National Defence from late July to 6 November 1979 and served as a supervisor of the Islamic Revolutionary Guards. He also served on the battlefield as a representative of the Iranian Parliament's Defense Commission.

=== 1981 assassination attempt ===
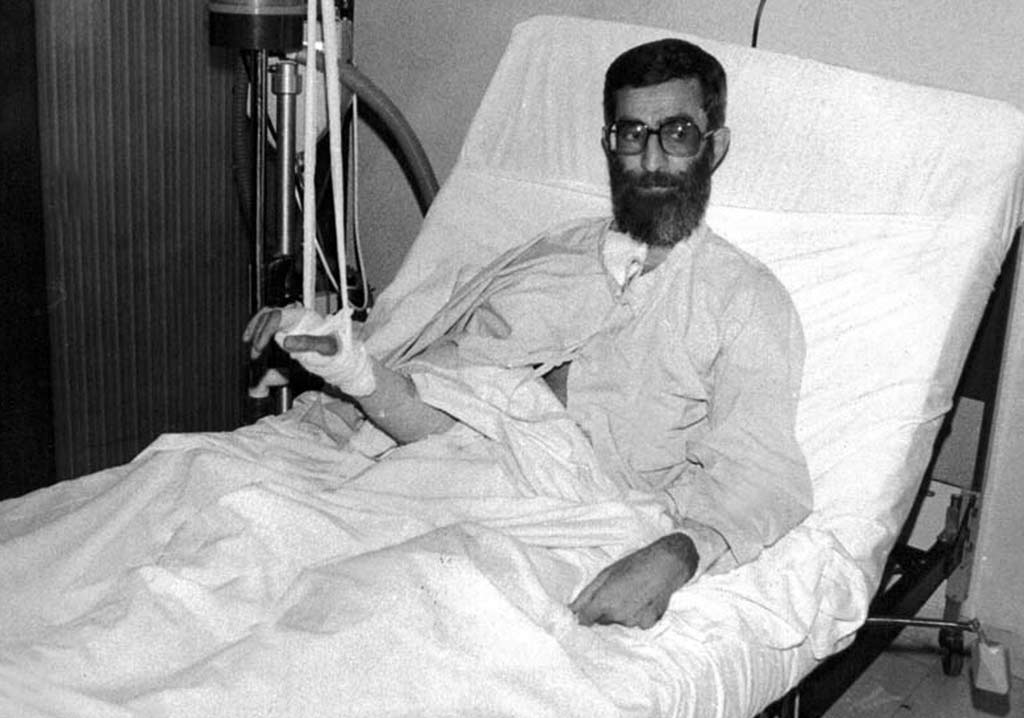
Khamenei in the hospital after the assassination attempt

Khamenei narrowly escaped assassination by the Mujahedin-e Khalq when a bomb, concealed in a tape recorder, exploded beside him. On 27 June 1981, while Khamenei had returned from the frontline, he went to the Aboozar Mosque according to his Saturday schedule. After the first prayer, he lectured to worshippers who had written their questions on paper.

During the event, a young man posing as a journalist – described as "of medium height, curly hair, beard and chequered coat" placed a tape recorder on the desk in front of Khamenei and pressed a button on the device. After about a minute, the recorder began whistling and then suddenly exploded. "A gift of Furqan Group to the Islamic Republic" was written on the inner wall of the tape recorder. Khamenei's treatment took several months and his arm, vocal cords and lungs were seriously injured. He was permanently injured, losing the use of his right arm.

== Presidency (1981–1989) ==
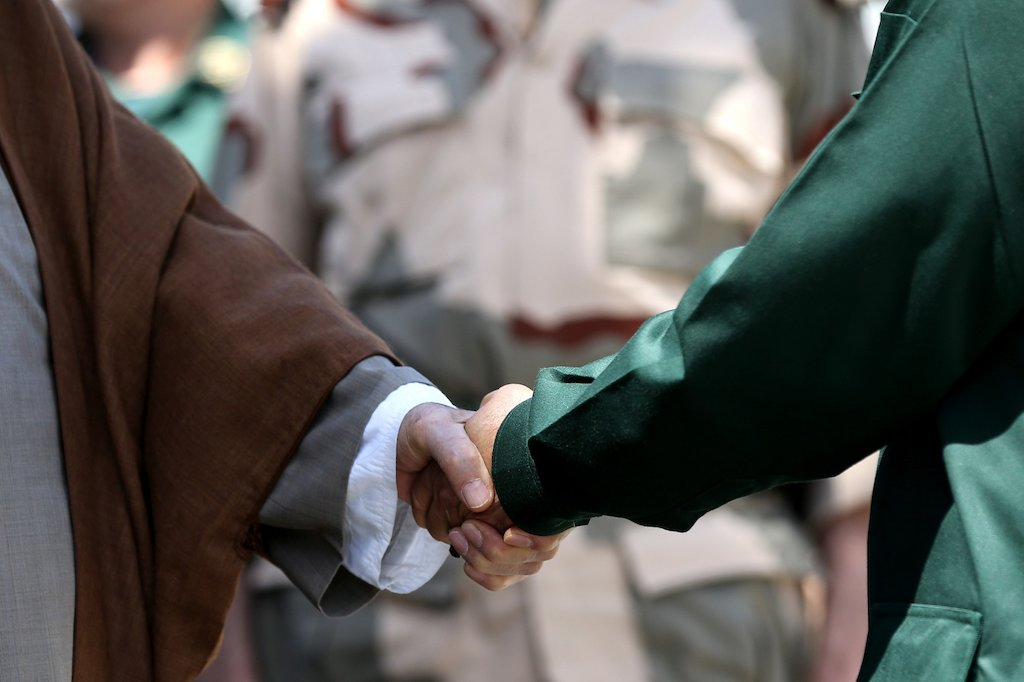
Khamenei shook hands with his left hand after an unsuccessful attempt on his life.

In 1981, after the assassination of Mohammad-Ali Rajai, Khamenei was elected President of Iran by a landslide vote (97%) in the October 1981 Iranian presidential election in which only four candidates were approved by the Council of Guardians. Khamenei became the first cleric to hold office. Ruhollah Khomeini had originally wanted to keep clerics out of the presidency, but later changed his views. In the 1985 Iranian presidential election, where only three candidates were approved by the Council of Guardians, Ali Khamenei was reelected as President of Iran, receiving 87% of the votes.

In his presidential inaugural address, Khamenei vowed to eliminate "deviation, liberalism, and American-influenced leftists". According to the Iran Chamber, vigorous opposition to the government, including nonviolent and violent protest, assassinations, guerrilla activity and insurrections, was answered by state repression and terror in the early 1980s, both before and during Khamenei's presidency. Thousands of rank-and-file members of insurgent groups were killed, often by revolutionary courts. By 1982, the government announced that the courts would be reined in, although various political groups continued to be repressed by the government in the first half of the 1980s.

=== During the Iran–Iraq war ===
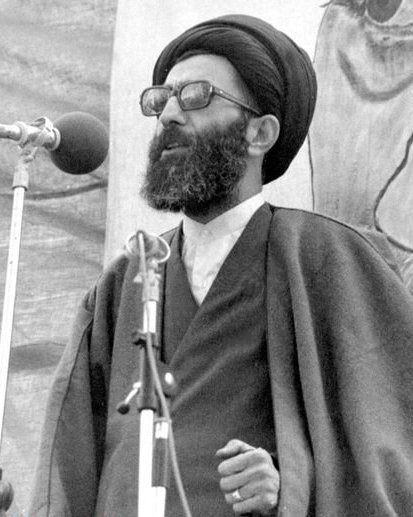
Khamenei as Tehran's Friday Prayer Imam in 1980

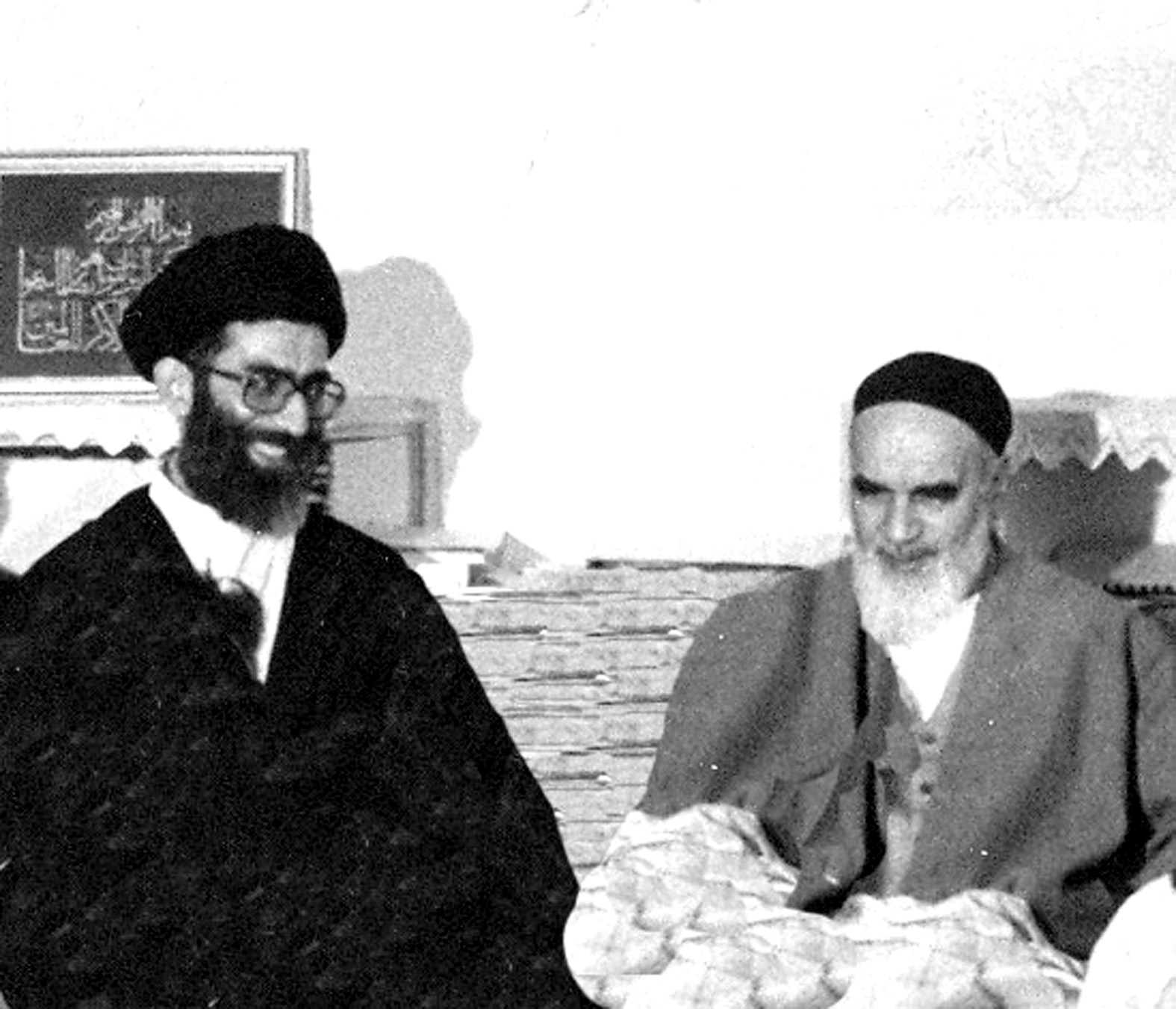
Khamenei (left) with then Supreme Leader, Ruhollah Khomeini (right), 1986

Khamenei was one of Iran's leaders during the Iran–Iraq War in the 1980s and developed close ties with the now-powerful Revolutionary Guards. The Revolutionary Guards have been deployed to suppress opposition to the Islamic Republic of Iran. As president, he had a reputation for being deeply interested in the military, budget and administrative details.

After the Iraqi Army was expelled from Iran in 1982, Khamenei became one of the main opponents of his own decision to counter-invade into Iraq, an opinion Khamenei shared with Prime Minister Mir-Hossein Mousavi, with whom he would later conflict during the 2009 Iranian presidential election protests.

=== Post-war ===
In May 1989, Khamenei undertook a four-day visit to North Korea, becoming the highest-level Iranian leader to visit the country since the Iranian Revolution. He held several talks with North Korean leader Kim Il Sung in Pyongyang. According to Ruhollah Khomeini's son Ahmad, Khamenei was selected by his father as his successor on the basis of his visit to North Korea.

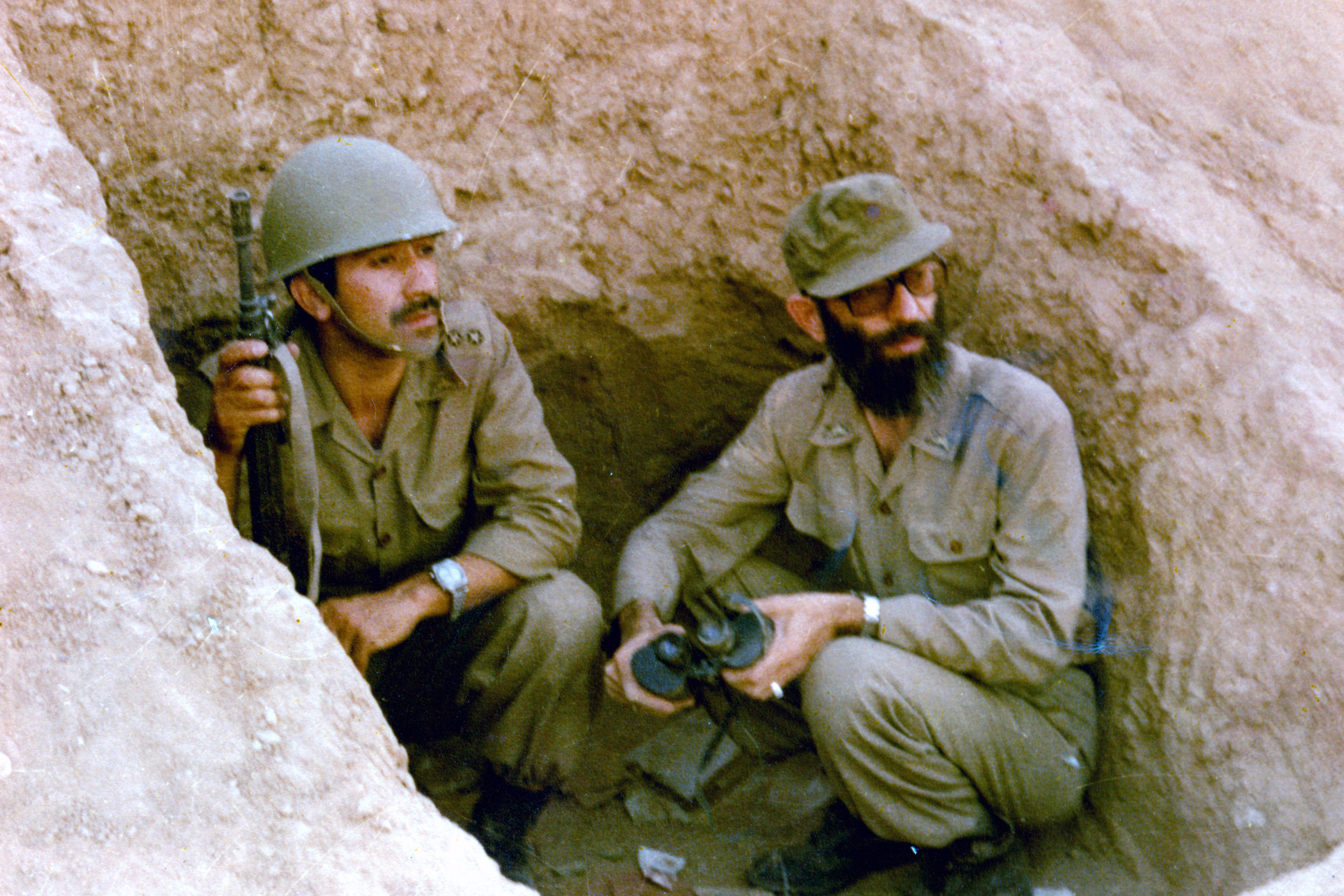
Khamenei (right) during the Iran–Iraq War

In its 10 April 1997 ruling regarding the Mykonos restaurant assassinations, the German court issued an international arrest warrant for Iranian intelligence minister Ali Fallahian, after declaring that the assassination had been ordered by him with knowledge of Khamenei and Rafsanjani. Iranian officials have categorically denied their involvement. The then-Iranian Parliament speaker Ali Akbar Nategh-Nouri dismissed the ruling as political, untrue and unsubstantiated. The ruling led to a diplomatic crisis between the governments of Iran and several European countries, which lasted until November 1997. The accused assassins, Darabi and Rhayel, were released from prison on 10 December 2007 and deported back to their home countries.

== Supreme Leadership (1989–2026) ==
=== Election as Supreme Leader ===
In 1989, Ayatollah Khomeini dismissed Ayatollah Montazeri as his political successor, giving the position to Khamenei instead. Because Khamenei was neither a marja' nor an ayatollah, the Assembly of Experts had to modify the constitution to award him the position of Iran's new supreme leader (a decision opposed by several grand ayatollahs). Khamenei officially succeeded Ruhollah Khomeini after Khomeini's death, being elected as Acting Supreme Leader by the Assembly of Experts on 4 June 1989. (Note: Attributed to multiple sources:)

==== Leadership Council proposal ====
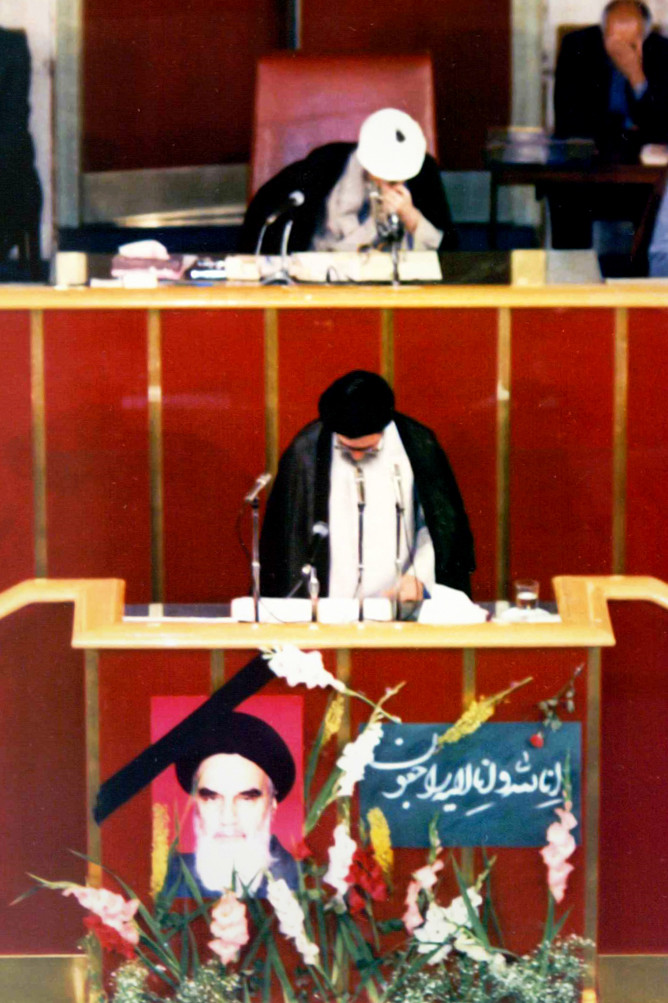
Khamenei reading the will of Ruhollah Khomeini in the Assembly of Experts

Initially, some members of the Assembly of Experts proposed the idea of a leadership council. Various lists were proposed, and Khamenei was named in all of them. For instance, a council of three members, Ali Meshkini, Abdul-Karim Mousavi Ardebili and Khamenei, was proposed to lead Iran. According to Rafsanjani, he and Khamenei were against the proposal, while Ayatollah Haeri Shirazi and Ayatollah Ebrahim Amini were in favor of it. Supporters of the council proposal believed that having a council would produce a higher degree of unity in society and that more positive characteristics would be found in a council. In contrast, the opposers believed that an individual leader was more efficient according to past experiences in the case of the Judiciary Council.

Ebrahim Amini listed the summary of the reasons presented by the two sides. According to him, the opposers rejected the proposal because: I) Evidence for Guardianship of the Islamic Jurist was true only for the guardianship of an individual, and it was not clear who held the guardianship when there was a council. The guardianship of a council was not rooted in Hadiths and Islamic jurisprudence. II) Previous council-type organizations, such as the broadcasting council and the supreme judicial council, were not successful in practice, and the leadership council would not do well for similar reasons. III) People were accustomed to the leadership of an individual, and a council of leaders was something unfamiliar to them. IV) An individual leader could act more decisively when dealing with critical and essential decisions and solving problems and crises.

On the other hand, the supporters of the proposal believed that: I) At the time, there were no Faqīh equal to Khomeini or even two or three levels lower than him so that he could fulfill the expectation of people. II) In the case of a council of leaders, the members could compensate each other if any of them had a shortage in a field.

45 members voted against the leadership council proposal while more than 20 people were in favor of it, and the proposal was rejected. After the assembly rejected the idea of a Leadership Council, Khamenei was elected Leader by 60 of the 74 members present, with Grand Ayatollah Mohammad-Reza Golpaygani receiving the remaining 14 votes. Although he eventually accepted the post, Khamenei made protestations of his unworthiness, saying "my nomination should make us all cry tears of blood", and debated with the mujtahids of the Assembly.

==== Marja' criteria ====
Since Khamenei was not a marja'(a senior clerical authority in Twelver Shi'ism) at the time—which the Iranian constitution required—he was named as the temporary supreme leader. Later, the constitution was amended to remove that requirement, and the Assembly of Experts reconvened on 6 August 1989 to reconfirm Khamenei with 60 votes out of 64 present. On 29 April 1989, responding to the letter of Ayatollah Ali Meshkini, the head of committee responsible for revising the Constitution, asking Khomeini's viewpoint regarding the Marja' criteria, Khomeini said: "From the very beginning, I believed and insisted that there is no need for the requirements of marja'iyyat (authority in jurisprudence). A pious mujtahid (jurist-intellectual), who is approved by the esteemed Assembly of Experts (Majlis-i Khobregan), will suffice".

In a video that surfaced during the 2017–2018 Iranian protests, Khamenei was seen before the assembly saying he was not religiously qualified to be a supreme leader. Khamenei, who was ranked as a Hujjat al-Islam and not a marja' as required by the Iranian constitution, said he would only be a "ceremonial leader", and was reassured by Akbar Hashemi Rafsanjani that the position would be "temporary" until a referendum, apparently planned for one year later. (Note: Attributed to multiple sources:) Following a constitutional referendum held on 28 July 1989 which removed the marja' requirement, Khamenei was officially elected by the Assembly of Experts as the official permanent supreme leader on 6 August.

On 29 August 2022, Kazem al-Haeri announced his resignation from the position of marja' due to old age and illness. This was described as the first time in history a marja' has ever resigned from his position. He called on his followers to follow Ali Khamenei, Supreme leader of Iran, as "the best person for the leadership of our people and removing the aggressors".

=== Political strategy and philosophy ===
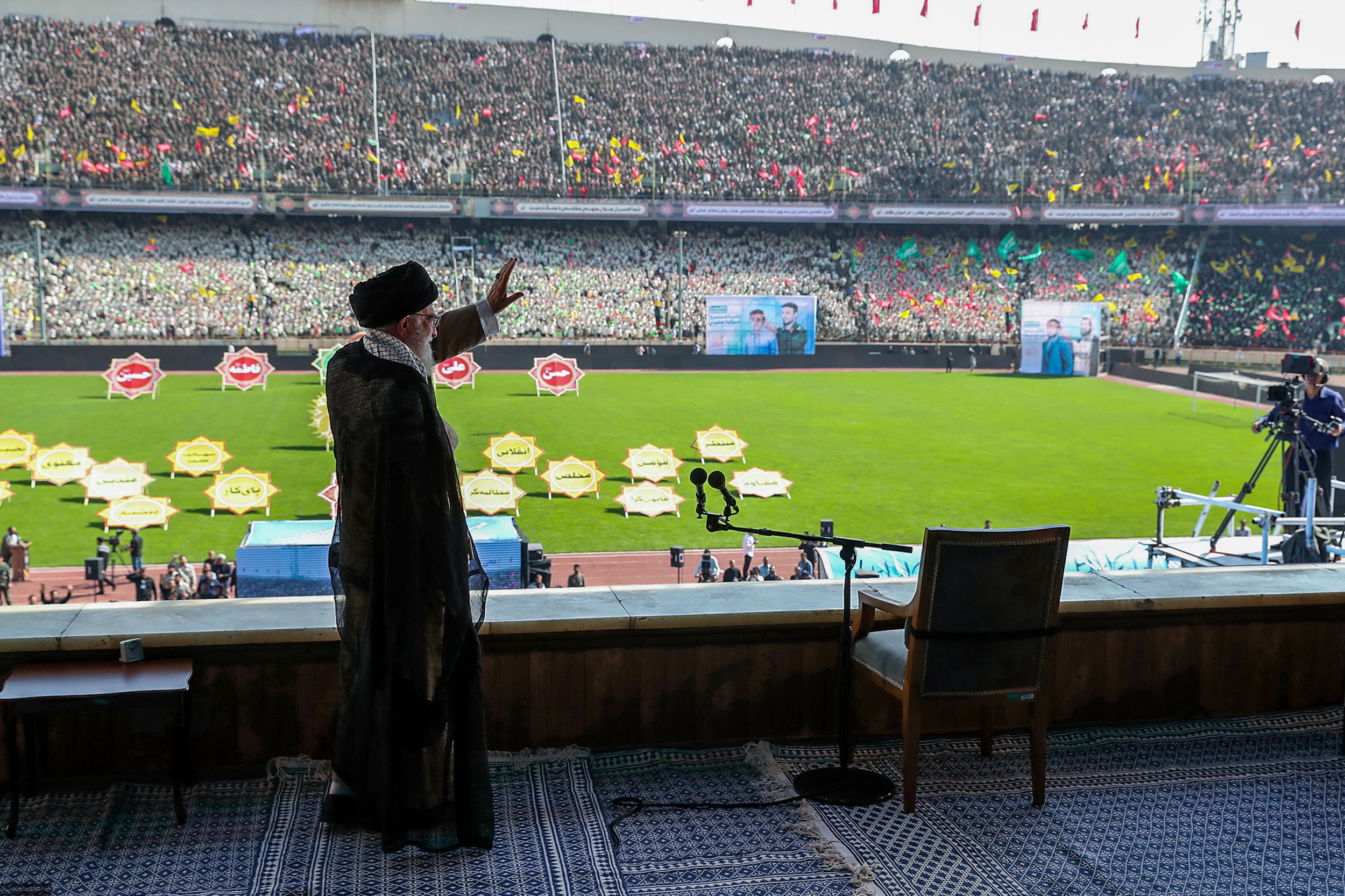
Khamenei at the Great Conference of Basij members at Azadi Stadium, October 2018

Khamenei in a 2023 speech

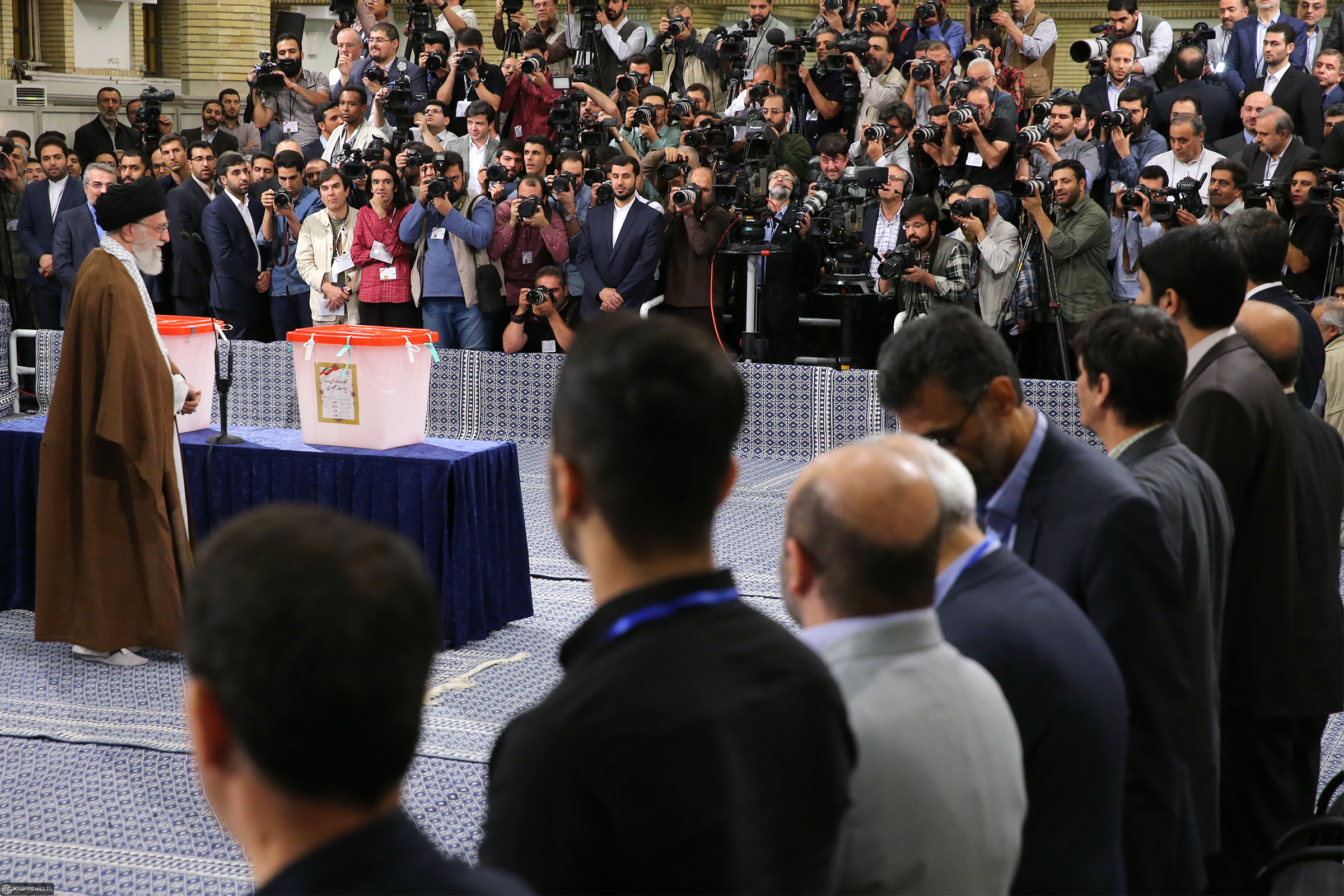
Ali Khamenei voting in the 2017 Presidential election

Lacking Khomeini's charisma and clerical standing, he had developed personal networks, first inside the armed forces and then among the clerics, while administering the major bonyads and seminaries of Qom and Mashhad. Having been the supreme leader for three decades, Khamenei was able to place many loyalists throughout Iran's major institutions, "building a system that serves and protects him". Former cleric Mehdi Khalaji and Saeid Golkar described Khamenei's system as having created a "parallel structure" for each of the country's institutions (army, intelligence agencies, etc.) to keep those institutions weak.

According to Vali Nasr of the Johns Hopkins School of Advanced International Studies, "[Khamenei] [took] many of the powers of the presidency with him and [turned] the office of the supreme leader into the omnipotent overseer of Iran's political scene". In Nasr's view, Khamenei was an "unusual sort of dictator". Officials under Khamenei influenced the country's various powers, and sometimes bickering, institutions, including "the parliament, the presidency, the judiciary, the Revolutionary Guards, the military, the intelligence services, the police agencies, the clerical elite, the Friday prayer leaders and much of the media", as well as various "nongovernmental foundations, organizations, councils, seminaries and business groups".

Khamenei issued decrees and made the final decisions on the economy, environment, foreign policy and everything else in Iran. (Note: Attributed to multiple sources:) Khamenei regularly met with the president, cabinet members, head and officials of the judiciary branch, parliamentarians, among others, and told them what to do. (Note: Attributed to multiple sources:) Khamenei also fired and reinstated presidential cabinet appointments. Khamenei met with foreign dignitaries, but he did not travel internationally; anyone wishing to see him had to travel to Iran. Apart from his time in Najaf as a student, Khamenei traveled to Libya during his time as president.

According to Karim Sadjadpour of the Carnegie Endowment for International Peace, Khamenei had "resisted Rafsanjani's attempts to find a modus vivendi with the United States, Khatami's aspirations for a more democratic Islamic state, and Ahmadinejad's penchant for outright confrontation."

In his speeches, Khamenei regularly mentioned many familiar themes of the 1979 revolution: justice, independence, self-sufficiency, Islamic government and resolute opposition to Israel and the United States, while rarely mentioning other revolutionary ideals such as democracy and greater government transparency. Scholars have also described this rhetoric as demonstrating the Islamic Republic's broader ideological mindset of resistance to Western hegemony and "global arrogance," with the United States often portrayed as the leading force of global imperialism.

==== Privatisation of state-owned businesses ====
In 2007, Khamenei called for privatising state-owned companies, including the telephone company, three banks and dozens of small oil and petrochemical enterprises. After a few months, at a televised meeting with then-President Mahmoud Ahmadinejad and his Cabinet ministers, important clerics, the leader of parliament and provincial governors, the heads of state broadcasting and the Iranian chamber of commerce, Khamenei ordered: "to pass some laws, sell off some businesses, and be quick about it". Khamenei warned that "those who are hostile to these policies are the ones who are going to lose their interests and influence".

=== Dispute regarding status as Grand Ayatollah ===
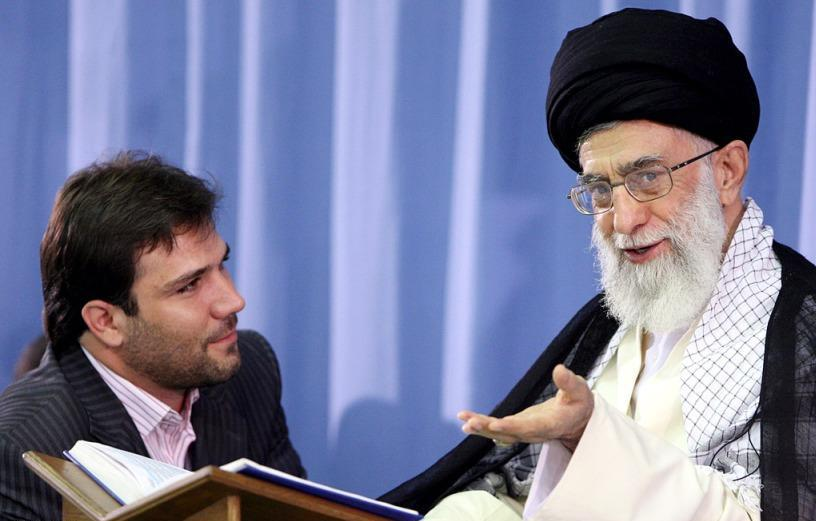
Khamenei during a meeting with a Qāriʾ

In 1994, after the death of Grand Ayatollah Mohammad Ali Araki, the Society of Seminary Teachers of Qom declared Khamenei a new marja'. Several ayatollahs, however, declined to recognize him as such. Some of those dissident clerics included Mohammad Shirazi, Hossein-Ali Montazeri, Hassan Tabatabai-Qomi, and Yasubedin Rastegar Jooybari. In 1997, for example, Montazeri "questioned the powers of the Leader" and was subsequently punished for his comments with the closure of his religious school, an attack on his office in Qom, and a period of house arrest.

=== Appointments ===
The table below lists some of the incumbent senior officeholders in Iran that were directly appointed by the supreme leader during his tenure (sorted by date of appointment):

Office	Incumbent	Date appointed	Limit	Ref.
Commander of Islamic Republic of Iran Army	MG Amir Hatami	14 June 2025	—N/a	
Commander of Islamic Revolutionary Guard Corps	MG Mohammad Pakpour	13 June 2025	—N/a	
Chief-of-Staff of Iranian Armed Forces	MG Abdolrahim Mousavi	13 June 2025	—N/a	
Head of Bonyad Mostazafan	Hossein Dehghan	29 October 2023	5 years	
Chief of Police	BG Ahmad-Reza Radan	7 January 2023	3 years	
Head of Islamic Republic of Iran Broadcasting	Peyman Jebelli	29 September 2021	—N/a	
Chief Justice of Iran	Gholam-Hossein Mohseni-Eje'i	1 July 2021	5 years (2 terms)	
Head of Imam Khomeini Relief Committee	Morteza Bakhtiari	22 July 2019	—N/a	
Custodian of Astan Quds Razavi	Ahmad Marvi	30 March 2019	—N/a	
Head of Islamic Azad University's Board of Trustees	Ali Akbar Velayati	19 January 2017	—N/a	

=== Political power following reform era ===
Khamenei developed a cult of personality, with supporters describing him as a "divine gift to mankind" and in which critics of him were persecuted. (Note: Attributed to multiple sources:) Iran's former Chief Justice Sadiq Larijani, a Khamenei appointee, would warn the president of Iran against voicing opposition to Khamenei.

According to Karim Sadjadpour of the American Carnegie Endowment for International Peace, several factors had strengthened Khamenei in recent years:

1) A vast network of commissars stationed in strategic posts throughout government bureaucracies, dedicated to enforcing his authority; 2) the weak, conservative-dominated parliament, headed by Khamenei loyalist Gholam-Ali Haddad-Adel (whose daughter is married to the Leader's son); 3) the rapidly rising political and economic influence of the Islamic Revolutionary Guards, whose top leaders are directly appointed by Khamenei and have always been publicly obedient to him; 4) the political disengagement of Iran's young population ...; and 5) most significant[ly], the 2005 presidential election, which saw hardliner Mahmoud Ahmadinejad trounce Khamenei's chief rival ... Hashemi Rafsanjani ...

According to Christopher Dickey, to consolidate his power base, Khamenei had developed close relations with the security and military establishment while also expanding the bureaucracy inside the government and around his Beit Rahbari compound.

=== Financial assets ===
Writing in The Daily Telegraph in 2013, Damien McElroy and Ahmad Vahdat observed: "The ayatollah likes to cultivate an image of austerity but receives major commissions from the Iranian oil and arms industries and there have been regular claims that he and his son have amassed a fortune running into billions of dollars." A six-month investigation by Reuters said that Khamenei controlled a "financial empire" worth approximately US$95 billion that the Iranian Parliament did not oversee, a figure much larger than the estimated wealth of the final Shah of Iran, Mohammad Reza Pahlavi. According to the Reuters investigation, Khamenei used the assets of a company called Headquarters for Executing the Order of the Imam or "Setad" in Farsi to increase his grip on power.

Reuters found "no evidence" that Khamenei was "tapping Setad to enrich himself", but did find that he used Setad's funds, which "rival the holdings of the shah", for political expedience: Setad gave him "the financial means to operate independently of parliament and the national budget, insulating him from Iran's messy factional infighting". According to The Daily Telegraph, money from Setad is used to fund Khamenei's Beit Rahbari compound, which employs over 500 stewards, as was reported in 2013.

Hamid Vaezi, Setad's head of public relations, said the information "was far from realities and is not correct". The six-month investigation by Reuters found that, regarding the source of Setad's funds, "Setad built its empire on the systematic seizure of thousands of properties belonging to ordinary Iranians: members of religious minorities like Vahdat-e-Hagh, who is Baha'i, as well as Shi'ite Muslims, business people and Iranians living abroad."

Despite the negative accounts of Western sources, Iranian official authorities depict Setad as a vast charity foundation. In an October 2014 interview with Islamic Republic News Agency, Muhammad Mukhber, the head of Setad, stated that over 90% of profits from Setad business activities were spent on improving infrastructure in the poor regions of the country, creating jobs and improving the well-being of people in these regions reflecting the top concerns of Khamenei. He cited the construction of several hundred schools, mosques, and hussainiyas, as well as direct and indirect contributions to the formation of over 350,000 jobs, expecting a total of 700,000 for the upcoming three years.

Mukhber also cited a sum total grant of 2.21 trillion rials of Qard al-Hasan, interest-free loans, to 41,000 families in poor regions of the country. He also revealed plans for a gradual sell-off of Setad's profitable businesses on the stock market, with the aim of transferring their ownership into the hands of the Iranian people. He also envisioned the construction and delivery of 17,000 housing units to families in poor regions of Iran by 2018.

=== Challenges following 2009 election protest ===
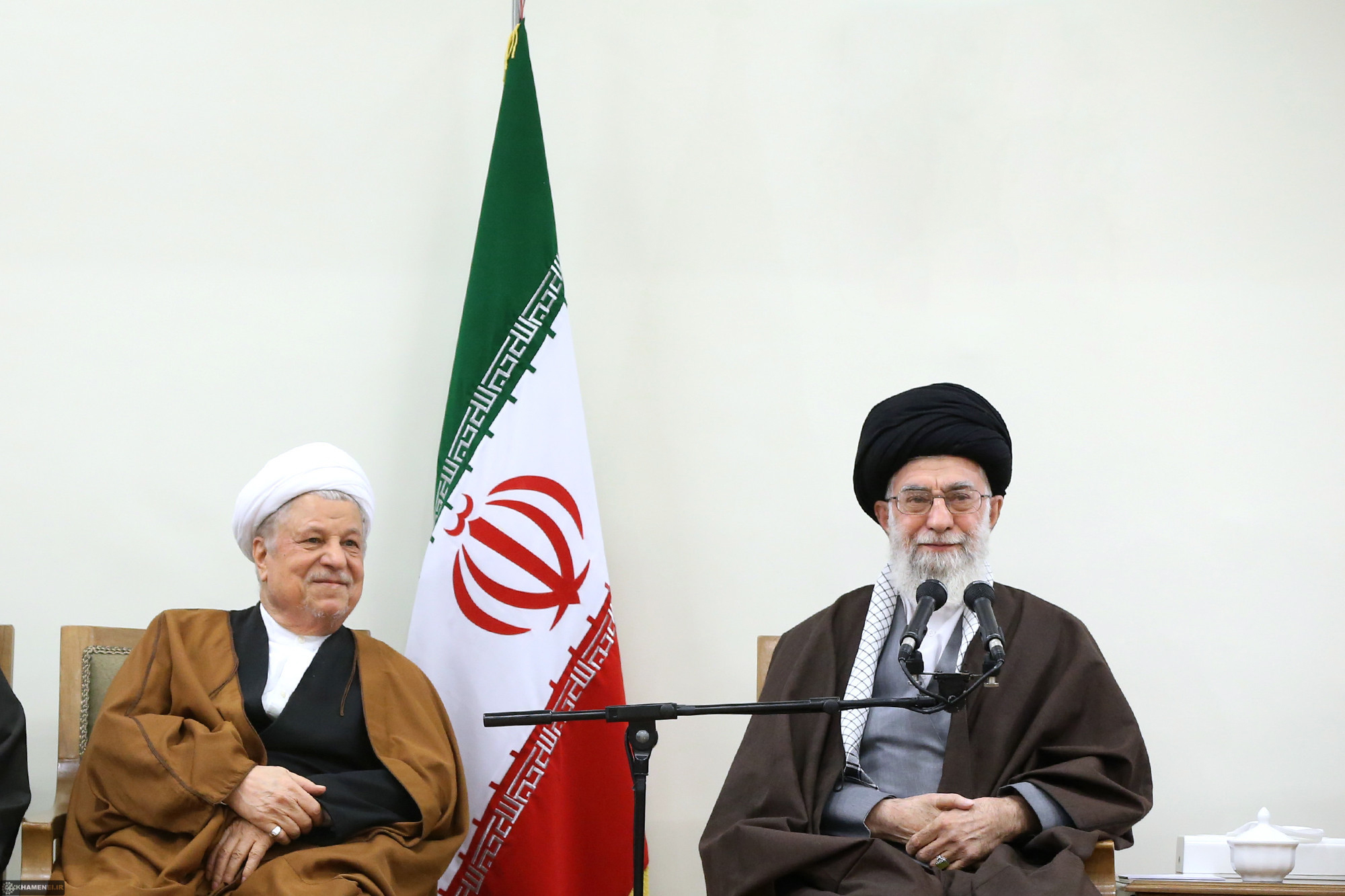
Khamenei and former president Akbar Hashemi Rafsanjani

In mid-August 2009, a group of unnamed former reformist lawmakers appealed to the Assembly of Experts – the constitutional body charged with electing and (in theory) supervising and removing the Leader – to investigate Leader Ali Khamenei's qualification to rule. A week later another anonymous letter was issued "calling Iran's leader a dictator and demanding his removal", this one by a group of Iranian clerics.

The letters were called a blow to Khamenei's "status as a neutral arbiter and Islamic figurehead" and an "unprecedented challenge to the country's most powerful man" though not a blow to his actual power as a leader. The New York Times reported "the phrase "death to Khamenei" has begun appearing in graffiti on Tehran walls, a phrase that would have been almost unimaginable not long ago".

The letter was addressed to the head of the Assembly of Experts, Ayatollah Akbar Hashemi Rafsanjani, a "powerful former president" who also questions the election results. According to the Associated Press, it was unlikely the letter's demands would be met as "two-thirds of the 86-member assembly are considered strong loyalists of Khamenei and would oppose" any investigation of him.

According to The New York Times reporting in mid-August 2009, a "prominent Iranian cleric and a former lawmaker said on Sunday (16 August) that they had spoken to some of the authors and had no doubt the letter was genuine". According to this cleric, the letter's signatories number "several dozen, and are mostly midranking figures from Qum, Isfahan and Mashhad", and that "the pressure on clerics in Qum is much worse than the pressure on activists because the establishment is afraid that if they say anything they can turn the more traditional sectors of society against the regime".

=== Relations with Mahmoud Ahmadinejad ===
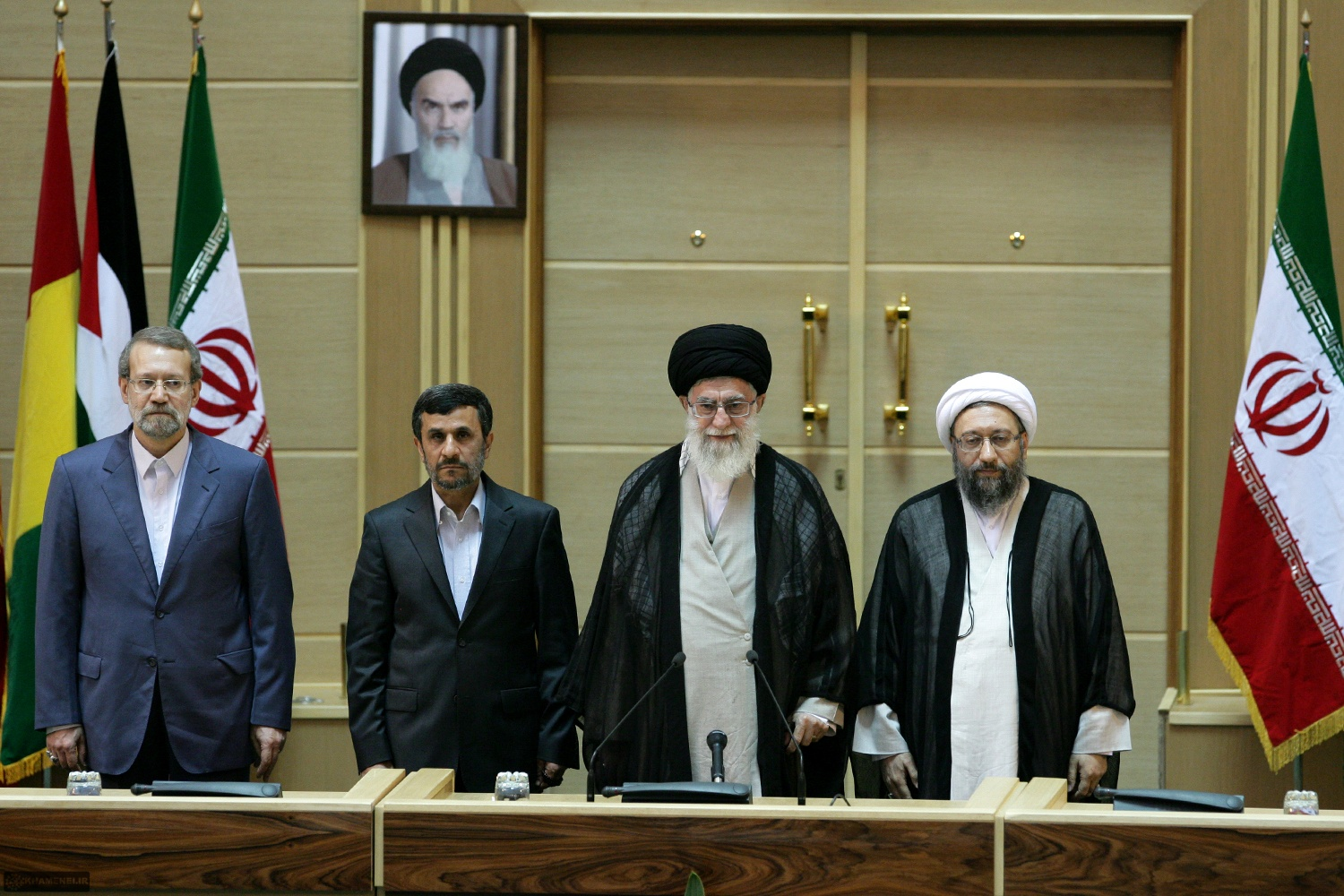
Khamenei with Mahmoud Ahmadinejad, Ali Larijani, and Sadiq Larijani in 2011

Early in his presidency, Ahmadinejad was sometimes described as "enjoy[ing] the full backing" of the supreme leader Ali Khamenei, and even as being his "protégé". In Ahmadinejad's 2005 inauguration the supreme leader allowed Ahmadinejad to kiss his hand and cheeks in what was called "a sign of closeness and loyalty", and after the 2009 election fully endorsed Ahmadinejad against protesters.

However, as early as January 2008 signs of disagreement between the two men developed over domestic policies, and by the period of 2010–2011 several sources detected a "growing rift" between them. The disagreement was described as centered on Esfandiar Rahim Mashaei, a top adviser and close confidant of Ahmadinejad. Mashaei was vice president of Iran until being ordered to resign from the cabinet by the supreme leader, and was also an opponent of "greater involvement of clerics in politics".

In 2009, Ahmadinejad dismissed Intelligence Minister Gholam-Hossein Mohseni-Eje'i, an opponent of Mashaei. In April 2011, another Intelligence minister, Heydar Moslehi, resigned after being asked to do so by Ahmadinejad, but was reinstated by the supreme leader within hours. Ahmadinejad declined to officially back Moslehi's reinstatement for two weeks and in protest engaged in an "11-day walkout" of cabinet meetings, religious ceremonies, and other official functions.

Ahmadinejad's actions led to angry public attacks by clerics, parliamentarians and military commanders, who accused him of ignoring orders from the supreme leader. Conservative opponents in parliament launched an "impeachment drive" against him, four websites with ties to Ahmadinejad reportedly were "filtered and blocked", and several people "said to be close" to the president and Mashaei (such as Abbas Amirifar and Mohammed Sharif Malekzadeh) were arrested on charges of being "magicians" and invoking djinns.

On 6 May 2011, it was reported that Ahmadinejad had been given an ultimatum to accept the leader's intervention or resign, and on 8 May he "apparently bowed" to the reinstatement, welcoming back Moslehi to a cabinet meeting. The events have been said to have "humiliated and weakened" Ahmadinejad. The president denied that there had been any rift between the two, and according to the semiofficial Fars News Agency, he stated that his relationship with the supreme leader "is that of a father and a son".

In 2012, Khamenei ordered a halt to a parliamentary inquiry into Ahmadinejad's mishandling of the Iranian economy. In 2016, Khamenei advised Mahmoud Ahmadinejad, his former ally with whom his relationship was strained after Ahmadinejad accused his son Mojtaba Khamenei of embezzling from the state treasury, not to run for president again. (Note: Attributed to multiple sources:)

Khamenei declined talks for referendums on the state's future, questioning people's judgment and causing public outrage. In 2024, he said that while speaking to his military he had been saying what words God put in his tongue.

== Fatwas and messages ==
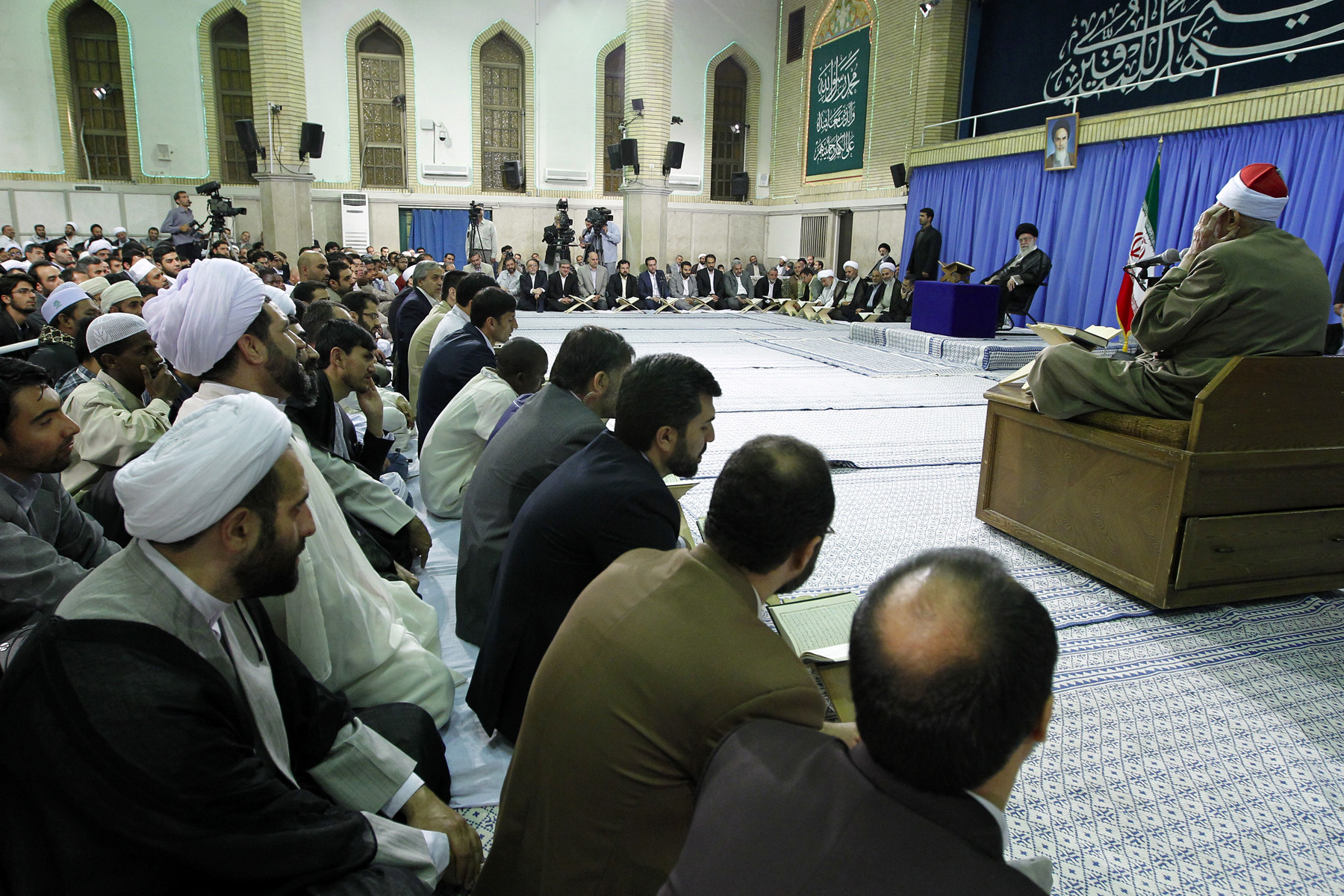
International Holy Quran Competition's participants meeting with Khamenei, June 2013

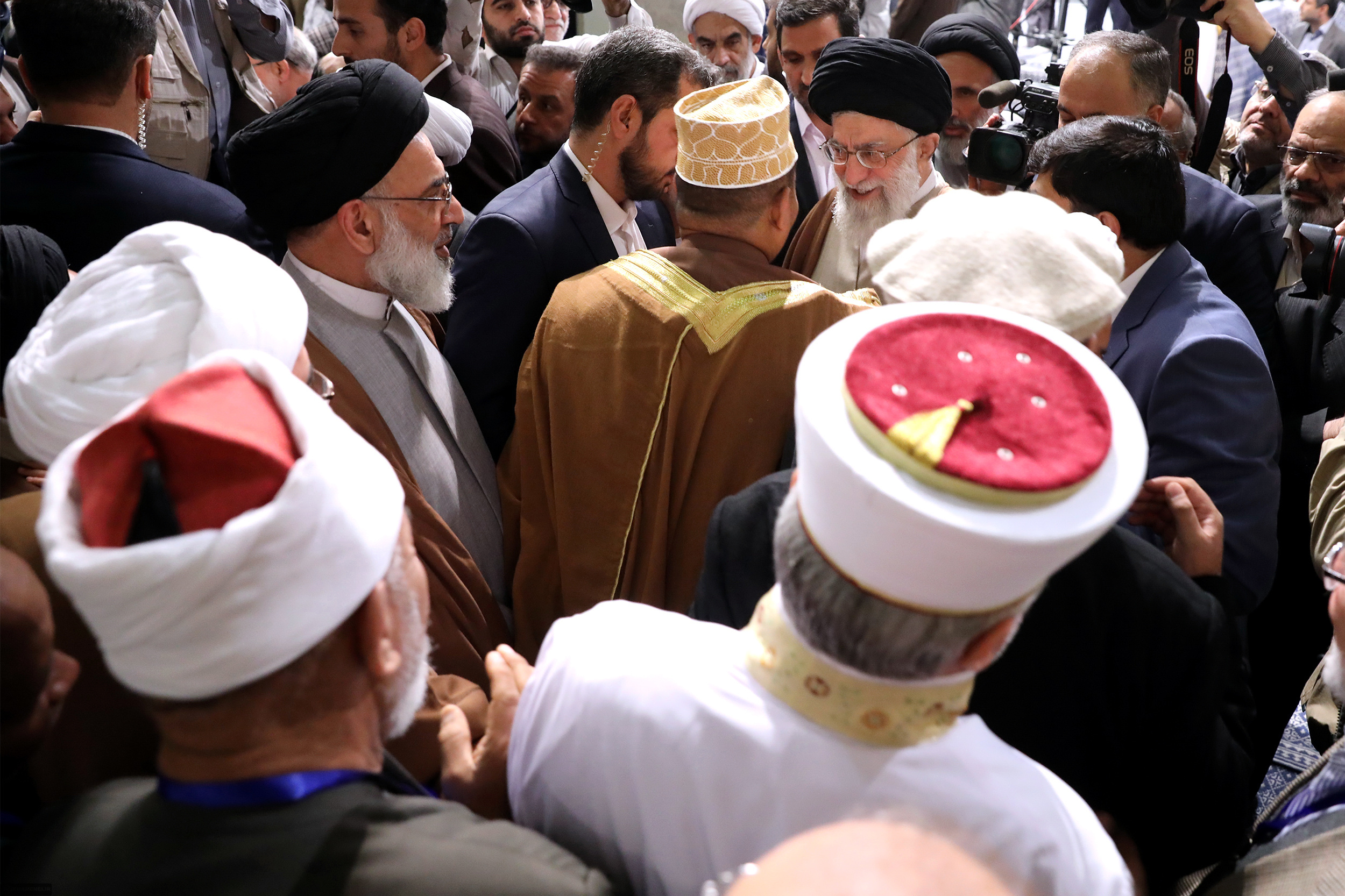
Participants of 31st International Islamic Unity Conference meeting with Khamenei, December 2017

=== Fatwa against nuclear weapons ===
Khamenei reportedly issued a fatwa saying the production, stockpiling, and use of nuclear weapons was forbidden under Islam. The fatwa was cited in an official statement by the Iranian government at an August 2005 meeting of the International Atomic Energy Agency (IAEA) in Vienna. It has been widely discussed by international officials and specifically recognized by the US administration.

The Iranian official website for information regarding its nuclear program has provided numerous instances of public statements by Khamenei wherein he voices his opposition to the pursuit and development of nuclear weapons in moral, religious and Islamic juridical terms. Khamenei's official website specifically cites a 2010 version of these statements in the fatwa section of the website in Farsi as a fatwa on "Prohibition of Weapons of Mass Destruction".

Doubts have been cast by experts on the existence of the fatwa as it can be changed or modified as and when deemed necessary, as well as doubts on its authenticity, its impact, and its apparently religious nature. Gareth Porter believes that the fatwa is "sincere" and Gholam-Hossein Elham commented that it will not change.

=== Fatwa on Islamic legal interpretation ===
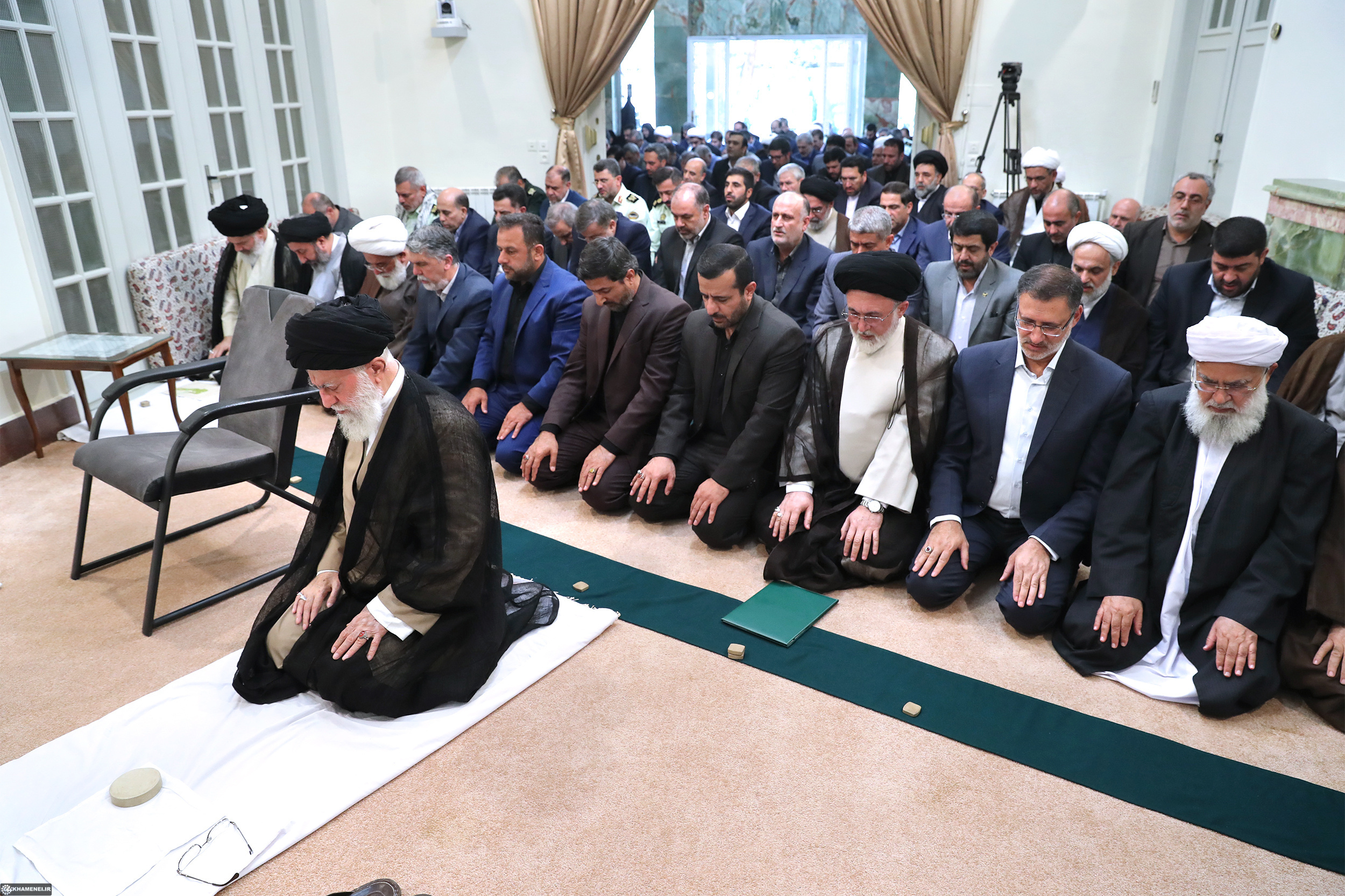
Khamenei praying with Hajj authorities, 2018

In 2000, Khamenei sent a letter to the Iranian parliament forbidding the legislature from debating a revision of the Iranian press law to allow more press freedom. He wrote: "The present press law has prevented this big plague. The draft bill is not legitimate and in the interests of the system and the revolution". Earlier in 1996, he issued a fatwa stating, "The promotion of music [both traditional and Western] in schools is contrary to the goals and teachings of Islam, regardless of age and level of study". Many music schools were closed and public (but not private) music instruction to children under 16 was banned thereafter.

In 1999, Khamenei had issued a fatwa stating that it was permitted to use a third party (donor sperm, ova or surrogacy) in fertility treatments. This was different in "both style and substance" from the fatwa on Assisted Reproductive Technology (ART) by Gad El-Hak Ali Gad El-Hak of Egypt's Al-Azhar University in the late 1980s, which permitted ART (IVF and similar technologies) as long as there is no third-party donation (of sperm, eggs, embryos, or uteruses).

In 2002, Khamenei ruled that human stem cell research was permissible under Islam, with the condition that it be used to create only parts instead of a whole human. Also in 2002, after protests erupted in the capital, Khamenei intervened against the death sentence given to Hashem Aghajari for arguing that Muslims should re-interpret Islam rather than blindly follow leaders. Khamenei ordered a review of the sentence against Aghajari, which was later commuted to a prison sentence.

=== Other messages ===
Since becoming the supreme leader of Iran in 1989, Khamenei issued annual messages on the occasion of Hajj for all Muslims (pilgrims). He continually invited all Muslims to Tawhid, and expressed the significance of Hajj in spiritual and social life. He also asked Muslims to be aware of what he considered "the conspiracy of the enemies" by having a right comprehension and advised them to "not be deceived by them". He issued 32 messages. A part of his 6 August 2019 message was as follows:

The ritual of Bara'ah which means refusing every instance of mercilessness, cruelty, wrongdoing and corruption of the tyrants of any time, and rising against intimidation and extortion by the arrogant throughout history, is one of the great blessings of Hajj, and an opportunity for oppressed Muslim nations.

Khamenei was one of the Ulama signatories of the Amman Message, which gives a broad foundation for defining Muslim orthodoxy. As well as elaborating on the factors needed to create Islamic unity, he argued: "neither the Shia Muslims allied with the British MI6 are Shias, nor the Sunni mercenaries of the American CIA are Sunnis, as they are both anti-Islamic".

=== Other fatwas ===
In 2010, Khamenei issued a fatwa that banned any insult to the Companions of the Prophet. The fatwa was issued to reconcile legal, social, and political disagreements between Sunni and Shia. In 2017, he issued a fatwa stating that women should avoid riding bicycles in the presence of non-Mahram men, while indicating it may be permissible if modesty guidelines are observed, that it "not attract strangers."

== Political positions ==
=== Domestic policy ===
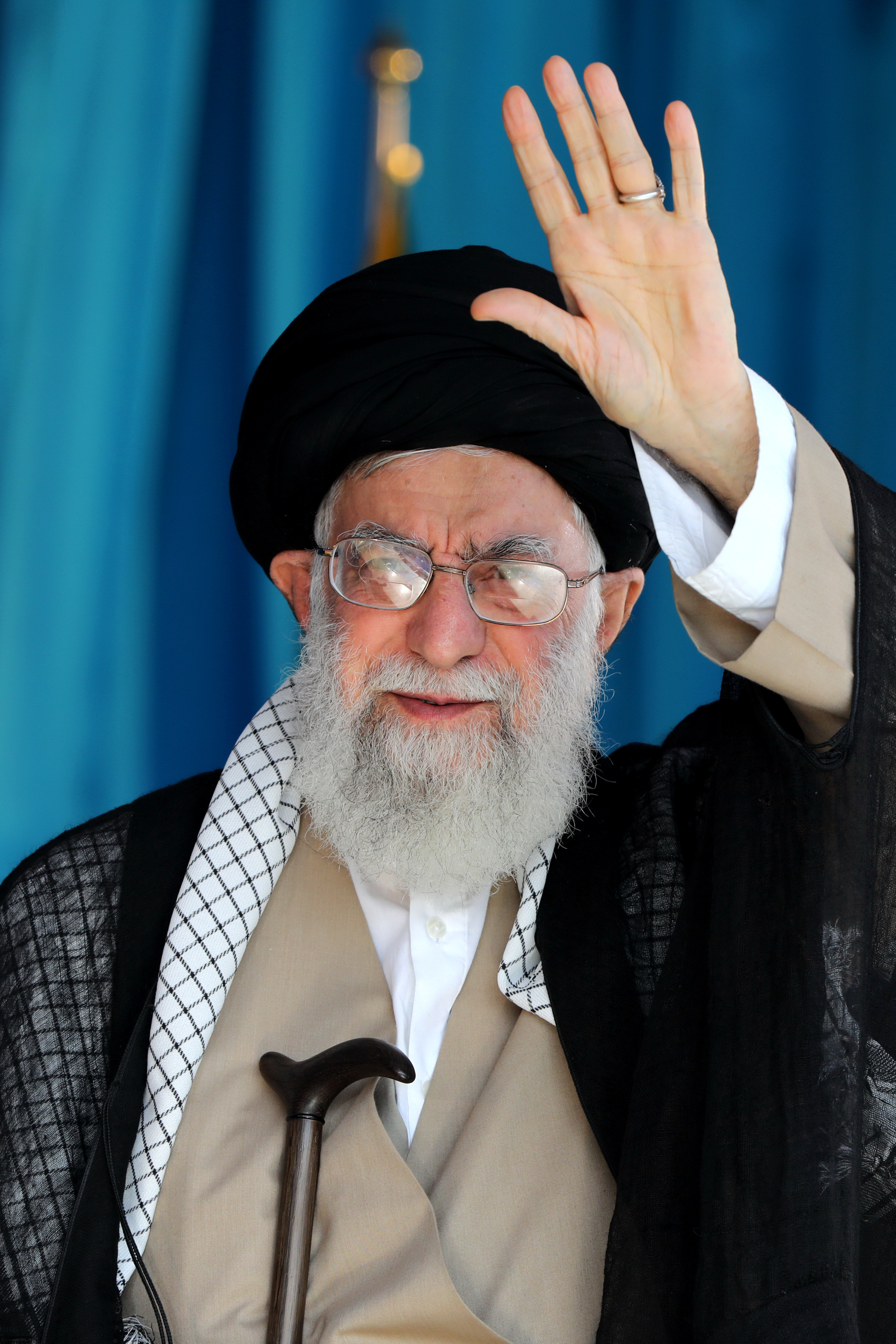
Khamenei at a public speech, 2018

Within Iran, Khamenei was the most powerful political authority. He was the de facto head of state of Iran, the commander-in-chief of its armed forces, and could issue decrees and make the final decisions on the main policies of the government in economy, the environment, foreign policy, and national planning in Iran. As supreme leader, Khamenei had either direct or indirect control over the executive, legislative, and judicial branches of government, as well as the military and media.

Some regarded Khamenei as the figurehead of the country's conservative establishment. Khamenei supported Mesbah Yazdi, describing him as one of Iran's most credible ideologues before the 2005 election but "recently been concerned about Mesbah's political ambitions".

In 2007, Khamenei requested that government officials speed up Iran's move towards economic privatisation. Its last move towards such a goal was in 2004, when Article 44 of the constitution was overturned. Article 44 had decreed that Iran's core infrastructure should remain state-run. Khamenei also suggested that ownership rights should be protected in courts set up by the Justice Ministry; the hope was that this new protection would give a measure of security to and encourage private investment.

On 30 April 2008, Ali Khamenei backed President Mahmoud Ahmadinejad's economic policy and said the West was struggling with more economic difficulties than Iran, with a "crisis" spreading from the United States to Europe, and inflation was a widespread problem. The Iranian leader said that the ongoing economic crisis, which has debilitated the world, has been unprecedented in the past 60 years. He said: "This crisis has forced the UN to declare state of emergency for food shortages around the globe but foreign radios have focused on Iran to imply that the current price hikes and inflation in the country are the results [sic] of carelessness on the part of Iranian officials which of course is not true." Khamenei emphasized that no one has the right to blame the Iranian government for Iran's economic problems. He also advised people and the government to be content and avoid waste to solve economic problems. He added: "I advise you to keep in your mind that this great nation is never afraid of economic sanctions."

=== Foreign policy ===
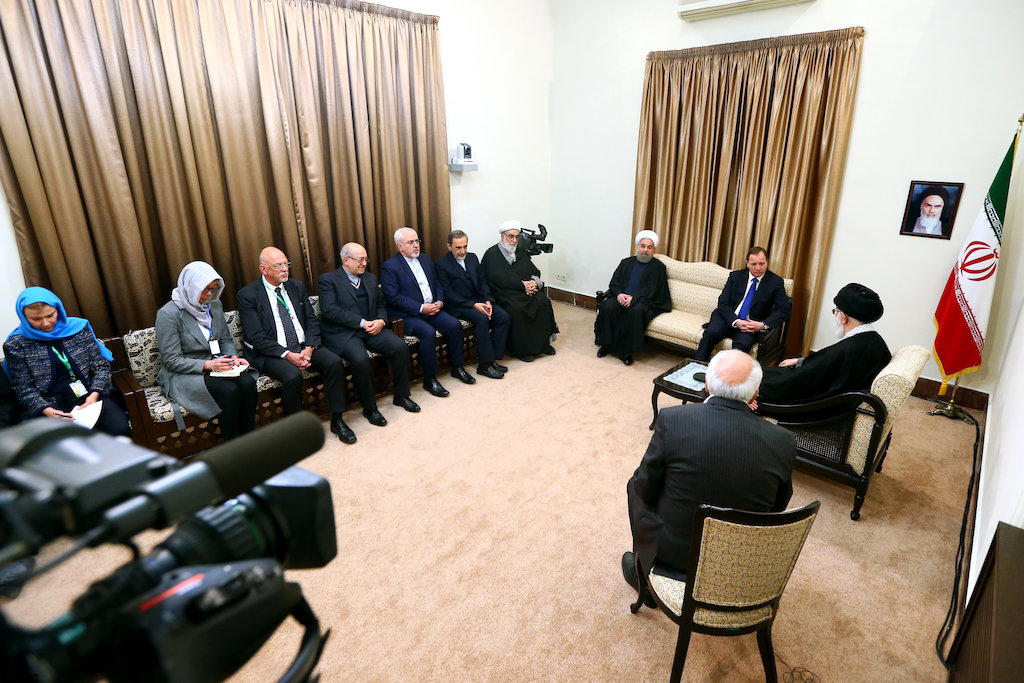
Khamenei with Swedish prime minister Stefan Löfven, February 2017

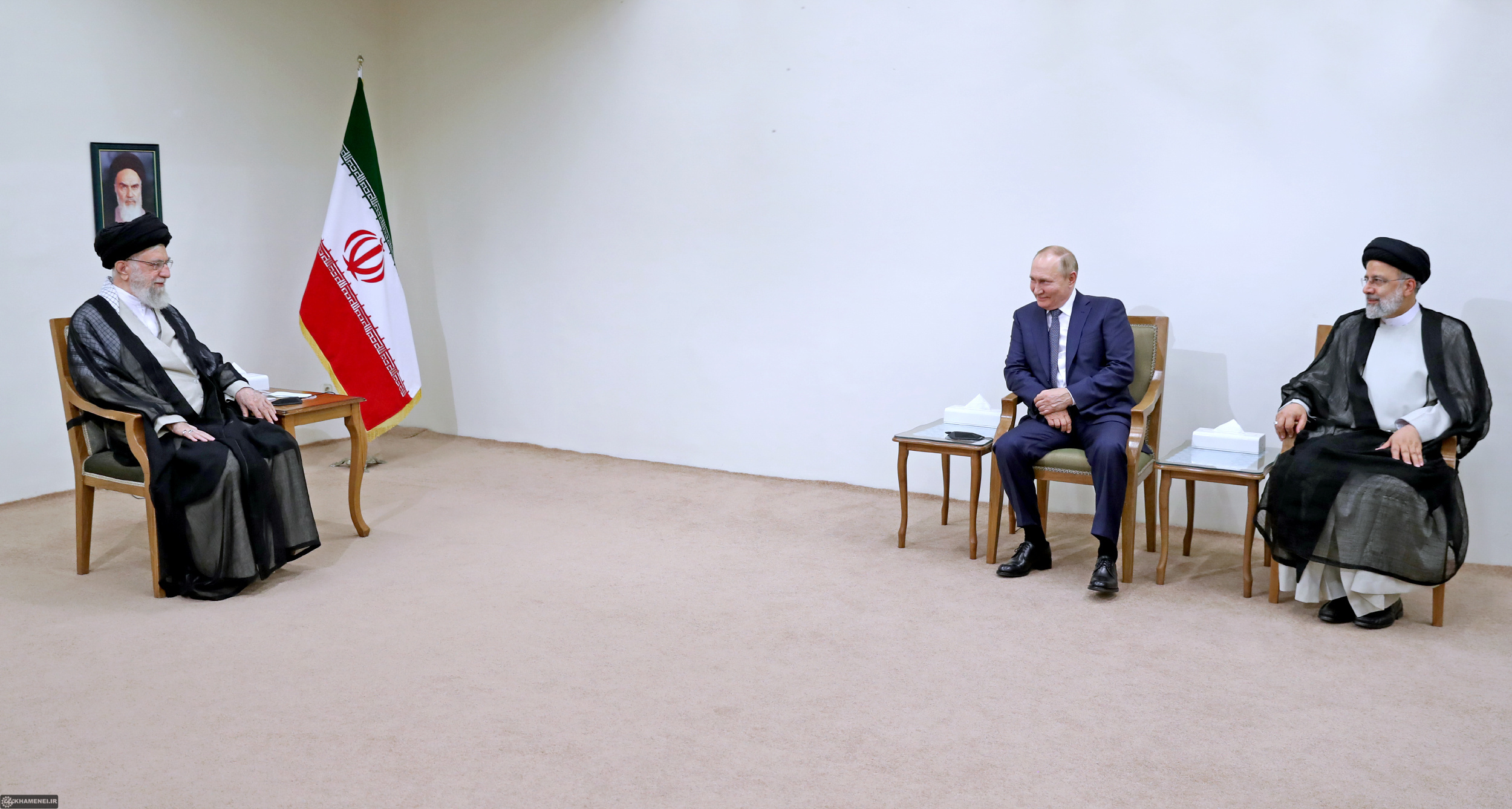
Khamenei and president Ebrahim Raisi (far right) meeting with Russian president Vladimir Putin, July 2022

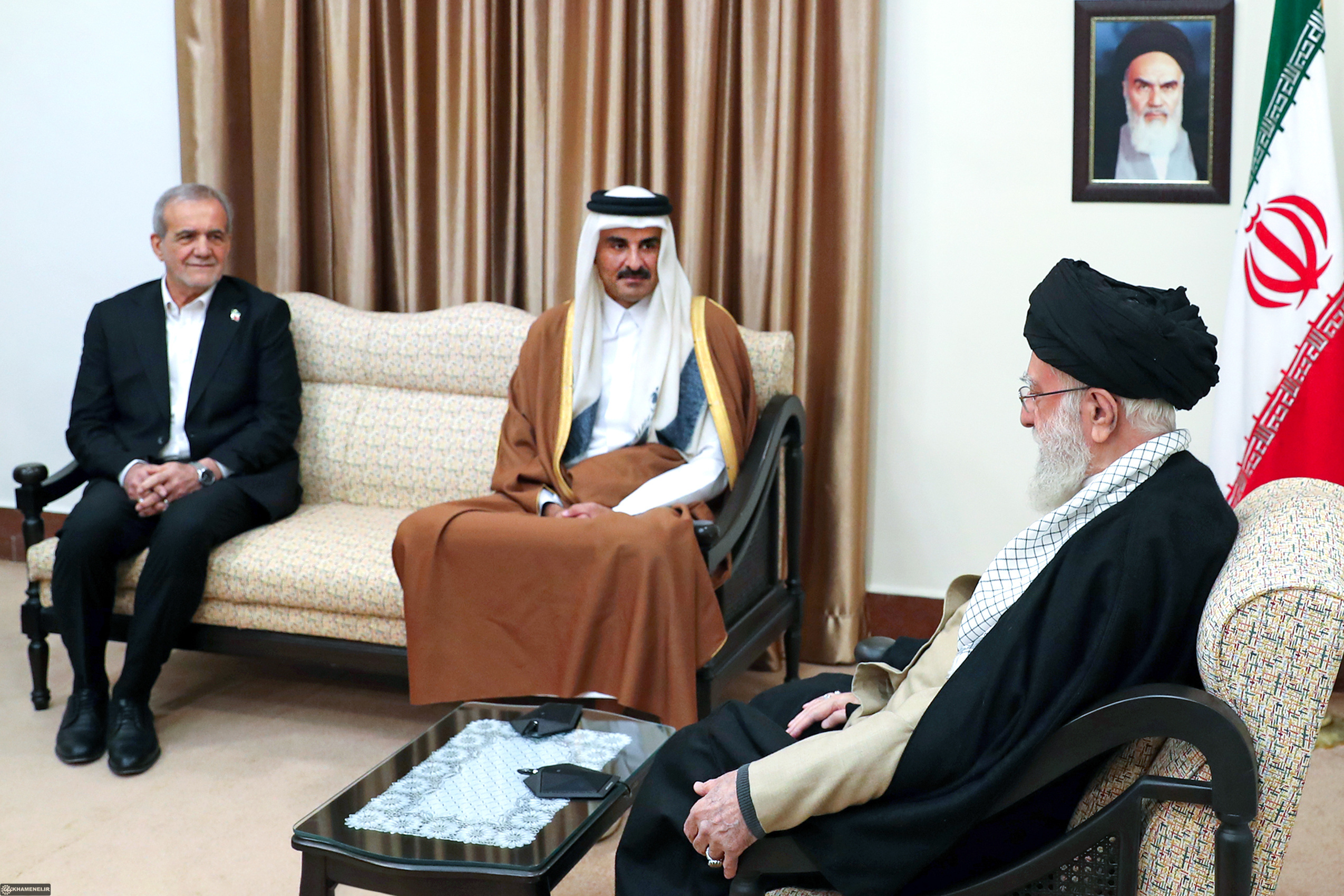
Khamenei and President Masoud Pezeshkian with Qatar's Emir Tamim bin Hamad Al Thani, February 2025

Khamenei had "direct responsibility" for foreign policy, which "cannot be conducted without his direct involvement and approval". He had a foreign policy team independent of the president's, "which include[d] two former foreign ministers", and he could "at any time of his choosing inject himself into the process and 'correct' a flawed policy or decision". His foreign policy was said to steer a course that avoids either confrontation or accommodation with the West.

Khamenei condemned the Saudi Arabian-led intervention in Yemen and compared Saudi Arabia to Israel. Khamenei also condemned the persecution of Rohingya Muslims in Myanmar and called Myanmar's de facto leader and Nobel Peace Prize laureate Aung San Suu Kyi a "brutal woman". He condemned the United Arab Emirates as "useless" on several occasions.

In 2015, Khamenei endorsed the Iran nuclear deal, which restricted Iran's nuclear activities in exchange for sanctions relief. The United States withdrew from the agreement in 2018, and it effectively ended in 2025 after the reimposition of UN sanctions.

After the U.S.'s 2018 withdrawal from the Iran nuclear deal, the 2020 assassination of Qasem Soleimani and the 2021 election of the conservative Ebrahim Raisi (who was supported by Khamenei) as president, Iran has taken a geopolitical course of further aligning with Russia and China. This became more evident in mid-2022 when Iran started supplying its HESA Shahed 136 drones to the Russian Armed Forces to be used against Ukraine. Coupled with Iran's support for attacks on American forces throughout the Middle East after the 2023 October 7 attacks and the decades-long military and nuclear collaboration between North Korea and Iran, these developments have led a number of critics to speak of a new Iran-Russia-China-North Korea "Axis of Upheaval". After Khamenei's assassination, Russian president Vladimir Putin said "In our country, Ayatollah Khamenei will be remembered as an outstanding statesman who made a huge personal contribution to the development of friendly Russian-Iranian relations and brought them to the level of a comprehensive strategic partnership". Khamenei supported the Iranian intervention in the Syrian civil war.

After the September 11 attacks in 2001, Khamenei condemned the act and the attackers, and called for a condemnation of terrorist activities all over the world but warned strongly against a military intervention in Afghanistan. He was quoted as saying, "Mass killings of human beings are catastrophic acts which are condemned wherever they may happen and whoever the perpetrators and the victims may be".

Khamenei denied the Holocaust on multiple occasions.

A 2006 speech of Khamenei contains the phrase that was translated into English as "the myth of the massacre of Jews". In a 2013 interview, Iran's then-Foreign Minister Javad Zarif said Khamenei had been mistranslated, and his comments were taken out of context. Zarif added: "I have spoken to the [Supreme] leader on this issue, he rejects and condemns the killing of innocent people. No, the Holocaust is not a myth."

On 21 March 2014, Khamenei said that "the Holocaust is an event whose reality is uncertain and if it has happened, it's uncertain how it has happened". Because of the potential legal consequences in some countries, he commented: "No one in European countries dares to speak about [the] Holocaust." He also said that in the West, "speaking about [the] Holocaust and expressing doubts about it is considered to be a great sin."

==== Open letters ====
Khamenei wrote several open letters. "To the Youth in Europe and North America" was written on 21 January 2015. Khamenei wrote a second letter to the student protesters at American universities on 30 May 2024. While describing Israel's actions as "genocide and apartheid", Khamenei asked the students to continue their protests against what he called the "brutal Zionist regime". In his letter, Khamenei expressed empathy and solidarity with the students protesting against Israel's attacks in Gaza. He referred to these students as a "branch of the Resistance Front" and predicted their victory with the "permission of God". Khamenei also ran a fundraising campaign for victims of the conflicts in Gaza and Lebanon. Khamenei further wrote an open letter to American students in 2024, which garnered a harsh reaction from the United States. In the letter, he described American students protesting against Israel as a new branch of the Axis of Resistance, and called on them to familiarize themselves with the Quran.

== Human rights, protests, and Islamic law ==
During his life, Khamenei had stated that human rights were a fundamental principle of Islamic teachings and that this preceded the importance other countries' placed on human rights by centuries. (Note: Attributed to multiple sources:) He also separately stated that North American and European nations that criticized Iran on human rights were hypocritical.

=== Protests during leadership ===
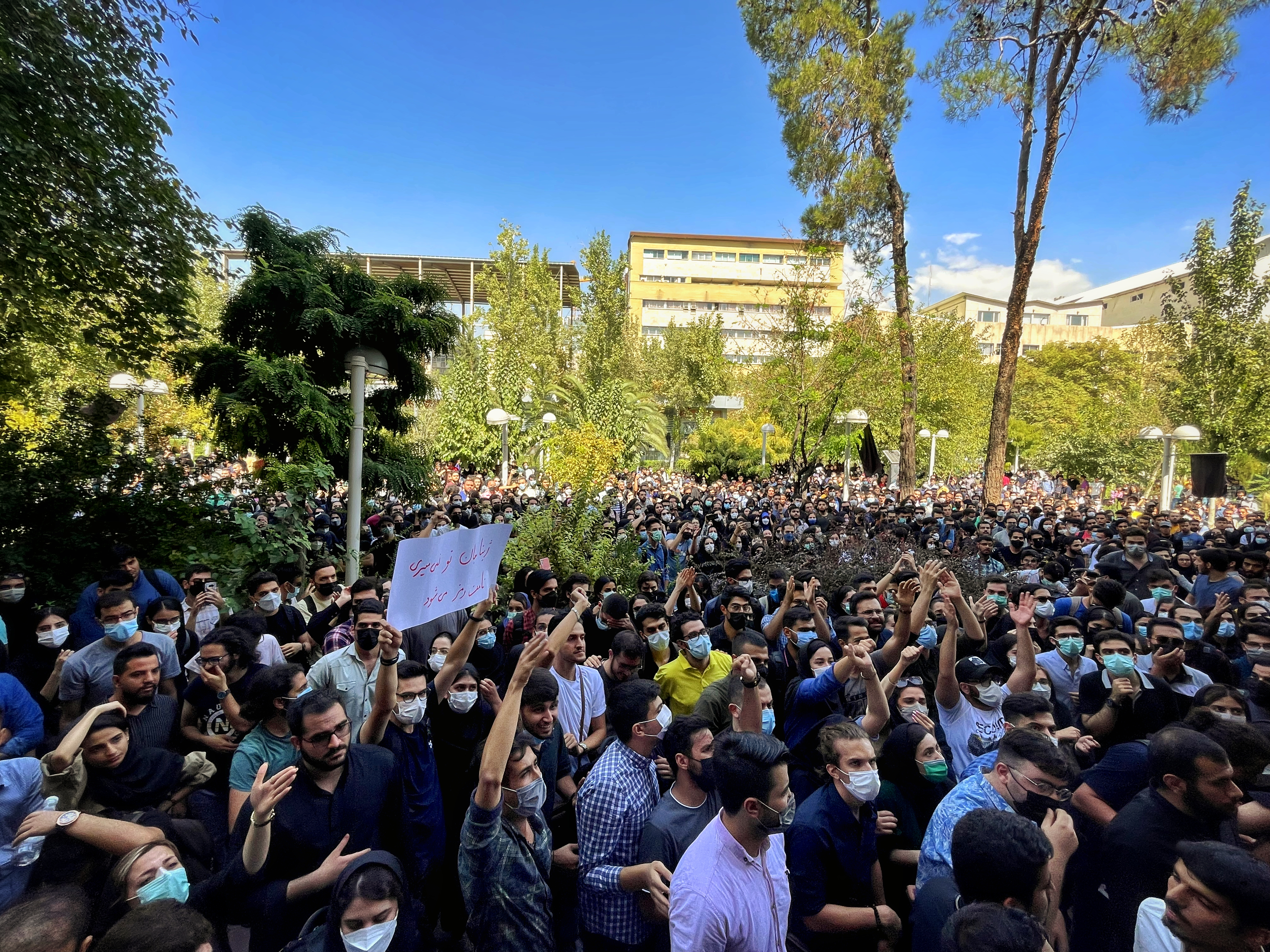
Mahsa Amini protests in Tehran, September 2022

There have been several major protests during Khamenei's reign, including the 1994 Qazvin Protests where according to Al-Arabiya around 40 people were killed and over 400 were injured, the 1999 Iranian student protests, the 2009 Iranian presidential election protests when some protesters chanted "death to the dictator" and ripped down pictures of Khamenei, There were several major protests during Khamenei leadership including the 1999 student protests the 2009 presidential election protests the 2011–2012 protests that followed the Green Movement and resulted in the house arrest of opposition leaders and the 2017–2018 protests described by Reuters as the boldest challenge to Iran's leadership since 2009.

Khamenei was also reportedly linked to the assassination of numerous exiled defectors worldwide, the repression of protesters, the killing of thousands of members of the M.E.K. (People's Mujahedin of Iran) that is recognized as a terrorist organization by Iran and Iraq, and the targeting of dissident writers and intellectuals in Iran, among other alleged human rights violations.

In 2016, Khamenei, who outlined the elections guidelines "in line with Article 110 of Iran's Constitution", asked to maximise the amount of transparency in elections in Iran, using modern technologies. During the Mahshahr massacre, protests expanded against "government corruption, failing institutions, lack of freedoms and the repressive rule of Iran's supreme leader, Ayatollah Ali Khamenei".

During the 2018–2019 Iranian general strikes and protests, Khamenei demanded punishment for those "who disrupt economic security". According to Reuters, the remarks were "clearly intended to send a message to Iranians who may plan more demonstrations".

During the 2019–2020 Iranian protests, Khamenei met with various officials and cabinet members. According to Reuters, "Khamenei said he would hold the assembled officials responsible for the consequences of the protests if they didn't immediately stop them ... [an] official ... added that Khamenei made clear the demonstrations required a forceful response ... [the official said] 'Our Imam ... said those rioters should be crushed'". Some sentences have included lashing and jail time; some have died in custody. During the Ukraine International Airlines Flight 752 protests, thousands of protesters demanded Khamenei's resignation.

During the 2025–2026 protests, there were anti-state protests, with some chanting slogans against Khamenei and the governing bodies and circulating images of protesters burning his portraits on social media; an act considered a serious offense under Iranian law and described as an affront to the country's political and religious authority according to NDTV. During the demonstrations, which occurred amid a nationwide internet blackout, Iranian security forces carried out a mass killings of protesters. Estimates of the death toll as of January 2026 ranged from about 3,117 people according to Iranian government figures to more than 36,500 according to other reports.

On 17 January 2026, Khamenei publicly acknowledged that "several thousand" individuals had died amid recent nationwide protests. He attributed the violence and chaos to "external enemies", specifically the United States and Israel, accusing them of orchestrating the unrest and providing arms to demonstrators. Khemenei also accused the protestors of "including burning more than 250 mosque and medical facilities".

In response to the protests, Khamenei also acknowledged in public remarks that many protesters' economic grievances, such as inflation, the collapsing rial, and hardships faced by shopkeepers, were legitimate. At the same time, he drew a distinction between "protesters" and "rioters." Khamenei emphasised "We talk to protesters, the officials must talk to them," but stated that the "rioters must be put in their place", and he authorized or encouraged a hardline security response.

=== Baháʼí Faith ===
The Baháʼí Faith is the largest religious minority in Iran, with around 300,000 members, is considered a cult by the Iranian government and has been persecuted. Khamenei approved new legislation against Baháʼís in Iran and lessened their influence abroad.

=== Interaction with the press ===
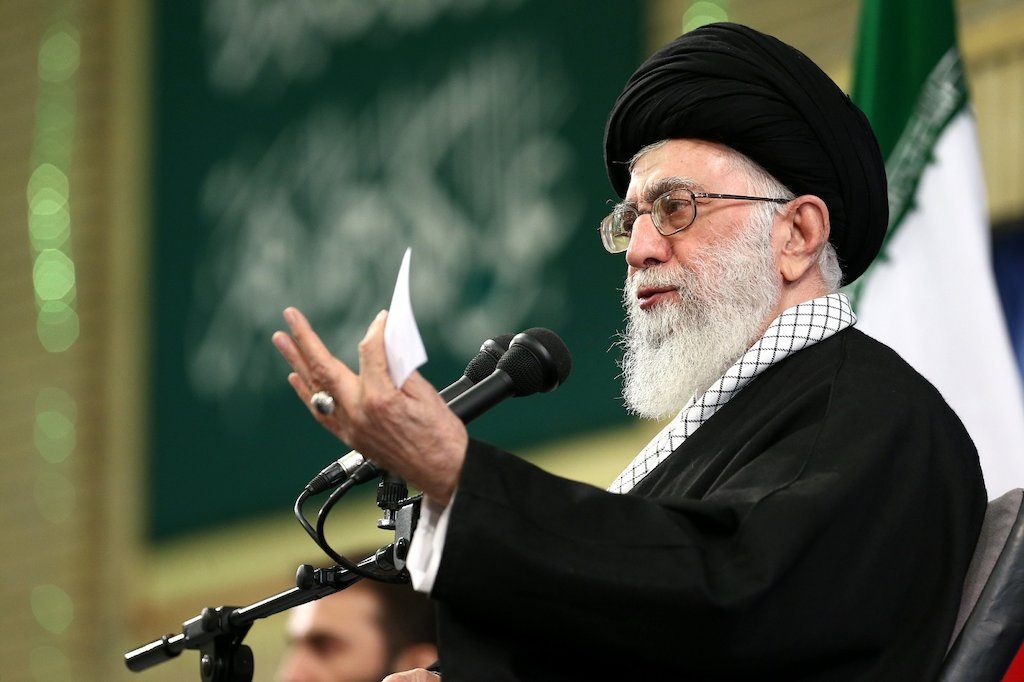
Khamenei speaking to Iranian Air Force personnel, February 2016

In 2000, he was listed by the Committee to Protect Journalists as "one of the top ten enemies of the press and freedom of expression", and was named to the Time 100 in 2007. Opposition journalists Ahmad Zeidabadi, Mohsen Sazegara, Mohammad Nourizad and Akbar Ganji were arrested and investigated for spreading critical articles containing unproven charges against Khamenei's policies as the leader and some organizations.

According to Iran's Press Law "spreading rumors and lies and distorts the words of others" is not allowed. According to the law, "spreading libel against officials, institutions, organizations and individuals in the country or insulting legal or real persons who are lawfully respected, even by means of pictures or caricatures" is not allowed.

In 2000, Ali Khamenei sent a letter to the Iranian parliament forbidding the legislature from debating a revision of the Iranian press law to allow more freedom. (The law had been used "to close more than 20 independent newspapers" from 1997 to 2000.) He wrote: "The present press law has prevented this big plague. The draft bill is not legitimate and in the interests of the system and the revolution." This was called a use of "extra-legislative power" by reformists and opposition groups, but Speaker of Parliament Mehdi Karroubi reminded deputies that "the constitution contained "elements of the absolute rule of the supreme clerical leader"."

Kayhan and Jomhuri-ye Eslami were two newspapers published under the management of Khamenei. Among his controversial actions were his rejection of a bill presented by the Iranian parliament in 2000 that aimed to reform the country's press law, and the disqualification of thousands of parliamentary candidates for the 2004 Iranian legislative election by the Guardian Council he appointed. In 2012, 2013, and 2014, Forbes selected Khamenei as the 21st, 23rd, and 19th most powerful person in the world, respectively, in their list of The World's Most Powerful People.

=== Trials of people for insulting Khamenei ===
Several journalists, bloggers, and other individuals were put on trial in Iran for insulting the supreme leader, often in conjunction with blasphemy charges. In 1996, Abbas Maroufi was sentenced to 35 lashes and six months imprisonment for spreading lies and insulting Khamenei. Maroufi was also banned from working as a journalist and his literary monthly Gardoon was closed. Maroufi had compared Khamenei to former Shah of Iran Mohammad Reza Pahlavi.

In 2005, an Iranian was jailed for two years for insulting Khamenei and Imam Khomeini while being cleared of insulting Muhammad. In 2009, Iranian blogger Omid Reza Mir Sayafi, who was arrested for insulting Khamenei in an internet post, died while in custody in Evin Prison. In 2010, opposition activist Ahmad Gabel was sentenced to 20 months in jail for insulting Khamenei, as well as 3 additional years for possessing a satellite receiver, a 3-year exile and a fine. In 2014, eight men, including a Briton, were sentenced to 19 to 20 years for insulting Khamenei and other charges relating to Facebook comments.

=== Women's and LGBTQ rights ===
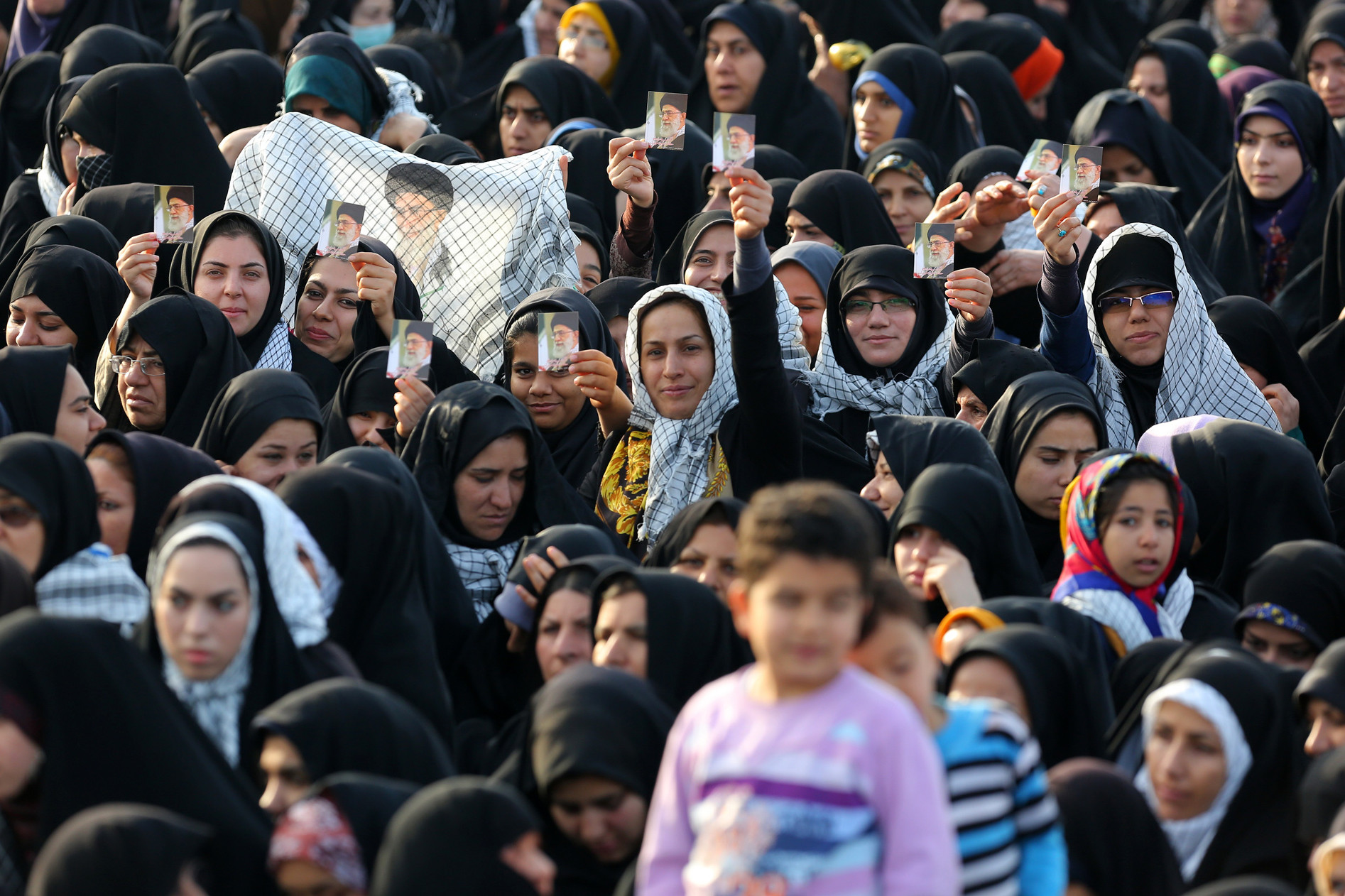
Iranian women with portraits of Khamenei, 2014

Khamenei, like his predecessor Khomeini, stated that women may participate in political, cultural, and social activities and promoted their involvement as intellectuals, scientists, activists, speakers, and contributors to public life.

Khamenei spoke out against denying women access to education, ethical development, personal choice in marriage, family bonds, or the opportunity to develop talents in fields such as science, politics, and social work calling it "oppression". He emphasized that women should be allowed to develop their abilities and awareness according to their capacities and circumstances.

In July 2007, Khamenei criticized Iranian women's rights activists and the Convention on the Elimination of All Forms of Discrimination Against Women (CEDAW). He said: "In our country ... some activist women, and some men, have been trying to play with Islamic rules to match international conventions related to women. This is wrong." Khamenei made these comments two days after Iranian women's rights activist Delaram Ali was sentenced to 34 months of jail and ten lashes by Iran's judiciary.

Khamenei believed in gender segregation. Khamenei also believed that gender equality was a Zionist plot with the purpose to "corrupt the role of women in society".

Khamenei advocated the Islamic practice of hijab, believing that hijab is aimed at honoring women. To the Western objections regarding compulsory hijab in Iran, he responded by pointing out the compulsory unveiling in certain Western countries and obstacles created for veiled Muslim women who want to enter universities. He further argued that women in the West have lost their honor by pointing out a perceived high rate of sexual violence in the West as well as the widespread exploitation of female sexual appeal for commercial purposes.

Khamenei believed homosexuality was a "moral deprivation" present in the West, but supported Khomeini's 1985 fatwa permitting sex reassignment surgery for gender dysphoria.

== Personal life ==
Khamenei was married to Mansoureh Khojasteh Bagherzadeh, with whom he had six children; four sons (Mostafa, Mojtaba, Masoud, and Meysam) and two daughters (Boshra and Hoda). One of his sons, Mojtaba, married a daughter of Gholam-Ali Haddad-Adel. His eldest son, Mostafa, is married to a daughter of Azizollah Khoshvaght. Another son, Masoud, is married to the daughter of Mohsen Kharazi. One of his daughters, Boshra, married a son of Mohammad Mohammadi Golpayegani, while his other daughter, Hoda, was married to a son of Mohammad-Bagher Bagheri Kani. He had three brothers, including Mohammad Khamenei and Hadi Khamenei. One of his four sisters, Badri Khamenei, wife of dissident Ali Tehrani, fled into exile in the 1980s.

As Supreme Leader, Khamenei moved to a house in Central Tehran on Palestine Street. A compound that grew around it now contains around fifty buildings. Around 500 people are employed at this "Beit Rahbari compound" according to The Telegraph, and "many recruited from the military and security services".

=== Health ===
Khamenei's health was repeatedly the subject of speculation. In January 2007, rumors spread of his illness or death after he had not been seen in public for some weeks and had not appeared as he traditionally did at celebrations for Eid al-Adha. Khamenei issued a statement declaring that "enemies of the Islamic system fabricated various rumors about death and health to demoralize the Iranian nation", but according to the author Hooman Majd, he appeared to be "visibly weak" in photos released with the statement.

In September 2014, he underwent prostate surgery, which state media described as a routine medical procedure. According to a report by Le Figaro, Western intelligence sources claimed in 2015 that Khamenei had prostate cancer with two years left to live. In September 2022, it was reported that Khamenei underwent surgery for a bowel obstruction and temporarily canceled several scheduled meetings.

=== Lifestyle ===
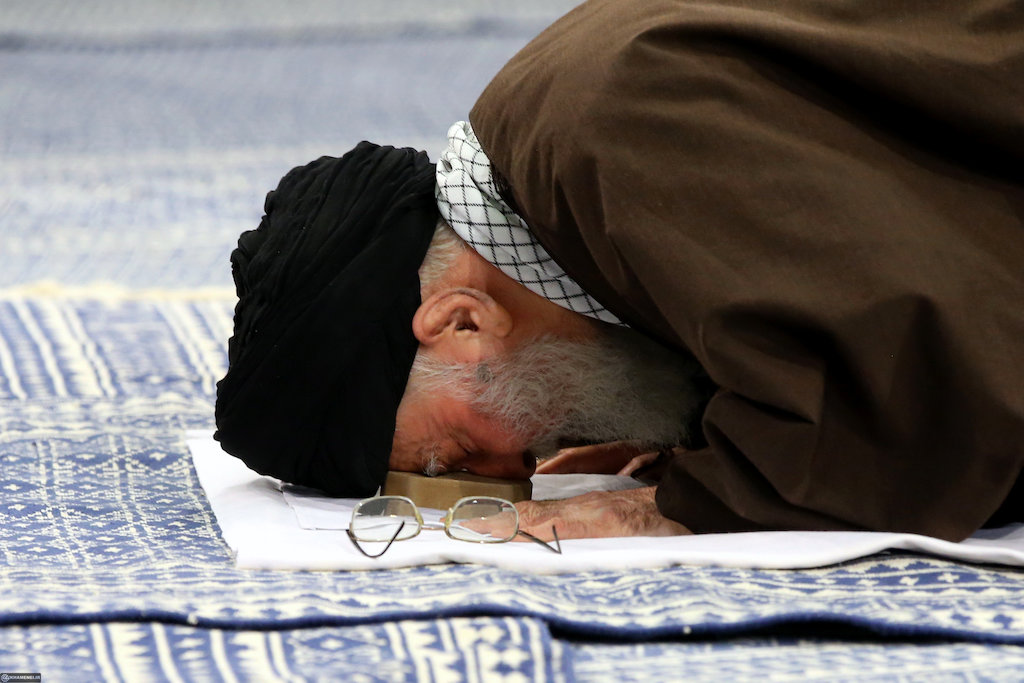
Khamenei prays with a turbah in 2017. Doing salah this way is specific to Shia Islam.

According to Mehdi Khalaji, an Iran expert at the Washington Institute for Near East Policy, Khamenei had a decent life "without it being luxurious". Robert Tait of The Daily Telegraph commented that Khamenei was "renowned for a spartan lifestyle". Dexter Filkins described Khamenei as presenting himself "as an ascetic, dressing and eating simply". In an interview with a women's magazine, his wife declared that "we do not have decorations, in the usual sense. Years ago, we freed ourselves from these things".

On the other hand, Mother Nature Network reported in 2016 that Khamenei was seen riding around in a BMW car and published a picture of him exiting one. Khamenei, often seen as stern, enjoyed poetry, gardening, and once smoked a pipe – unusual for a cleric. Despite his absolute power, he led a modest life, rarely leaving Iran, and was pictured happily tending his garden with a simple plastic watering can.

=== Literature and art ===
Khamenei developed a reputation as an avant-garde cleric, reflecting interests and personal habits that diverged from conventional expectations within the religious establishment. In addition to his appreciation for music and modern Persian poetry, he was noted for driving a Volkswagen and smoking a pipe, details that were sometimes cited as indicative of a comparatively unconventional lifestyle. According to accounts from relatives, he maintained a sustained interest in arts and culture throughout his life. He read Iranian and foreign novels as well as historical works, and watched international films. His intellectual engagement was described by some observers as contributing to a reputation for being cultured and well-read, including among certain political opponents.

In 1988, while serving as President of Iran, Khamenei delivered a speech titled The Splendor of the Persian Language and the Need to Protect It. In this address, he described language as a fundamental and defining element of cultural identity across nations and characterized Persian as "the language of true revolutionary Islam". He also drew a comparison between Persian and Arabic, arguing for the expressive richness of Persian and questioning the extent to which the poetry of Hafez, the 14th-century poet, could be adequately translated into Arabic. In Mashhad, he used to participate in literary associations along with known poets and used to critique poems; he himself wrote some poetry under the pseudonym Amin. Khamenei supported revising Persian by replacing loanwords with newly coined terms, including rayansphere for cyberspace, radian for radio, and televisan for television.

Khamenei stated that "poetry must be the vanguard of the caravan of the [Islamic] revolution ... [T]hrough the arts and literature, the revolution can be exported more easily and honestly." It has been suggested (by Dexter Filkins) that this may have explained his interest in banning books, prohibiting newspapers and imprisoning artists.

Khamenei expressed interest in studying novels and stories since childhood and studied various novels of the world. He was "fascinated by Jean-Paul Sartre and Bertrand Russell" in his youth. He praised the works of Mikhail Sholokhov, Aleksey N. Tolstoy, Honoré de Balzac, and Michel Zévaco. He said that Victor Hugo's Les Misérables is "the best novel that has been written in history". He explained:

I've read The Divine Comedy. I have read Amir Arsalan. I have also read A Thousand and One Nights ... [But] Les Misérables is a miracle in the novel writing world ... I have repeatedly said, go read Les Misérables once. This Les Misérables is a book of sociology, a book of history, a book of criticism, [a] divine book, a book of love and feeling.

Khamenei suggested reading The Grapes of Wrath to "an audience of writers and artists" and Uncle Tom's Cabin to the high-level state managers as he thought it shed light on the history of the United States:

Isn't this the government that massacred the original native inhabitants of the land of America? That wiped out the American Indians? ... Today, one of the most tragic works of art is Uncle Tom's Cabin ... This book still lives after almost 200 years.

Khamenei was fluent in Arabic in addition to his native languages, Persian and Azerbaijani. He translated several books into Persian from Arabic, including the works of the Egyptian political theorist Sayyid Qutb.

In late 1996, following a fatwa by Khamenei stating that music education corrupts the minds of young children and is against Islam, many music schools were closed and music instruction to children under the age of 16 was banned by public establishments (although private instruction continued). However, Khamenei was also known to have a good singing voice and played the tar, a traditional Iranian stringed instrument.

== Assassination ==
Tomb of Khamenei and his relatives at the Imam Reza Shrine

On 28 February 2026, a series of large-scale US and Israeli missile strikes were carried out against targets in Iran, inaugurating the 2026 Iran war. Khamenei was reported to have been killed in his office in an attack carried out by the Israeli Air Force on his compound. Later that day, Reuters published a report of an unnamed Israeli official who claimed Khamenei's body had been found, and that he had died. Israeli prime minister Benjamin Netanyahu and US president Donald Trump also said that Khamenei had died. Iranian state media confirmed Khamenei's death at around 5:00 am Iran Standard Time on 1 March 2026. (Note: Fars news agency reported the deaths of his daughter, son-in-law, daughter-in-law, and grandchild after the strikes)

The Israeli Air Force used 50 aircraft and more than 100 munitions in a synchronized attack to target Khamenei's bunker, known as Habib Ebrahimi, constructed by the Islamic Revolutionary Guard Corps starting in 2009 as deep as 30 to 35 metres (98 to 115 ft) below ground, with a network of access and escape tunnels connecting to points across central Tehran. The site was targeted based on intelligence about the site and Khamenei's presence there gathered by intelligence units 8200 and 9900 of the Israel Defense Forces.

His state funeral commenced on 3 July 2026, after delays caused by the war with the US and Israel. His body was transported throughout Iran and Iraq, before his burial at the Imam Reza Shrine in his hometown of Mashhad. Millions attended his funeral.

== Works ==
The published works of Ali Khamenei include authored monographs, translations, and a large number of compiled volumes of speeches, messages, and lectures issued by institutions affiliated with his office. A major institutional corpus is published by the Office for the Preservation and Publication of the Works of Ayatollah Khamenei, through Islamic Revolution Publications, and distributed in digital form by the Computer Research Center of Islamic Sciences (Noorsoft). According to a Noorsoft product entry for the compilation Hadith-e Velayat (A Collection of the Statements and Messages of the Supreme Leader), this series alone comprises 121 book titles in 208 volumes, covering materials from 1979 to 2020. Some of his works include:

- Four Main Books of Rijal
- An Outline of Islamic Thought in the Quran
- Honest Leader
- Discourse on Patience (translation by Sayyid Hussein Alamdar, available online)
- Iqbal – Manifestation of the Islamic Spirit, Two Contemporary Muslim Views
  - Iqbal, the Poet-Philosopher of Islamic Resurgence is one of the "Two Contemporary Muslim Views", the other one is Ali Shariati's.
- Replies to Inquiries about the Practical Laws of Islam (PDF version)
- Lessons from the Nahjul-Balaghah
- Human Rights in Islam
- The Charter of Freedom
- Essence of Tawhid: Denial of Servitude but to God

Translations from Arabic:

- Sayyid Qutb's Future in the Realm of Islam

Collections:

- A 250 Years Old Person
- Palestine

== See also ==
- Abdallah Mazandarani
- Fazlullah Nouri
- Hibatullah Akhundzada
- Islamic Government (book by Khomeini)
- Mirza Ali Aqa Tabrizi
- Mirza Husayn Tehrani
- Mirza Sayyed Mohammad Tabatabai
- Motto of years in Islamic Republic of Iran
- Muhammad Kazim Khurasani
- Seyyed Abdollah Behbahani

== Bibliography ==
- Sadiki, Larbi (2014). Routledge Handbook of the Arab Spring: Rethinking Democratisation. Routledge. ISBN 978-1-317-65004-1.

Political offices
New office	Deputy Minister of National Defence for Revolutionary Affairs; 1979–1980	Office abolished
Preceded by Mohammad-Ali Rajai	President of Iran; 1981–1989	Succeeded by Akbar Hashemi Rafsanjani
New office	Chairperson of the Expediency Discernment Council; 1988–1989	Succeeded by Akbar Hashemi Rafsanjani
Preceded by Ruhollah Khomeini	Supreme Leader of Iran; 1989–2026	Succeeded by Mojtaba Khamenei
Military offices
Preceded by Ruhollah Khomeini	Commander-in-Chief of the Iranian Armed Forces; 1989–2026	Succeeded by Vacant
Preceded by Fereydoun Kian	Supervisor of the Islamic Revolutionary Guard Corps; 1979–1980	Succeeded by Abbas Duzduzani
Party political offices
Preceded by Mohammad-Javad Bahonar	Secretary-General of the Islamic Republican Party; 1981–1987	Party dissolved
Preceded by Mohammad-Ali Rajai	Islamic Republican Party nominee for President of Iran; October 1981; 1985	Party dissolved
Religious titles
Preceded by Hussein-Ali Montazeri	Tehran's Friday Prayer Imam; 1980–2026	Succeeded by Vacant
Academic offices
New office	President of the Encyclopedia Islamica Foundation; 1983–2026	Succeeded by Vacant
