= Abbas Amirifar =

Iranian cleric

Hojjatoleslam Abbas Amirifar (born 1957) is the prayer leader of Iranian president Mahmoud Ahmadinejad and head of the presidential cultural committee. He was arrested in May 2011 on charges of "sorcery", after he produced a controversial film predicting the imminent return of the Mahdi, (the title of which—Zohur Besyar Nazdik Ast—has been translated as "Appearance is Close!"). According to Radio Zamaneh, he was "referred to the Special Court for the Clergy for his involvement in the production and distribution" of the film, as well as for "disturbing public minds and insulting political groups and figures." The arrest is thought to be part of a dispute between the president and other conservatives, including the supreme leader. "At least 25" supporters of Ahmadinejad have been arrested in 2011, including Mohammed Sharif Malekzadeh and Kazem Kiapasha.

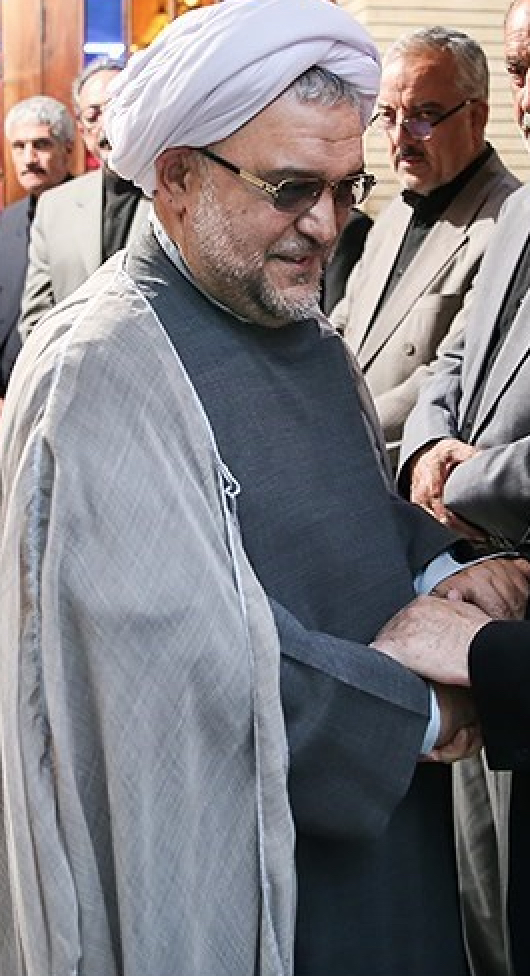
Hojjatoleslam Abbas Amirifar attending a funeral service.

== See also ==
- Mahmoud Ahmadinejad
- Esfandiar Rahim Mashaei
- Mohammed Sharif Malekzadeh
