= Iran Slogan of the Year =

Annual Iranian motto

Naming the motto of the year in Iran is done by the Supreme Leader Ali Khamenei every new year in Nowruz. The first instance began in 1999, where he selected the "title of the year".

After the assassination of Ali Khamenei in the 2026 Iran war, the next supreme leader of Iran, his son, Mojtaba Khamenei, sets the slogan of the years from now on.

== 1990–1999 ==
The Supreme Leader announces the title of the new year by messages broadcast on IRIB TV in New Year's Eve.

- 1990: Emphasis on "Internal Transformation and Reform"
- 1991: Emphasis on "Bright Morning"
- 1992: Emphasis on "Strengthening Spirituality"
- 1993: Emphasis on "Social Justice"
- 1994: Emphasis on "Saving"
- 1995: Emphasis on "Work Ethics, Social Discipline, Economic order"
- 1996: Emphasis on the "Necessity of Avoiding waste and Preserving the Wealth and Public Resources of the Country"
- 1997: Emphasis on "Attention to Spirituality and Moral Virtues"
- 1998: Emphasis on "Saving and avoiding Al-Kabirah اسراف luxury(waste), contentment and standing on Islamic and revolutionary positions"
- 1999: Year of Imam Khomeini, in honor of 100 years since the birth of the founder of the Islamic Republic

== 2000–2009 ==
- 2000: Year of Imam Ali
- 2001: National authority and job creation, (Name recommended by Mohammad Khatami then Iranian President)
- 2002: Greatness and Imam Hossein Pride
- 2003: Serve
- 2004: Year of Answering (Government ministries answered people's questions)
- 2005: National correlation and public cooperation
- 2006: Year of Great Prophet Mohammad (possibly named in relation to Jyllands-Posten Muhammad cartoons controversy)
- 2007: Year of National Unity and Islamic Coherence
- 2008: Innovation and flourishing (30 year anniversary of revolution)
- 2009: Moving toward reforming consumption

== 2010–2021 ==
- 2010: Extra willing, extra work
- 2011: Economic jihad (name selected due to Iranian subsidy reform plan, and mounting international sanctions)
- 2012: National production and supporting Iranian capital and businesses
- 2013: Political and economic epic
- 2014: Economy and culture, through national will and jihadi management
- 2015: Government and people, Empathy and compassion
- 2016: Resisting economy: action and work
- 2017: Resisting economy: production – job creation
- 2018: Supporting Iranian products
- 2019: Production prosperity
- 2020: Jumping production
- 2021: Production, supports and barriers removing

== 2022–2026 ==
- 2022: Production, science based, job creation
- 2023: Curbing inflation, growing production
- 2024: Boost production through peoples help
- 2025: Investment for production
- 2026: Resistance Economy in light of National Unity and National Security
