= Fereydoun Kian =

Iranian military officer

- Military career
- Allegiance: Iran
- Branch: Army
- Rank: Lieutenant colonel
- Commands: Islamic Revolutionary Guard Corps

Fereydoun Kian (Persian: فریدون کیان) was an Iranian military officer with regular military (Artesh) background who served as the acting commander of the Islamic Revolutionary Guard Corps for a short period of time in late 1979, during its early formative phase.

Military offices
Preceded by Hassan Lahouti	Supervisor of the Islamic Revolutionary Guard Corps; 1979	Succeeded by Ali Khamenei
