= Mohammed Sharif Malekzadeh =

Iranian politician

Mohammad Sharif Malekzadeh
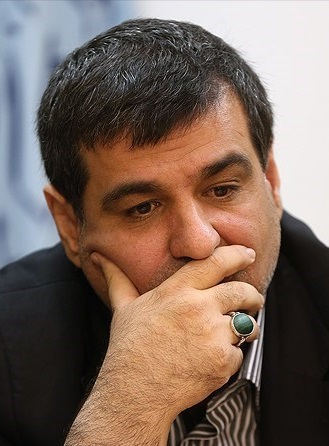

Vice President of Iran Head of Cultural Heritage and Tourism Organization
- In office 2012–2013
- President: Mahmoud Ahmadinejad
- Preceded by: Mir-Hassan Mousavi
- Succeeded by: Mohammad-Ali Najafi

Personal details
- Born: Zabol, Sistan and Baluchestan Province, Iran
- Profession: Politician; University lecturer
- Website: https://specialinteresttourism.ir/english

Mohammad Sharif Malekzadeh (born in Zabul city, Sistan and Baluchistan province) is a former Vice President of Iran who served as the head of the Ministry of Cultural Heritage, Handicrafts and Tourism from 2012 to 2013.

== Career ==
Malekzadeh has a doctorate in management and a post-doctorate in management. He is an associate professor of the university, advisor to Seyyed Mahmoud Hashemi Shahroudi in executive affairs,[1] and until the end of the 9th government vice president and head of the cultural heritage organization, handicrafts, and tourism.[2]

He has previously held various government positions. Among them are advisor to the president;[3] advisor to the minister of foreign affairs, special assistant to the minister of foreign affairs, administrative and financial deputy of the ministry of foreign affairs,[4] general secretary of Iranians abroad[5]. He is currently the head of the Center for Research and Studies of Humanities-Islamic Sciences, the head of the World Halal Tourism Organization, and the head of the International Union of World University Presidents.[2][Requires Source]

In 2020, Malekzadeh was chosen as the Father of the Contemporary Science of World Tourism Management by the World University Presidents Association; he was named as one of the world's top 3000 scientists by Word Press magazine.

Malekzadeh was awarded the National Medal of Service and Sheikh Baha'i Medal, as the creator of MFT theory.

== Accomplishments ==
- Vice President of Tourism Organization of Cultural Heritage, Handicrafts and Tourism
- Vice President and Head of Cultural Heritage, Handicrafts and Tourism Organization
- The manager responsible for scientific and research quarterly magazine of management and development
- Member of the executive council and head of the Central Asia and Middle East region of the International Union of Deans of Islamic World Universities
- Director General of Foreign Nationals and Iranians Abroad, Judiciary
- Adviser to the President and Secretary General of Iranian Affairs Abroad
- The inventor of the MFT theory about the effects of improving the world tourism industry
- Special Assistant to the Minister of Foreign Affairs
- Head of the Higher Institute of Education, Research, Management, and Planning
- Former Vice President of Iran and Head of Cultural Heritage, Handicrafts, and Tourism Organization of Iran
- The father of the modern science of world tourism
- One of the top 3,000 scientists in the world
- The first inventor in the world tourism industry with a patent: process management and quality control in tourism tours with special interests
- Author of 40 books in the field of the global economy, management, and tourism
- Selection of the title of Iran's celebrities and celebrities in 2015 by the Association of Cultural Artifacts and Celebrities of the country
- Senior Advisor at President University of Indonesia
- Chairman of the Board of Directors of the Global Halal Tourism Organization (GHTO), London
- Head of the Office of the International Association of Presidents of World Universities (IAUP) in the Middle East and Central Asia region.
- Awarded the national service badge
- Awarded the national badge of Sheikh Baha'i
- The founder and father of the modern science of world tourism management
- Specialized doctorate in industrial management
- University professor in the field of industrial management
- The manager of a scientific research quarterly journal of management and development
- The manager of a scientific research quarterly journal of planning and budgeting
- The head of the management groups of Iran Higher Educational and Research Institute and Management and Planning
- Director of the Department of Graduate Studies in Public Administration, Tehran Branch, Center
- Chairman of the Board of Trustees of the Cultural Heritage Research Institute
- Member of the board of trustees and International Vice President and Academic Vice President of Adalat University

== Works ==
- Resistance economy and JCPOA
- Dimensions of resistance economy in the oil industry
- Transferring experience from past managers to the future
- What board members should know
- What mayors should know
- What senior managers need to know
- Comprehensive banking
- The impact of information technology on the education system
- Development of management in Dana insurance - challenges and solutions
- Economic facilitation and development solutions
- Burnout / Career Exhaustion
- Poverty and economic inequality
- Strategic management of social responsibility
- Management of assignments in the field of health
- The scientific unveiling ceremony of the first invention in the tourism industry
- Corporate social responsibility in the oil industry
- The success of female managers in the family
- A look at the life and works of Dr. Mohammad Sharif Malekzadeh
- New newspaper
- Certificate of honor of Iran
- Halal tourism conference

== Sources ==
- http://www.tasnimnews.com/fa/news/1391/09/11/2013/
- http://www.khabaronline.ir/detail/209483/Politics/4562
- http://www.entekhab.ir/fa/news/28914/
- Archived Version, from the original on August 18, 2016. Retrieved 31 July 2016.
- Collection of articles and lectures of the international conference on halal economy and halal tourism, Mehr 2016, p. 12
- http://www.hamshahrionline.ir/details/192950
