= Noureddin Esheni Qudejani =

Iranian Shi'a scholar of the 20th century

- نورالدین اشنی قودجانی
- Born: 1903 (1321 AH); Eshen, Najafabad County, Isfahan Province, Iran
- Died: October 14, 1978 (Dhu al-Qadah 12, 1398 AH); Isfahan, Iran
- Burial place: Kalbasi Tekyeh in Takht-e Foulad cemetery
- Education: Ijtihad level of Islamic seminary
- Occupations: Islamic scholar; Faqih; Preacher and orator; Lawyer
- Father: Mohammad Hossein Esheni Qudejani

Noureddin Esheni Qudejani or Noureddin Qudejani Esheni (1903 – October 14, 1978) was an Iranian Shia cleric, famous preacher and orator of Isfahan, Faqih, lawyer and professor of Isfahan Seminary. He was the famous Salah al jama'ah imam of the Seyyed Mosque of Isfahan. He was one of the modernist clerics and the first cleric to study law and become a lawyer.

== ‌Birth ==
Noureddin Esheni Qudejani was born in 1903 (1321 AH) in the village of Eshen in Najafabad County, Isfahan Province, Iran. His father was Mohammad Hossein Esheni Qudejani. He was born in the family of science, ijtihad, and the house of virtue and morality, so he was educated and guided by his parents, and the ground was laid for his progress in the later stages. Seyyed Mosleh al-Din Mahdavi (famous Iranian researcher and historian) mentions Noureddin Esheni Qudejani 's birthplace in Najaf.

== Educations ==
He began his education with his scientist father Mohammad Hossein Esheni Qudejani and at the same time, used the presence of great Islamic scholars of Isfahan. Among his teachers in Isfahan are the great Islamic scholars: Seyyed Mohammad Bagher Dorchehie, Sheikh Mohammad Reza Najafi, Sheikh Mohammad Hakim Khorasani. His other teacher, especially in the Islamic seminary levels and in the literature, was Jalaluddin Homaei.

Considering the years that Noureddin Esheni Qudejani was studying in Isfahan, it can be guessed that he studied under the great figures such as Mir Seyyed Ali Najafabadi and Mir Seyyed Mohammad Najafabadi and great masters such as: Rahim Arbab, Abu l-Huda Kalbasi,> Seyyed Abu l-Qasim Dihkurdi Isfahani and Mir Mohammad Sadegh Khatunabadi. Noureddin Esheni Qudejani, after using the presence of Isfahan scholars, went to the seminary of Qom and studied under its famous founder, Abdul-Karim Haeri Yazdi and also studied under the great muhaddith jurist Seyyed Mohammad Hojjat Kooh Kamari. Then he went to Tehran and benefited a lot from the mystic jurist Mohammad Ali Shahabadi.

While studying in Qom, Noureddin Esheni Qudejani succeeded in obtaining permission for ijtihad from Abdul-Karim Haeri Yazdi, the document of which is available to his family.

== His contemporaries ==
Noureddin Esheni Qudejani has been both a period and a debate with many of the great contemporary scholars and jurists of recent times. In the lecture hall of Jalaluddin Homaei, in courses which was held in Jarchi Mosque and 70 to 80 participant from people of Isfahan regularly attended it, Noureddin Esheni Qudejani participated in it and there he discussed and exchanged ideas with scholars like Seyyed Hassan Modarres Bidabadi (a Shiite scholar), Morteza Ardakani Yazdi (a Shiite scholar) and Abbas Ali Adib Habibabadi (a Shiite jurist and belletrist).

Noureddin Esheni Qudejani was also a classmate of Mir Seyyed Hassan Modarres Hashemi Esfahani (Isfahani scholar and sage) during studying Islamic courses of Qom Seminary. Noureddin Esheni Qudejani was a classmate of Ruhollah Khomeini (the founder of the Islamic Republic of Iran) in the lessons of Mohammad Ali Shahabadi (famous mystic and jurist) and in the Qom Seminary, Noureddin Esheni Qudejani has been a roommate of him for five years.

== Social careers ==
Although Noureddin Esheni Qudejani had a high scientific status, he was never unaware of his social duties and his relationship with the people. He did not limit himself to teaching, but also preached Islam and lectured in public and private assemblies, and even practiced law. In general, his social activities and occupations can be divided as follows:

1. Establishing Salah al jama'ah (prayer in congregation) in some mosques of Isfahan and answering people's religious questions and resolving their problems.
2. Establishing pulpit and sermons and speeches in various assemblies in Isfahan and some other cities and villages of Iran. His speeches were also broadcast on the National Iranian Radio.
3. Managing some weekly meetings and answering students' scientific questions.
4. Notary public in Golpayegan and Isfahan.
5. Head of Islamic Youth Organization.
6. Teaching in the seminary of Isfahan.
7. Compilation of books and composition of poems.

=== Sermon assembly ===
Due to his mastery of Islamic jurisprudence, wisdom, hadith, theology, tafsir, and poetic and mystical taste, he had attractive pulpits and lectures, and he was a glorious orator and an eloquent preacher. He studied and researched a lot before each of his lectures and presented the scientific and jurisprudential documents. Another feature of his speeches was his outspoken opposition to the tyranny and corruption of the imperial regime of Pahlavi dynasty (the last Iranian royal dynasty, ruling for almost 54 years between 1925 and 1979). In his speeches, he publicly fought against the lack of hijab and the moral corruption and the oppression and injustice of that time, for this reason, he was summoned several times by the Isfahan Police Department.

Noureddin Esheni Qudejani 's Rawda Khwani rituals and sermons were very popular in Isfahan and people showed great interest in his speeches, so that he, at the invitation of the people and various assemblies, in the last thirty years of his life, regularly gave pulpits and speeches. At that time, several meetings were held in Isfahan on social and religious issues. In the meantime, the sermon assemblies of scholars such as Seyyed Abdul Hussein Tayyeb, Sheikh Mohammad Baqir Zand Kermani, Noureddin Esheni Qudejani and Agha Seyyed Hassan Modarres were of special importance and were more famous than the other assemblies. Noureddin Esheni Qudejani, who was a figure with extensive knowledge, held his weekly meetings mostly in the field of philosophy of Ahkam.

=== Islamic Youth Organization ===
Noureddin Esheni Qudejani, who was known among the clergy and scholars for his enlightenment and who also studied and researched modern Western philosophy and thought, was for some time the head of the Islamic Youth Organization of Isfahan and spoke to intellectuals and modernists. A series of his articles in this regard also published in the Toofan newspaper (an analytical and critical newspaper of the Qajar period).

=== Teaching and students ===
Noureddin Esheni Qudejani taught in various schools of Isfahan Seminary such as: Sadr Madrasa, Chaharbagh, Masjed Nov Bazaar, and in his law office and even in his personal home. He taught books such as Faraed ol-Usul (a very important book on the principles of Shiite jurisprudence), Makasib (one of the important books of the highest levels of Shiite seminaries), Kefayah al-osul (important book of Principles of Islamic jurisprudence), Manzoomeh (a philosophical book considered by Shiite scholars), Four Journeys (an extended compendium of Islamic philosophy) and some other theological and mystical texts to students and scholars. For a long time he was one of the leading teachers of Sadr school and taught books such as Manzoomeh, Qawanin al-Usul (a complete course in the science of the principles of Shiite jurisprudence) and Faraed ol-Usul there. He also had a course on interpreting the Quran for the students of Sadr school, in which a group of scholars participated. It is narrated that about three hundred of students and scholars attended Noureddin Esheni Qudejani 's classes at the Masjed Nov Bazaar. In addition, he had private students who taught at home or at work. His students were both men and women, and at the request of some religious women in Isfahan, he went to their homes and taught them. Among his prominent students, can be mentioned: Seyyed Ahmad Faqih Emami, Hossein Mazaheri, Ahmad Qominejad, Sheikh Parsa and women such as: Zīnah al-Sādāt Humāyūnī and Effat al-Zaman Amin.

== Writings ==
Noureddin Esheni Qudejani did not give up writing, despite his social work and the abundance of lectures and advocacy. The largest volume of his writings is about the interpretation of the Quran because he considered the knowledge of the Quran as the highest sciences and devoted his great effort, both in expression and speech and in his teaching or writings, to the interpretation of the Quran. In general, his remaining works can be divided into five general topics: 1- Interpretation, 2- Theology and ethics, 3- Wisdom and mysticism, 4- Hadith, 5- Miscellaneous topics.

All his books are in Persian. Titles translated for ease of understanding.

=== Interpretations of Quran ===
1. Interpretation of the Al Imran Surah, verse of 190: «اِنَّ فی خَلْقِ السَّمواتِ وَ الْاَرْضِ وَاخْتِلافِ اللَّیْلِ وَالنَّهارِ لَایاتٍ لاِوُلِی الْاَلْبابِ»
2. Interpretation of the Ibrahim Surah, verse of 24: «اَلَمْ تَرَکَیْفَ ضَرَبَ اللّهُ مَثَلاً کَلِمَهً طَیِّبَهً کَشَجَرَهٍ طَیِّبَهٍ اَصْلُها ثابِثٌ وَ فَرْعُها فِی السَّمآءِ»
3. Interpretation of the Al-Qasas Surah, verse of 5: «وَ نُریدُ اَنْ نَمُنَّ عَلَی الَّذینَ اسْتُضْعِفُوا فِی الْاَرْضِ وَ نَجْعَلَهُمْ اَئِمَّهً وَ نَجْعَلَهُمُ الْوارِثینَ»
4. Interpretation of the Al-Mumtahanah Surah, verse of 1: «یا اَیُّهَا الَّذینَ امَنُوا لا تَتَّخِذوا عَدُوّی وَ عَدُوَّکُمْ اَوْلِیآءَ تُلْقُونَ اِلَیْهِمْ بِالْمَوَدَّهِ وَ قَدْ کَفَرُوا بِما جآءَکُمْ مِنَ الْحَقِّ یُخْرِجُونَ الرَّسُولَ وَ اریَّاکُمْ اَنْ تُؤْمِنُوا بِاللَّهِ رَبِّکُمْ اِنْ کُنْتُمْ خَرَجْتُمْ جِهاداً فی سَبیلی وَابْتِغآءَ مَرْضاتی تُسِرُّونَ اِلَیْهِمْ بِالْمَوَدَّهُ وَ اَنَا اَعْلَمُ بِمآ اَخْفَیْتُمْ وَ مآ اَعْلَنْتُمْ وَ مَنْ یَفْعَلْهُ مِنْکُمْ فَقَدْ ضَلَّ سَوآءَ السَّبیلِ»
5. Interpretation of the Fatir Surah, verse of 15: «یآ اَیُّهَا النَّاسُ اَنْتُمُ الْفُقَرآءُ اِلَی اللَّهِ وَاللَّهُ هُوَ الْغَنِیُّ الْحَمیدُ»
6. Interpretation of the Verse of Light
7. Interpretation of the some verses of Al-Waqi'a Surah
8. Interpretation of the Az-Zumar Surah, verse of 27: «وَلَقَدْ ضَرَبْنا لِلنَّاسِ فی هذَا الْقُرْانِ مِنْ کُلِّ مَثَلٍ لَعَلَّهُمْ یَتَذَکَّرُونَ»
9. The meaning of the Infaq in the verse of «مما رزقناهم ینفقون»
10. The priority of «بما انزل الیک» on «ما انزل من قبلک»
11. Piety in the Quran and avoiding immorality
12. Explain the meaning of "successors" and "caliphs" in the Quran
13. Restoration after death in the Quran
14. The proportion between a believer and a Muslim in the Quran
15. Interpretation of the Ya-Sin Surah, verse of 38: «وَ الشَّمْسُ تَجْری لِمُسْتَقَرٍّ لَها ذلِکَ تَقْدیرُ الْعَزیزِ الْعَلیمِ»
16. Certain lands in the Quran
17. Intercession in the Quran
18. The meaning of «خیره» in the verse of «وَ ما کانَ لَهُمُ الْخِیَرَهُ»
19. The purpose of «نور» in the verse of «فَامِنُوا بِاللَّهِ وَ رَسُولِه وزالُّورِ الَّذی اَنْزَلْنا وَاللَّهُ بِما تَعْمَلُونَ خَبیرٌ»
20. Interpretation of the Al-Ala Surah, verse of 18: «اِنَّ هذا لَفِی الصُّحُفِ الْاوُلی»
21. Ahkam of Quran

=== Theology and ethics ===
1. The treatise of Fowz Fayzi: In the expression of predestination and delegation and matter between matters
2. Principles of religion in fluent language: Along with allegory and inference
3. Today and tomorrow: In the difference of the school of the prophets
4. A treatise containing various jurisprudential, theological, moral and legal topics: It has thirty chapters
5. Rejection of the doubts about Mahdism
6. Ethical advice to children and relatives
7. Lama'ate Hosseini

=== Wisdom and mysticism ===
1. Human knowledge and human ego and spirit
2. The world of knowledge and brio and life: It was written in July 28, 1961
3. In the instance world
4. In the spirit world
5. Descriptions on the book Four Journeys by Mulla Sadra
6. Descriptions on the book "Sharhe Manzoomeh" by Hadi Sabzavari
7. Descriptions on the book "Sharhe Asma al-Hosna" by Hadi Sabzavari

=== Hadith ===
1. Explanation of the hadith: «حاسِبوا قبل ان یُحاسبوا»
2. Explanation of the hadith: «الصوم لی و انا اجزی علیه»
3. Explanation of the hadith: «ان تصوموا خیرٌ لکم»
4. Explanation of the hadith: «الدنیا مزرعه الآخره»

=== Miscellaneous ===
1. Tips and memories: Includes important historical and social points and the author's poems
2. Nowruz or New Day: Telling the historical story of Nowruz and its importance and some of its customs and conditions
3. Author's correspondence with Imam Khomeini
4. Author's personal notes
5. Collection of poems

== Spouse and children ==
Noureddin Esheni Qudejani from his wife Khanum Agha Kathiri had two sons named Asif and As'ad and four daughters.

== Death ==
Noureddin Esheni Qudejani finally died of a heart attack on October 14, 1978 (Dhu al-Qadah 12, 1398 AH), and was buried in "Kalbasi Tekyeh" (Tomb of Mirza Abolma'ali Kalbasi) in Takht-e Foulad cemetery of Isfahan next to the grave of his father.

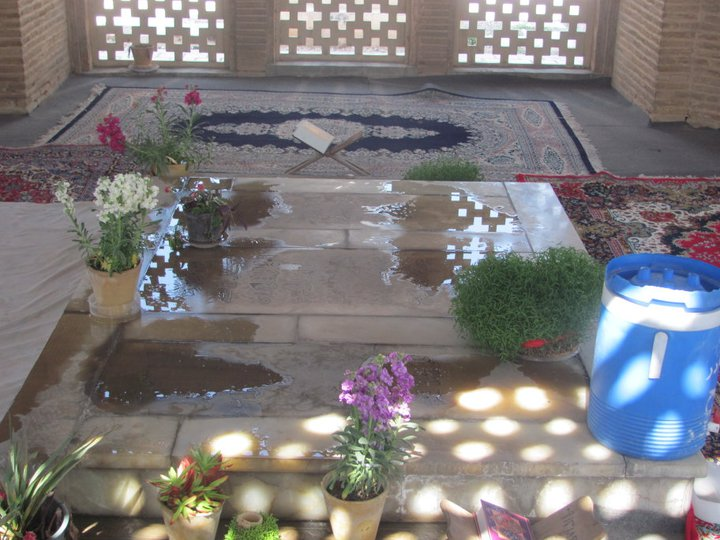
Tombstones of Noureddin Esheni Qudejani and his father Mohammad Hossein Esheni Qudejani

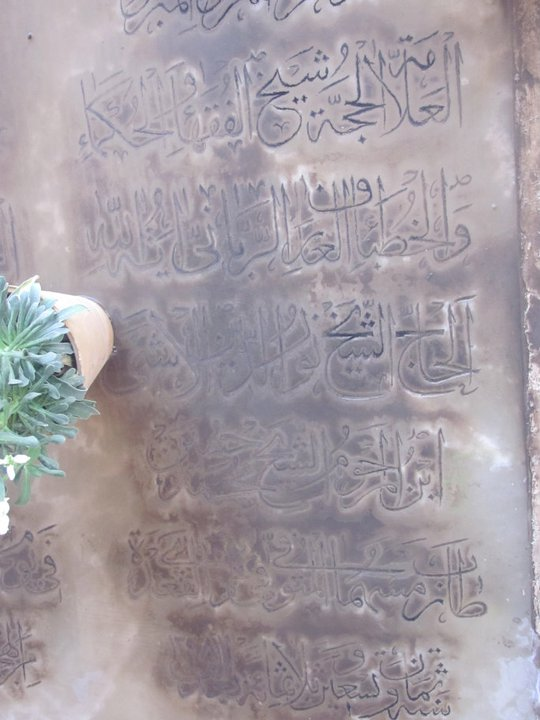
Engraving of the tombstone of Noureddin Esheni Qudejani

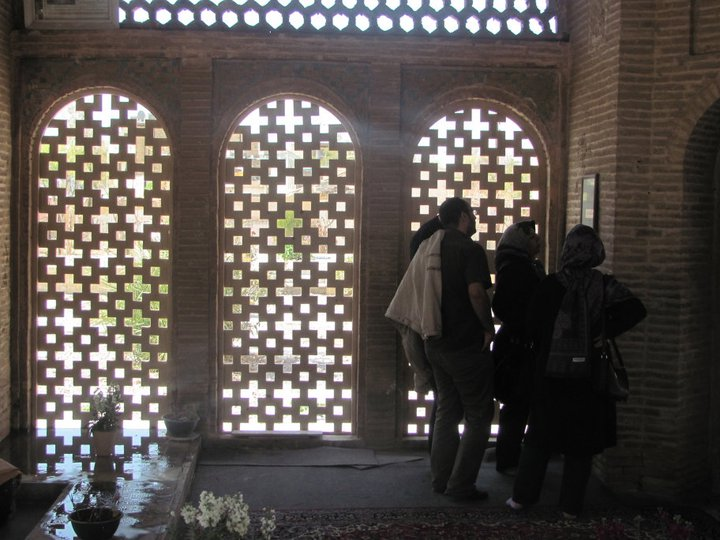
Inside view of the tomb of Noureddin Esheni Qudejani

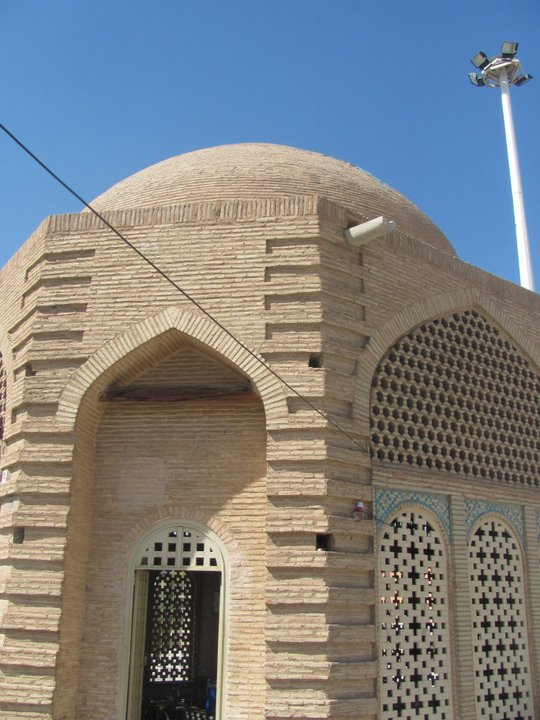
Outside view of the tomb of Noureddin Esheni Qudejani in the Kalbasi Tekyeh

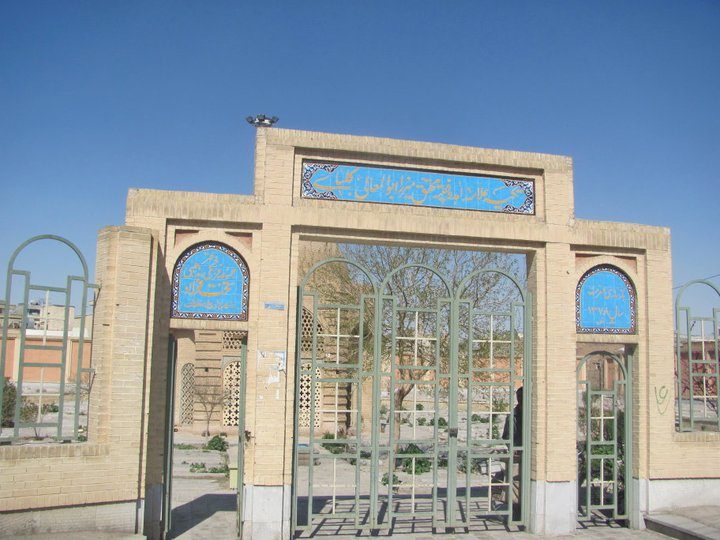
The entrance of the Kalbasi Tekyeh

== See also ==
Lecture by Noureddin Esheni Qudejani
Part of his sermon on friendship and affection

- Mohammad Hossein Esheni Qudejani
- Hibatuddin Shahrestani
- Mirza Jawad Maleki Tabrizi
- Abdul Karim Kho'ini Zanjani
- Agha Zia ol Din Araghi
- Mohammad Jawad al-Balaghi
- Ali Asghar Mazandarani
