= Abdul Karim Kho'ini Zanjani =

Iranian Ayatollah (1874–1938)

Abdul Karim Kho'ini Zanjani (Persian: عبدالکریم خوئینی زنجانی; 1874 – 1938) was an Iranian scholar and cleric.

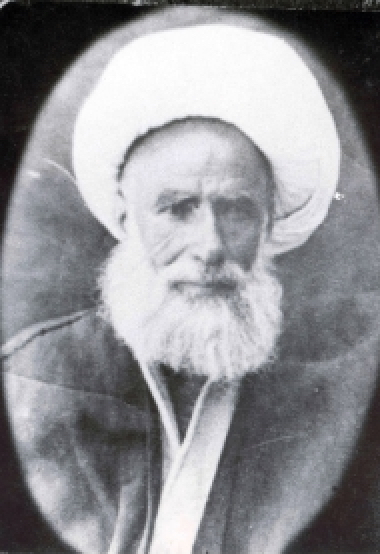
Photograph of Haj Sheikh Abdul Karim Kho'ini Zanjani.

== Personal life ==
In 1874, Karim was born in Khoein. His father was Mlaabrahym bin Ishaq ibn Imran Sheikh Ansari and his mother was the daughter of Sheikh Abdul Karim Oil Qazvin. She had a higher education. Karim's mother had a keen interest in spirituality. He married in Najaf and then returned to Qazvin, where he died in 1938 after going to Khoein. He was buried in the new cemetery.

== Education ==
Karim received his early education at Immaculate Seminary Qazvin. He moved to Najaf for his higher education.

His professors in Najaf were:

- Mohammed Kazem Yazdi
- Fethullah Qa'ravi Isfahani
- Muhammad Kazim Khurasani
- Seyyed Mohammad Hojjat Kooh Kamari
- Mirza Mohammad Taqi Shirazi

== Return to Zanjan ==
Karim returned to Zanjan in 1908 to promote religion, the affairs of the Muslim people, and to train seminary students. Mirza Baqir Zanjani taught alongside prominent teachers such as Sayed Ahmad Zanjani, a leading scholar in Qom during the Boroujerdi time.

== See also ==
- Mirza Jawad Agha Maleki Tabrizi
- Hibatuddin Shahrestani
- Mohammad Hossein Esheni Qudejani
- Noureddin Esheni Qudejani
