= Mohammad Hossein Esheni Qudejani =

Iranian Shiite scholar of the 19th century

- محمد حسین اشنی قودجانی
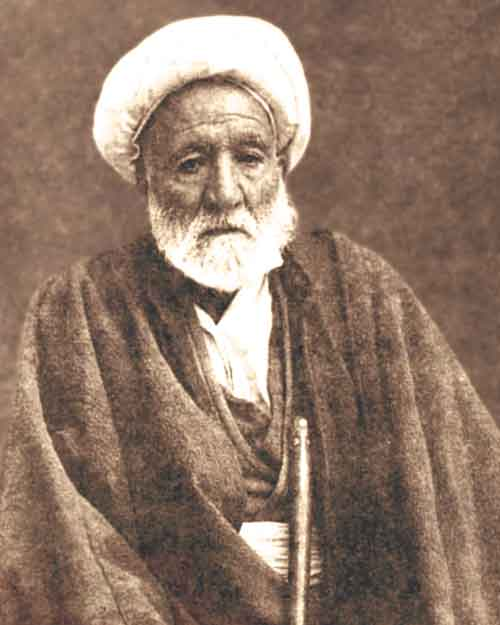
- Born: 1868 (1285 AH); Qudejan, Khansar, Iran
- Died: May 5, 1956 (aged 87–88) (Ramadan 24, 1375 AH); Isfahan, Iran
- Burial place: Kalbasi Tekyeh in Takht-e Foulad cemetery
- Education: Islamic seminary
- Occupations: Islamic scholar, Faqih
- Children: Noureddin Esheni Qudejani

Mohammad Hossein Esheni or Mohammad Hossein Esheni Qudejani (1868 – May 5, 1956) was an Iranian Shia cleric and experienced Faqih.

== ‌Birth ==
Mohammad Hossein Esheni Qudejani was born around 1868 (1285 AH) in Qudejan village of Cheshmeh Sar Rural District in the Central District of Khansar County, Isfahan Province, Iran. He grew up in a sagacious and religious family and spent his childhood and adolescence under the tutelage of a sage pious father and a religious mother. His father Haaj Mulla Mohammad and his grandfather Haaj Mulla Ali were both Islamic scholars and ascetics of their time. Mohammad Hossein Esheni Qudejani lived in the village of Eshen for many years to propagate the rules and religion of Islam, and for this reason, he became known as "Esheni".

== Educations ==
Mohammad Hossein Esheni Qudejani, who had heard the fame of the Isfahan seminary and its ancient background many times, went to Isfahan and benefited greatly from the presence of famous men and scientists of this city. Among his professors in Isfahan are Mirza Abolma'ali Kalbasi, Mir Seyyed Mohammad Taghi Modarres, Mohammad Taghi Agha Najafi and Seyyed Mohammad Bagher Dorchehie. Mohammad Hossein Esheni Qudejani, who was a close friend and like-minded of Hossein Borujerdi and Rahim Arbab, also used the presence of Akhund Mullah Mohammad Kashani and possibly the presence of Jahangir Khan Ghashghaei.

Mohammad Hossein Esheni Qudejani, after using the presence of the famous jurists and sages of Isfahan, went to Iraq and became acquainted with the opinions and views of the Islamic jurists and scholars of that land. At that time, there were famous scholars and teachers in Najaf such as Muhammad Kadhim Khorasani, Mohammed Kazem Yazdi, Fethullah Qa'ravi Isfahani and the like, and Mohammad Hossein Esheni Qudejani probably studied under them, especially Muhammad Kadhim Khorasani and Mohammed Kazem Yazdi.

== Friends and contemporaries ==
Among his contemporaries, friends and close associates, it can be mentioned Hossein Ali Tababataei Borujerdi and Haj Agha Rahim Arbab. They got acquainted with each other in the courses of professors such as Mirza Abolma'ali Kalbasi, Seyyed Mohammad Bagher Dorchehie, Mir Seyyed Mohammad Taghi Modarres, and other professors of Isfahan at that time. They are in touch with each other for the rest of their lives.

== Return to Iran ==
After returning from Najaf, at the request of his close friend and companionship Hossein Ali Tababataei Borujerdi, Mohammad Hossein Esheni Qudejani went to the village of Eshen in the northwest of Najafabad County to preach and promote the rules of Islam. He has been living in Eshen village for many years and that is why he is also known as "Esheni". During this period Mohammad Hossein Esheni Qudejani 's son Nur al-Din was born, and he later became known as "Esheni" too.

Mohammad Hossein Esheni Qudejani also went to Golpayegan for some time during the reign of Reza Shah and settled in his hometown of Qudejan and received the privilege of a notary public there.

== Teaching and disciples ==
The late Mohammad Hossein Esheni Qudejani, after living in the village of Eshen for many years, finally after 1946 (1365 AH) in the last ten years of his life, at the insistence of some scholars as well as some benefactors of Isfahan, such as the late Rahimzadeh, he returned to Isfahan and taught at the Darb-e-Kushk seminary. Mohammad Hossein Esheni Qudejani teaching the highest level Islamic seminary courses there and some scholars benefited from his presence. Among the elders who attended his class were Mir Seyyed Hassan Modarres Hashemi Esfahani (the great contemporary scholar of Isfahan) and his own son Nur al-Din Esheni (famous Faqih, jurist, preacher and orator). The late Mir Seyyed Hassan Modarres Hashemi Esfahani said that Mohammad Hossein Esheni Qudejani 's lesson was deep and research-oriented and the best scholars of the time participated in that lesson.

Mohammad Hossein Esheni Qudejani, among his disciples, paid special attention to Mir Seyyed Hassan Modarres Hashemi Esfahani and always praised him and his talent and strength of memory.

Mohammad Hossein Esheni Qudejani had a great skill in Islamic jurisprudence and its principles and some scholars considered him to be the most learned jurist of Isfahan and a first-rate mujtahid of the city. The late Agha Sadr Kuhpaei (Islamic sage and philosopher) acknowledged Mohammad Hossein Esheni Qudejani 's jurisprudence. The late Seyyed Mosleh al-Din Mahdavi (famous researcher and historian) praised Mohammad Hossein Esheni Qudejani as: "the learned jurist, the perfect scholar and the perfect mujtahid who had the mastery of religion and science".

== Children ==
Mohammad Hossein Esheni Qudejani left a total of five children with his two wives. From the first wife, two sons and a daughter: Mr. Nur al-Din, Mr. Jalal and Ms. Fatemeh, and from the second wife, a son and a daughter: Mr. Mahdi and Ms. Taaj. The late Nur al-Din Esheni was the eldest son of Mohammad Hossein Esheni Qudejani and his successor in science and practice, and the inheritor of his asceticism and piety.

== Death ==
Mohammad Hossein Esheni died on May 5, 1956 (Ramadan 24, 1375 AH) and was buried next day in "Kalbasi Tekyeh" (Tomb of his master Mirza Abolma'ali Kalbasi) in Takht-e Foulad cemetery in Isfahan, Iran.

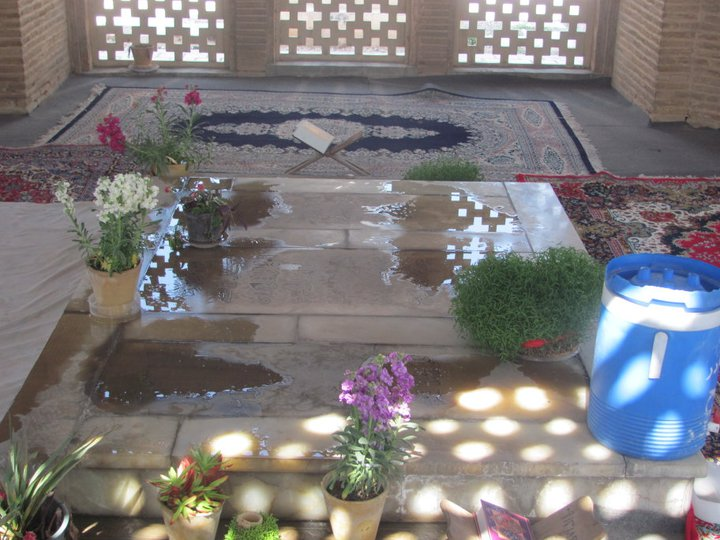
Tombstones of Mohammad Hossein Esheni Qudejani and his son Nur al-Din Esheni

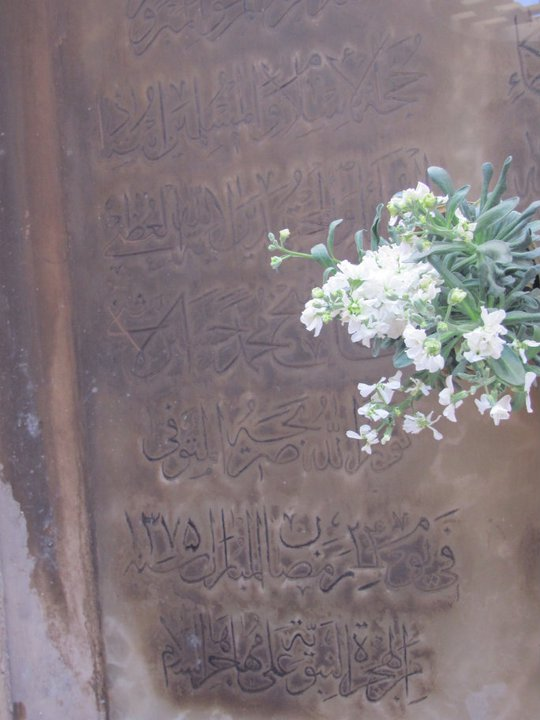
Engraving of the tombstone of Mohammad Hossein Esheni Qudejani

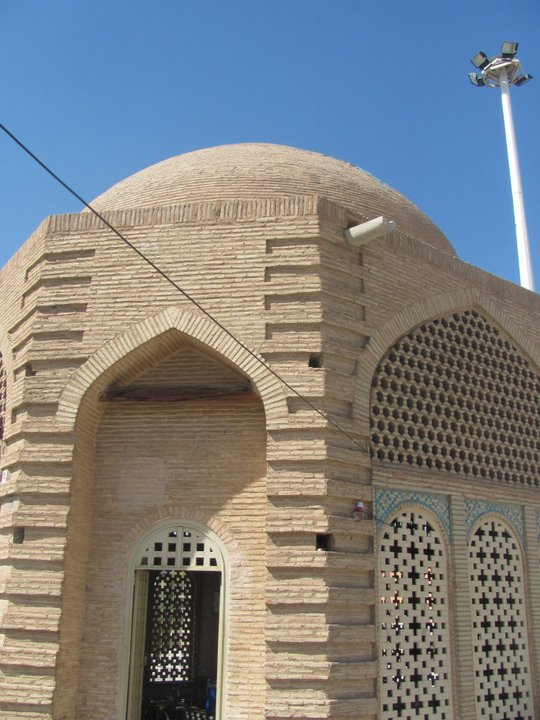
Tomb of Mohammad Hossein Esheni Qudejani in the Kalbasi Tekyeh

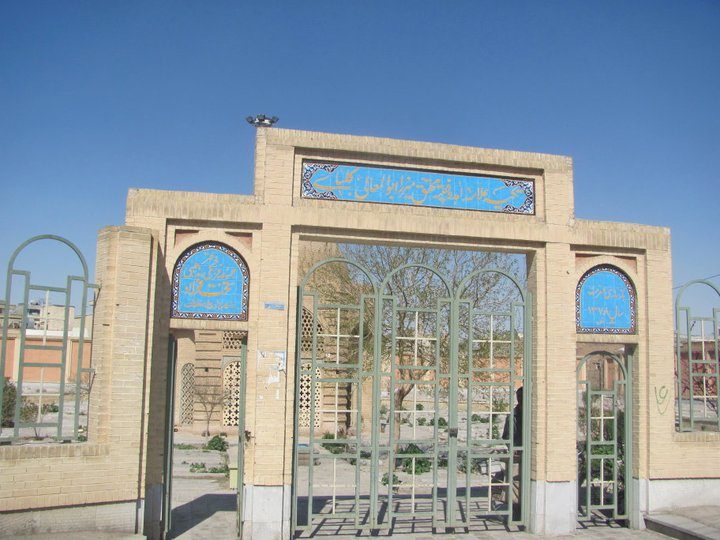
The entrance of the Kalbasi Tekyeh

== See also ==
Lecture by Mohammad Hossein Esheni Qudejani
Part of his sermon on Principles of Islamic jurisprudence

- Hibatuddin Shahrestani
- Mirza Jawad Maleki Tabrizi
- Abdul Karim Kho'ini Zanjani
- Agha Zia ol Din Araghi
- Mohammad Jawad al-Balaghi
- Ali Asghar Mazandarani
