= Ali Asghar Mazandarani =

Islam scholar

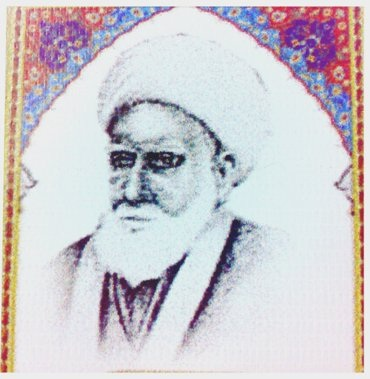
- Title: Ayatollah

Personal life
- Born: 1826
- Died: 1911 (aged 84–85)
- Era: Modern era
- Main interest: Fiqh
- Occupation: Muslim scholar

Religious life
- Religion: Islam
- Jurisprudence: Usuli Twelver Shia
- Creed: Jafari jurisprudence

Grand Ayatollah Ali Asghar Mazandarani (Persian: علی‌اصغر مازندرانی; 1826–1911) was an Iranian cleric originally from Amirkola. He was a spiritual guide for many Shia Muslims.

== Life ==
Mazandarani was educated in formal Islamic studies at Mirza Habibolah Rashti, Mola Esmaeil Borojerdi, Mohammad Ashrafi, Mohammad-Kazem Khorasani, and the Mirza Hosein khalili Tehrani seminary in Najaf. After completing his studies, he returned to Amirkola and Babol in Mazandaran and was responsible for religious affairs there.

== Death ==
Mazandarani died in 1911. After his death, the Babol Amirkola city markets were closed, and people wore black in mourning. Mazandarani was buried in the Garden of Rizwan. His tomb was destroyed in Reza Khan age, but later repaired by Mazandarani's grandson, Haj Ali Asghar Khalili Amiri.

== See also ==
- Mirza Jawad Maleki Tabrizi
- Hibatuddin Shahrestani
- Mohammad Hossein Esheni Qudejani
- Noureddin Qudejani Esheni
