= Mohammad Jawad al-Balaghi =

Iraqi Shia religious authority and poet (1865–1933)

Ayatollah Sheikh Muhammad-Jawad al-Balaghi
- الشيخ محمد جواد البلاغي النجفي

Personal life
- Born: 1865 Najaf, Baghdad Vilayet, Ottoman Empire
- Died: December 10, 1933 (aged 67–68) Najaf, Kingdom of Iraq
- Resting place: Imam Ali Shrine
- Parent: Sheikh Hassan al-Balaghi (father)

Religious life
- Religion: Islam
- Jurisprudence: Twelver Shia Islam

Ayatollah Sheikh Muhammad-Jawad al-Balaghi al-Najafi (Arabic: محمد جواد البلاغي النجفي; 1865 – December 10, 1933) was an Iraqi Shia religious authority, author, poet, and polemicist.

It is reported that besides his native Arabic language, al-Balaghi was also well-versed in English, Hebrew and Persian.

He was a prominent student of Mirza Muhammad-Taqi al-Shirazi, supporting him throughout the Iraqi revolt of 1920; and Muhammad-Kadhim al-Khurasani.

== Family ==
al-Balaghi was from the prominent religious al-Balaghi family. Their origins go back to the Rubeya clan of the tribal Arab Adnanite confederation. al-Balaghi's great ancestor, Sheikh Muhammad al-Balaghi immigrated to Karbala in 1457 to seek a religious education. The patriarch of the intellectual family was Sheikh Muhammad-Ali al-Balaghi who died in Karbala in 1592, who was a grand religious authority, and one of the disseminators of Usul al-Kafi. Later, Sheikh Muhammad-Ali's grandson, Sheikh Hassan al-Balaghi travelled to Najaf, and settled in 1693. al-Balaghi's lineage is as follows:

Muḥammad-Jawād bin Ḥassan bin Ṭalib bin ʿAbbās bin Ibrahīm bin Ḥusayn bin ʿAbbās II bin Ḥassan bin ʿAbbās I bin Muḥammad-ʿAli bin Ḥassan bin Muḥammad bin Balāgh bin Walī-Allāh bin Darwīsh [leading to] Asad bin Rabīʿa bin Nizar bin Maʿad bin ʿAdnan.

== Early life and education ==
al-Balaghi was born to Sheikh Hassan al-Balaghi (d. 1882) in November 1865. He grew up in Najaf, and moved to Kadhimiya in 1888 to pursue a religious education.

=== Education ===
Upon completing his muqadamat (introductory studies), he returned to Najaf in 1894. Whilst in Najaf he studied under scholars like Sheikh Muhammad-Kadhim al-Khurasani, Sheikh Muhammad-Taha Najaf, Sayyid Muhammad al-Hindi, and Muhammad-Hassan al-Mamaqani. He then travelled to Samarra in 1908, to study under Mirza Muhammad-Taqi al-Shirazi. He remained in Samarra for ten years studying in its seminary.

During the siege of Kut, Mirza Taqi travelled to Kadhimiya, who feared that Samarra could end up like Kut, and that way many from the religious sphere would die. al-Balaghi followed Mirza Taqi, and remained in Kadhimiya for two years. He then returned to Najaf in 1920 after his mentor was poisoned.

=== Students ===
Some of al-Balaghi's most notable students included:

- Sayyid Muhammad-Hadi al-Milani
- Sayyid Abu al-Qasim al-Khoei
- Sheikh Muhammad-Amin Zayn al-Din
- Sheikh Muhammad-Ridha Tabsi

== Works ==
al-Balaghi enjoyed a library of publications, and wrote about many things include jurisprudence, principles of jurisprudence, Quranic exegesis, inter-faith matters. Some of his books included:

- al-Huda Ala Din al-Mustafa (Guidance on the religion of al-Mustafa). 2 volumes. A response to the Christian Ethiopian hermit Abd al-Thaluth al-Habashi.
- al-Rihla al-Madrasiyah (The School Journey). 3 volumes. A critique of other faiths.
- Anwar al-Huda (The Light of Guidance). A deconstruction of atheism.
- Nasa'ih al-Huda (Advice of Guidance). A deconstruction of Bábism.
- Risalat al-Tawhid wal-Tathleeth (Letter of Oneness and Threeness)
- A'jeeb al-Akatheeb (Wonders of Lies)
- Ajiwabat al-Masa'il al-Baghdadiya (Answers to Baghdadi Questions). A book of principles of jurisprudence.
- al-Balagh al-Mubeen (The True Eloquence). A book of mysticism.
- Alaa' al Rahman Fi Tafsir al-Quran (The Mercifuls Wonders in the Exegesis of the Quran). A book of Quranic exegesis.

== Personal life ==
al-Balaghi married the daughter of Sayyid Musa al-Jazayeri al-Kadhimi in 1889, whilst he was in Kadhimiya. He only had daughters, and no sons.

== Death ==
He died in the early hours of Friday December 3, 1933. He is buried in the third southern room of the west wing of the courtyard of the Imam Ali Shrine.

== See also ==
- Mirza Jawad Maleki Tabrizi
- Hibatuddin Shahrestani
- Mohammad Hossein Esheni Qudejani
- Noureddin Qudejani Esheni
