= Seyyed Mohammad Hojjat Kooh Kamari =

Iranian Muslim cleric

- سید محمد حجت کوه‌کمری
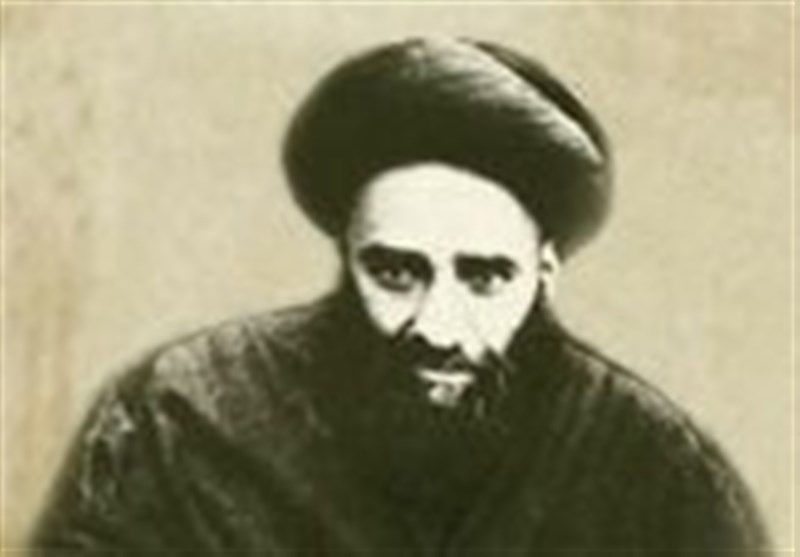

Personal life
- Born: 17 March 1893 Tabriz, Iran
- Died: 19 January 1953 (aged 59) Qom, Iran
- Resting place: Hojjatieh School; 34.6416812°N 50.874674°E
- Home town: Tabriz, Iran
- Children: Seyyed Mohsen, Seyyed Hassan
- Parent: Seyyed Ali Kooh Kamari Tabrizi (father)
- Education: Fiqh, Principles of Islamic jurisprudence, Hadith studies, Biographical evaluation

Religious life
- Religion: Islam
- Denomination: Shia
- Institute: Qom Seminary
- Lineage: Sayyid, Ali ibn Husayn Zayn al-Abidin, Musa al-Kadhim
- Sect: Twelver
- Profession: Faqīh, Marja'

Muslim leader
- Teacher: Mohammed Kazem Yazdi; Agha Zia ol Din Araghi; Fethullah Qa'ravi Isfahani
- Students: Mirza Hashem Amoli; Mohammad Ali Qazi Tabatabaei; Mousa Shubairi Zanjani; Morteza Haeri Yazdi; Ali Safi Golpaygani; Lotfollah Safi Golpaygani; Ja'far Sobhani; Karamatollah Malek-Hosseini

Seyyed Mohammad Hojjat Kooh Kamari (Persian: سید محمد حجت کوه‌کمری; 1893–1953) was a contemporary Iranian Muslim Faqīh and a Twelver Marja' who was in charge of the administration of the Qom Seminary for ten years. He was born on 17 March 1893 and died on 19 January 1953. He was a prominent student of Abdul-Karim Haeri Yazdi and after him held the position of Shia authority.

== Birth and lineage ==
Seyyed Mohammad Hojjat Kooh Kamari was born on 17 March 1893 in Tabriz, Iran. His family was a religious family and his father, Seyyed Ali Kooh Kamari Tabrizi, was one of the mujtahids of Tabriz. His lineage is from Sayyids of Kooh Kamar in Zonuzaq Rural District, Marand County, East Azerbaijan Province, Iran and goes back to Ali ibn Husayn Zayn al-Abidin.

== Scientific life ==
Seyyed Mohammad Hojjat Kooh Kamari studied literature, mathematics, ancient medicine and some new sciences in Tabriz, Iran. He learned most of the basic courses of Islamic jurisprudence and principles from his father there and also taught for some time. In 1912, he went to Najaf, Iraq to continue his education after taking basic seminary courses from his father.

In Najaf, he learned Islamic jurisprudence, Principles of Islamic jurisprudence, Hadith studies and Biographical evaluation from the masters of Najaf seminary, including Mohammed Kazem Yazdi, Fethullah Qa'ravi Isfahani and Agha Zia ol Din Araghi. He also studied astronomy there. Hojjat fell ill during his studies in Najaf and returned to Tabriz on the advice of his father, but after a while he went to Najaf again and in addition to continuing his education, he also taught.

In 1930, he returned to Iran and settled in Qom and began teaching in the Qom Seminary. His eloquence and mastery in teaching and his surroundings on the opinions and sources of Islamic jurisprudence attracted many students to his study circle. In 1945, he started the foundation of Hojjatieh school in Qom.

== Shia authority ==
After the deaths of Abu l-Hasan al-Isfahani in 1947 and Seyyed Hossein Tabatabaei Qomi in 1948, he became a Shia authority; And millions followed him in religious rulings.

He had authority of Hadith studies from some of his masters, including his father, Agha Zia ol Din Araghi, Shariat Isfahani, Seyyed Abutorab Khansari, Abdullah Mamaqani, Seyyed Hassan Sadr, Mohammad Baqer Birjandi, Abdul-Karim Haeri Yazdi and Mohammad Hossein Kashif al-Ghatta. He also received a certificate of Ijtihad from Muhammad Hossein Naini, Agha Zia ol Din Araghi and some of his other teachers.

== His books ==
Seyyed Mohammad Hojjat Kooh Kamari has many writings in Hadith studies, Fiqh, Principles of Islamic jurisprudence and Biographical evaluation.

=== Hadith studies ===
His most important hadith works are:

- Lavame ol-Anvar al-Qaraviah fi Morsalat el-Asar el-Nabavieh (Arabic: لَوامِعُ الاَنوار الغَرَویة فی مُرْسَلاتِ الآثارِ النَّبَویة)
- Mostadrak ol-Mostadrak fi Estedrake ma Fata An Sahebe el-Mostadrak (Arabic: مُسْتَدْرَکُ المُسْتَدرَک فی اِستِدراکِ ما فاتَ عن صاحبِ المُسْتَدرَک)
- Jame ol-Ahadith va al-Osool (Arabic: جامعُ الاحادیث و الاصول)

=== Fiqh ===
His important jurisprudential works are:

- Ketab al-Beie (Arabic: کتاب‌البیع)
- Ketab ol-Salat (Arabic: کتاب‌الصلوة)
- Ketab al-Vaqf (Arabic: کتاب‌الوقف)
- Tanqih ol-Mataleb ol-Mobhamah fi Amal el-Sovar el-Mojassamah (Arabic: تَنْقیحُ المطالبُ المُبْهَمَة فی عَمَلِ الصُّوَرِ المُجسّمة)
- Manaseke Haj (Persian: مناسک حج)
- Kholasat ol-Ahkam (Arabic: خلاصةالاحکام)
- Montakhab ol-Ahkam (Arabic: منتخب‌الاحکام)
- Tarjomeye Farsi Bedayat ol-Hedayah (Persian translation of Arabic: بِدایةُ الهدایة)

He also published notes on some Fatwa books, including:

- Vasilat ol-Nejah (Arabic: وسیلة النجاة) by Abu l-Hasan al-Isfahani
- Al-Urwah al-Wuthqa (Arabic: عروةالوثقی) by Mohammed Kazem Yazdi

=== Principles of Islamic jurisprudence ===
He has written the following books on the principles of Islamic jurisprudence:

- Resalat al-Estes'hab (Arabic: رسالة الاستصحاب)
- Notes on Kefayah al-osul (Arabic: کفایة الاصول) by Muhammad Kadhim Khorasani

=== Biographical evaluation ===
The Biographical evaluation book of him is:

- Notes on Tanqih ol-Maqal (Arabic: تَنْقیحُ المَقال) by Abdullah Mamaqani

According to Shahab ud-Din Mar'ashi Najafi, some of Seyyed Mohammad Hojjat Kooh Kamari's writings, were in his library in his own handwriting and have not been published.

== His students ==
Due to his years of education in the Hawza Najaf and the Qom Seminary, he was able to raise many outstanding students. Some of them are:

- Seyyed Mohammad Taqi Ghazanfari
- Seyyed Mohammad Mohaqeq Damad
- Mirza Hashem Amoli
- Mohammad Ali Qazi Tabatabaei
- Mousa Shubairi Zanjani
- Morteza Haeri Yazdi
- Ali Safi Golpaygani
- Lotfollah Safi Golpaygani
- Mirza Ali Qoravi Alyari
- Ja'far Sobhani
- Hossein Wahid Khorasani
- Abdul Karim Haghshenas
- Muhammad Husayn Tabatabai
- Mehdi Haeri Yazdi
- Ali Meshkini
- Moslem Malakouti
- Ali al-Sistani
- Mohammad Sadoughi
- Karamatollah Malek-Hosseini

== Death ==
Seyyed Mohammad Hojjat Kooh Kamari, after a period of serious illness, died on 19 January 1953 at the age of 62 in Qom and was buried in a room next to the mosque of the Hojjatieh School.

== Commemoration ==
The commemoration of Seyyed Mohammad Hojjat Kooh Kamari was held in February 2018 by the Qom Seminary.

== See also ==
- Seyyed Hassan Eslami Ardakani
- Ali Movahedi-Kermani
- Najm al-Din Tabasi
- Mohammad Bagher Estahbanati
- Zakaria ibn Idris Ash'ari Qomi
- Ahmad ibn Ishaq Ash'ari Qomi
- Zakaria ibn Adam Ash'ari Qomi
- Mohammad ibn Umar Kashshi
- Mirza-ye Qomi
- Agha Hossein Khansari
- Mirza Jawad Agha Maleki Tabrizi
