= Abdul Karim Haghshenas =

- عبدالکریم حق‌شناس
- Ayatollah Haghshenas
- Title: Ayatollah

Personal life
- Born: 1919 Tehran
- Died: 24 July 2007 (aged 87–88) Tehran
- Resting place: Shah Abdol-Azim Shrine
- Education: Qom Hawza

Religious life
- Religion: Shia Islam
- Jurisprudence: Twelver Shia

Senior posting
- Teacher: Mirza Mahdi Ashtiani, Seyyed Hossein Borujerdi, Ruhollah Khomeini, Abu al-Qasim al-Khoei, Muhammad Hujjat Kuh-Kamari

Abdul Karim Haghshenas (Persian: عبدالکریم حق‌شناس) (born 1919, Tehran – died on 24 July 2007, Tehran) was a contemporary Muslim jurist and mystic moralist.

In Tehran, he taught courses in ethics and religious affairs. Ayatollah Haghshenas died at the age of 88 on 24 July 2007, and he was buried in the Shah-Abdol-Azim shrine complex.

== See also ==
- List of ayatollahs
