= Fethullah Qa'ravi Isfahani =

Iranian religious servant (1850–1920)

- فتح‌الله غروی اصفهانی
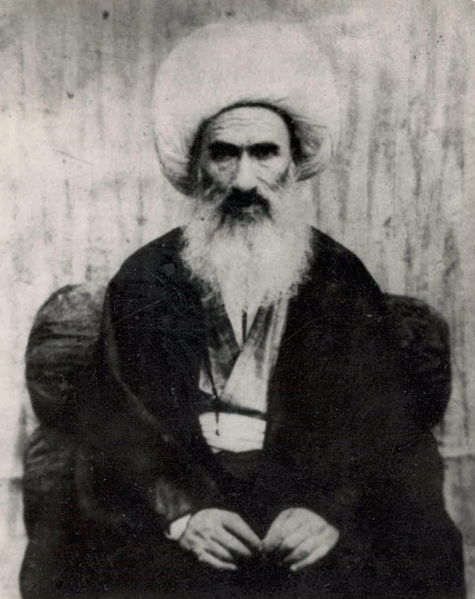

Personal life
- Born: 1850 Isfahan, Qajar Iran
- Died: 19 December 1920 (aged 69–70) Najaf, Mandatory Iraq

Religious life
- Religion: Islam
- Denomination: Shia

Fethullah Qa'ravi Isfahani (Persian: فتح‌الله غروی اصفهانی; 1850 – 19 December 1920) was a Persian cleric and revolutionary leader.

== Early life ==
He was the child of Mohammad Javad Namazi, the Marja of Isfahan.

He studied at the Isfahan Seminary, the same Mashhad seminary that taught Mirza Hassan Nasrallah Madras, Ibrahim Boroujerdi, and Seyed Morteza Haeri. He returned to Isfahan in 1878.

== Career ==
After the death of Muhammad Taqi Shirazi, he led an uprising against British influence in Iran.

=== Teaching ===
In 1896, he went to Mecca on the Hajj where he had discussions with Sunni scholars. His most important lessons were on:

- Higher education jurisprudence
- Commentary and Quranic sciences
- Philosophy and theology

== Professors ==
* Mirza Mohammad Hashim khansari

- Mullah Haider Ali Isfahani
- Nasrallah Madras
- Sheikh Mohammed Sadiq Tonekaboni
- Mullah Ahmad Sabzevari
- Sheikh Abdol javad Khorasani
- Mohammad Taqi heravi
- Mohammad Rahimi Boroujerdi
- Mirza Habibollah rashti

== Students ==
- Sayed Hadi Hosseini Shirazi
- Sayed Mohammad Taghi khansari
- Mirza Abu'l-Qasem Zanjani
- Agha Zia Addin Araghi
- Seyyed Hossein Borujerdi
- Abdul-Karim Ha'eri Yazdi
- Muhammad Hujjat Kuh-Kamari
- Shahab al-Din Mar'ashi Najafi
- Muhsin al-Hakim
- Muhammad-Amin al-Imami al-Khu'i

== Death ==
Fethullah Qa'ravi Isfahani died in 1920 due to coronary artery disease. In the courtyard of the Imam Ali Mosque in Razavi, he was buried in one of the eastern stands.
