= Mirza Jawad Agha Maleki Tabrizi =

Iranian Islamic scholar (1857–1925)

- میرزا جواد آقا ملکی تبریزی
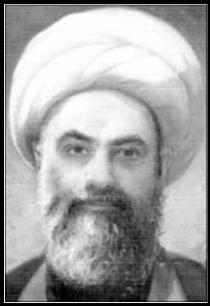
- Born: 1857 (1274 AH); Tabriz, Qajar Iran
- Died: 3 July 1925 (11 Dhu al-Hijjah 1343 AH); Qom, Qajar Iran
- Burial place: Sheikhan cemetery 34°38′33.5″N 50°52′53.7″E
- Education: Islamic Seminary
- Occupations: Fiqh; Principles; Morality; Wisdom; Islamic mysticism
- Known for: Asrar al-Salat; Al-Moraqibat
- Father: Mirza Shafie

Mirza Jawad Agha Maleki Tabrizi or Mirza Jawad Maleki Tabrizi (1857 Tabriz – 3 July 1925 Qom) was a scholar of Islamic jurisprudence, principles, ethics, wisdom and Islamic mysticism.

== Birth and lineage ==
Mirza Jawad Agha Maleki Tabrizi was born in 1857 (1274 AH) in Tabriz, Iran, although the exact date of his birth is unknown. He was from a family of nobles and aristocrats, and his father was from the family of "Malek ol-Tojjar" and was a wealthy merchant. The reason for naming him "Maleki" is the family relationship with the "Malek ol-Tojjar" family of the Tabriz merchants.

== Education and career ==
Mirza Jawad Maleki Tabrizi learned the sciences of morphology, syntax, rhetoric and expression, and the basic level of the Islamic seminary courses in Tabriz. Then he went to Najaf and studied there under the great scholars and masters of that time such as:

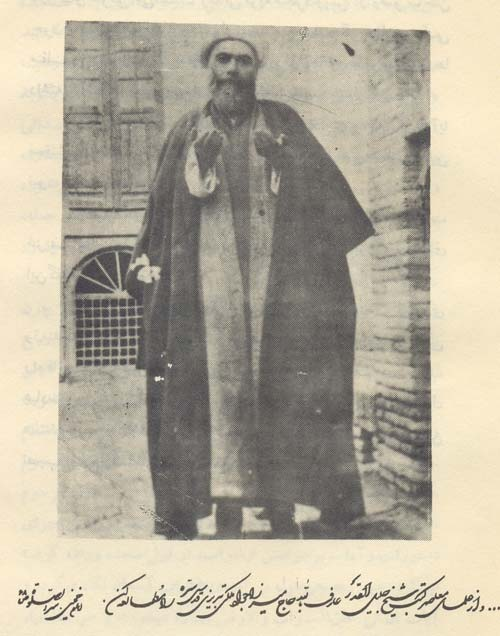
Mirza Jawad Maleki Tabrizi in Qunut or Prayer.

- Mirza Husain Noori Tabarsi
- Reza Hamadani Najafi
- Muhammad Kadhim Khorasani
- Husayn Quli Hamadani: Mirza Jawad Maleki Tabrizi had a special devotion to him and was his companion for 14 years. Mirza Jawad Maleki Tabrizi spent the spiritual perfection and higher stages of the worlds of the soul under him and had received permission from him to narrate and transfer Hadiths (a kind of permission in Islamic seminary levels that is a sign of trust). In the field of ethics and mysticism, Mirza Jawad Maleki Tabrizi was one of the best students of Husayn Quli Hamadani 's school.
- Seyyed Morteza Keshmiri

Some have said that Mirza Jawad Maleki Tabrizi also had permission to narrate and transfer Hadiths from Murtadha al-Ansari.

Mirza Jawad Maleki Tabrizi came to Iran around 1903 (1321 AH) and promoted religious sciences in his hometown Tabriz. In 1911 (1329 AH), due to the Persian Constitutional Revolution and unfavorable situation in Tabriz, he went to Qom. He stayed in Qom until the end of his life and was engaged in training clerics there. When Abdul-Karim Haeri Yazdi came to Qom and established the seminary in Qom, Mirza Jawad Maleki Tabrizi formed the class of ethics and self-purification, under which many students were trained. His ethics lesson was of two kinds: a lesson that was done at his home and was specific to a number of his special students; And a lesson he taught to the public at the Feyziyeh School in Qom.

=== His disciples ===
- Sheikh Ismaeel ibn Hossein Ta'eb
- Seyyed Mahmoud Modarresi: He was a teacher of mysticism and ethics and was also active in the field of propagating Islam. He died on September 21, 1958 (Rabiʽ al-Awwal 1378 AH).
- Seyyed Hossein Fatemi Razavi Qomi: He was from Qom and taught ethics, propagating Islam and training students. He studied Irfan under Mirza Jawad Maleki Tabrizi. He died on January 6, 1970 (27 Shawwal 1389 AH) and was buried in Sheikhan cemetery.
- Seyyed Mahmoud Yazdi: Companion and friend of Mirza Jawad Maleki Tabrizi.
- Mullah Ali Masoumi Hamadani: He was born in 1895 (1313 AH) in Qorveh-e Darjazin of Hamadan Province. He spent his early education in Hamadan under Sheikh Ali Gonbadi and some of other masters. Then he traveled to Tehran and benefited from the lessons of Islamic thinkers such as Mullah Mohammad Zanjani Hidaji. He emigrated to Qom in 1922 (1340 AH) for more educations. And attended the lesson of Mirza Jawad Maleki Tabrizi there. Mirza Jawad Maleki Tabrizi 's lessons had a profound effect on him. The effect that always accompanied him. In addition to sweet and passionate poems with the pseudonym "Fana", twelve volumes of books are remembered from him. He died on July 23, 1978 (17th of Sha'ban in 1398 AH).
- Mahmoud Mojtahedi: He has been a student of Mirza Jawad Maleki Tabrizi for a long time.
- Sheikh Abbas Tehrani: He worked hard in path of perfection and achieved spiritual degrees and conquests. The believers benefited a lot from his ethics lesson, which he taught at the Hujjatiyya Seminary in Qom. He writes beautiful poems and a collection of poems has been left by him.
- Mirza Abdullah Shaalchi: He studied under Mirza Jawad Maleki Tabrizi for many years and achieved a remarkable enlightenment of spirituality. He received private spiritual instructions from Mirza Jawad Maleki Tabrizi. He died at the age of one hundred and three on January 18, 1985 (28 Dey 1363 SH).
- Sheikh Hassan Lankarani: Author of the book "Al-Molhemaat al-Qaravieh fi Ahkaam al-Hajj" (Arabic: الملهمات الغروية فی أحكام الحج).
- Mirza Jawad Soltan ol-Qorayi Tabrizi: He was born in 1901 (1319 AH) in Tabriz. He studied under Mirza Jawad Maleki Tabrizi in Najaf. He was a master of the art of calligraphy. He has authored valuable books in theology, philosophy and Islamic sciences. In addition to full knowledge of the sciences of Islamic jurisprudence and principles, Persian and Arabic literature, hadith and rijal, he was also proficient in history, geography, astronomy and mathematics. He died on December 1, 1997 (10 Azar 1376 SH) at the age of 96.
- Shahab ud-Din Mar'ashi Najafi: Mirza Jawad Maleki Tabrizi gave him the permission of narrate and transfer of Hadiths.
- Seyyed Mohammad Sadegh Lawaasaani: He studied two years of ethics lessons under Mirza Jawad Maleki Tabrizi.
- Ahmad Moshref Hosseini: He was born in Qom. He has been propagating the Islamic rules and publishing Islamic teachings in Darrud.
- Mohammad Ali Araki
- Seyyed Jafar Hosseini Shahrudi: He was born in 1915 (1294 SH). He went to Mashhad and Qom to study Islamic sciences. He studied under Mirza Jawad Maleki Tabrizi and then went to Najaf for more educations. Finally he reached the Ijtihad faculty. In 1945 (1324 SH), he returned to Iran and engaged in religious services and the dissemination of Islamic knowledge. He died on June 4, 1973 (14 Khordad 1352 SH) and was buried in Sheikhan cemetery in Qom.
- Seyyed Mahdi Kashfi Borujerdi
- Mohammad Kazem Shariatmadari
- Khalil Kamarah'i: He studied in Qom under Mirza Jawad Maleki Tabrizi.

It is known that Ruhollah Khomeini (the founder of the Islamic Republic of Iran) was also a student of Mirza Jawad Maleki Tabrizi, but Ali Khamenei (the second and current supreme leader of Iran) quotes Ruhollah Khomeini as saying that he attended only two sessions of Mirza Jawad Maleki Tabrizi 's course and regretted that he could not attend his course any more.

== Bibliography ==
Mirza Jawad Maleki Tabrizi 's books are in Arabic and Persian. Ruhollah Khomeini (the founder of the Islamic Republic of Iran) has recommended reading his books.

- Asrar al-Salat (Arabic: اسرار الصلاة): Contains a thousand tips from the secrets of Salah (prayers performed by Muslims).
- Al-Moraqibat (Amaal al-Sennah) (Arabic: المراقبات (اعمال السنه)): Contains the acts of worship of different Islamic months and their spiritual effects and blessings.
- Resaleh Leqa Allah (Arabic: رساله لقاءالله): Discusses the meaning of "meeting God" and related Quran verses, divine names and the greatest name of Him, as well as a guide to the spiritual path.
- Ketabi dar Fiqh (Persian: کتابی در فقه): This book has not been published yet. It has been about the issues of Islamic jurisprudence in the chapter of Marriage.
- Resaleh ee Darbareh Hajj (Arabic: رساله‌ای درباره حج): About Hajj pilgrimage.
- Hashieh Farsi bar Qayat al-Qaswa (Persian: حاشیه فارسی بر غایة‌القصوی): Description of the Islamic jurisprudence book "Qayat al-Qaswa" by Abbas Qomi which is a Persian translation of the book Al-Urwah al-Wuthqa by Mohammed Kazem Yazdi.
- Resaleh ee dar Usul (Persian: رساله‌ای در اصول): A treatise in Principles of Islamic jurisprudence.
- Resaleh ee dar Seir o Soluk (Persian: رساله‌اى در سير و سلوك): A treatise in describe of spiritual path.

== Death ==
Mirza Jawad Maleki Tabrizi died on July 3, 1925 (11 Dhu al-Hijjah 1343 AH). His tomb is located in Sheikhan cemetery in Qom, Iran.

== See also ==
- Hibatuddin Shahrestani
- Abdul Karim Kho'ini Zanjani
- Agha Zia ol Din Araghi
- Mohammad Jawad al-Balaghi
- Ali Asghar Mazandarani
- Mohammad Hossein Esheni Qudejani
- Noureddin Qudejani Esheni
- List of deceased maraji
- Mirza Javad Agha Tehrani
- Seyed Abolhassan Shams Abadi
