= Hossein Mazaheri =

Iranian Grand Ayatollah (born 1933)

Grand Ayatollah Hossein Mazaheri Isfahani
- آیت الله العظمی حسین مظاهری اصفهانی
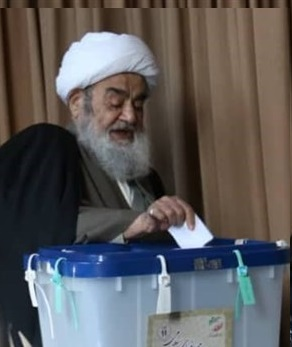
- Title: Grand Ayatollah

Personal life
- Born: 16 November 1933 (age 93) Isfahan, Iran
- Website: Official Website

Religious life
- Religion: Islam
- Denomination: Twelwer Shi'a
- Jurisprudence: Ja'fari
- Creed: Usuli

Muslim leader
- Based in: Isfahan, Iran
- Post: Grand Ayatollah

Grand Ayatollah Hossein Mazaheri Isfahani (Persian: حسین مظاهری اصفهانی; born 16 November 1933) is an Iranian senior Twelver Shia Marja. He was also a member of the Third Assembly of Experts.

== Biography ==
Hossein Mazaheri was born in Isfahan in 1933. At the age of 14, he moved to Isfahan Seminary to start his religious studies. Five years later, he moved to Qom to complete his studies. In Qom he studied in Seminars of Grand Ayatollah Boroujerdi and Imam Khomeini. Ayatollah Marashi Najafi, Allamah Tabatabei and Mohaqeq Damad were also among his teachers. He currently resides and teaches in the Seminary of Isfahan, Iran.

== Political activities ==
Before the 1979 Revolution, Hossein Mazaheri worked against the Pahlavi government and supported the creation of an Islamic government. He was a long-time member of the Society of Seminary Scholars of Qom and helped publish statements against the Pahlavi government.

On May 28, 2026, a bill presented to the U.S. Congress stated that Ayatollah Hossein Mazaheri had issued a fatwa against Donald Trump, Benjamin Netanyahu, and others, accusing them of moharebeh.

== Works ==
Mazaheri wrote many books on Islamic law, beliefs, ethics, mysticism, hadith, Islamic economics, history, and the lives of religious figures. His works on Islamic law include al-Hashiya 'ala al-Urwa al-Wuthqa, Risalah Tawzih al-Masa'il, Fiqh al-Wilaya wa al-Hukuma al-Islamiyya in three volumes, and Nukteh-hayi Piramun-e Velayat-e Faqih wa Hokumat-e Dini. In the field of hadith narrators, he wrote al-Thiqah al-Akhyar min Ruwat al-Akhbar. His books on ethics include Jihad ba Nafs in four volumes, Kavoshi Now dar Akhlaq-e Islami in two volumes, Danesh-e Akhlaq-e Islami in four volumes, Akhlaq wa Khodsazi dar Maktab-e Ahl al-Bayt, and Tarbiyat-e Farzand dar Islam. On mysticism and prayers, he wrote Asrar-e Hajj, Seyr wa Soluk, Sharh wa Tafsir-e Dua-ye Kumayl, Sharh wa Tafsir-e Dua-ye Sahar, and Sharh wa Tafsir-e Munajat-e Sha'baniyeh. His works on Islamic economics include Ahkam-e Eqtesadi dar Mored-e Zamin, Moqayeseh beyn-e System-e Eqtesadi in three volumes, and al-Tawazun al-Islami bayn al-Dunya wa al-Akhira. His works on history and the lives of religious figures include Zendegani-ye Chahardeh Masum, Tajalli-ye Haqq, and Mazhar-e Haqq.

== See also ==
- List of current maraji
- Qom
- Ijtihad
- Marja
