= Hibatuddin Shahrestani =

Islamic scholar

Sayyid Hibatuddin Shahrestani
- سید هبة الدین شهرستانی
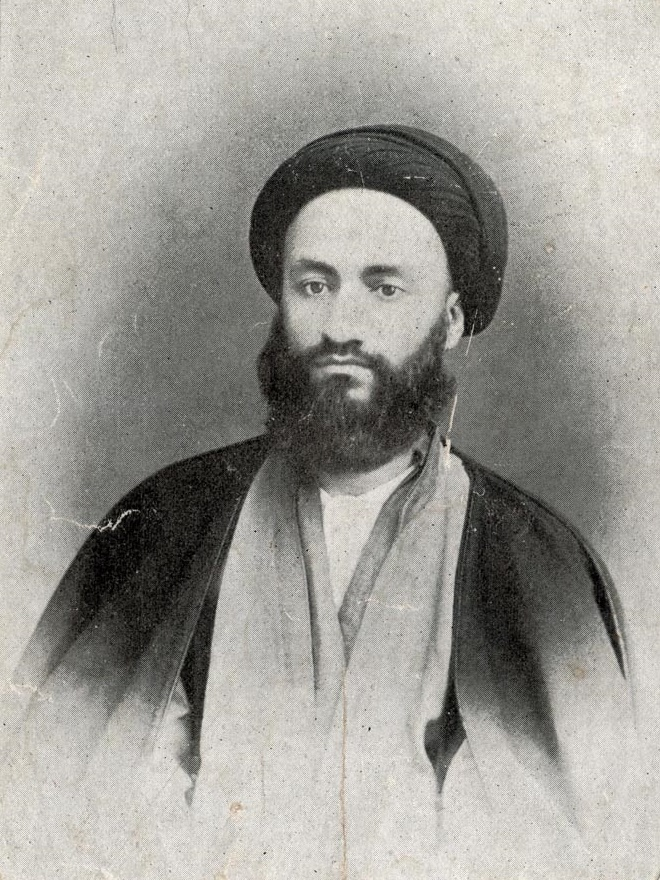
- Born: Sayyid Muhammad Ali Hosseini Shahrestani; May 20, 1884 (Rajab 24, 1301 AH); Samarra, Iraq
- Died: February 7, 1967 (Shawwal 26, 1386 AH); Baghdad, Iraq
- Burial place: Al-Kadhimiya Mosque, Kādhimayn, Baghdad, Iraq; 33°22′48″N 44°20′17″E
- Occupations: Islamic scholar; Mujtahid; Quran exegete
- Parents: Sayyid Hossein Haeri Kazemi (father); Maryam Shahrestani (mother)
- Relatives: His lineage goes back to Zayd ibn Ali through thirty intermediaries

Sayyid Muhammad Ali Hosseini Shahrestani known as Hibatuddin Shahrestani, was an Iraqi Shiite cleric and an Islamic scholar and Mujtahid, Quran exegete.

== Birth and lineage ==
Hibatuddin Shahrestani was born in Samarra on the morning of 20 May 1884 (24th of Rajab 1301 AH). His father was Sayyid Hossein Haeri Kazemi, was a scholar and spent most of his time researching religious and spiritual issues. Sayyid Hossein Haeri Kazemi authored four books of "Al-Futuhat Al-Ghaybiyyah Fi Al-Khutum" (Arabic: الفتوحات الغیبیه فی الختوم), "Al-Ahraaz" (Arabic: الاحراز), "Al-Adiyyah" (Arabic: الادعیه) and "Damu'ah Al-Sham'ah Fi Adiyyah Laylat Al-Jum'ah" (Arabic: دموع الشمعه فی ادعیه لیله الجمعه). Hibatuddin Shahrestani 's mother was Maryam from Sayyidahs of Isfahan and the children of Mirza Muhammad Mahdi Shahrestani. Hibatuddin Shahrestani 's lineage goes back to Zayd ibn Ali, the son of Ali ibn Husayn, through thirty intermediaries.

== Educations and careers ==
Shahrestani spent his childhood in Karbala. From the age of ten, he studied the basics and elementary Islamic courses. In addition to the common Arabic literary sciences (such as morphology, syntax, logic, meanings, expression, novelty), he learned the sciences of Arabic prosody, arithmetic, geometry, astronomy, history, Biographical evaluation, Fiqh, Hadith studies and Hadith terminology and graduated in them during 9 years. During this period, he also studied nations sects and creeds and philosophical and theological issues, and with the ability to write at this age, he wrote books in these sciences in prose. His father, Sayyid Hossein Haeri Kazemi, died in February 1902 (Dhu al-Qadah of 1319 AH) at the age of seventy. At the age of nineteen, shortly after the death of his father, he left Karbala for Najaf on 23 November 1902 (21 Sha'ban of 1320 AH). In Najaf, he benefited from the school of masters such as Muhammad Kadhim Khorasani, Mohammed Kazem Yazdi and Fethullah Qa'ravi Isfahani. In 1905 (1323 AH), he began to learn under Mohammad Bagher Estahbanati and benefited from his lessons. In the same period, he authored the book "Adaae al-Farz fi Sokoun al-Arz" (Arabic: اداء الفرض فی سکون الارض). Shortly afterwards, he became acquainted with new astronomical knowledge. He pursued this knowledge and decided to write the book "Naqz al-Farz fi Isbaat Harakah al-Arz" (Arabic: نقض الفرض فی اثبات حرکه الارض). After a while in 1906, he began to write the book "Al-Hey'ah va al-Islam" (Arabic: الهیئه و الاسلام) and introduced his new theories of astronomy according to Islamic sciences in it. It was a philosophical-political treatise that dealt with the harmonization of Islamic law with some aspects of Western civilization and culture, namely scientific discoveries, especially the science of the astronomy and new philosophies. Of course, he relied mainly on Islamic law and heritage. It probably took until 1912 to write it. Shahrestani continued his religious studies in the Najaf seminary and finally he became one of the Shiite mujtahids.

In addition to conventional Islamic sciences, he also studied new sciences. From his youth, Shahrestani was associated with reformist ideas and engaged with contemporary debates in Islamic thought. From the early stages of his career, he corresponded with Sunni scholars and thinkers, including Egyptian Mufti Muhammad Abduh, Rashid Rida editor-in-chief of Al-Manār magazine, and with the publishers and writers of Al-Muqtataf and Al-Hilal magazines. Through this correspondence, he maintained scholarly exchanges between Shiite institutions and cultural centers in Egypt and Syria, and as a result, his articles, poems and reports were published in the magazines of the Arab world.

He put the teaching of philosophy and abandoned intellectual knowledge in Islamic seminaries on the agenda and in his various lectures and writings, he called on students and the people to learn new sciences.

== Socio-political activities ==
- Establishment of "Islah" Islamic School in Bahrain
- Establishment of "Islam" School in Bahrain
- Establishment of an "Invitation House of Islam" in Bahrain, this center was established in contrast to the invitations of Christian missionaries in Bahrain

Shahrestani, went to Bahrain in August 1912 (Ramadan of 1330 AH) and researched Christian missionaries claims and organization, and then established two new Islamic schools called "Islah" and "Islam" for the education of children and adolescents. In addition, he gave speeches and formed various Islamic associations, and sought to counter Christian missionary activities through the establishment of Islamic schools and associations.

- Support of Muslims in India for their independence

He left Bahrain for India because, in his view, Muslims in India were under significant political and cultural pressure from British colonial authorities, Hindu nationalist movements, and conservative religious scholars. In that country, he gave lectures and published articles in various magazines and founded several Islamic associations and decided to travel to Japan, but with the beginning of World War I in July 1914 (Ramadan of 1332 AH), he gave up that work and went to Yemen and from there to Hejaz and then returned to Najaf. He wanted to unite all Islamic organizations and associations by establishing a central association in Najaf and establish an active link between them, but these efforts failed as World War I continued.

- Active participation in the establishment of "Al-Murshid" Magazine

In 1906 (1324 AH), during the Iranian constitutional movement, in addition to publishing articles and giving speeches in support of it, he participated in overt and covert meetings of constitutionalists.

- The publication of "Al-Ilm" magazine

Shahrestani began publishing "Al-Ilm" magazine in 1910 (1328 AH) in Najaf, which lasted for almost two years. It is said that the corrective approach of this magazine was unprecedented in Najaf seminary until that time, and for this reason, there were written conflicts between him and Abd al-Husayn Sharaf al-Din al-Musawi.

- Establishment of "Al-Jawadain" Public Library next to the Al-Kadhimayn Shrine in 1941 (1360 AH).
- Struggle against colonial governments during World War I
- Establishing an inseparable link and coordination between Shiite and Sunni cultural centers in Iraq, Egypt and Syria

=== Responsibilities ===
- Ministry of Education of Iraq

In 1921 (1339 AH), he was elected as Minister of Education of Iraq, but due to the measures he took to reform the education system, was not favored by the government of the time, so he resigned from this position in 1922 (1340 AH). The term of Shahrestani's ministry lasted about eleven months. However, he was engaged in research and writing. Some of the reforms he made during this time are:

1. Return the assigned positions from foreign officials and professors to domestic staff and teachers, and vacated the Ministry of Education from foreigners.
2. Dismissal of British undersecretary in the Ministry of Education of Iraq.
3. Sending some students to Syria and Europe to acquire knowledge.
4. Establishing many schools across Iraq and mobile schools for nomads, high schools and vocational schools in the states, without any increasing of government funding.
5. The formation of education councils in the Iraqi states, under the chairmanship of the governor of each state. And the formation of an association in Baghdad, which was the center of these councils. These councils were intended to promote education and public morality in the Iraqi states.
6. Planning and allocating state budgets for educational purposes with the funding from Iraqi capitalists.
7. Establishment of new buildings for schools and the recapture of the British-occupied Baghdad School of Industry with its other endowments.
8. Changing the principles of teaching to a good and correct style, with the consultation and agreement of the opinions of great scientists and the division of the educational areas into five regions, which the Ministry of Education of Iran adapted and implemented this scheme too after one year.
9. Pay special attention to the religion of the students and to the congregational prayers, especially in the teachers' colleges.
- President of the Supreme Court of Iraq called "Tamyeeze Jafari" for eleven years

In 1924 (1342 AH), by the order of the Iraqi government and the emphasis of the scholars of the time, he took over the presidency of the Supreme Court of Iraq, which became known later as the "Tamyeeze Jafari" parliament. Efforts to organize legal courts and link them to the Supreme Court, selecting competent judges, verdicts definition, and setting the necessary rules of trial procedure are part of the actions of Shahrestani in this position.

- Representation of the National Assembly of Iraq

In 1933 (1352 AH), at the request of the people of Baghdad, Shahrestani was elected as one of the members of the National Assembly of Iraq until the dissolution of the Assembly.

=== Reforms and measures for Muslims unity ===
Shahrestani went to India to propagate the Islam religion. He planned to go to Japan to propagate the Islam after meeting with India's scholars and forming a religious association, but his meeting with Jalaluddin Kashani changed his course. Jalaluddin Kashani who was the author of Habl al-Matin magazine, considered the trip to Japan ineffective. Hence, Shahrestani went to Yemen and from there traveled to Hejaz, Syria, Lebanon, Iran and then returned to Najaf. He planned to form a religious association in each land and link it with the central association of Najaf. So that in critical situations, these centers can take action and protect the boundaries of belief and religion.

=== Involvement in World War I and Iraqi revolt of 1920 ===
In 1914 (1332 AH), during the First World War, Shahrestani together with clerics such as Fethullah Qa'ravi Isfahani, Muhammad Kadhim Khorasani and Seyyed Mostafa Kashani, raised the flag of Imam Ali Shrine and joined armed resistance against British forces. He also took an active part in the Iraqi Shiite struggle and participated in the Iraqi revolt of 1920, which opposed British rule in Iraq, for which he was imprisoned for a time in the city of Hillah.

Shahrestani took part in the Iraqi revolt of 1920. From the early of 1905 (1323 AH) to the end of February 1916 (Rabiʽ al-Thani 1334 AH), he traveled across the country for coordination against British colonial forces and associated groups in Iraq, during this time he traveled from the Euphrates shores to Basra and from the Tigris shores to Kut-al-Imara. And he always tried to attract the believing popular forces. In 1920 (1338 AH) he joined the Iraqi revolution and under the leadership of Ayatollah Mirza Taqi al-Shirazi he took part in uprisings against British and allied forces in Iraq. In the midst of this battle, Mirza Taqi al-Shirazi passed away and Shahrestani was arrested and taken prisoner with another group and was sentenced to death by a military court for his role in the uprising. Nine months had passed since his arrestment until in 1921 (1339 AH) when the British government issued a general amnesty order and he was released from prison.

=== Activities chronology ===
Here are the chronology of his life and his most important activities:

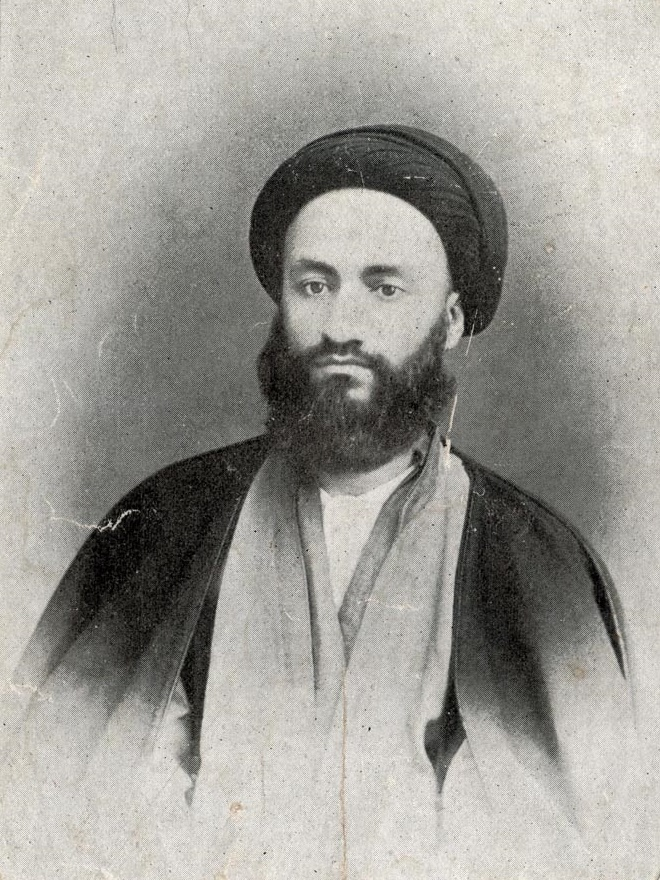
Hibatuddin Shahrestani, circa 1914.

- May 20, 1884 (24 Rajab 1301 AH): His birth.
- 1893 (1311 AH): Start studying in Islamic schools in Karbala.
- February 1902 (Dhu al-Qadah 1319 AH): The death of his father.
- November 23, 1902 (21 Sha'ban 1320 AH): Emigration from Kadhimiya and Karbala to Najaf to continue his education.
- December 1902 (Ramadan 1320 AH): trip to Bahrain.
- December 1902 (Ramadan 1320 AH): Establishment of two schools of "Islah" and "Islam" in Bahrain.
- 1905 (1323 AH): Study under Mohammad Bagher Estahbanati.
- 1905 (1323 AH): Compilation of the book "Adaae al-Farz fi Sokoun al-Arz" (Arabic: اداء الفرض فی سکون الارض)
- 1906 (1324 AH): Participate in the meetings of Iranian constitutionalists in Najaf and work for it.
- 1906 (1324 AH): Compilation of the book "Naqz al-Farz fi Isbaat Harakah al-Arz" (Arabic: نقض الفرض فی اثبات حرکه الارض)
- November 1906 (Ramadan 1324 AH): The beginning of writing the book "Al-Hey'ah va al-Islam" (Arabic: الهیئه و الاسلام)
- 1910 (1328 AH): Publication of religious, philosophical and scientific monthly "Al-Ilm" magazine.
- September 1912 (Shawwal 1330 AH): The establishment of the "Society of the Staff of Islam" (Arabic: جمعیه خدمه الإسلام) in Baghdad.
- October 1912 (Dhu al-Qadah 1330 AH): The establishment of the "Islamic Society" (Arabic: الجامعه الاسلامیه).
- December 1912 (Muharram 1331 AH): The establishment of the "Reform Society" (Arabic: جمعیه الاصلاح) in Bahrain.
- 1912 (1331 AH): The establishment of the "Union of Scholars" (Arabic: جمعیه الاتفاق العلماء) in Oman.
- February 1913 (Rabiʽ al-Awwal 1331 AH): Travel to India and warm welcome of people and officials.
- February 1913 (Rabiʽ al-Awwal 1331 AH): He gave lectures and wrote articles criticizing practices he considered un-Islamic and calling for religious reform.
- February 1913 (Rabiʽ al-Awwal 1331 AH): The establishment of the "Allah's Recruit Society" (Arabic: جمعیه جندالله) in Kolkata, India.
- April 1913 (Jumada al-awwal 1331 AH): The establishment of "Ale-Muhammad Society" (Arabic: جمعیه آل محمد) in Al Bahah.
- May 1913 (Jumada al-Thani 1331 AH): The establishment of "Islamic Publication Society" (Arabic: جمعیه انتشار اسلامی) in Allahabad.
- July 1913 (Sha'ban 1331 AH): The establishment of "Reinforcement Society" (Arabic: جمعیه التقویه) in Jabis.
- November 1913 (Dhu al-Hijjah 1331 AH): The establishment of "Society of the People of Truth" (Arabic: جمعیه اهل الحق) in Yemen.
- November 1913 (Dhu al-Hijjah 1331 AH): Go to Hajj pilgrimage.
- November 1913 (Dhu al-Hijjah 1331 AH): Compilation of the book "Ad'iyat al-Quran" (Arabic: ادعیه القرآن).
- November 1913 (Dhu al-Hijjah 1331 AH): Travel to Syria, Lebanon, Iran and Basra.
- 1914 (1332 AH): Travel to Yemen.
- December 1914 (Muharram 1333 AH): Issuing the fatwa of jihad against Britain, France and Russia.
- December 11, 1914 (23 Muharram 1333 AH): Announcing his fatwa in mosques and inviting people to participate in the jihad.
- November 29, 1915 (21 Muharram 1334 AH): The arrival of the legion of volunteers against colonialism led by Hibatuddin Shahrestani to Baghdad.
- 1920 (1338 AH): The establishment of the secret organization "Islamic National Assembly" (Arabic: الجمعیه الوطنیه الاسلامیه) against the British colonizers.
- May 30, 1921 (22 Ramadan 1339 AH): The issuance of the death sentence against Hibatuddin Shahrestani for his struggles.
- 1921 (1339 AH): Release from the jail after nine months of captivity.
- 1921 (1339 AH): Release from prison and execution for general amnesty.
- September 28, 1921 (25 Muharram 1340 AH): Appointed to the Ministry of Education of Iraq.
- August 14, 1922 (20 Dhu al-Hijjah 1340 AH): Resignation from the Ministry of Education of Iraq.
- August 14, 1923 (1 Muharram 1342 AH): Accepting the presidency of the "Jafari Shiite Assembly".
- 1924 (1342 AH): Accepting the presidency of the Supreme Court of Iraq "Tamyeeze Jafari".
- 1924 (1342 AH): Eye disease and impaired vision and the onset of low vision and then blindness.
- December 1925 (Jumada al-awwal 1344 AH): Establishment of "Al-Murshid Magazine" in Baghdad.
- 1926 (1345 AH): Eye surgery and temporary recovery.
- 1930 (1349 AH): A trip to Syria for eye treatment.
- 1934 (1353 AH): Resignation from the Supreme Court of Iraq "Tamyeeze Jafari".
- 1934 (1353 AH): Participate in the National Assembly elections of Iraq.
- 1934 (1353 AH): Elected by the people of Baghdad to represent the parliament.
- February 1935 (Dhu al-Qadah 1353 AH): Withdrawal from the parliament due to the crisis and the dissolution of the parliament.
- 1935 (1354 AH): Beginning of the establishment of "Al-Jawadain Public Library" (Arabic: مکتبه الجوادین العامه) next to the Al-Kadhimayn Shrine.
- February 7, 1967 (26 Shawwal 1386 AH): His death.

== Works ==
Shahrestani's writings and works amount to over one hundred volumes of books and treatises in various Islamic sciences and fields in Arabic and Persian languages. Elsewhere, the number of his writings is mentioned as more than three hundred and fifty volumes. The names of some of which are given here.

=== Quranic ===
- Al-Mohit (Arabic: المحیط): It is an extended Tafsir of Quran in eight large volumes written in a new way but is incomplete.
- Hujjat al-Islam (Arabic: حجه الاسلام): The summary of the book "Al-Mohit" mentioned above.
- Siraj al-Miraj (Arabic: سراج المعراج): In interpreting the Quran verses of Mi'raj and solving its issues.
- Tafsir Surah Waqi'a (Arabic: تفسیر سوره واقعه): Tafsir of Waqi'a Surah. An important part of it has been published in the monthly "Al-Murshid" in Baghdad.
- Resaleh Dhu al-Qarnayn (Arabic: رساله ذوالقرنین): Which is written to solve the issues of the Quran verses about the story of Dhu al-Qarnayn.
- Sadde Yajoj va Majoj (Arabic: سد یأجوج و ماجوج): Which is written to solve the issues of the Quran verses about the story of Gog and Magog.
- Al-Jame'at al-Islamiyah va al-Aqaid al-Quraniyah (Arabic: الجامعة الاسلامية و العقائـد القرآنيـة): In proving the five principles of the Shia Islam religion with Quranic verses.
- Al-Tafsir al-Yasir le-Surat al-Fatihah wa Jazai Tabaarak wa Am min Kitab al-Ali al-Qadir (Arabic: التفسير اليسير لسورة الفاتحة و جزأي تبارك و عـم مـن كتـاب العلـي القدير)
- Sirr Tashabuh al-Quran (Arabic: سر تشابه القرآن)
- Al-Moejizat al-Khalidah (Arabic: المعجزه الخالدة)

=== Theology and philosophy ===
- Al-Intiqad Hawli Tashih al-Itiqad (Arabic: الانتقاد حول تصحیح الاعتقاد): A part of this book has been published in "Al-Murshid" monthly, but it is unfinished.
- Al-Ma'arif al-Aaliah lel-Madaaris al-Iraqiyah (Arabic: المعارف العالیه للمدارس العراقیه): It is a religious, scientific and philosophical textbook for Iraqi schools that only the first volume has been published.
- Dein al-Bashar fi al-Tariqat al-Saalehah le-Sair al-Insan (Arabic: دین البشر فی الطریقه الصالحه لسیرالانسان)
- Al-Rouhiaat (Arabic: الروحیات): Which is also called Al-Kitab al-Maftouh ila Awaalim al-Rouh (Arabic: الکتاب المفتوح الی عوالم الروح)
- Al-Imamah va al-Ummah (Arabic: الامامه و الامه)
- Al-Fareq fi Foraq al-Islam (Arabic: الفارق فی فرق الاسلام)
- Mavaahib al-Moshaahid fi Wajibaat al-Aqayid (Arabic: مواهب المشاهد فی واجبات العقاید): It is a poetic work in theology.
- Nazm al-Aqayid (Arabic: نظم العقاید): Summary of the book "Mavaahib al-Moshaahid fi Wajibaat al-Aqayid" mentioned above.
- Towhid Ahl al-Towhid (Arabic: توحید اهل التوحید): This book proves the principles of Islamic beliefs only with Quran verses and rational arguments.
- Fayz al-Baari aw Islah Manzumat al-Sabzavari va Hiya Usul al-Falsafat al-Aliyah (Arabic: فيض الباري او اصلاح منظومة السبزواري و هي اصول الفلسـفه العاليـة): It is a book on the refinement of Hadi Sabzevari's book "Šarḥ al-Manẓuma".
- Al-Qout va al-Malakout (Arabic: القوت و الملکوت): In proving monotheism.
- Al-Jabr va al-Ikhtiar (Arabic: الجبر و الاختیار)
- Al-Shia va al-Nasebiah (Arabic: الشیعه و الناصبیه)
- Ta'aliqah ala al-Nokat al-Itiqadiyah (Arabic: تعالیقه علی النکت الاعتقادیه): Comments on the book "Nokat al-Itiqadiyah" by Al-Shaykh Al-Mufid, which has been published in Tehran.
- Zikri al-Soufiah (Arabic: ذکری الصوفیه): It is a poetic work in rejection of Sufism.
- Holoul al-Holoul (Arabic: حلول الحلول): In rejection of Sufism.
- Al-Marjaniyah fi Talkhis al-Manzumat al-Itiqadiyah (Arabic: المرجانية في تلخيص المنظومـة الاعتقاديـة)
- Falsafeh al-Istikmaal va Usulihaa (Arabic: فلســفه الاستكمال و اصولها)
- Hadith ma'a al-Duat al-Burutestaniyayn (Arabic: حديث مع الدعاة البروتسـتانيين)
- Al-Radd ala al-Babiyah (Arabic: الـرد علـي البابيه)
- Al-Qaliyah fi Radd al-Moqaliyah (Arabic: الغالية في رد المغاليـة)

=== Jurisprudence and principles ===
- Fayz al-Saahil va Ojoubat Masa'il Ahl al-Sawahil (Arabic: فیض الساحل و اجوبة مسائل اهل السواحل)
- Tahrim Naql Al-Jana'iz al-Motaqayerah (Arabic: تحریم نقل الجنائز المتغیره): It is a revised treatise that has been published several times. Abd al-Husayn Sharaf al-Din al-Musawi has written the book "Boqyat al-Fa'iz fi Jawaz Naql al-Jana'iz" (Arabic: بغیة الفائز فی جواز نقل الجنائز) in rejection of this book.
- Yaqut al-Nahr fi Miqat al-Bahr (Arabic: یاقوت النحر فی میقات البحر)
- Kitab fi Ahkaam Ahl al-Kitab (Arabic: کتاب فی احکام اهل الکتاب)
- Hikmat al-Ahkaam (Arabic: حکمه الاحکام): Which discusses the philosophy of legislation and still unfinished.
- Horiat al-Fikr bel-Ijtihad (Arabic: حریه الفکر بالاجتهاد): Which is not completed.
- Al-Takattof va al-Isbaal (Arabic: التکتف و الاسبال)
- Dalil al-Qazaah (Arabic: دلیل القضاه): Which is two volumes.
- Hokumat al-Haqq (Arabic: حكومة الحق): About the laws of European wisdom and their social rules and its adaption to the religion of Islam.
- Al-Fayyaz Hawaash Ala al-Riyaz (Arabic: الفیاض حواش علی الریاض): Not yet gathered.
- Fiqh Hay (Arabic: فقه حی): Which is not completed.
- Resaleh ee dar Sowm (Persian: رساله‌ای در صوم)
- Resalah fi Wojoub Salah al-Jum'ah (Arabic: رساله فی وجوب صلاه الجمعه)
- Al-Azwaaj al-Mowaqqat (Arabic: الزواج الموقت)
- Weqayah al-Mahsoul fi Sharhi Kifayat al-Osoul (Arabic: وقایه المحصول فی شرح کفایه الاصول): In this book, the lectures of Muhammad Kadhim Khorasani gathered.
- Al-Wuquf ala Ahkam al-Awqaaf (Arabic: الوقـوف علـي احكـام الاوقاف)
- Minhaaj al-Haaj aw Manaasik Ale Muhammad (Arabic: منهاج الحاج او مناسك آل محمد)
- Asfi al-Mashaarib fi Hokam Haliq al-Lahiyat va Tatwil al-Shaarib (Arabic: اصـفي المشـارب في حكم حلق اللحية و تطويـل الشـارب)
- Al-Tanabboh fi Tahrim al-Tashabboh (Arabic: التنبه في تحريم التشبه)
- Qaab Qawsayn fi al-Salaat inda al-Qutbayn (Arabic: قاب قوسين في الصلوة عنـد القطبـين)
- Fath al-Baab le-Taqbil al-Ietaab (Arabic: فتح البـاب لتقبيـل الاعتـاب)
- Al-Hajj al-Mokhattar, Javaab al-Saailin an el-Hajj fi Soltat al-Wahabiyayn (Arabic: الحج المخطر، جواب السائلين عن الحج فـي سـلطة الوهـابيين)
- Raahnamaye Yahud va Nasaaraa: ya Bibleha (Persian: راهنمای يهود و نصارا: يا بيبلها)

=== History ===
- Sirah Khayrah al-Bashar (Arabic: سیره خیره البشر): Which is in the history of Islam prophet Muhammad ibn Abdullah in a strange way that leads the reader to the conclusion of acknowledge Muhammad's mission.
- Ketab Amir al-Momenin Ali (a) (Persian: کتاب امیرالمؤمنین علی (ع)): Which is in the history and virtues of Imam Ali.
- Nihzat al-Husayn (Arabic: نهضة الحسین (ع)): In the history of Imam Hussein. The first edition was published in 1926 (1345 AH) and has been reprinted many times since then. This book has been translated into English and Persian, which was translated into Persian by Alireza Hakim Khosravi and is called "Azemate Hossein" (Persian: عظمت حسین).
- Mokhtasar Nihzat al-Husayn (Arabic: مختصـر نهضة الحسين): Summary of the book "Nihzat al-Husayn" (Arabic: نهضة الحسین (ع)) mentioned above.
- Al-Masnoue fi Naqdi Iktifa al-Qonoue bima Howa Matboue (Arabic: المصنوع فی نقد اکتفاء القنوع بما هو مطبوع)
- Al-Khaybah fi al-Shoaybiah (Arabic: الخیبه فی الشعیبیه): Which has also been translated into Turkish.
- Kitab Zayd al-Shahid (Arabic: کتاب زید الشهید)
- Al-Tamhid fi Zayd al-Shahid (Arabic: التمهيـد فـي زيـد الشهيد)
- Siqaat al-Ruwaat (Arabic: ثقاة الروات)
- Al-Riwayat (Arabic: الروایة)
- Solalah al-Saadaat (Arabic: سلاله السادات): Which is unfinished.
- Solalah al-Saadaat fi Ansaab al-Buyut al-Shahirat min al-Itrat al-Tahirah (Arabic: سلالة السادات في انساب البيوت الشهيرة من العترة الطاهرة)
- Al-Sham'ah fi Haal Zid al-Dam'ah (Arabic: الشمعه فی حال ذی الدمعه)
- Tajomeh Jabir ibn Hayyaan al-Soufi al-Kimiawi (Arabic: ترجمه جابر بن حیان الصوفی الکیمیاوی): In 1925 (1343 AH), part of it was published in the monthly "Islah" in Baghdad.
- Tayye al-Awaalim fi Ahwaal Sheikh al-Mulla Kazim (Arabic: طی العوالم فی احوال شیخ الملا کاظم): The important part of this book was published in "Al-Ilm" monthly in 1911 (1329 AH).
- Zowi al-Ma'aali fi Zoriyah Abi al-Ma'aali (Arabic: ذوی المعالی فی ذریه ابی المعالی)
- Sadaf al-Le'aali fi Shajareh Abi al-Ma'aali (Arabic: صدف اللئـالي فـي شجره ابي المعالي)
- Al-Nobakhtiyah (Arabic: النوبختیه): Which is in the history of "Nawbakht" family.
- Al-Ilaqiyah (Arabic: الايلاقيـه)
- Silsilat al-Zahab (Arabic: سلسلة الذهب): A poetic work in the history of "Shahrestani" family.

=== Mathematics and astronomy ===
- Al-Hey'ah va al-Islam (Arabic: الهیئه و الاسلام): In Arabic and in charge of adapting the new astronomy sciences to the appearances of Islamic laws, it was published in Baghdad and its Persian translation was published in Najaf.
- Fazaalik al-Mohaasib (Arabic: فذلکه المحاسب)
- Feisal ol-Dalaael (Arabic: فیصل الدلائل): The answer to the questions asked by "Faisal", the son of the king of Muscat and the Imam of Oman.
- Adaae al-Farz fi Sokoun al-Arz (Arabic: اداء الفرض فی سکون الارض)
- Mawaqe al-Nojoum fi Tahqiq al-Samaae al-Dunya va al-Rujum (Arabic: مواقع النجوم فی تحقیق السماء الدنیا و الرجوم)
- Naqz al-Farz fi Isbaat Harakah al-Arz (Arabic: نقض الفرض فی اثبات حرکه الارض)
- Zinat al-Kawaakib fi Hey'at al-Afalaak va al-Sawaaqib (Arabic: زینه الکواکب فی هیئت الافلاک و الثواقب): Part of which was published in the first year of the monthly "Al-Ilm" and is still unfinished.
- Al-waafi al-Kaaf ya Sharhi Jabal Qaaf (Arabic: الوافي الكـاف يـا شـرح جبـل قـاف): In the history of Mount Qaf, published by the office of "Al-Murshid" magazine in Baghdad.
- Al-Shariat va al-Tabiat (Arabic: الشـريعة و الطبيعة): Which adapts the naturalities sciences of that age to the appearances of the Islamic laws.

=== Literary sciences ===
- Rawaashih al-Foyuz fi Ilm al-Uruz (Arabic: رواشح الفیوض فی علم العروض): Which was published in 1916 (1334 AH) in Tehran with the book "Mavaahib al-Moshaahid fi Wajibaat al-Aqayid" in one edition.
- Tahawwul al-Ajamah va al-Arubah (Arabic: تحوّل العجمه و العروبه): It is in the expression of words that have been quoted from Persian to Arabic and from Arabic to Persian.
- A collection containing the following treatises:
  - Risaalah Aqd al-Habaab (Arabic: رساله عقد الحباب): A poetic work about Arabs.
  - Al-Dorr va al-Marjaan (Arabic: الدر و المرجان): A poetic work in the science of semantics and eloquence.
  - Risaalah al-Awraaq fi al-Ishtiqaaq (Arabic: رساله الاوراق فی الاشتقاق)
  - Risaalah al-Sirr al-Ajib fi Talkhis Mantiq al-Tahzib (Arabic: رساله السر العجیب فی تلخیص منطق التهذیب)
  - Risaalah Qilaadah al-Nahur fi Awzaan al-Bahur (Arabic: رساله قلاده النهور فی اوزان البحور)
  - Natijat al-Mantiq (Arabic: نتیجه المنطق): In Persian language.
  - Motun al-Fonun (Arabic: متون الفنون)
  - Nadirah al-Zamaan fi Dilaalah al-Fiel ala al-Zamaan (Arabic: نادره الازمان فی دلاله الفعل علی الزمان)

=== Miscellaneous ===
- Fiqan Islam (Arabic: فغان اسلام): It was written in India and published in 1913 (1331 AH).
- Azraar al-Tadkhin (Arabic: اضرار التدخین): Which was published in 1925 (1343 AH) in Baghdad.
- Azraar al-Tadkhin ya Sharab al-Dokhan fi Nazar al-Tib Walidayn (Arabic: اضـرار التدخين يا شرب الـدخان فـي نظـر الطـب والـدين)
- Fazayel al-Faras (Arabic: فضایل الفرس): In expressing the virtues of Iranians.
- Al-Faraayid (Arabic: الفراید): Which is in several volumes.
- Al-Manaabir (Arabic: المنابر): It is a Persian book and has been written for preachers.
- Jadawil al-Riwayat (Arabic: جداول الرواية)
- Anis al-Jalis (Arabic: انیس الجلیس): Which remains unfinished.
- Anis al-Jalis fi al-Montakhab min Kolli Muzui Nafis (Arabic: انيس الجليس في المنتخب من كـل موضـوع نفـيس)
- Maa Howa Nahj al-Balaaqah (Arabic: ما هو نهج البلاغه): It was published in 1933 (1352 AH) by "Al-Irfan" magazine in Syria-Sidon. This book was translated into Persian by Seyyed Abbas Mirzadeh Ahari and published in Tehran in the religious newspaper "Nedaye Hagh" (Persian: ندای حق) and then many times under the title "What is Nahj al-Balagha?" (Persian: نهج‌البلاغه چیست؟) published with an introduction by Ali Davani.
- Hall al-Mashaakil (Arabic: حل المشاکل): In solving a thousand scientific and literary issues.
- Al-Fawayid (Arabic: الفوايد)
- Masih al-Injil aw Masih al-Quran (Arabic: مسیح الانجیل أو مسیح القرآن): In rejection of the Christian beliefs about Jesus.
- Islam Brahmi (Arabic: اسلام برهمی): It is about converting to Islam by an Indian engineer who converted to Islam as a result of an argument with the author. Part of that debate was published in the first year of "Al-Murshid" magazine.
- Qasaari al-Kalam fi Qasaari al-Hikam (Arabic: قصاری الکلم فی قصاری الحکم)
- Qasaar al-Hikam fi Qasaar al-Kalam (Arabic: قصار الحكم في قصار الكلم)
- Al-Baqiaat al-Saalihaat (Arabic: الباقیات الصالحات)
- Al-Manaat fi Shorof al-Asbaat (Arabic: المناط فی شرف الاسباط)
- Minhaaj al-Haaj (Arabic: منهاج الحاج): Published in Baghdad.
- Noor al-Naazir fi Ilm al-Miraayaa va al-Manaazir (Arabic: نور الناظر فی علم المرایا و المناظر)
- Falsafat Hibatuddin (Arabic: فلسفة هبـةالـدين)
- Tebb ol-Zo'a'fa (Arabic: طب الضعفاء)
- Al-Khataabah (Arabic: الخطابه)
- Al-Haadi ila al-Mahdi (a) (Arabic: الهادی الی المهدی (ع))
- Al-Shiat al-Naajiah (Arabic: الشيعة الناجية)
- Al-Tazkiratah li Ale Muhammad al-Khayyirah (Arabic: التذکره لآل محمد الخیره)
- Al-Majaamie al-Asnaa Ashar (Arabic: المجامیع الاثنی عشر)
- Jabal Qaaf (Arabic: جبل قاف)
- Al-Dalayel va al-Masaaeel (Arabic: الدلایل و المسائل): Of which five volumes have been published and apparently reach twenty volumes.
- Nataaej al-Tahsil (Arabic: نتائج التحصيل)
- Sabayek al-Afhaam (Arabic: سـبايك الافهـام)
- Al-Majamie al-Baghdadiyah (Arabic: المجاميع البغدادية)
- Ziwar ol-Muslimin (Arabic: زیور المسلمین): This book has been published in Arabic and Persian in Iran under the name of "Ad'iyat al-Quran" (Arabic: ادعیه القرآن), and recently reprinted as part of some books of prayers and recitations of the Quran by the publications of the Society of Seminary Teachers of Qom.
- Zabour al-Muslimin, dar Adiyat Quran Karim (Arabic: زبـور المسلمين، در ادعية قرآن كريم)
- Al-Dukhaniyah (Arabic: الدخانیه): It is a treatise about smoking during fasting.
- Al-Tanbih (Arabic: التنبیه): In the prohibition of resemblance [to infidels] which was published in 1922 (1340 AH) in Baghdad.
- Asqi al-Mashaarib (Arabic: اسغی المشارب): About shaving and lengthening the human mustache.
- Al-Taftish (Arabic: التفتیش): It is a Persian treatise on the evils of shaving the beard, published twice, first in Najaf in 1922 (1340 AH) and again in 1924 (1342 AH) in Tabriz, and "Mirza Abu Turab Hedayi" has put it in order.
- Khotab fi al-Jihad va al-Ittihad (Arabic: خطب فی الجهاد و الاتحاد)
- Al-Sa'at al-Zuwaliyah (Arabic: السـاعة الزواليـه)
- Jannat al-Ma'wa fi al-Irshad ila al-Taqwa (Arabic: جنة الماوي في الارشاد الي التقوي)
- Tanziyah al-Tanzil min al-Taqyir va al-Tabdil (Arabic: تنزيه التنزيل من التغيير و التبديل)
- Vazayef Zanan (Persian: وظـايف زنـان)
- Al-Jaann va al-Jinn (Arabic: الجان و الجن)
- Al-Ruwayd (Arabic: الرويد)
- Minhaj al-Salaf fi Tafriq al-Mokhtalif va al-Moetalif (Arabic: مـنهج السلف في تفريق المختلف و المؤتلف)
- Tarjomeh Resaaleh Qadirieh (Persian: ترجمه رساله غديريه)

=== Articles ===
- Asraar al-Sawrat aw Khawatir Sa'ah (Arabic: أسرار الثورة أو خواطر ساعة)
- Ash'aar al-Quran be-Taharrok al-Arz (Arabic: أشعار القرآن بتحرك الأرض)
- Izhaar al-Wasi Taharrok al-Arz (Arabic: إظهار الوصي تحرك الأرض)
- Ila min Yarid al-Ashiae Mahsusah (Arabic: إلي من يريد الاشياء محسوسة)
- Al-Baraahin ala Tajarrod al-Nafs (Arabic: البراهين علي تجرد الـنفس)
- Tasrih al-Din be-Kisrat Aqmaar al-Samaae (Arabic: تصريح الدين بكثرة أقمار السـماء)
- Tafsir al-Quran al-Hakim: Tafsir Surah al-Waqi'a be-Qalam al-Allama Al-Sayyid Hibatuddin al-Shahrestani Damma Zillah (Arabic: تفسير القرآن الحكيم: تفسير سوره الواقعة بقلم العلامة السيد هبـةالدين الشهرستاني دام ظلـه)
- Tanazoe al-Rouhiyah wa al-Maadiyah (Arabic: تنازع الروحية و الماديـة)
- Siqaat al-Rowaat: Al-Sayyid Hibat al-Hussayni al-Shahrestani (1301-1386 AH) (Arabic: ثقات الرواة: السيد هبة الحسيني الشهرستاني (۱۳۰۱-۱۳۸۶ه))
- Al-Husayn.. al-Wasbat al-Mawqozah (Arabic: الحسين.. الوثبة الموقظـة)
- Al-Dalaael wa al-Masaael (Arabic: الدلائل و المسائل)
- Ramadan Ramz Taqrib al-Qulub wa Talif al-Shu'oub (Arabic: رمضان رمز تقريب القلوب و تأليف الشعوب)

== Eye disease ==
Shahrestani was about forty years old (that is, in 1924 or 1342 AH) when he suffered from eye diseases and decreased vision. Surgery in 1926 (1345 AH) and hospitalization in Damascus did not result and he remained blind until the end of his life, 1967 (1386 AH). That is, he lives about half a century with the effects of low vision and blindness.

== Death ==
Shahrestani died on the night of Monday, 7 February 1967 (Shawwal 26, 1386 AH) at the age of 85 and was buried in the shrine of Musa al-Kadhim, Al-Kadhimiya Mosque, Kādhimayn, Baghdad, Iraq. Funeral ceremonies were held in Najaf, Karbala, Baghdad, Iran and other Islamic countries in respect of him.

== Commemoration conference ==
The conference in honor of Allamah Hibatuddin Shahrestani was held by the University of Kufa and The Islamic College of London on Wednesday and Thursday, March 31, 2010, and April 1, 2010, at the Faculty of Literature of the University of Kufa. In this conference, dozens of articles were presented by the professors of this university and a number of guests. The book "Sayyid Hibatuddin al-Hosseini al-Shahrestani, his life and scientific and social vitality (1301-1386 AH)" (Arabic: السید هبةالدین الحسینی الشهرستانی، حیاته و نشاطه العلمی و الاجتماعی (۱۳۰۱ _ ۱۳۸۶ق)) was commissioned by the Shiite Bibliographic Institute by the efforts of Sayyid Abdul Sattar al-Hassani al-Baghdadi. This book is the most extensive book in the biography of Hibatuddin Shahrestani.

== See also ==
- Abd al-Husayn Sharaf al-Din al-Musawi
- Muhammad Baqir al-Sadr
- Sadr al-Din al-Sadr
- Abdul-Karim Haeri Yazdi
- Abol-Ghasem Kashani
- Seyyed Mohammad Hojjat Kooh Kamari
- Mirza Jawad Agha Maleki Tabrizi
- Mohammad Hossein Esheni Qudejani
- Noureddin Esheni Qudejani
- List of deceased maraji
