= Agha Zia ol Din Araghi =

19th-century Persian Shia jurist

Agha Ziauddin Araghi
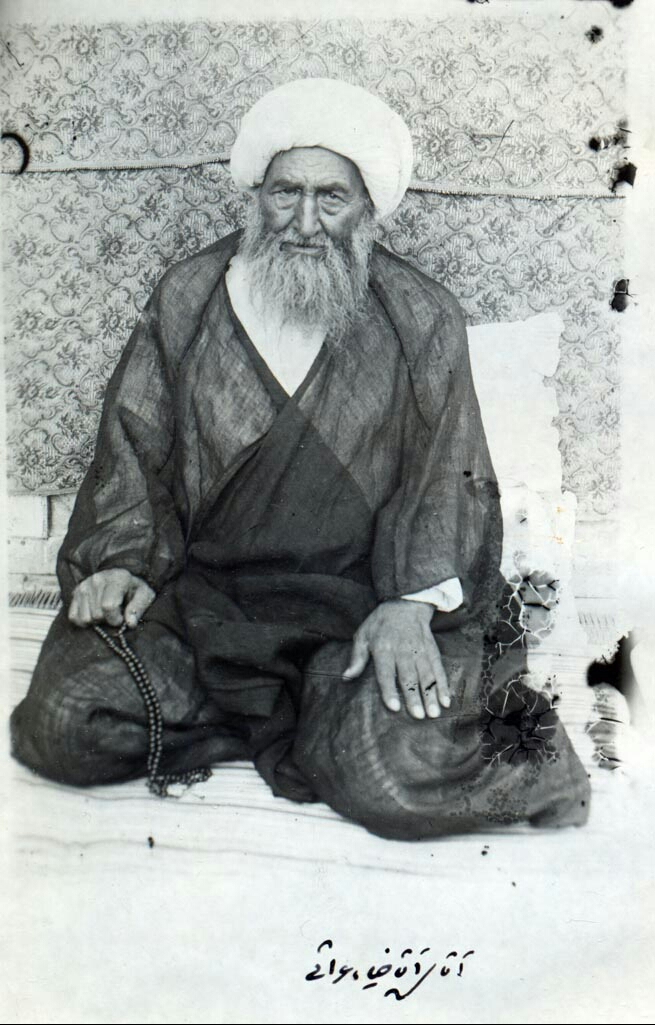
- Ayatollah Zia Addin Araki

Religious life
- Religion: Islam
- Denomination: Shia
- Sect: Twelver
- Jurisprudence: Ja'fari

Zia'eddin Araghi also known as Agha Zia'eddin Araghi (Persian: آقا ضیاء الدین عراقی) was an eminent Shia jurist, Usuli and Mujtahid during the flourishing the Usul Fiqh in Ja'fari school in Shia after Muhammad Baqir Behbahani.

== Family ==
Araghi was born in 1861 in Arak, Iran. His name was Shaykh Ali but he was known as Zia Addin. His father was Mulla Muhammad Kabir Araghi and was Shia jurist and Mujtahid.

== Education ==
First he learned the preliminary stages in Arak and then travelled to Isfahan and resided in Sadr religious school. He participated in Isfahan in the courses of Masters like Agha Sayyed Muhammad Hashim Chahar Souqi, Mirza Jahangir Khan Qashqaei, Akhun Muhammad Kashi, and Abul Ma'ali Kalbasi. Then he Immigrated to Najaf, Iraq. Before coming to Najaf, he first had the place of judge in Samara but this occupation did not satisfy him. Among his known masters in Najaf there were Mirza Habib Rashrti, Akhund Khorasani, Sayyed Muhammad Kazim Tabatabei Yazdi, Mirza Khalil Hoseini, Shaykh Al Shariah, Sayyed Muhammad Tabatabei Fesharaki, and Mirza Ebrahim Mahallati Shirazi.

== Pupils ==
He also taught many eminent pupils such as following:

- Sayyed Muhsin Hakim
- Sayyed Muhammad Taqi Khansari
- Sayyed Abul Qasem Khansari
- Sayyed Mahmud Shahroudi
- Sayyed Abul Qasem Khoei
- The late Muhammad Taqi Bahjat
- Sayyed Abdullah Shirazi
- Sayyed Abdul Hadi Shirazi
- Sayyed Aul Hasan Shirazi
- Ayatollah Qaravi Aliyari
- Shaykh Muhammad Taqi Amoli
- Mirza Hashem Amoli

== See also ==
- Mohammad-Kazem Khorasani
- Iranian Constitutional Revolution
- Intellectual movements in Iran
- Mirza Hussein Naini
- List of maraji
- Mirza Jawad Maleki Tabrizi
- Hibatuddin Shahrestani
- Mohammad Hossein Esheni Qudejani
