= Sadr Madrasa =

Madrasa in Isfahan, Iran

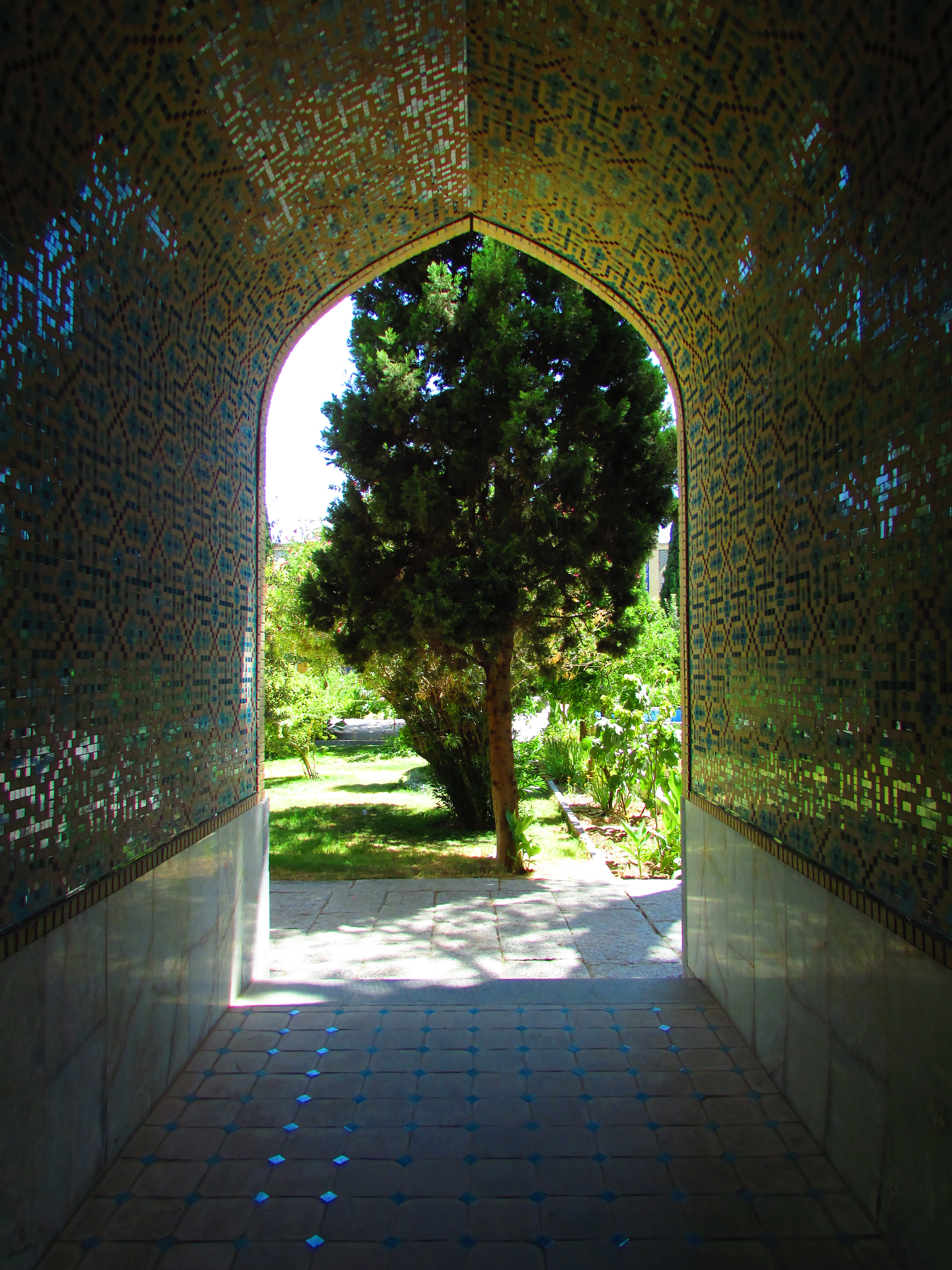

- Location within Iran

Religion
- Province: Isfahan

Location
- Location: Isfahan, Iran
- Municipality: Isfahan
- Coordinates: 32.660556°N 51.676389°E

Architecture
- Type: Madrasa
- Style: Isfahani

Sadr Madrasa (Persian: مدرسه صدر) is one of the largest madrasas in Isfahan, Iran. It was built by Mohammad Hosseyn Khan Sadr Esfahani, the governor of Isfahan during the reign of Fath-Ali Shah Qajar. Photography is prohibited in the school.
