= Mohammad Bagher Estahbanati =

Mohammad Bagher Estahbanati (Persian: محمد باقر اصطهباناتی; born 1837) was a Persian Faqīh, writer, mathematician and inventor. He was born in Estahban.

== Education ==
When Estahbanati was 12, he attended Shiraz Mansouriyah school where he stayed for eight years. In 1867, he went to Tehran with other student masters such as Mr Wise (Madras), Mohammad Hakim Qmshhay, Mirza Abolhassan Jelve, Mulla Ali Kenny and Syed Mehdi Najafi Qazvini. In 1879 he returned to Shiraz. Due to a conflict with Ghavamolmolk (the Persian ruler) he was exiled to Samarra, where he took lessons from Mirza Mohammed Hassan Husseini Shirazi which qualified him to exercise ijtihad.

After Shirazi's death, Estahbanati went to Najaf, where he founded his philosophical field. His dissertation is a collection of thousands of bits of poetry that explain the sciences, such as jurisprudence and judgements through to poetic language and religion. He was also a professor of mathematics and its affiliates. Various of his articles have remained in the field. Prevention, and health and hygiene in additional medical attention.

== Personal life ==
In 1879, Ayatollah Estahbanati married Larijani, the daughter of Mohammad Hassan. She died in 1900. He was the son of Sheikh Mohammad Taqi Ravanshad, known as Ravanshad the philosopher.

== Death ==
Estahbanati was killed during an insurrection led by the people of Shiraz. His body was interred in the garden Ghazal Hafeziyeh.

== See also ==
- Muhammad Jamaluddin al-Makki al-Amili
- Zayn al-Din al-Juba'i al'Amili
- Muhammad Baqir al-Sadr
- Five Martyrs of Shia Islam
