= Isfahan Seminary =

Islamic seminary (hawza) in Iran

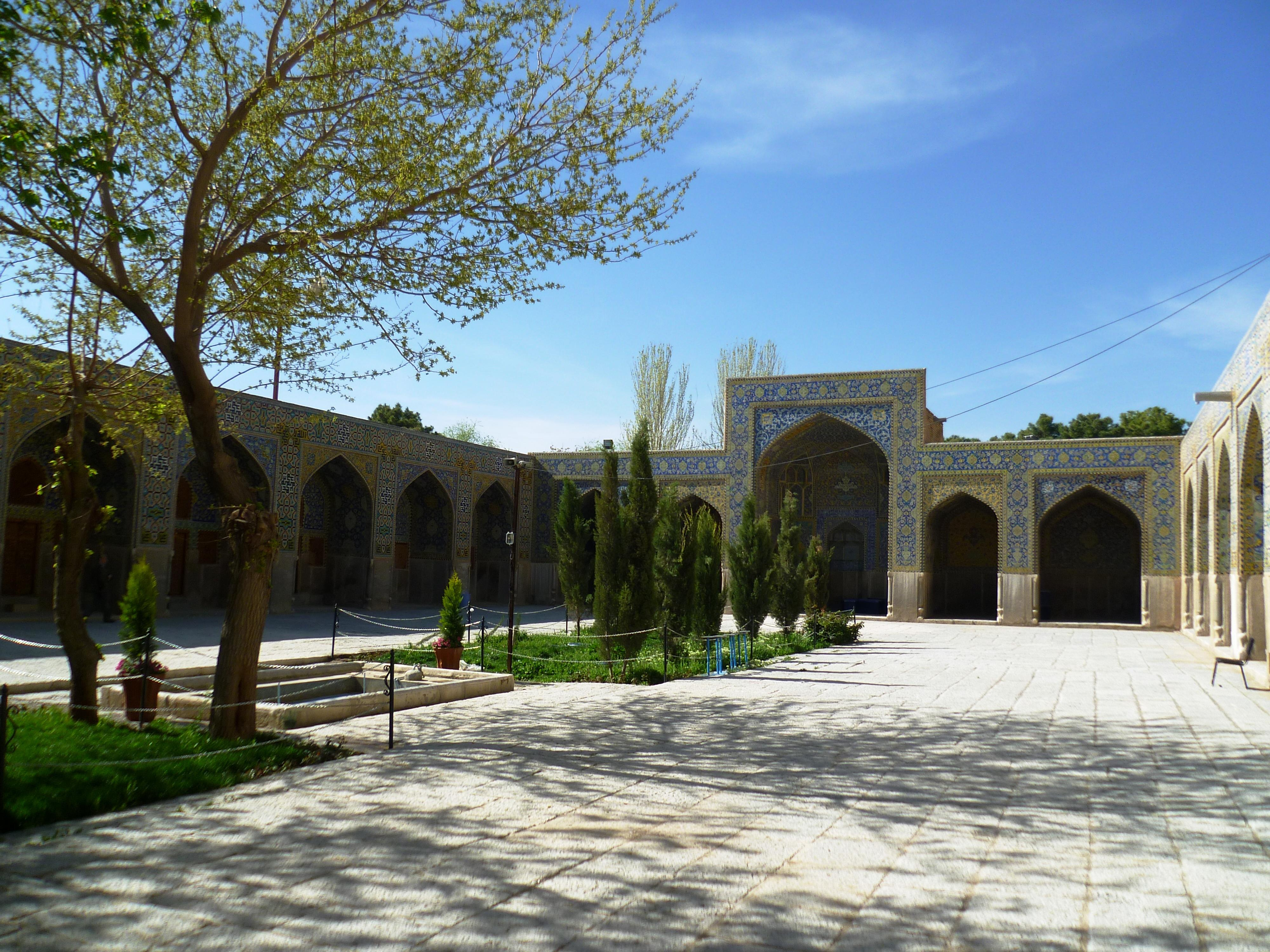
Madrasa of Shah Mosque, one of the Isfahan Seminary schools

The Isfahan Seminary (Persian: حوزه علمیه اصفهان) is one of the oldest seminaries in Isfahan, Iran. Currently, more than 40 schools in Isfahan province are under the supervision of the Management Center of Isfahan Seminary and the leadership of the supreme authority of Grand Ayatollah Hossein Mazaheri.

== History ==
Isfahan Seminary has gone through four periods from the beginning until now. The first period is in the time of Buyid dynasty, in which great figures such as Avicenna and Al-Biruni taught in this seminary. The second period is in the Seljuk dynasty, in which the schools of this seminary expanded a lot. The third period is in the Safavid dynasty, which due to the transfer of the capital to Isfahan and the special attention of the Safavid kings, this seminary reached its peak of prosperity. The fourth period is from the end of the Safavid era to the present era.

=== Overview of Isfahan ===
The conquest of Isfahan took place in 643 CE (23 AH) during the caliphate of Omar and its rulers were appointed by the caliphs for up to three hundred years. Therefore, this city was the capital during the time of Buyid dynasty and the Seljuk Empire. During the Seljuk era, it developed rapidly and became one of the most important cities in Iran. Describing Isfahan in the second half of the fourth century AH and referring to silk textiles and its cotton, saffron and various fruits that were exported to other places, Ibn Hawqal says: From Iraq to Khorasan, there was no larger commercial city than Isfahan, except Ray. This situation continued to grow until the invasion of Timur caused the destruction and collapse of a number of cities and towns in Iran. In Isfahan, he ordered the erection of minarets over the heads of 70,000 victims. In 1591 CE (1000 AH), the Safavid capital was moved from Qazvin to Isfahan, and Isfahan once again became one of the most prosperous cities in Iran. In addition to being a socio-political center, it was also a cultural-scientific center and had a large seminary with high-ranking scholars in the Shiite world.

=== Establishment period ===
According to what has been narrated in history, the first period of the Isfahan Seminary dates back to the reign of Buyid dynasty. When Muhammad ibn Rustam Dushmanziyar was the ruler of Isfahan, Avicenna went to him. While serving in the time of Muhammad ibn Rustam Dushmanziyar in Isfahan, Avicenna also taught despite his ministerial duties. Isfahan school is a relic of that period.

=== Period of turmoil ===
This period coincides with the Seljuk era. In this era, Nizam al-Mulk proposed the movement of building schools and religious-political competitions, so the history of the Shiite seminary is not very clear. Although Hossein Soltanzadeh the author of the History of Iranian schools has mentioned six schools in this era, it is doubtful that they are Shiites. It can be said that Iran has been in political and cultural turmoil since the second half of the fifth century AH, from the Mongol invasion (1219–1221 CE) to the time of Ghazan Khan, one of the Ilkhanate kings (1295–1304 CE). Until he came to power and converted from Buddhism to Islam and change his name to Mahmoud and disobeyed the great Mongol empire based in China. To improve the situation in the country, Ghazan Khan enacted a series of far-reaching reforms and laws and regulations that produced brilliant results. Following Ghazan Khan, nearly 100,000 Mongols converted to Islam, and his successor, Öljaitü (1304–1316 CE), was nicknamed Muhammad Khodabandeh by the Shiites on the occasion of his conversion to the Shiite religion. Thus, until the fall of the Ilkhanid dynasty of Iran, Islam was the official religion of the Ilkhanate government and its reign was based on Islamic law and customs.

=== Boom period ===
This period is one of the most prosperous periods of the Isfahan Seminary. With the invitation of the scholars and scientists of Jabal Amel to Iran and the centralization of Isfahan in the Safavid era, the seminary of Isfahan reached its peak of prosperity. The opposite point of the prosperity period -when the movement of building schools was begun by Nizam al-Mulk to promote the Shafiʽi school- in the third period of the Isfahan Seminary, the movement of building Shiite religious schools took place and dozens of schools were established in the most remote parts of Iran. But the spread of superstitions and moral corruption and turning to the world and material manifestations, disregard for science and literature provided the causes of Safavid decline. Jabal Amel, which has long been a Shiite Imami University and a center for educating scholars in various Islamic sciences such as hadith and Fiqh, Tafsir, Kalam and ethics, paved the way for the prosperity of Shiite thought with Shah Ismail's tendency to Shiism and the invitation of Shiite jurists. However, the history of Shiism in Iran dates back to the first and second centuries AH (622–816 CE).

=== The period of confrontation with governments ===
The fourth period of Isfahan seminary is equal to the governments of Afsharid dynasty, Zand dynasty, Qajar dynasty and Pahlavi dynasty. During the 19th and early 20th centuries, some "concessions" were given to foreign countries. Economic poverty led to the acceptance of any kind of contract with foreign governments and led to cultural invasion. Among the agreements was the acceptance of the establishment of foreign schools in Iran, which some countries such as Britain, Germany, France and Russia established in Iran. Setare-ye Sobh School was one of the schools that opened in Isfahan in September 1910, while Julfa School used to train students in this city.

=== Safavid period ===
During the Safavid period, due to the severe pressures on the Shiites in the Ottoman Empire, some Shiite scholars of Jabal Amel emigrated to Iran to seize the opportunity of this political opening and to promote the Shiite religion. Shah Tahmasb Safavid (r. 1524–1576) played the most important role in welcoming these immigrant scholars. Some of these scholars played a role in the formation of the Isfahan Seminary. During the reign of Shah Tahmasb, due to the Shah's special care for the Ulama and also his personal belief and commitment to the rules of Sharia, the Shiite scientific fields flourished and gained special influence. After Shah Tahmasb, during the reign of Shah Ismail II (r. 1576–1577) due to the Shah's tendency to Sunni, Shiite scholars were isolated and even the Shah tried to kill them. After Shah Ismail II in the reign of Mohammad Khodabanda (r. 1578–1587) no attention was paid to the seminary. With the establishment of the reign of Shah Abbas I Safavid (r. 1588–1629) and his actions, Shiite scholars gained more influence, so much so that it can be said that the Isfahan Seminary was actually established during his time.

=== Afsharid period ===
Following the capture of Isfahan by Mahmud Afghan and the subsequent rise to power of Nader Shah Afshar (r. 1736–1747) and the insecurity of the city, the Isfahan Seminary lost its former prosperity, forcing a number of scholars to emigrate to other cities.

=== Qajar period ===
During the Qajar period (r. 1789–1925), the chair of teaching jurisprudence and principles in the seminary of Isfahan was prosperous. During this period, most scholars learned their education and levels in this city and migrated to the newly prosperous Hawza Najaf to complete their education. Of course, some of them returned to Isfahan after earning a degree in ijtihad and achieving a high level of education, and began teaching and holding other religious affairs. This commuting caused Isfahan to continue to be a pioneer in educating eminent mujtahids. In the 19th century the Isfahan Seminary underwent a revival under the deanship of Ayatollah Mohammed al-Ashtari.

=== Pahlavi period ===
In fact, from this time on, Isfahan Seminary officially became one of the subordinate seminary of the Hawza Najaf, and the learned professors of Najaf settled in this city and provided its scientific achievements to the students. The Isfahan region has lost its prosperity in Pahlavi dynasty decades, especially following the policies of the first Pahlavi.

=== Current situation ===
In the last one or two decades, Isfahan Seminary has benefited from the scientific achievements of Qom Seminary and its prominent professors are the graduates of this seminary, as well as Hawza Najaf.

== Famous alumni ==
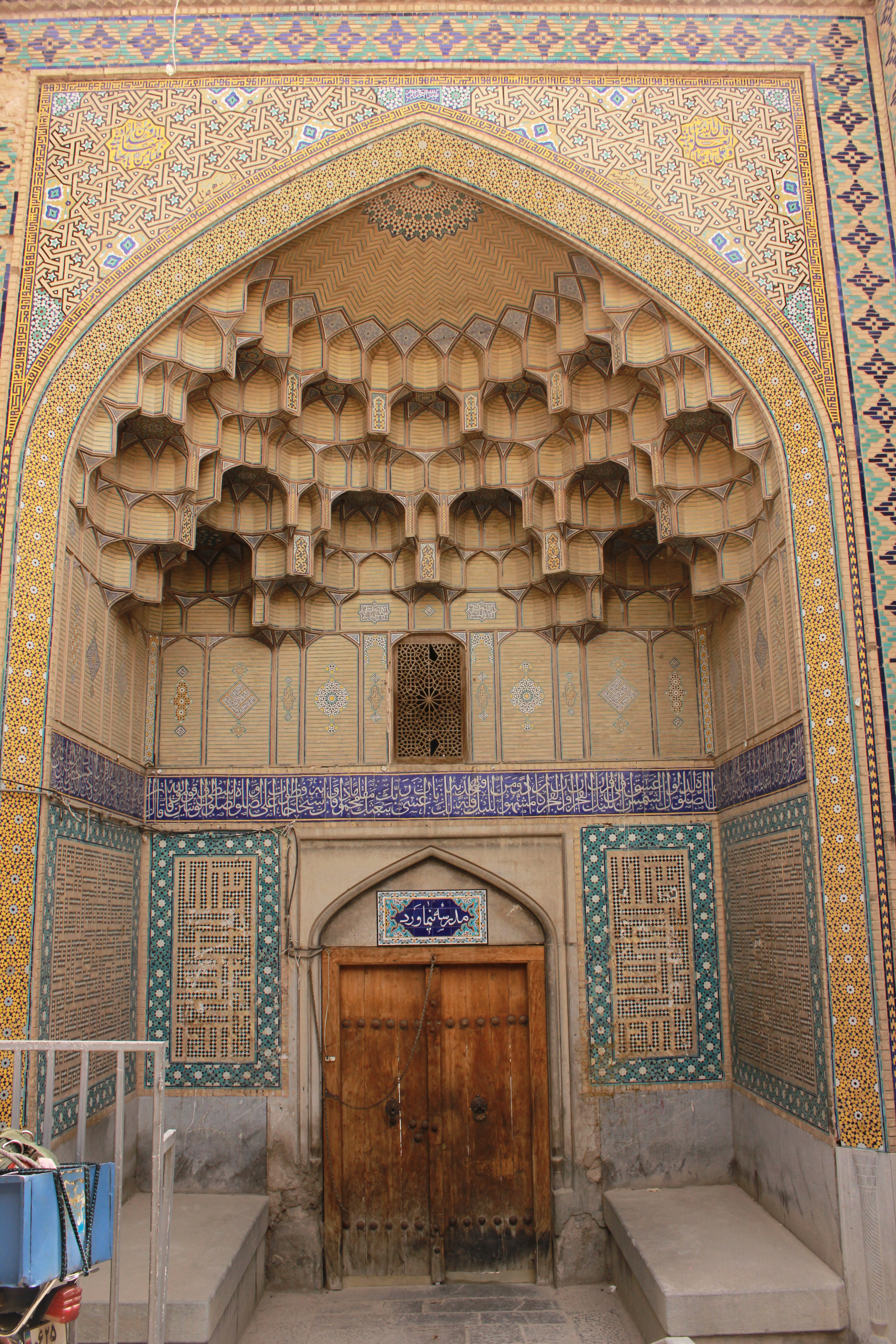
Nim Avard Madrasa, one of the Isfahan Seminary schools

Isfahan Seminary was one of the primary institutions of Safavid Iran, having gone from being the primary institution of the Akhbari school, to later being the progenitor to Sufi revivalism and Irfani Shi'a thought, and today being known as a stronghold of Ilm al-rijal in the Shi'a Islamic world; notable alumni from this period include:

- Mir Damad
- Baha' al-din al-'Amili
- Mohammad Taqi Majlesi
- Mohammad-Baqir Majlesi
- Haydar Amuli
- Nematollah Jazayeri
- Ahmad Bidabadi
- Mohammad Ali Shah Abadi
- Seyyed Hossein Khademi
- Mulla Sadra
- Mohsen Fayz Kashani
- Mirza Shirazi
- Agha Hossein Khansari
- Mohammad Bagher Sabzevari

=== Modern-day Maraji' ===
Some of the most prominent Shi'ite authorities and jurists of today received their Ijazah from Isfahan Seminary to complete their education, these include:

- Hassan Modarres
- Muhammad Hossein Naini
- Abu l-Hasan al-Isfahani
- Abu al-Qasim al-Khoei
- Mohammad-Reza Golpaygani
- Mohammad Reza Masjed Shahi
- Seyyed Jamal al-Din Golpayegani
- Hossein Borujerdi

=== Scientific and jurisprudential personalities ===
A few purely scholastic academics graduated from Isfahan seminary as well, among others these would include:

- Abdollah ibn Mohsen Aeroji
- Rahim Arbab

== Influential masters of the Isfahan Seminary ==
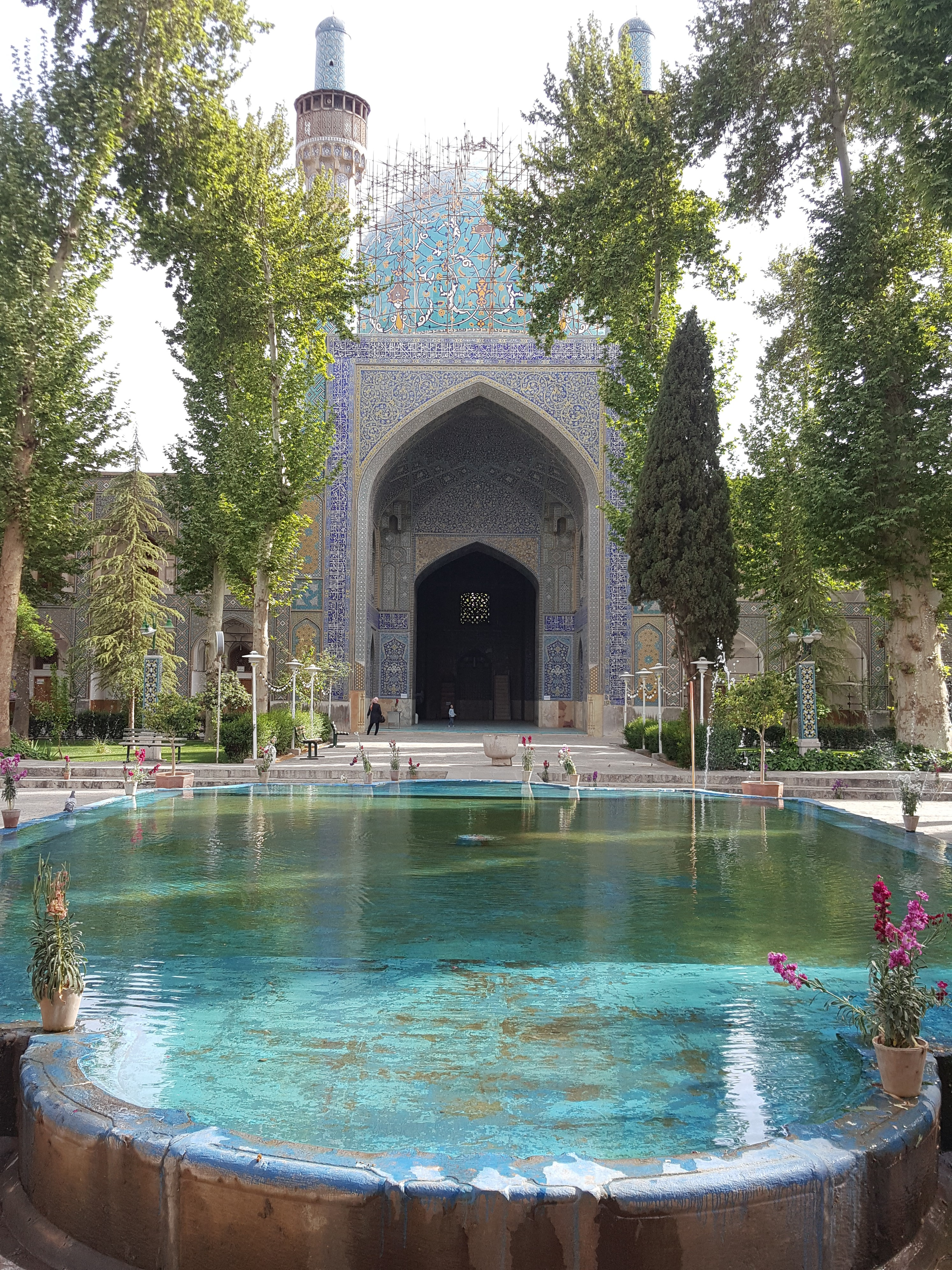
Chaharbagh Madrasa, one of the Isfahan Seminary schools

- Sheikh Ali Menshar, Safavid era
- Hossein ibn Abdol al-Samad Haresi, Safavid era
- Mulla Abdollah Tustari, Safavid era
- Baha' al-din al-'Amili, Safavid era
- Lotfollah ibn Abdolkarim Meisi, Safavid era
- Seyyed Mostafa Tafreshi, Safavid era
- Mohammad Baqer Esterabadi, Safavid era
- Mir Fendereski, Safavid era
- Qasem Hassani Tabatabaei Qahpayi, Safavid era
- Mohammad Taqi Majlesi, Safavid era
- Rajab Ali Tabrizi, Safavid era
- Rafi al-Din Mohammad ibn Heydar Hassani Tabatabaei, Safavid era
- Mulla Hossein Boroujerdi, Safavid era
- Mohammad Salih al-Mazandarani, Safavid era
- Rafi al-Din Gilani, Safavid era
- Mohaqqeq Sabzevari, Safavid era
- Agha Hossein Khansari, Safavid era
- Mohammad ibn Hassan Shervani, Safavid era
- Hossein Mar'ashi Hosseini Ameli, Safavid era
- Khalil ibn Qazi Qazvini, Safavid era
- Qazi Jafar ibn Abdollah Kamareh'ee, 12th century AH
- Seyyed Nematollah Jazayeri, 12th century AH
- Mohsen Fayz Kashani, 12th century AH
- Agha Jamal Khansari, 12th century AH
- Mohammad ibn Abdolfattah Tonekaboni, 12th century AH
- Mohammad Saleh Khatoonabadi, 12th century AH
- Agha Hossein Gilani, 12th century AH
- Mirza Abdollah Afandi Esfahani, 12th century AH
- Abolfazl Bahaoddin Mohammad ibn Hassan Esfahani, 12th century AH
- Hazin Lahiji, 12th century AH
- Mohammad Sadeq Tonekaboni, 12th century AH
- Abdollah ibn Saleh Bohrani Samahiji, 12th century AH
- Mohammad Bagher ibn Hassan Khalifeh Soltani, Nader Shah era
- Mohammad Taghi ibn Mohammad Kazem Almasi Shams Abadi, Nader Shah era
- Mulla Ismail Khajooyi, Nader Shah era
- Mulla Mehrab Gilani, Nader Shah era
- Jafar ibn Hossein Khansari, Nader Shah era
- Mohammad Ibrahim al-Karbasi al-Ashtari, Qajar era
- Mulla Ali ibn Mulla Jamshid Noori, Qajar era
- Mohammad Taghi ibn Mohammad Rahim Esfahani, Qajar era
- Agha Noorollah Esfahani, Pahlavi era
- Hossein Mazaheri, recent era
- Mohammad Ali Naseri, recent era

== Courses ==
Most Islamic sciences are taught periodically and at very high levels in the schools of Isfahan Seminary, the most important of which are the following:

- Fiqh and Principles of Islamic jurisprudence
- Hadith studies
- Philosophy and Rational Sciences
- Traditional medicine and Astronomy
- Mathematics

== Schools ==
One of the characteristics of the Isfahan Seminary, especially in the Safavid period, was the prosperity of school construction in Isfahan. Most of these schools were built by rulers and their allies. Some of those existing schools and some have gradually disappeared:

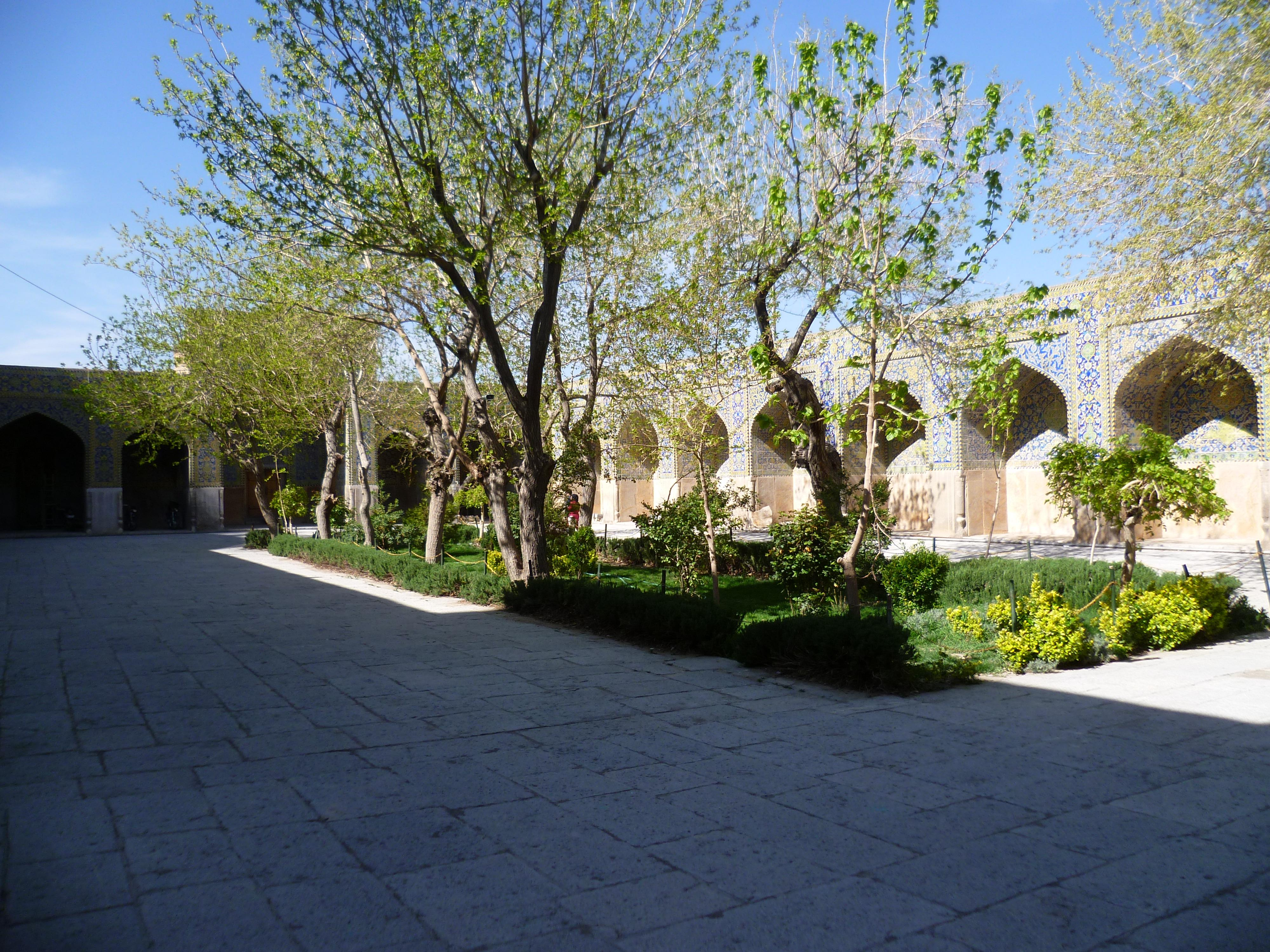
Madrasa of Shah Mosque, one of the Isfahan Seminary schools

- Emamzadeh Ismail school, Safavid era
- Jalalieh or Ahmad Abad school, Safavid era
- Almasieh school, Safavid era
- Seqa al-Islam school, Safavid era
- Shafieeyeh school, Safavid era
- Sheikh al-Islam school, Safavid era
- Mulla Abdollah school, Safavid era
- Nim Avard school, Safavid era
- Mayam Beygom school, Safavid era
- Shahzadeha school, Safavid era
- Jadeh Bozorg va Jadeh Koochak school, Safavid era
- Fatemieh school, Safavid era
- Kalbasi or Qoroq Chai beyk school, Safavid era
- Mirza Taqi school, Safavid era
- Mobarakieh school, Safavid era
- Khajeh Malek Mostowfi school, Safavid era
- Ismaeelieh school, Safavid era
- Dar al-Elm school, Safavid era
- Shah or Masjed Jame Abbasi school, Safavid era
- Sheikh Bahayi school, Safavid era
- Mirza Abdollah Afandi school, Safavid era

Although the importance of the Isfahan Seminary has diminished in the last century with the establishment of the Qom Seminary, the seminaries in this city are still standing and students are learning science. Some religious schools that have been established in Isfahan in recent years or have remained from the past and are now open, including:

- Chaharbagh school, recent era
- Seyyed school, recent era
- Sadr school, recent era
- Sadr Chaharbagh Khajoo school, recent era
- Araban school, recent era
- Kaseh Geran school, recent era
- Naseri school, recent era
- Noorieh school, recent era
- Maryam Beygom school, recent era
- Al-Ghadir school, recent era

== See also ==
- Hawza
- Qom Seminary
- Hawza Najaf
- Sadr Madrasa
- Isfahan National Holy Association
- Sheikhan cemetery
