= Ya'qūb Māydashtī =

19th century Kurdish poet

Sayyid Ya'qūb Māydashtī (1799–1871) was a Kurdish poet from Kermanshah and considered one of the greatest from the Kermanshah area. Subjects of his included love, religion, mysticism, satire and the popular genre of enigma and answering them.

== Biography ==
Māydashtī was born in Qomsheh village in Kermanshah, Iran and was a Shia Muslim. He spoke Kurdish, Gorani and Persian and worked as a dewan in Kermanshah under the service of governor Imam Quli Mirza Imad al-Dawla of the Qajar dynasty. During this period, his reputation was as high as that of Persian poets and scholars. In Kermanshah, he moreover composed formal letters for the governor. Beside poetry, he was well-versed in grammar, philosophy, music and astronomy.

Before his death in Qomsheh in 1871, he travelled to Qom to visit the Fatima Masumeh Shrine and also to Tehran.

After his death, the same symbol which was put over the graves of Kurdish kings, religious leaders and other eminent people was erected over the grave of Maydashti.

== Poetry ==
Māydashtī consciously wrote in different Kurdish dialects and he was influenced by his contemporary Nalî. His diwan include words in Laki, Sorani and Kalhori and use their idioms for the purpose of giving them new expressions. Beside being influenced by other Kurdish poets, he was also influenced by Persian literature. According to Dehqan, his diwan had a hard diction and sometimes idiosyncratic making the text difficult to read.

== Works ==
Important works of Māydashtī:

- Dirîj ö Taren Imşu (Long and Dark is Tonight)
- Çarenûs (The Predestinator)
- Wext-i Çepawe (The Time of Jubilation It Is)
- Dur-i Pendit (The Pearl of Your Advice)
- Xawîran Xalit (Your Disturbing Spot)
- Çûn 'Umr-i Min (As My Life)
- Dilber Tu Nepirsî (Charmer! You Do Not Ask!)
- Mewla Parestan (Master Worshippers)
- Şîrîn Tewr Takî (Of A Nice Figure You Are)
- Tu Ta Kiy Ne Fikr Sewday Xamenî (Until What Time You Are Thinking About The Vain Imagination?)
- Zahid Heramen (Ascetic! It is Prohibited)
- Çiraxim Daxî (My Lamp Burned)
- Hamseran Tew Bî (Companions! It Is The End)
- Şîrîn Exzerî (Vivacious You Are!)
- Hûşîm Medhûşem (My Intelligence Is Confused)
