= Qomsheh-ye Lor Zanganeh =

Qomsheh-ye Lor Zanganeh قمشه لرزنگنه
- Village
- Location within Iran
- Coordinates: 34°18′41″N 46°50′09″E
- Country: Iran
- Province: Kermanshah
- County: Kermanshah
- Bakhsh: Mahidasht
- Rural District: Mahidasht

Population (2006)
  - Total: 258
- Time zone: UTC+3:30 (IRST)
  - Summer (DST): UTC+4:30 (IRDT)

Qomsheh-ye Lor Zanganeh (Persian: قمشه لرزنگنه, also Romanized as Qomsheh-ye Lor Zanganeh; also known as Lūr-i-Zengeneh) is a village in Mahidasht Rural District, Mahidasht District, Kermanshah County, Kermanshah Province, Iran. At the 2006 census, its population was 258, in 58 families.

== Notable people ==
- Yaqub Maydashti
