= Fatima Masumeh Shrine =

Iranian national heritage site

- حرم فاطمه معصومه
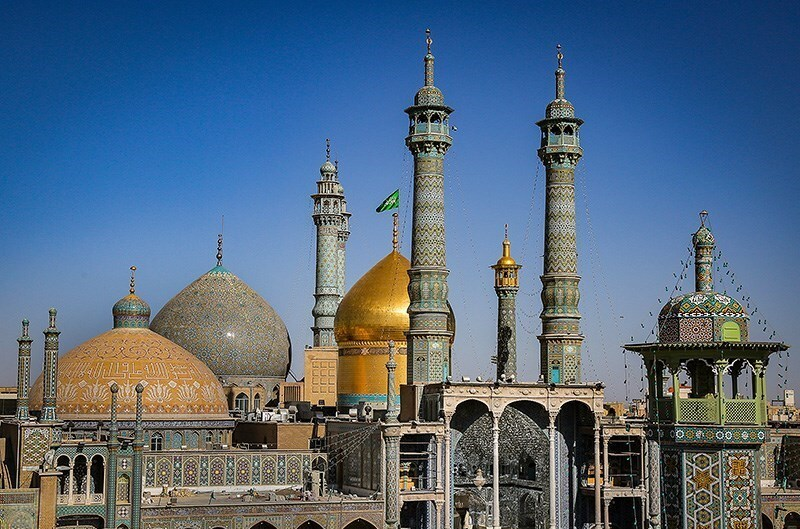
- The shrine in 2021

- Location of the shrine in Iran

Religion
- Affiliation: Islam
- Branch/tradition: Shia (Twelver)
- Ecclesiastical or organisational status: Shrine
- Status: Active

Location
- Location: Qom, Qom province
- Country: Iran
- Interactive map of Fatima Masumeh Shrine
- Coordinates: 34°38′30″N 50°52′44″E

Architecture
- Type: Mosque architecture
- Style: Iranian
- Completed: From 9th century CE; To 19th century CE

Specifications
- Dome: Three
- Minaret: Six
- Site area: 38,000 m^{2} (410,000 sq ft)

Website
- amfm.ir

Iran National Heritage List
- Official name: Fatima Masumeh Shrine
- Type: Shrine
- Designated: 1932
- Reference no.: 128
- Conservation organization: Cultural Heritage, Handicrafts and Tourism Organization of Iran

The Fatima Masumeh Shrine (Persian: حرم فاطمه معصومه) is the mausoleum of Fatima bint Musa, located in Qom, Iran. Qom is considered a holy city in Shia Islam along with Najaf, Karbala, Mashhad, Kadhimiya, Samarra and Kufa. The city is the world's largest center for Shia Islamic scholarship. Fatima bint Musa was a descendant of the Islamic prophet Muhammad, the granddaughter of Ja'far al-Sadiq, the daughter of Musa al-Kazim, the sister of Ali al-Rida, and the aunt of Muhammad al-Jawad, the sixth, seventh, eighth and ninth of the Twelve Imams.

In Shia Islam, women are often revered as saints if they are close relatives to even one of the Twelve Imams. Having close connections to four of the Imams, Fatima Masumeh is therefore honored as a saint, and her shrine is considered one of the most significant shrines in Shia Islam. Every year, millions of Shia Muslims travel to Qom to honor Fatima Masumeh and seek her intercession with God. Also buried within the shrine are three daughters of the ninth Imam Muhammad al-Taqi, Persian poet Parvin Etesami, six members of the Safavid dynasty, eleven members of the Qajar dynasty, and many other notable political figures, scholars, and clerics. The shrine has attracted dozens of seminaries and religious schools.

== Specifications ==
The shrine consists of a burial chamber, three courtyards and three large prayer halls, totalling an area of 38,000 m^{2} (410,000 sq ft). The three prayer halls are named: Tabātabā'ī, Bālā Sar, and A‘dham.

== Pilgrimage ==
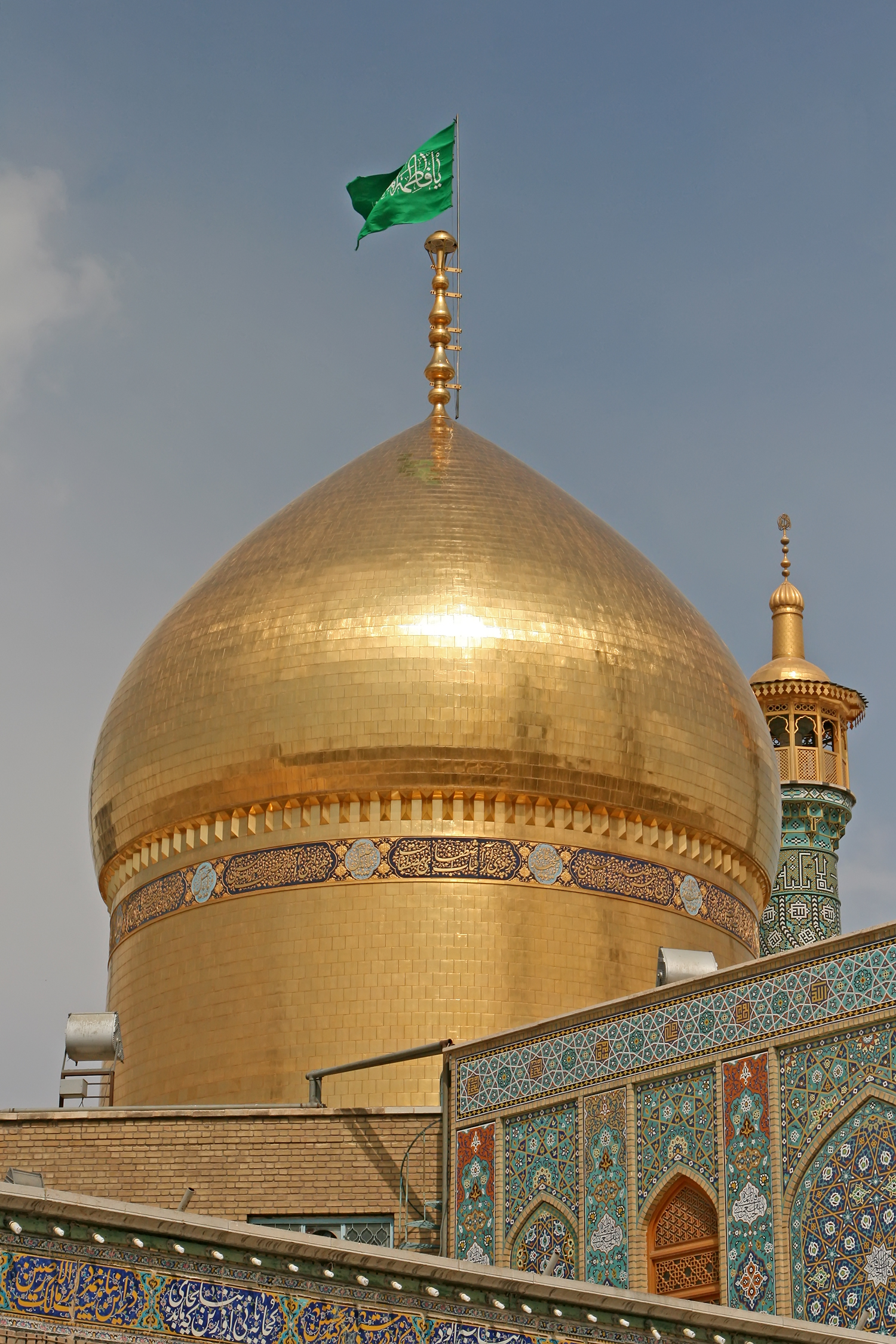
The golden dome above the mausoleum

Decorative muqarnas vaulting in the iwan entrance of the shrine, Atabki courtyard.

Though Shia theology formally states that the relatives of the Imams, or Imamzadehs, hold a lower status than the Imams, popular Shi'ism still strongly venerates imamzadehs. In Iran, there are many more burial places of the Imams' relatives than there are for the Imams themselves. Imamzadehs are considered to be close to God and religiously pious because of their close relation to Imams. Shia Muslims commonly travel on pilgrimages to shrines of imamzadehs, such as the Shrine of Fatima Masumeh. Men and women seek cures to ailments, solutions to problems, and forgiveness of sins at these sites. Many hadiths, or teachings, are recorded from Shia Imams praising the veneration of Fatima Masumeh, and proclaiming that those who make a pilgrimage to her Shrine will "certainly be admitted to heaven."

Fatima Masumeh's Shrine is crowded every day of the year with Shia men, women, and children from all around the world. Some stay for hours or days praying at the shrine and circumambulating her tomb. The economy of Qom has become reliant on this pilgrimage for the tourism it brings. In turn, Qom has remained conservative and traditional to maintain a pious environment for pilgrims. Many miracles have been recorded as taking place at this shrine, and they are documented in a special office within the shrine complex. Some are published in the shrines monthly newspaper, the Payam-e Astan.

Pilgrims at the Fatima Masumeh Shrine follow rituals that have been passed down for centuries. Imam Reza, Fatimah's brother, outlined these ritual acts as he described the way he visited her shrine. The prayer Imam Reza dictated to his sister continues to be part of the pilgrimage. Since the Safavid Empire, additional rituals have been added that are now typical for many pilgrimages include ritual washing beforehand, dressing in perfumed clothing, and entering the site with one's right foot.

== History ==
=== Early ===
Since the beginning of Qom's history in the 7th century, the city has been associated with Shia Islam and set apart from the Sunni caliphate. Many Shia hadiths referred to Qom as a "place of refuge for believers," calling it a deeply religious place. After Fatima Masumeh's death in Qom and the construction of her Shrine, scholars moved to Qom and the city gained its reputation for religious learning. Today, Qom is still noted for its religious seminaries and organizations.

Fatima Masumeh died in Qom in 201 AH (816/817 CE) as she travelled to join her brother, Imam Reza in Khorasan. The caravan she travelled in was attacked in the then-Sunni town of Saveh by Abbasid agents, and 23 of Fatima Masumeh's family and friends were killed (Jaffer). Fatima Masumeh was then reportedly poisoned by a woman from the enemies, fell ill, and asked to be taken to nearby Shia town of Qom, where she died. Fatima Masumeh's host in Qom buried her in his plot of land.

The style of Fatima Masumeh's Shrine has developed over many centuries. At first, her tomb was covered with a bamboo canopy. Fifty years later, this was replaced by a more durable domed building, at the request of the daughter of Imam Muhammad al-Taqi, Sayyida Zaynab. The family of Sayyida Zainab later added a further two domes to the Shrine.

=== Safavid era ===
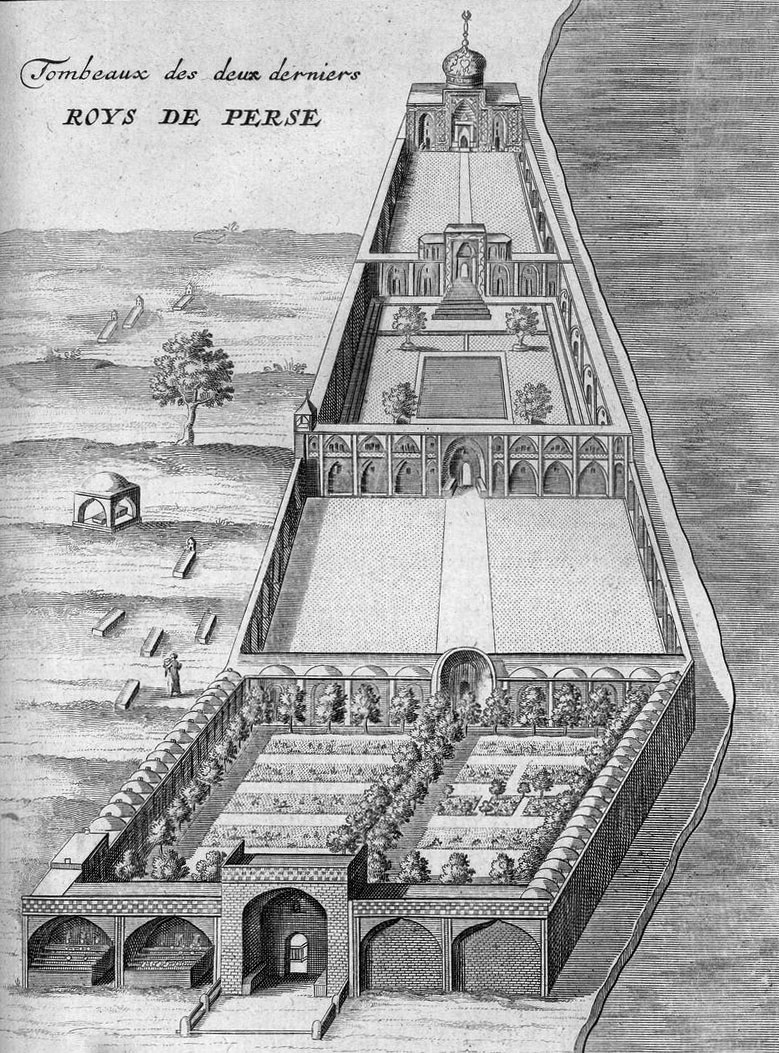
The shrine in the Safavid Em[ire, by Jean Chardin, 1736

In 1519, Tajlu Khanum, the wife of Shah Ismail I, led a project to improve the drainage around the Shrine, embellish the Shrine with an iwan and two minarets, and reconstruct the tomb chamber as a domed octagon. At times of war, Safavid royal women found refuge in Qom, and likely compared their situation to that of Fatima Masumeh. These women donated beautiful fabrics and other items to the Shrine. Abbas the Great did not patronize the Shrine of Fatima Masumeh as much as he did other shrines of Imams, but he did offer books to the Shrine's seminary library.

=== Modern ===
From 1795–1796, Fath-Ali Shah Qajar converted two Safavid sahn or courtyards into one large courtyard and, in 1803, fixed the golden dome. In 1883, Agha Ebrahim Amin al-Soltan and, after his death, his son Ali Asghar Amin al-Soltan added the Sahn-e Jadid or "New Court" to the Shrine complex. During Ayatollah Khomeini's 1979 Iranian Revolution, Qom was named "the birthplace" of this movement. Khomeini studied in Qom and lived there at the beginning and end of the Revolution. Aspects of Qom's culture, including the Shrine of Fatima Masumeh, were used to unite the Iranian people over significant historical and mythical events. Khomeini used images of the Shrine of Fatima Masumeh in posters, money, and stamps created during the Revolution. Khomeini also constructed an addition to the Shrine of Fatima Masumeh and added more space for pilgrims. In addition, the Mausoleum of Ruhollah Khomeini utilizes architectural elements that are similar to Fatima Masumeh's Shrine, such as the golden dome.

== Gallery ==
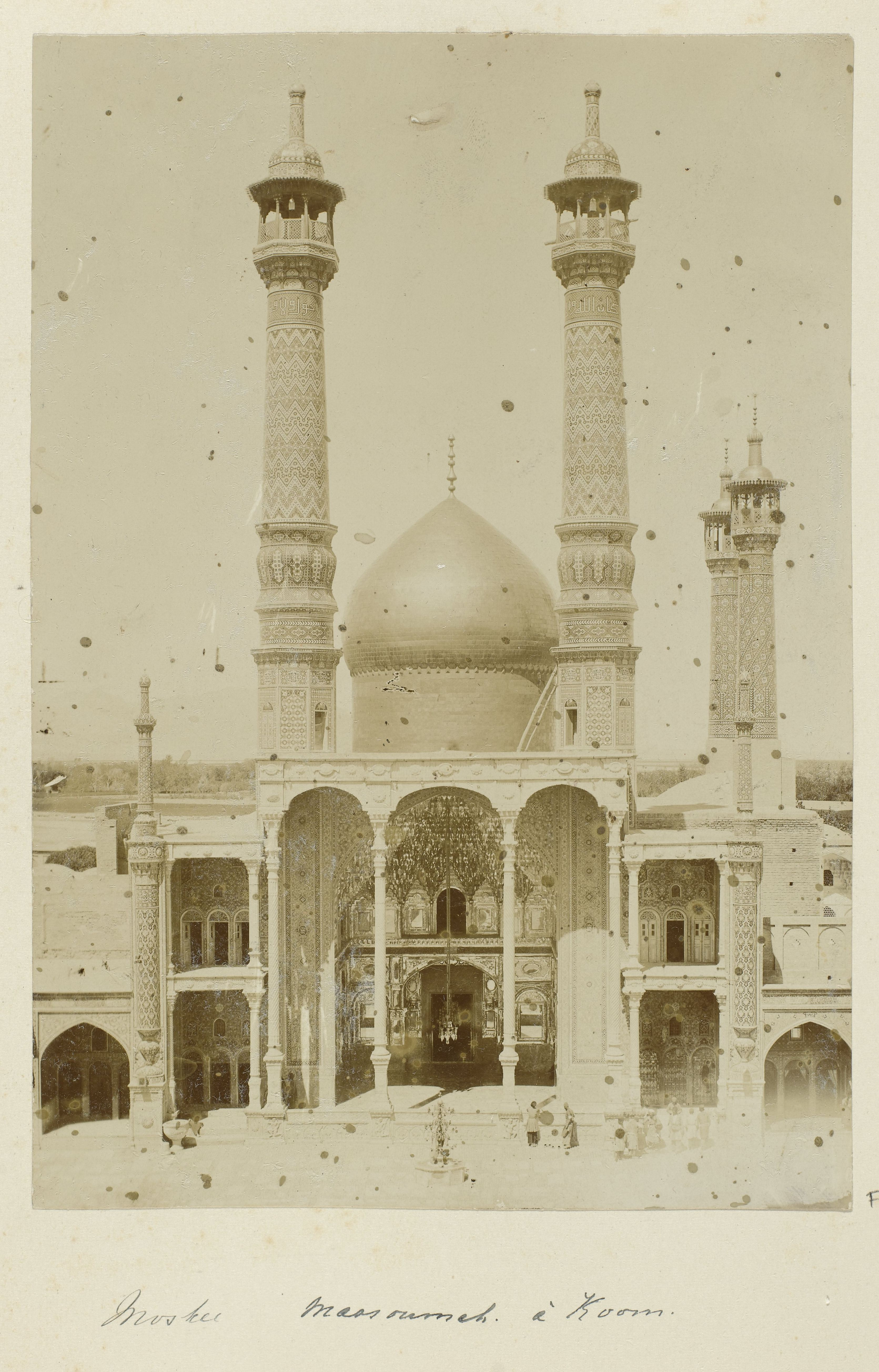
Historical photograph by Antoin Sevruguin, 1880–1895

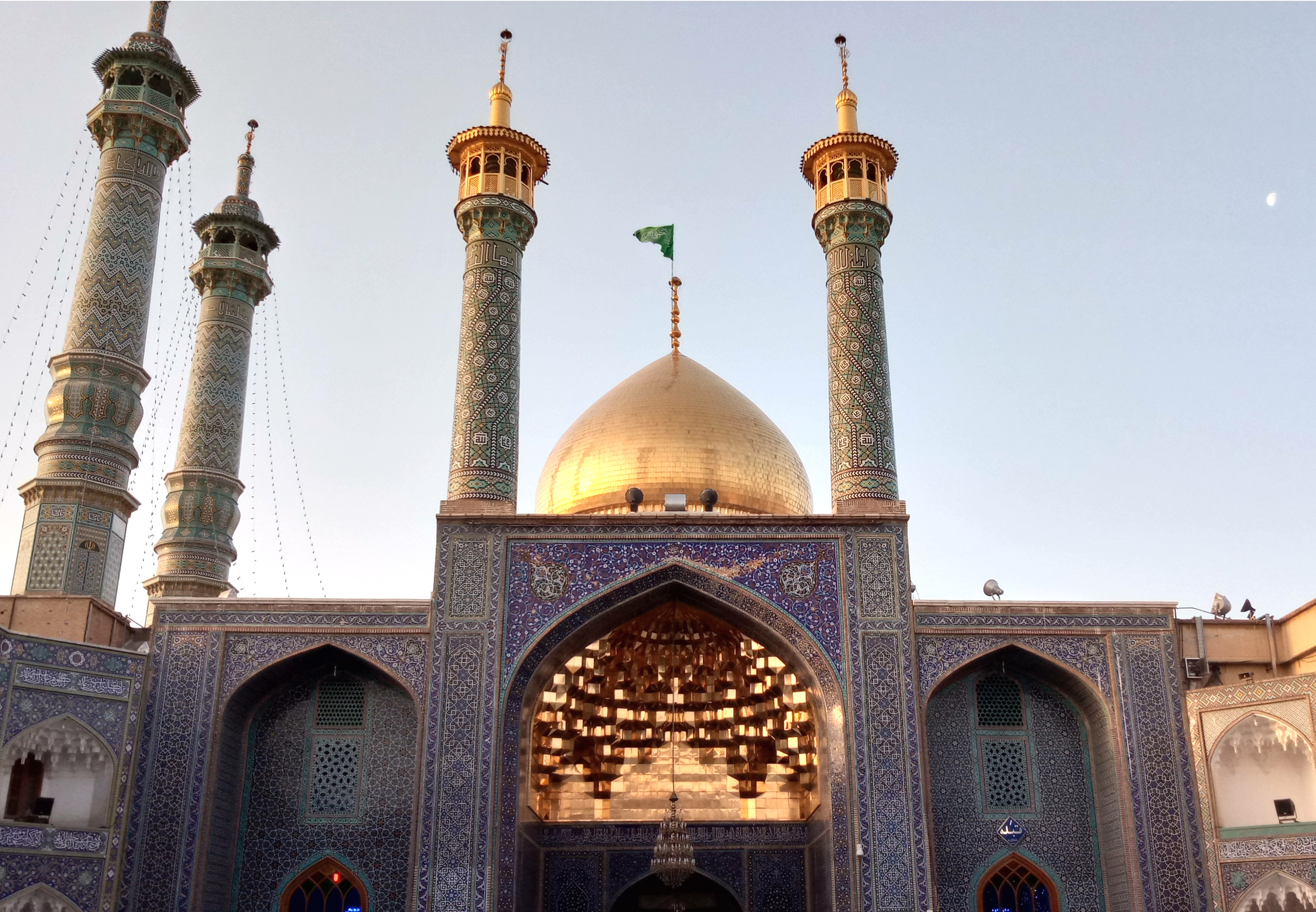
The Golden Iwan and Golden Dome, commissioned ca. 1519 by Tajlu Khanum, wife of Shah Ismail.

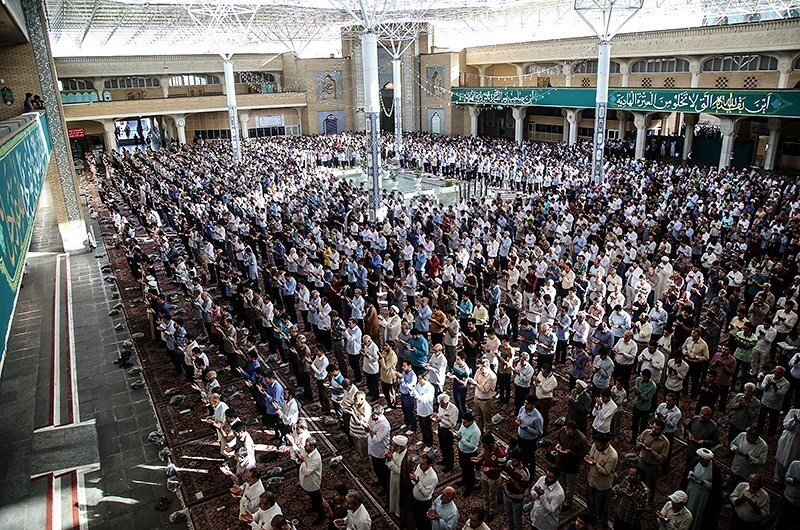
Eid al-Fitr prayer at the shrine in 2017

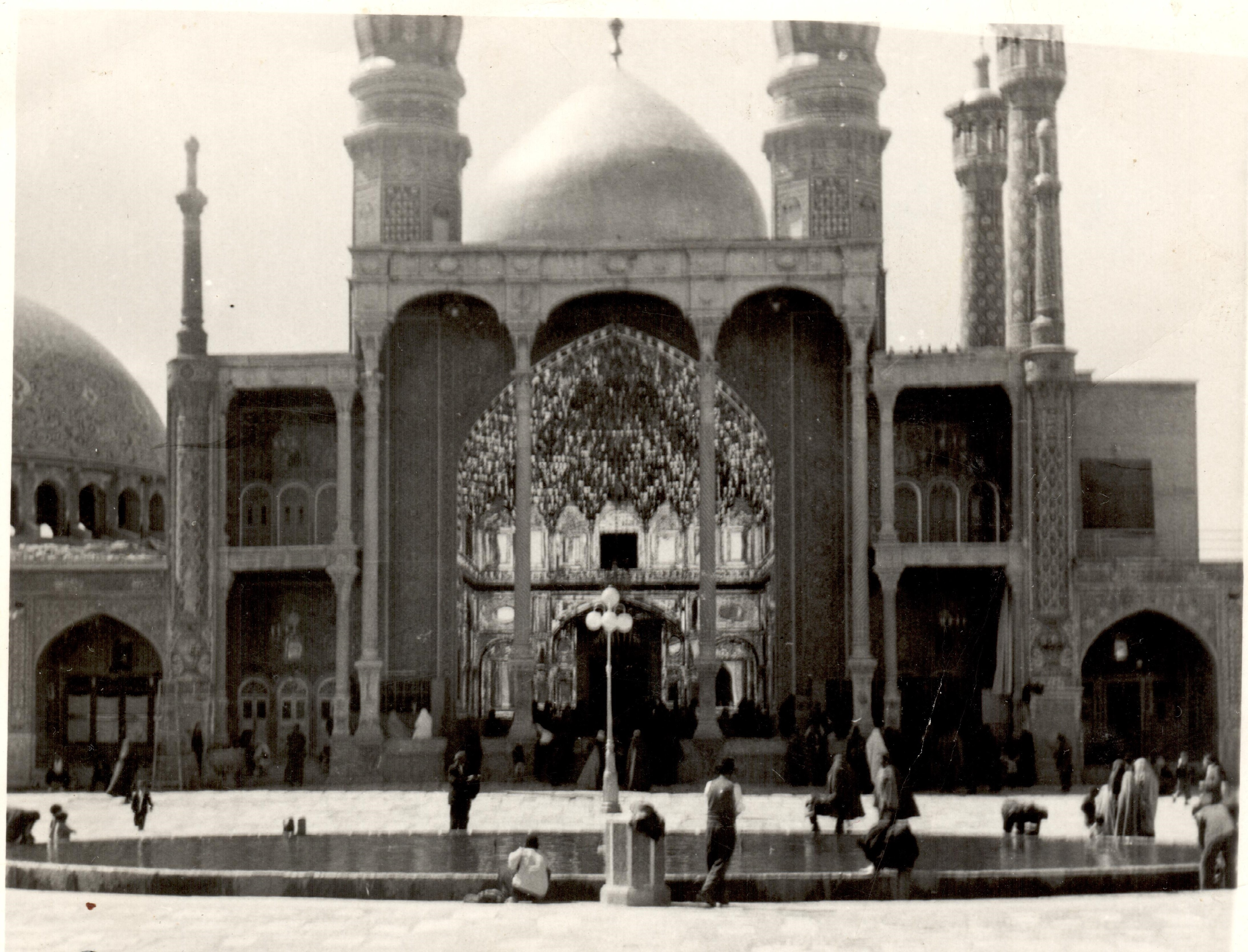
The shrine in 1955

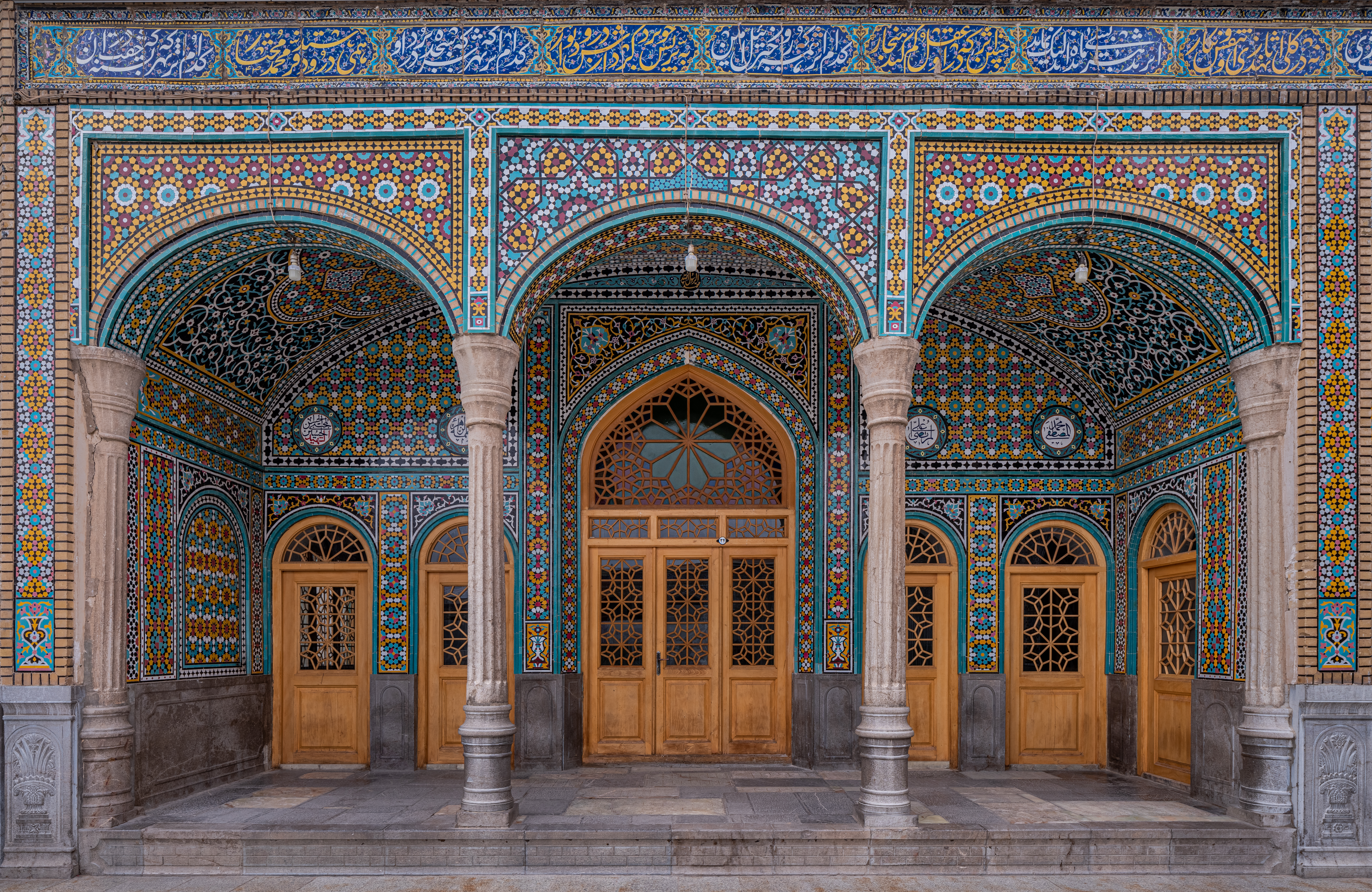

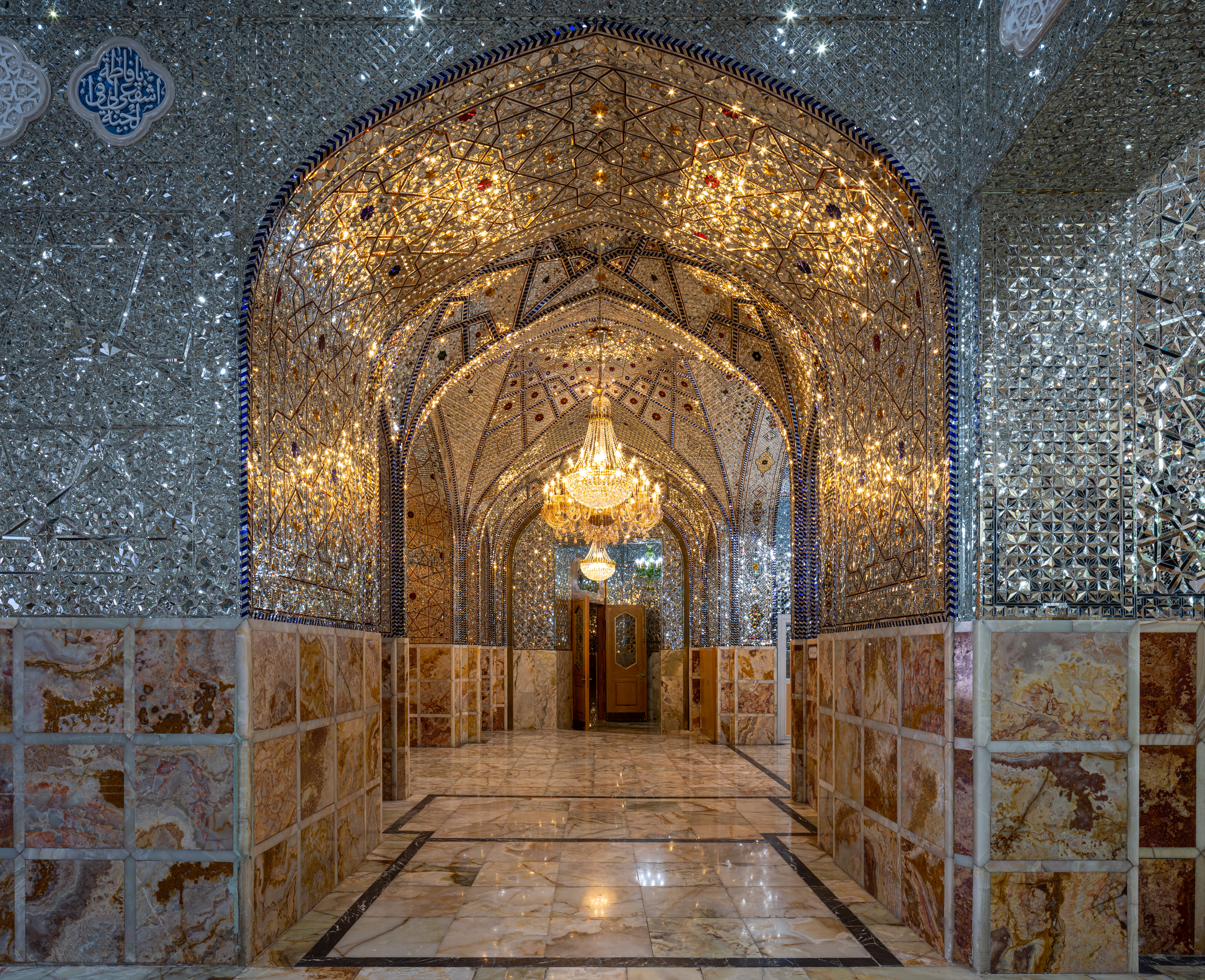
Ayeneh-kari inside the shrine

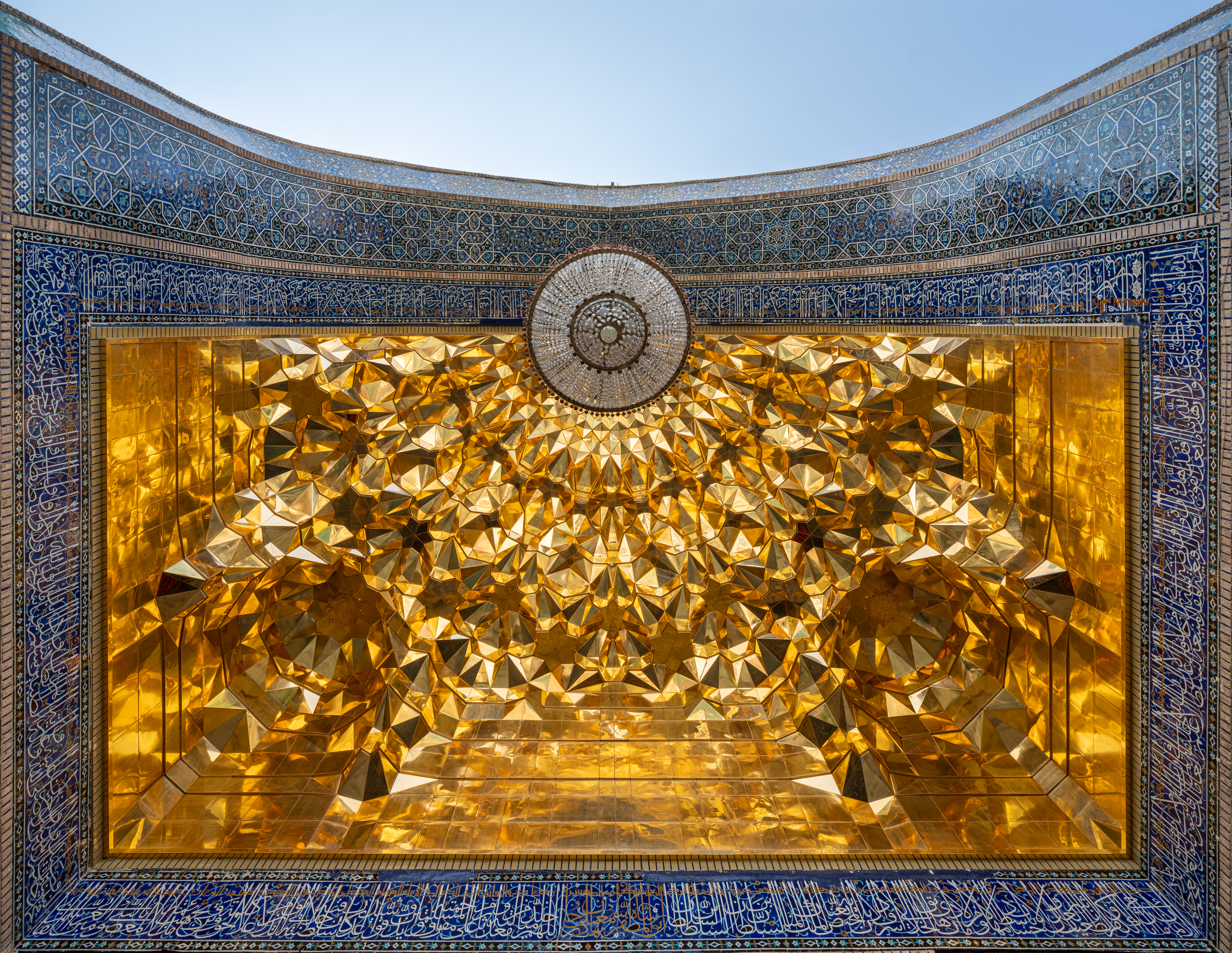

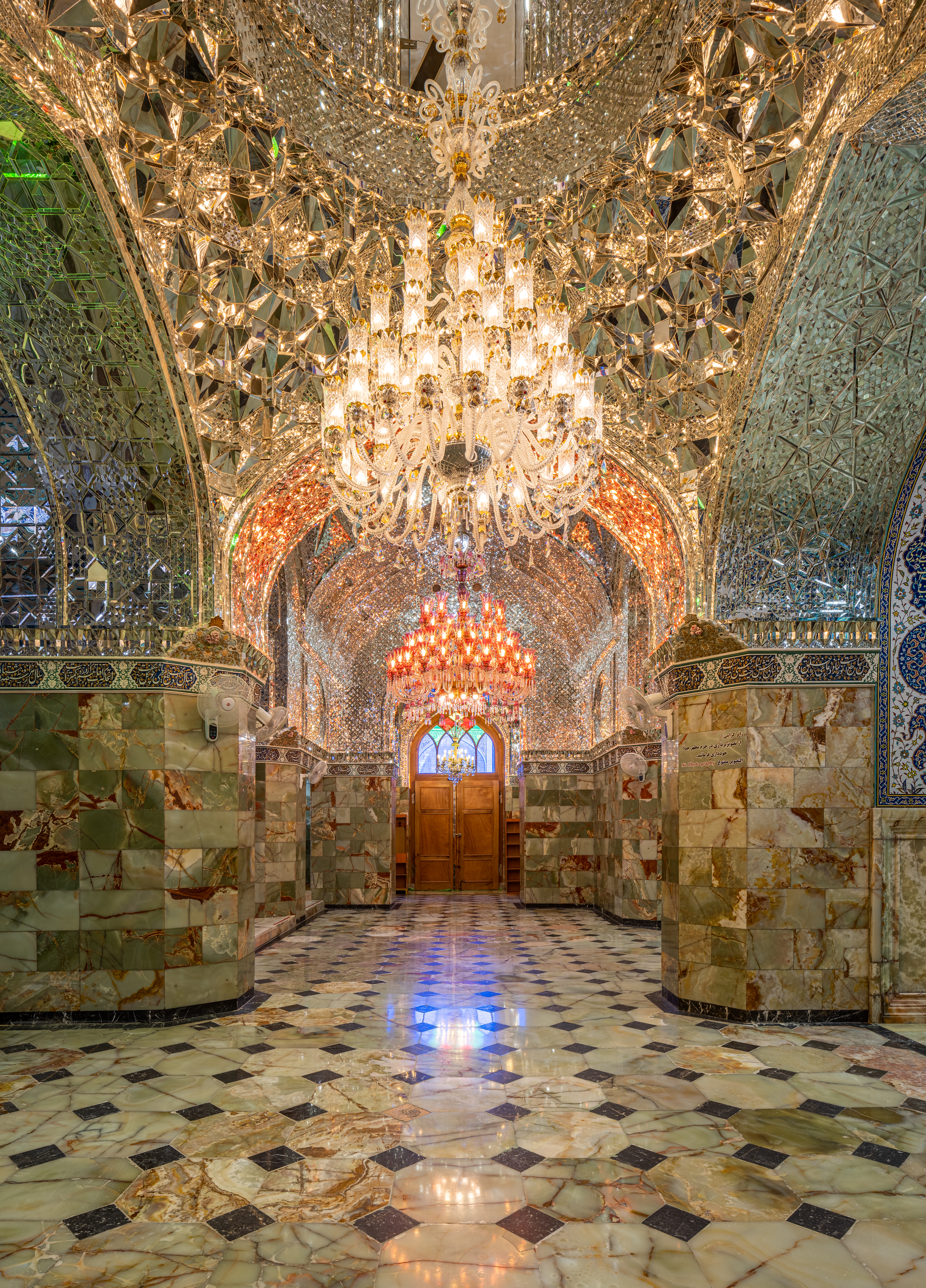

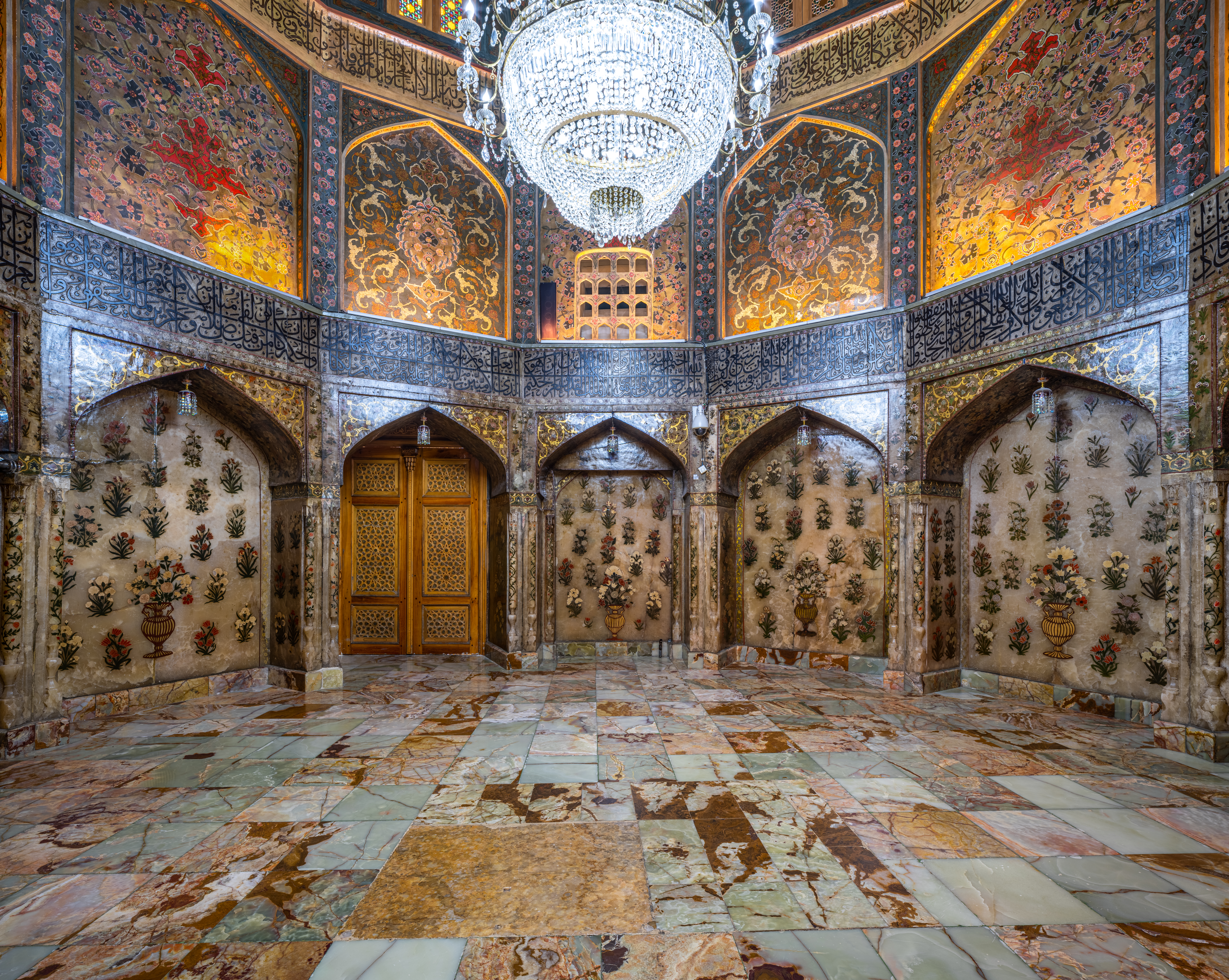

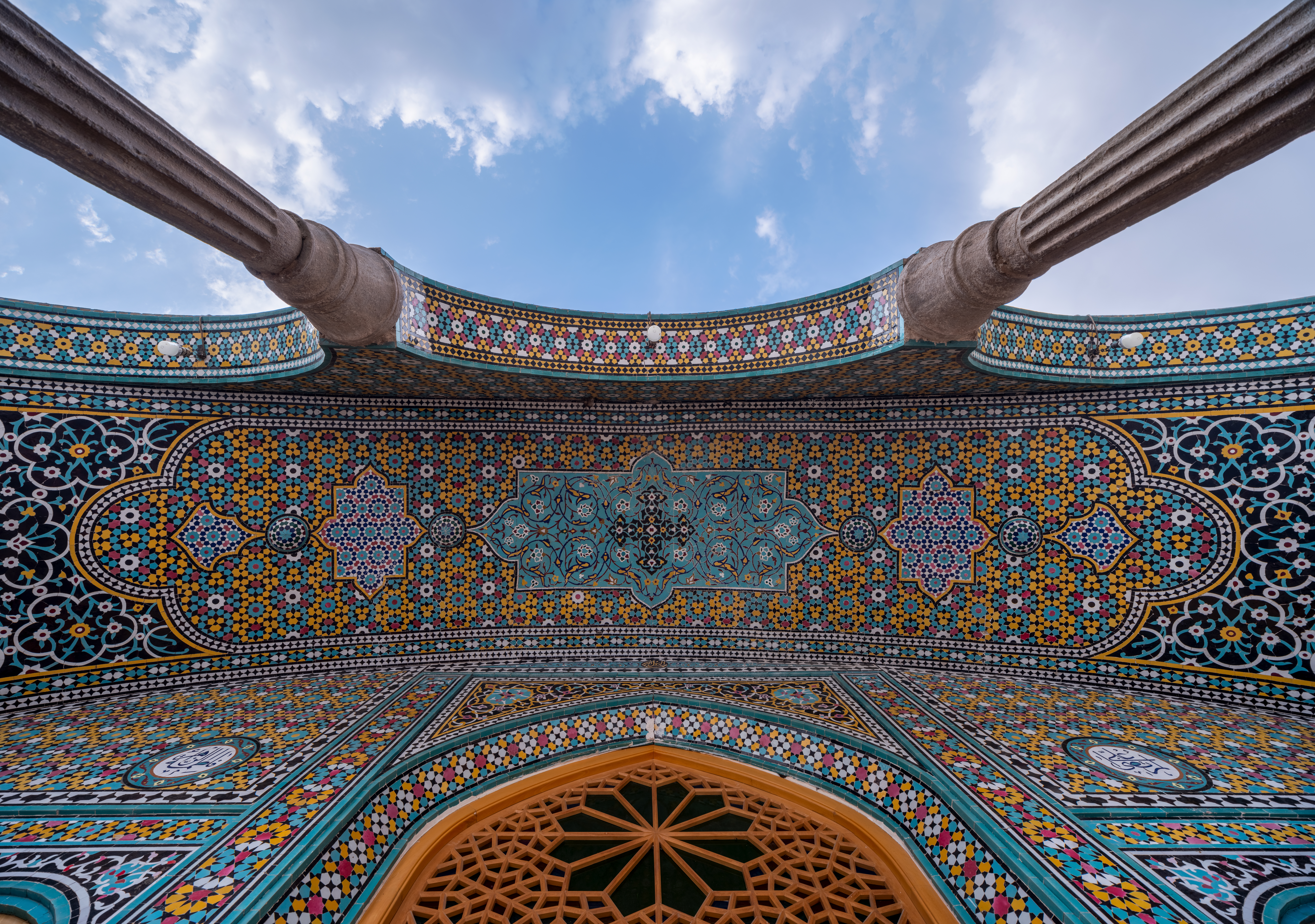

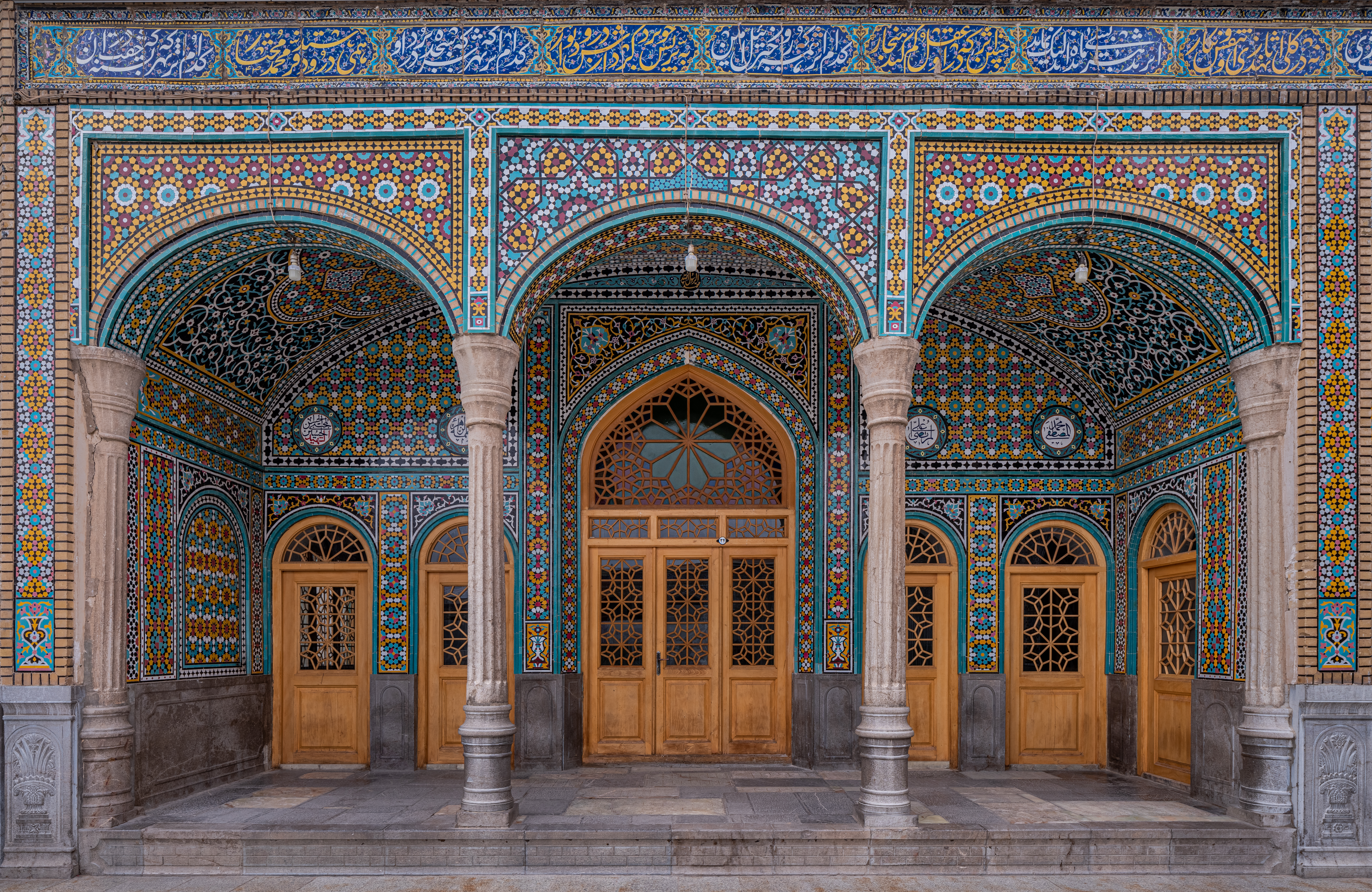

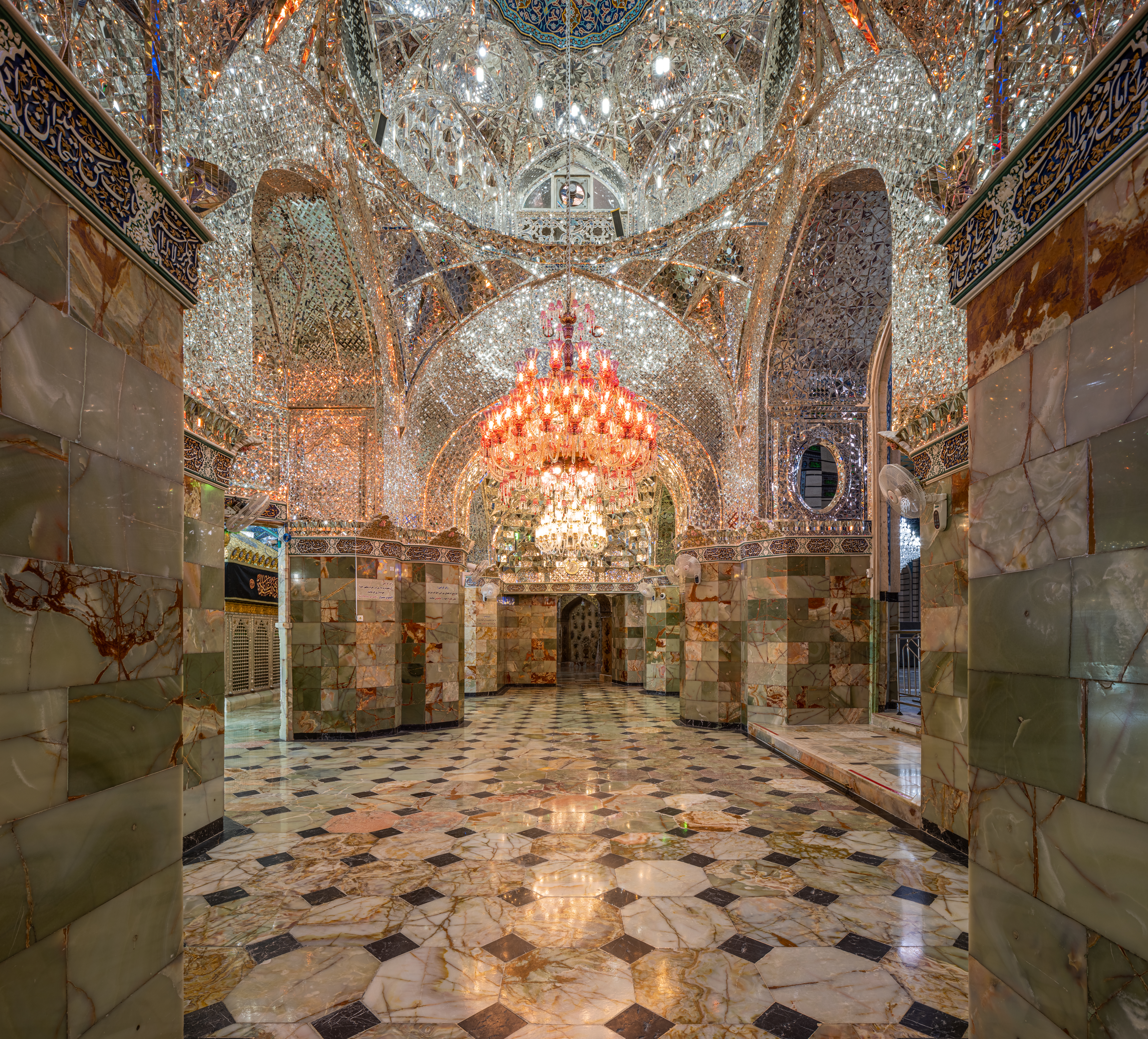

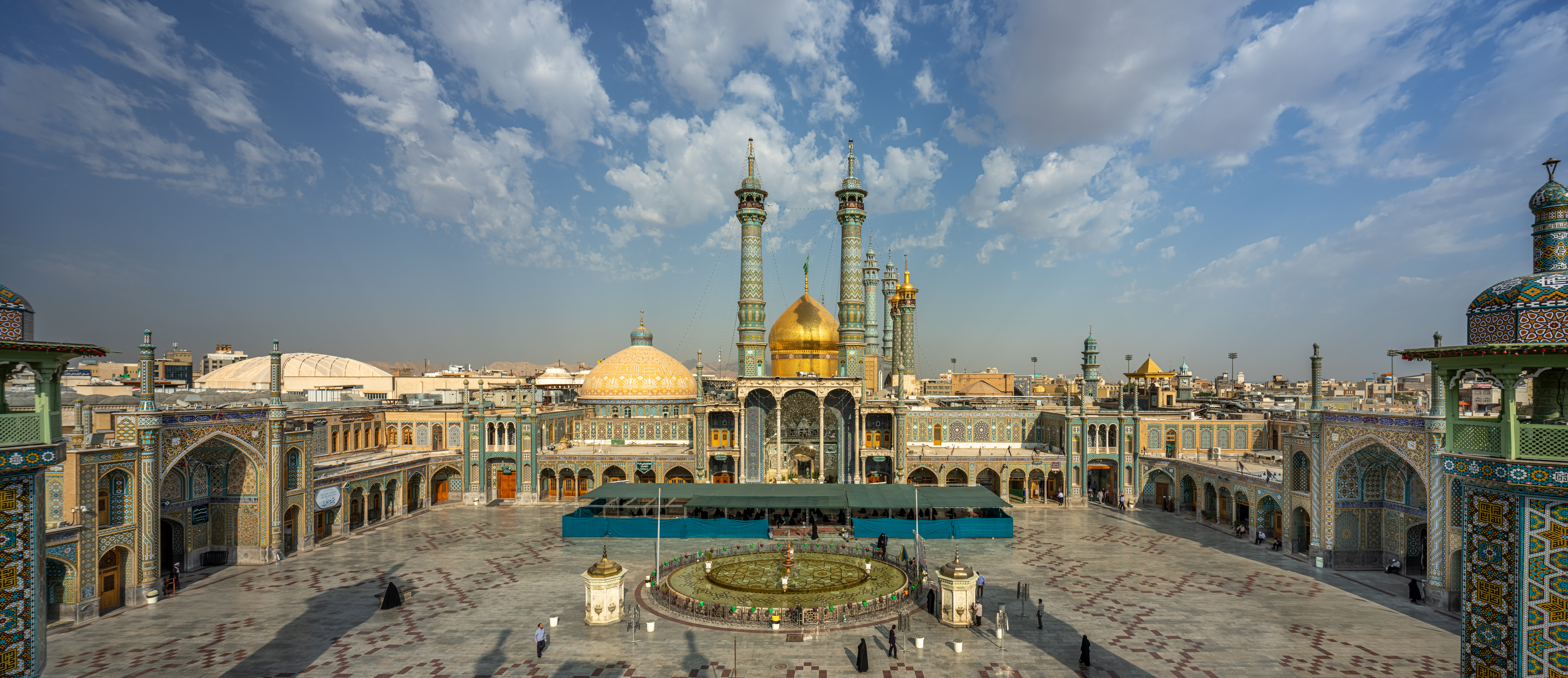

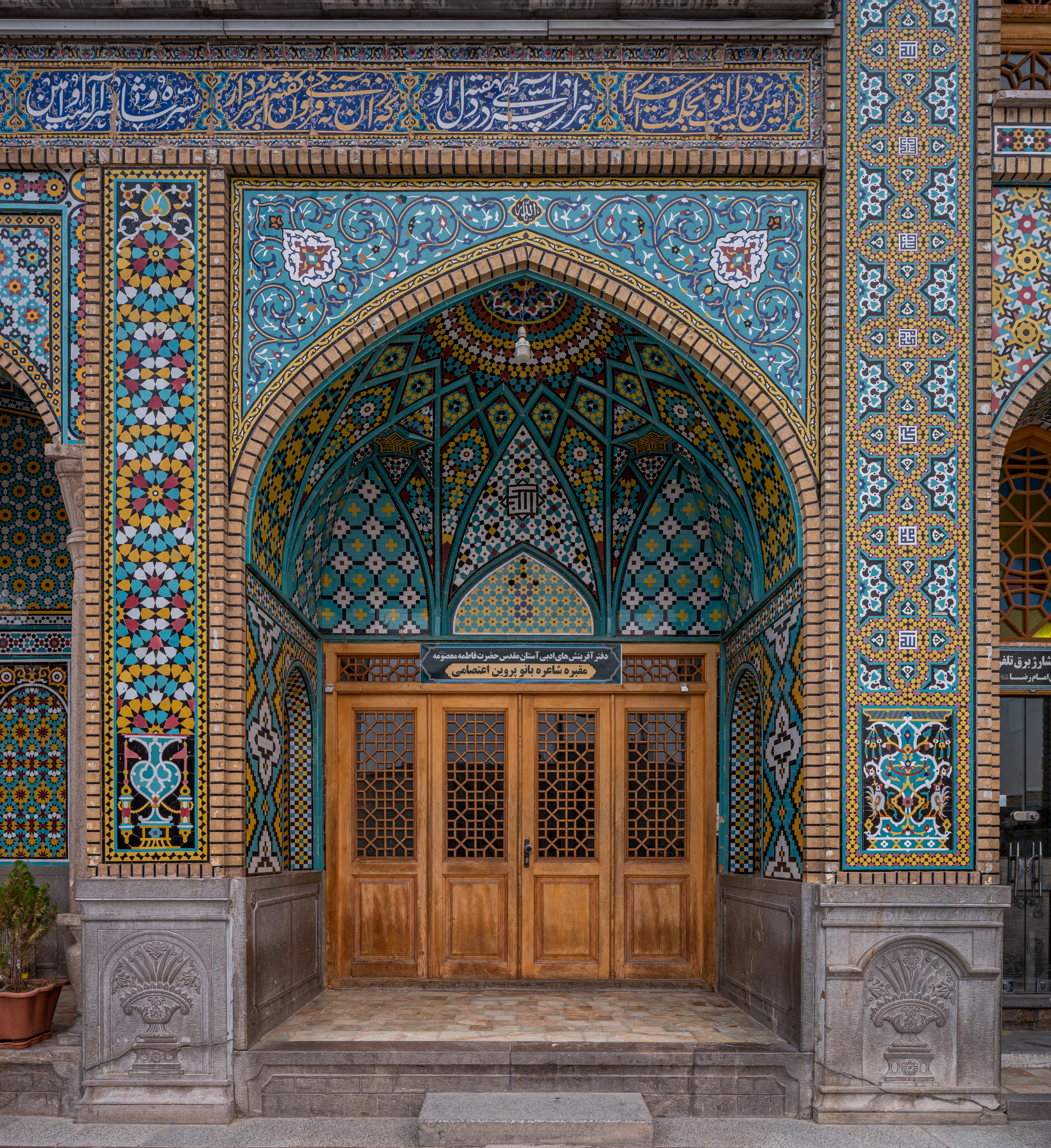

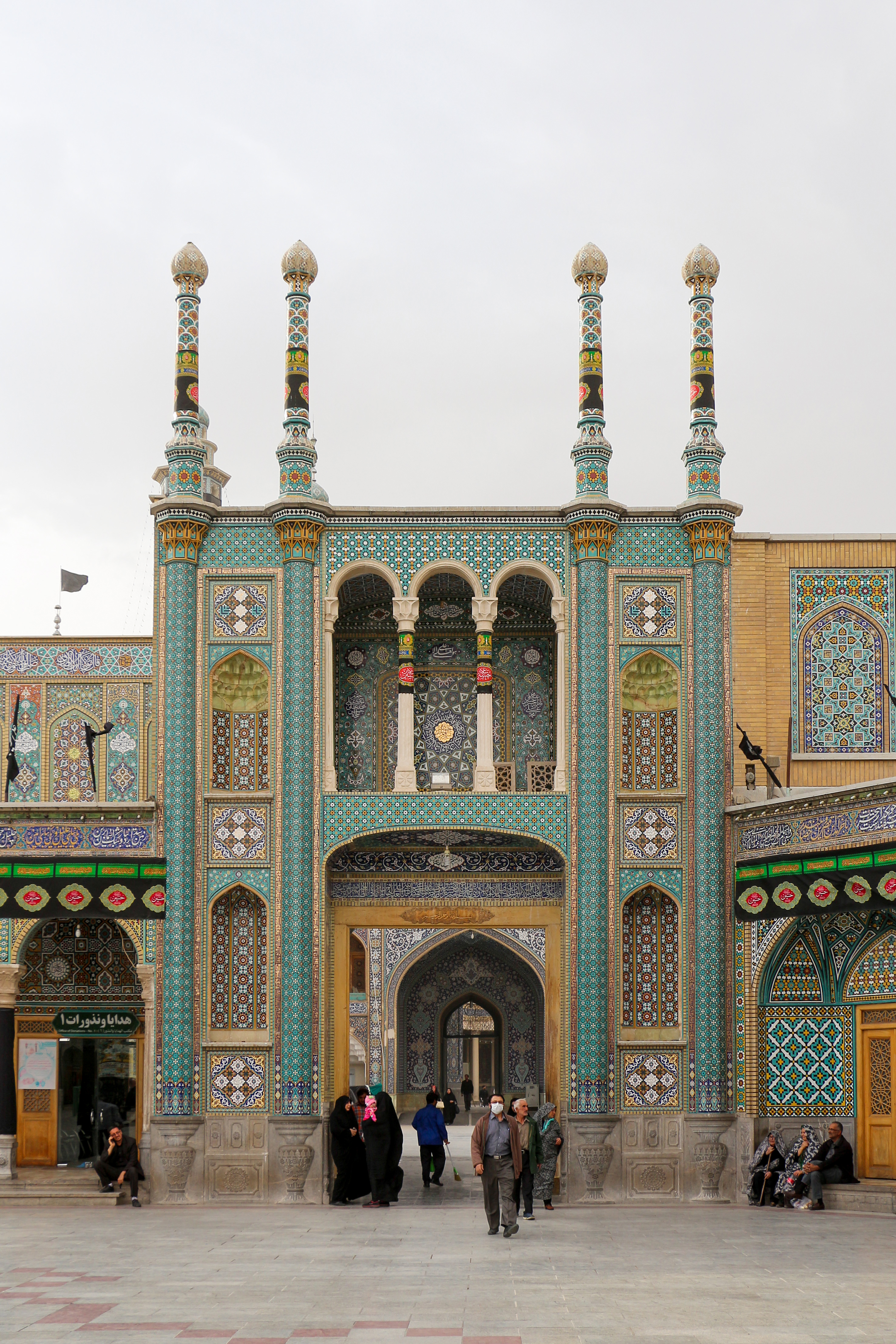

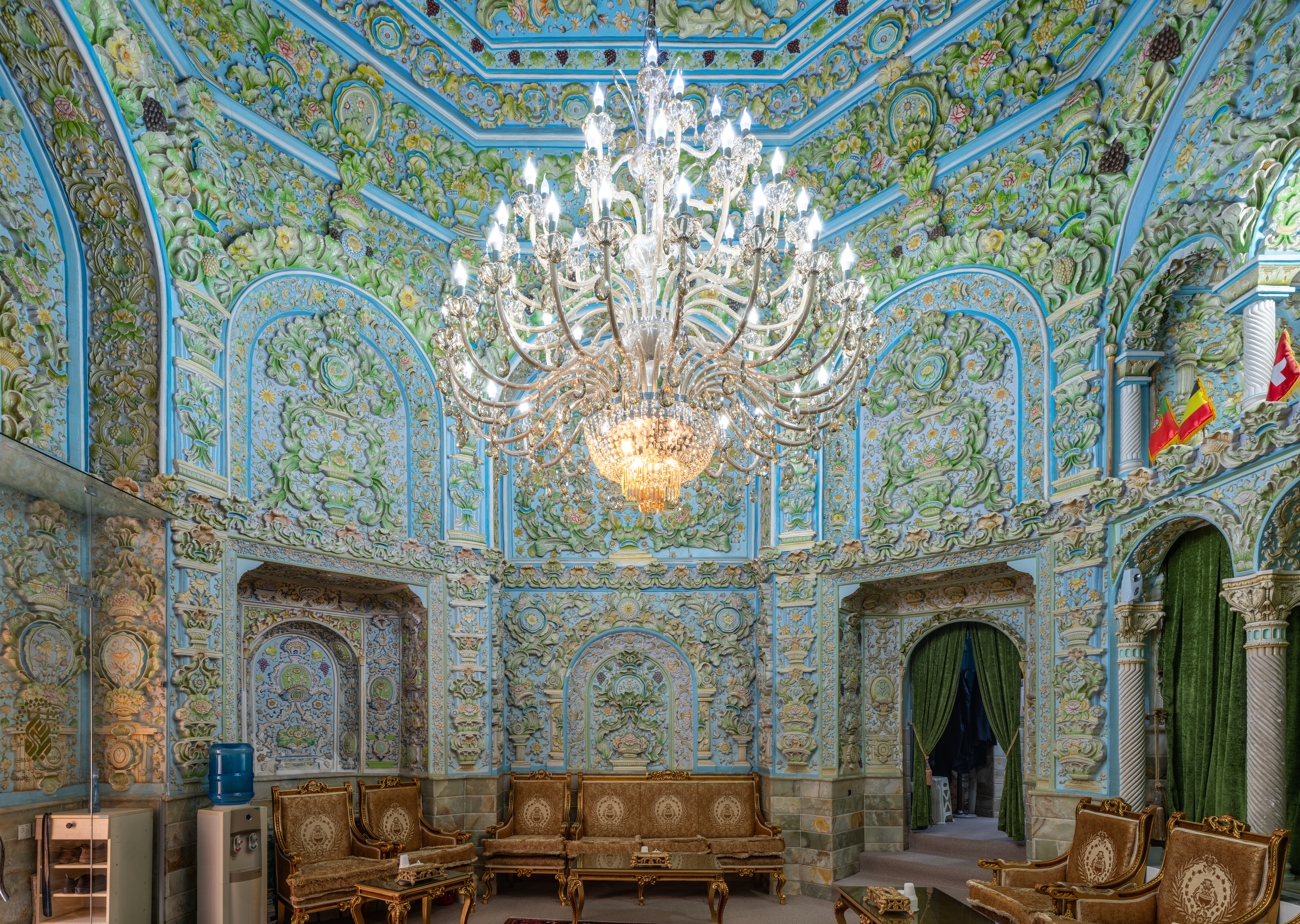

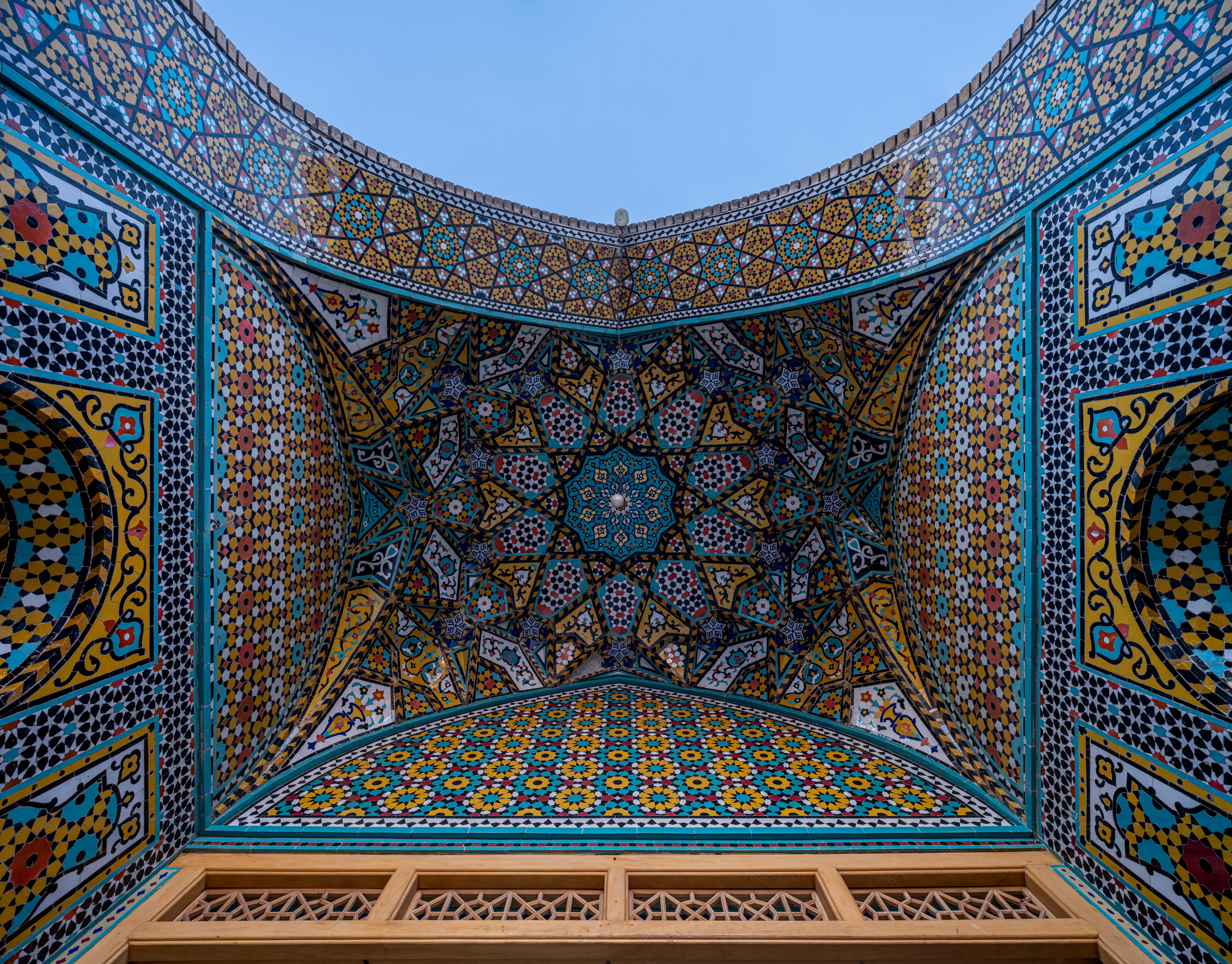

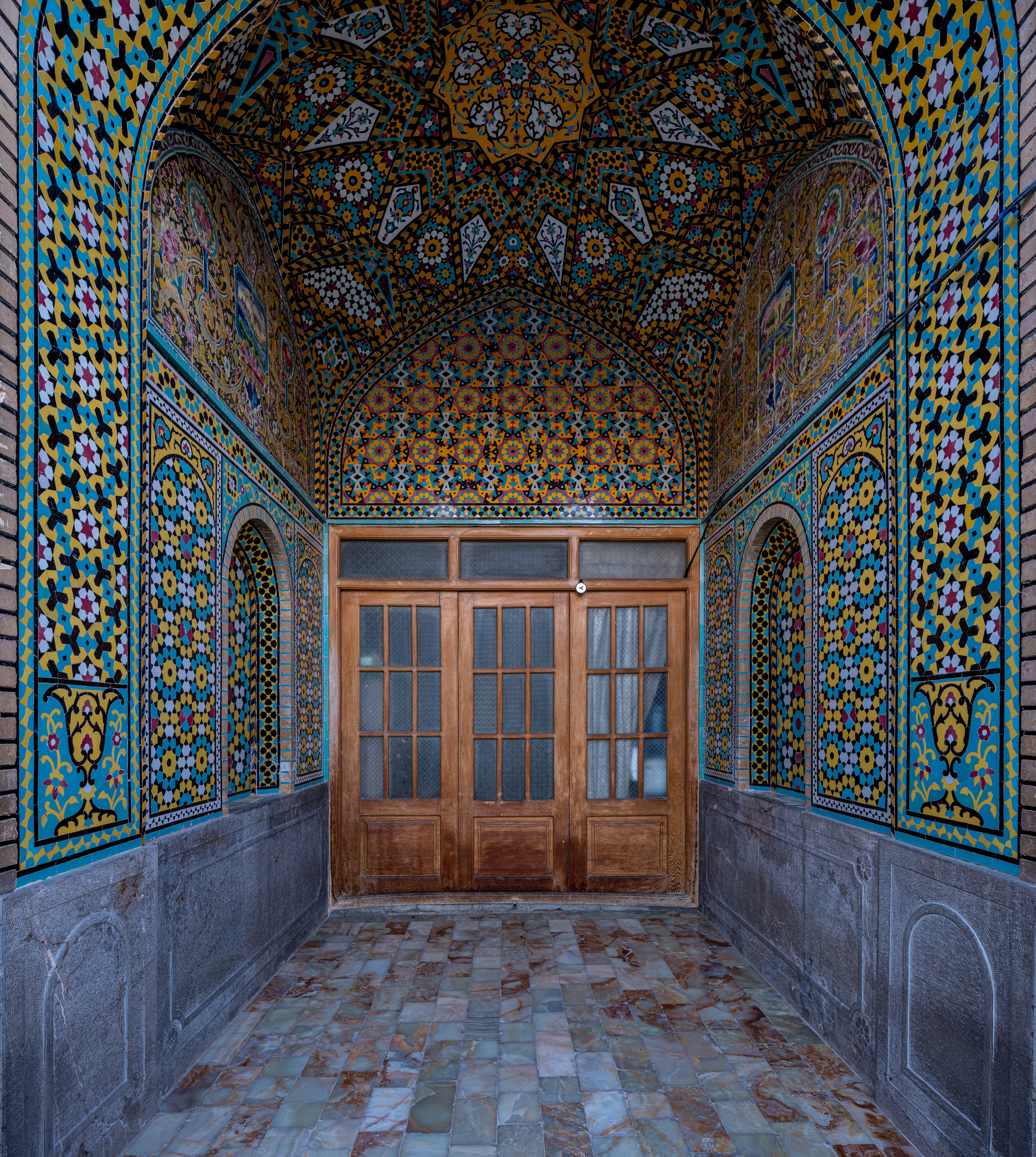

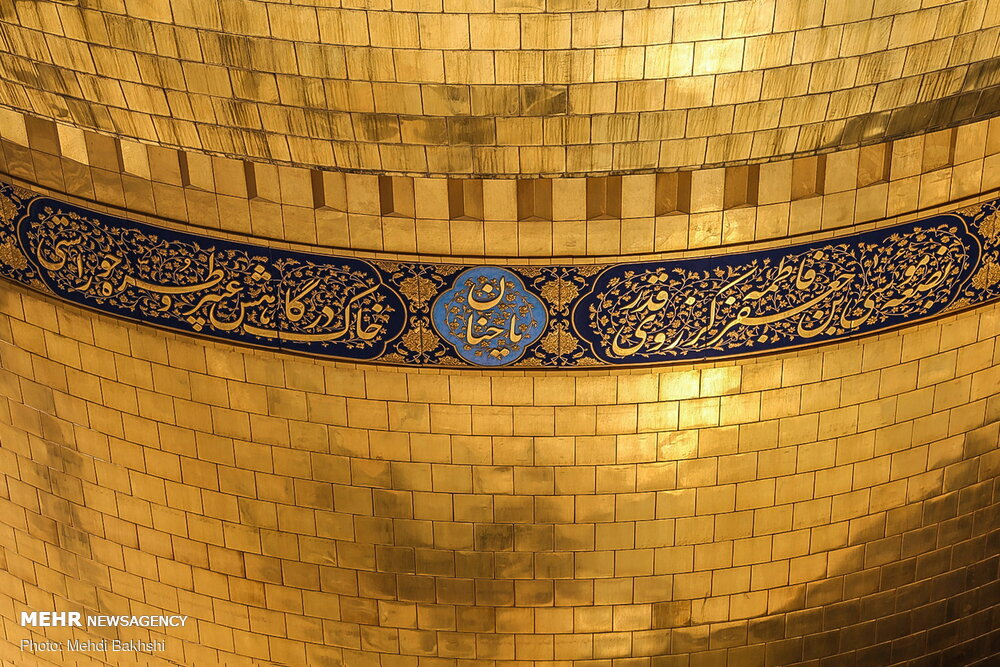

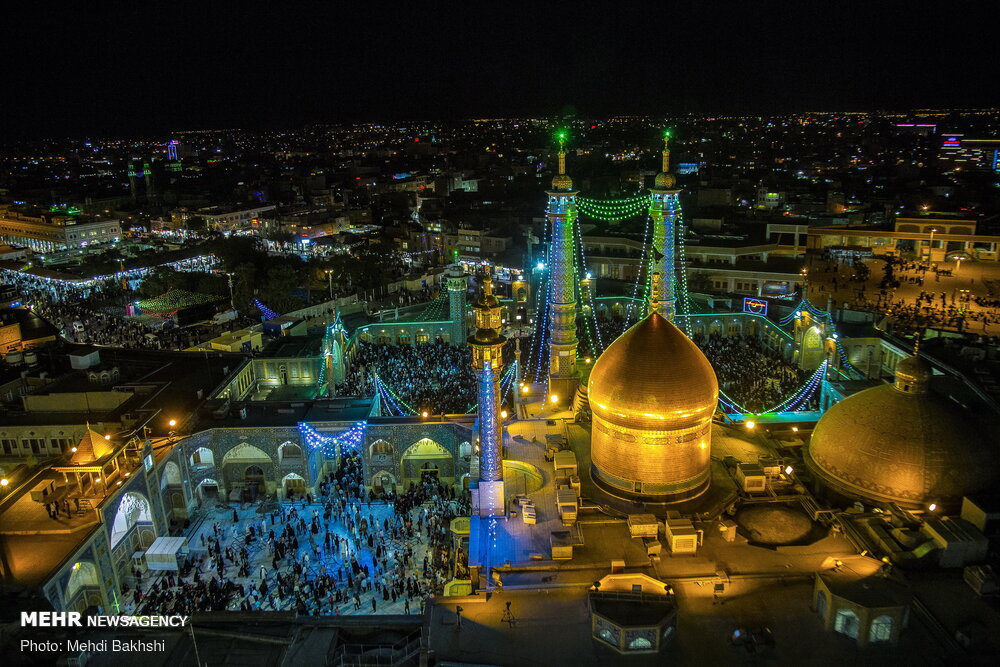

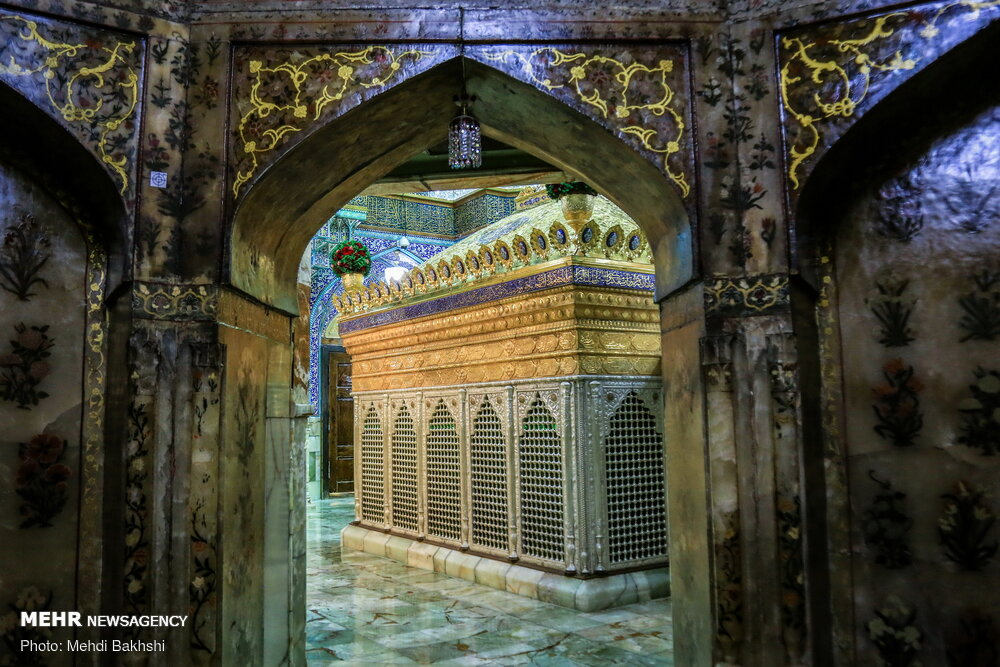

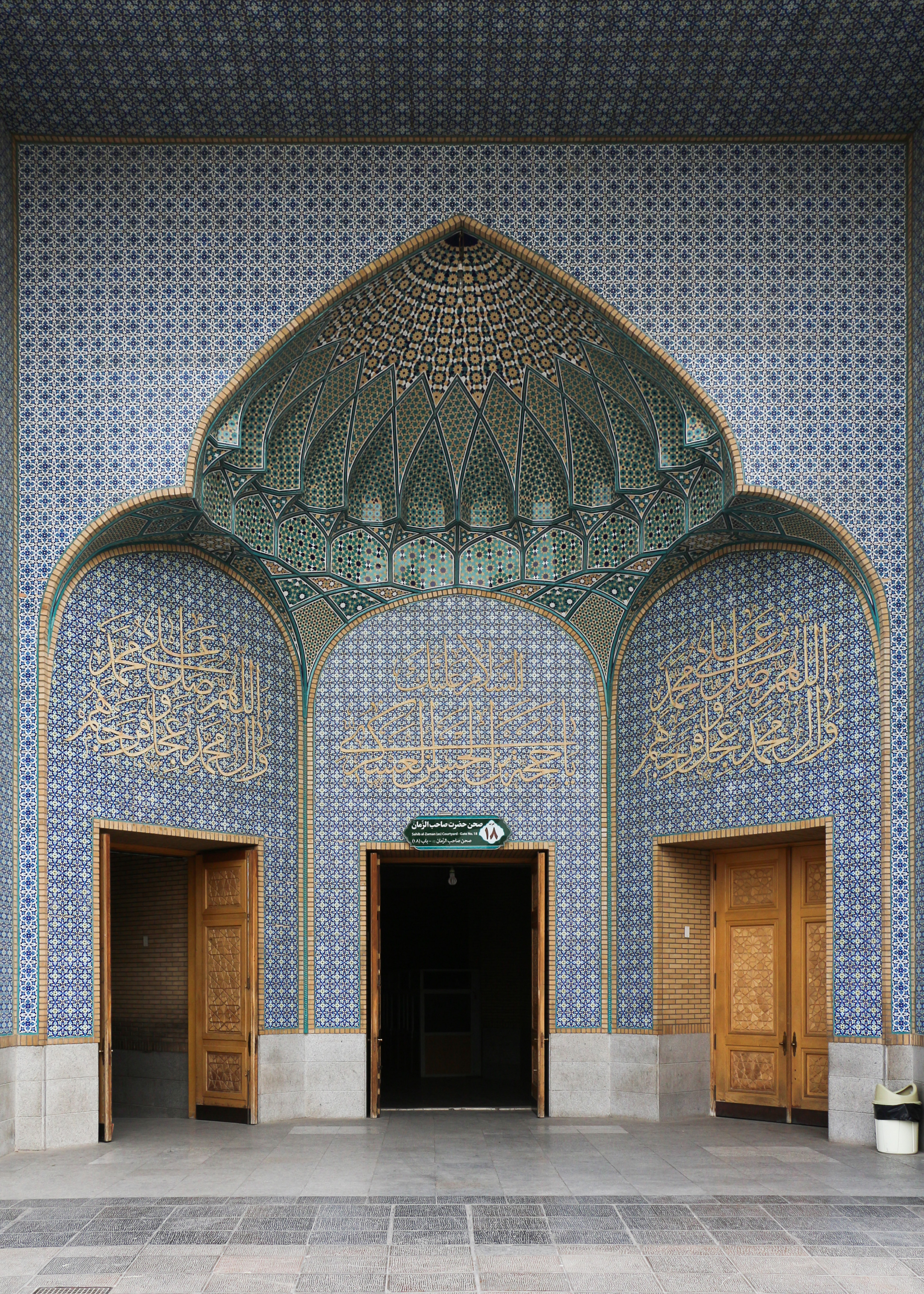

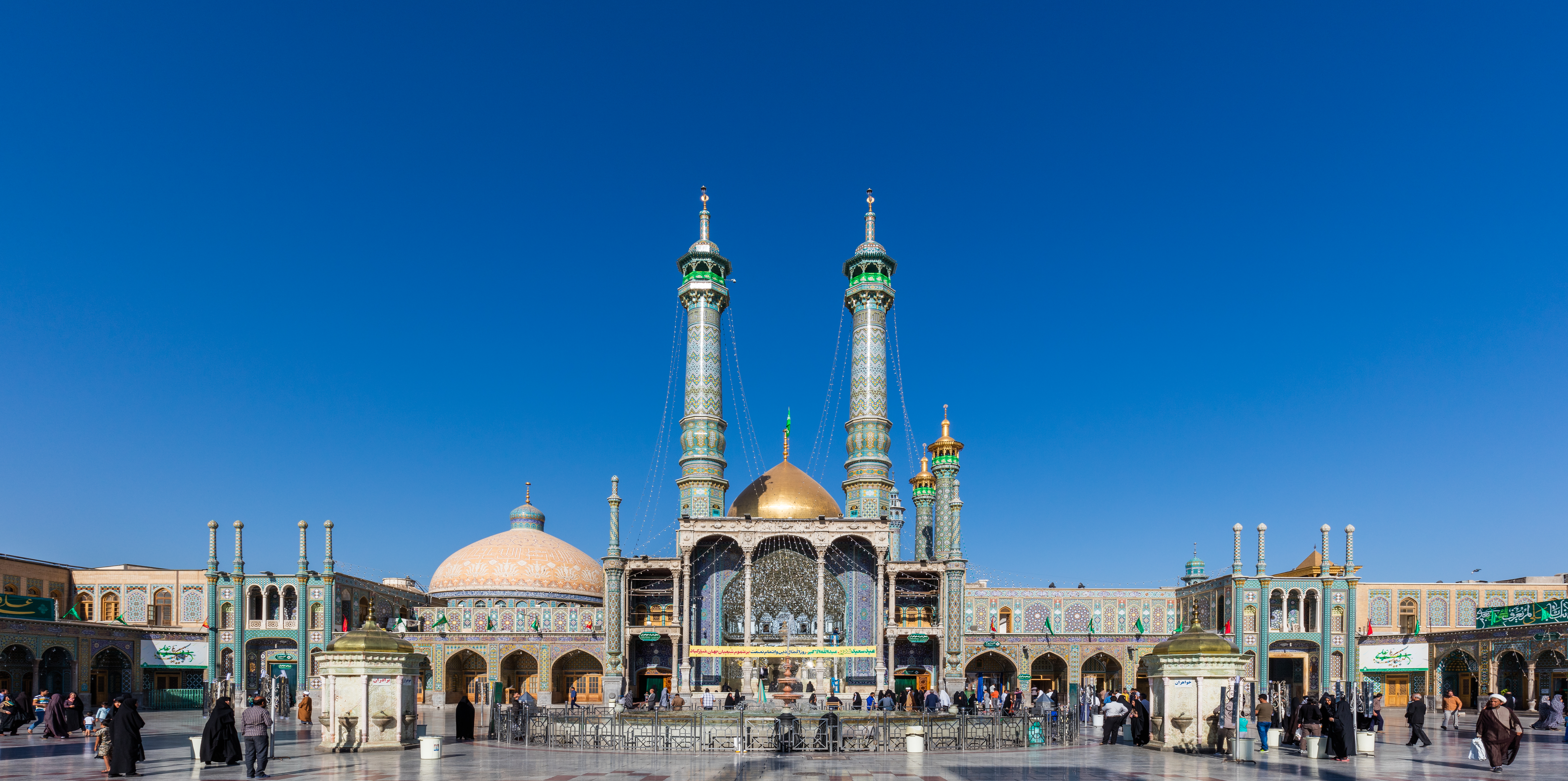

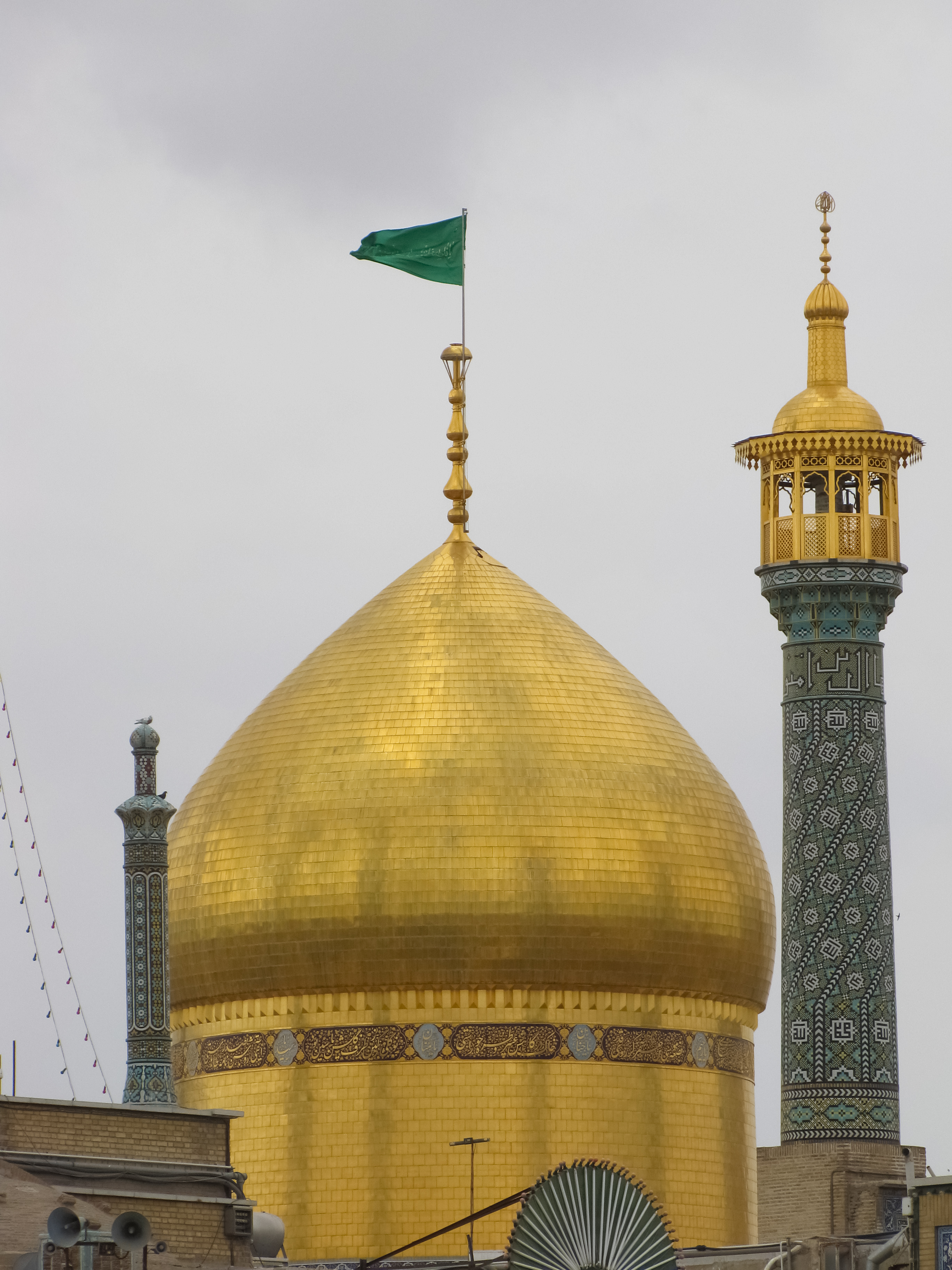

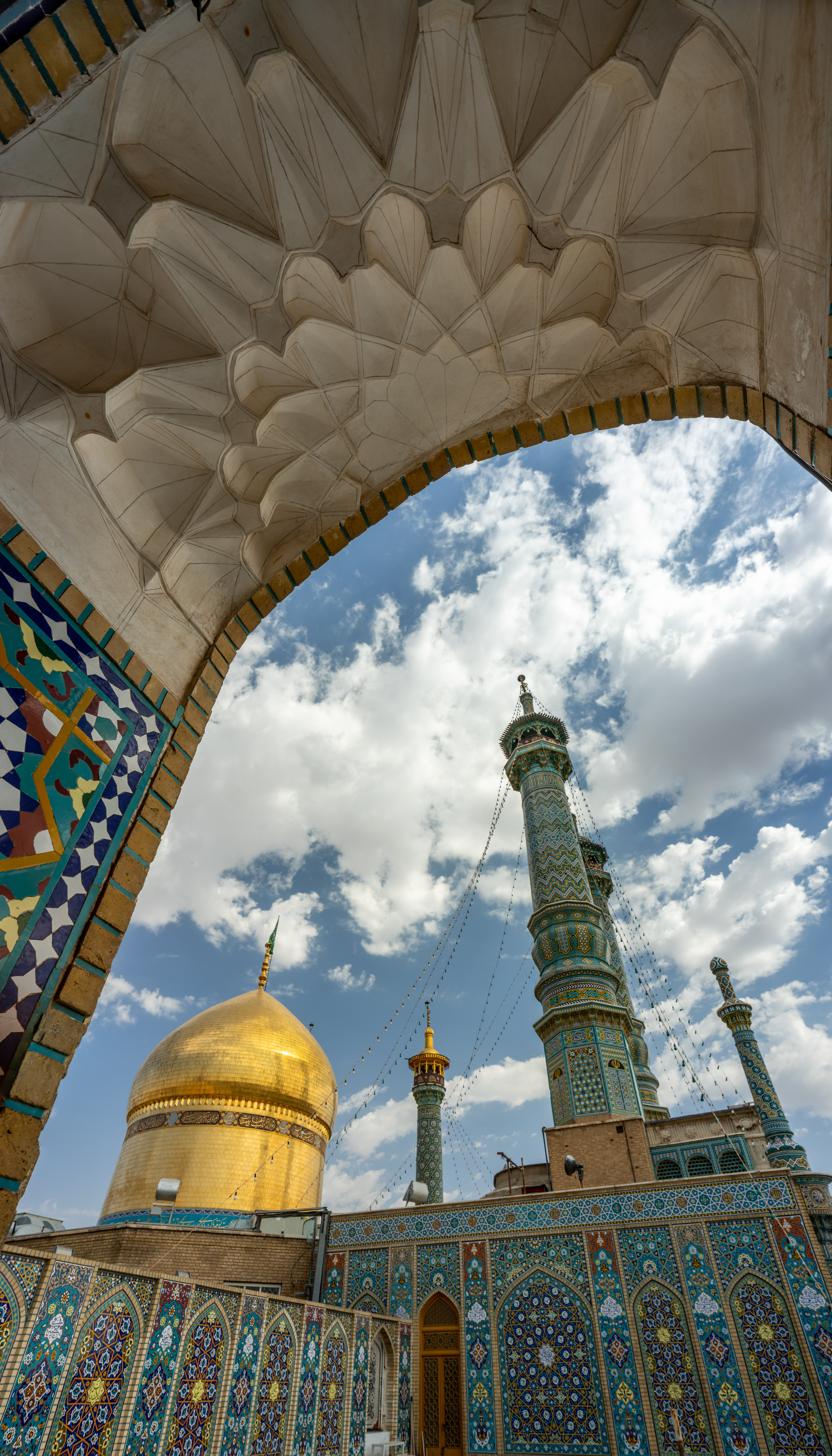

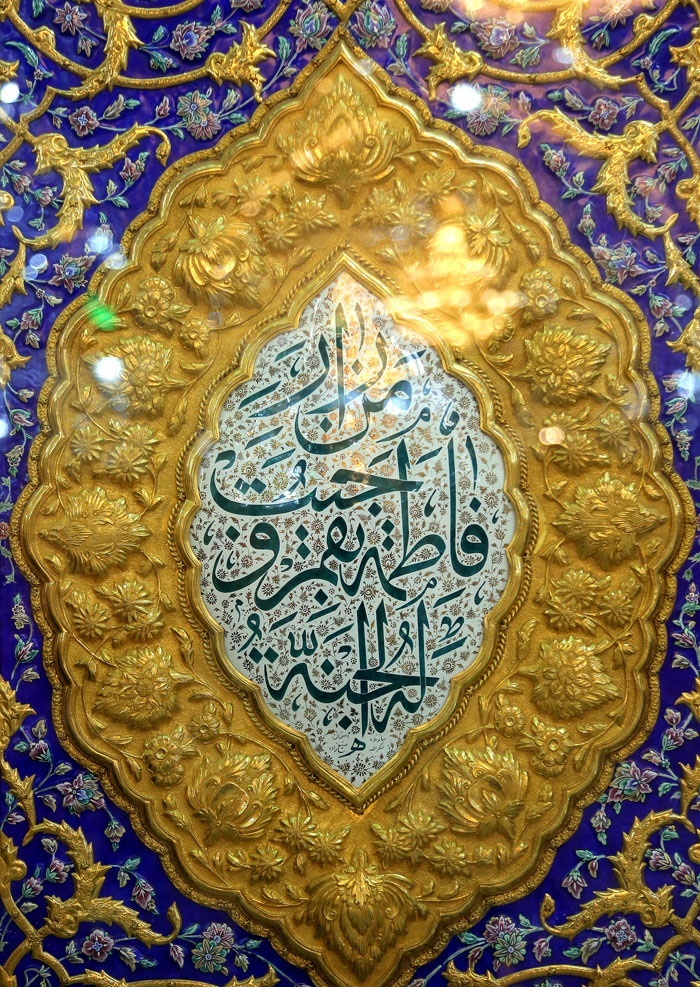

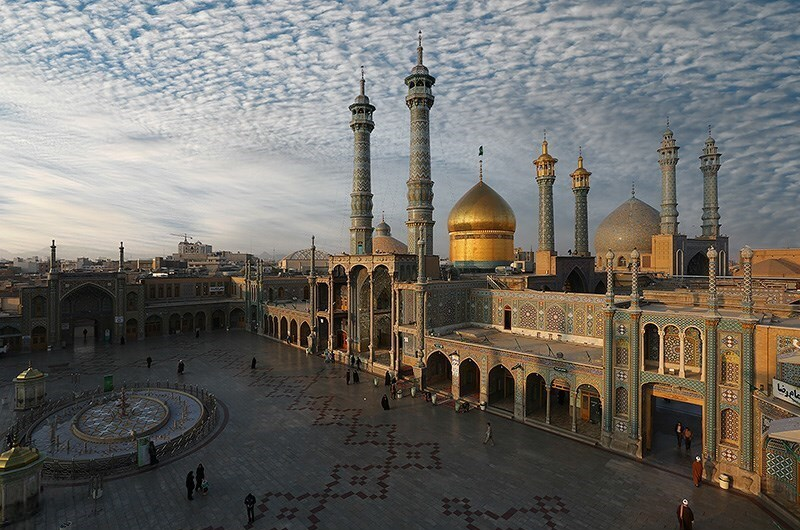

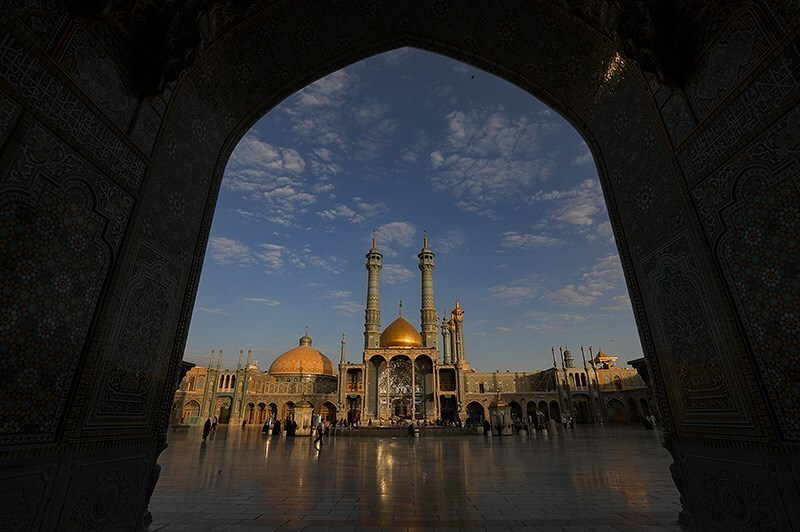

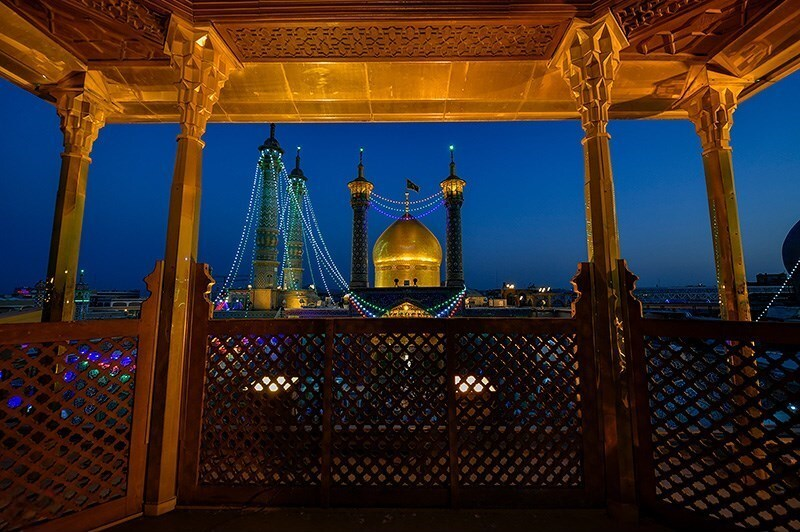

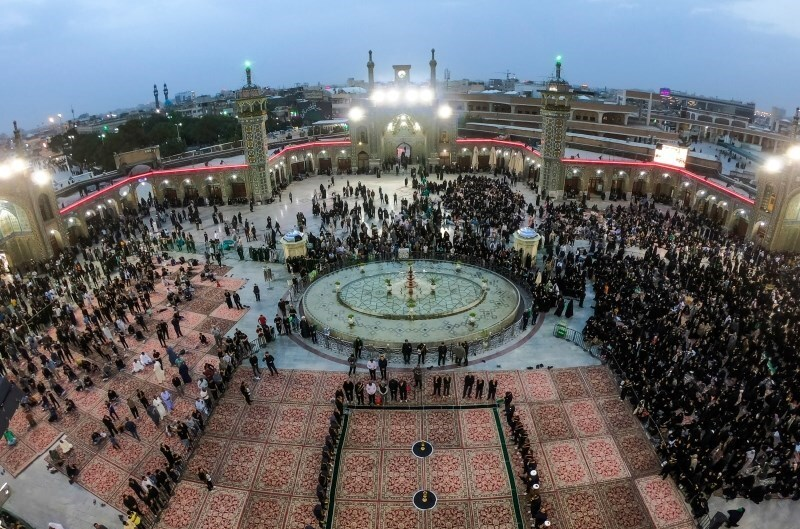

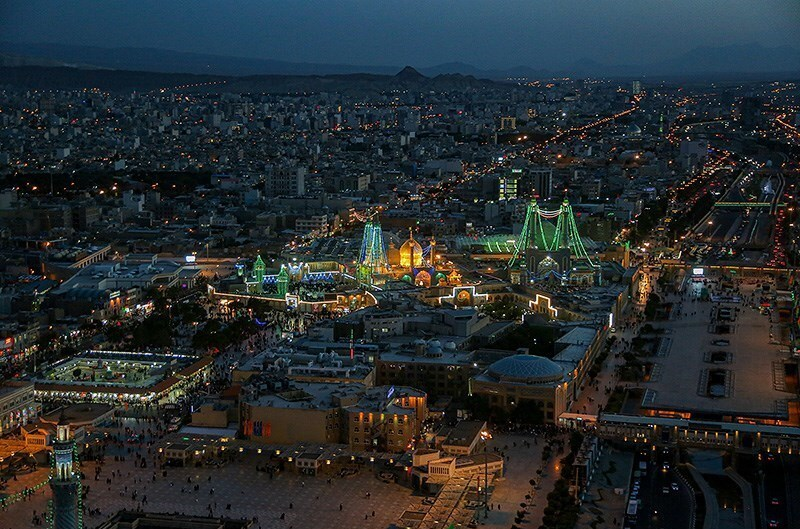

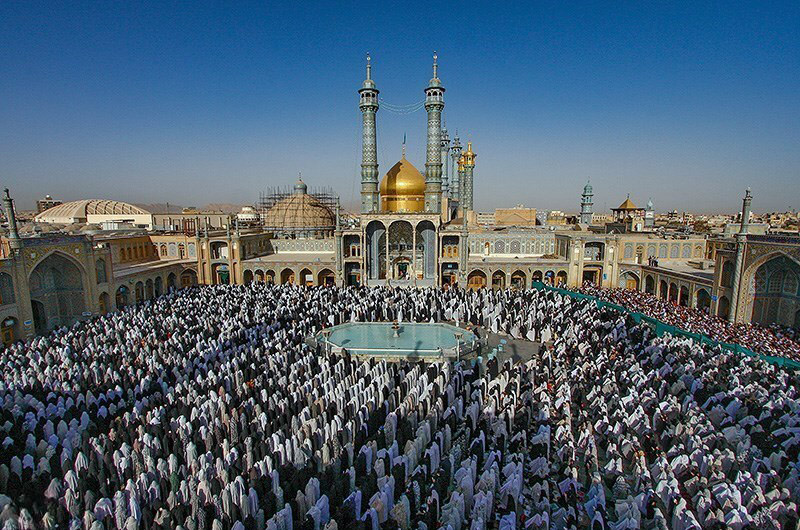

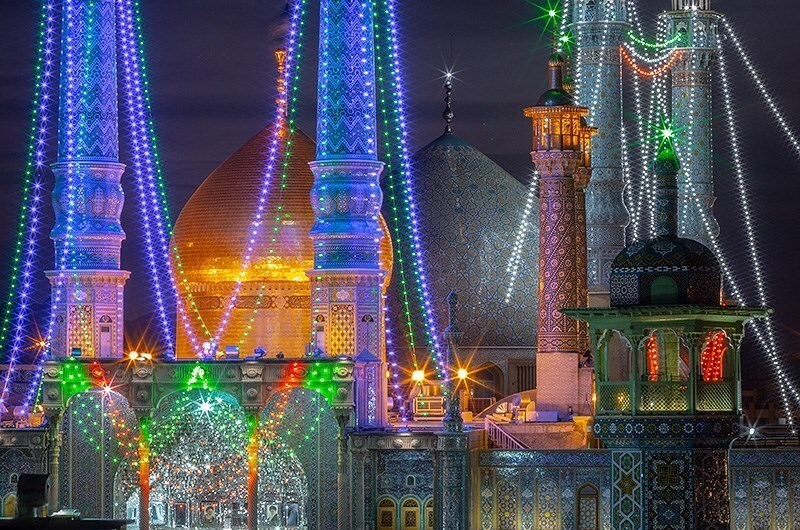

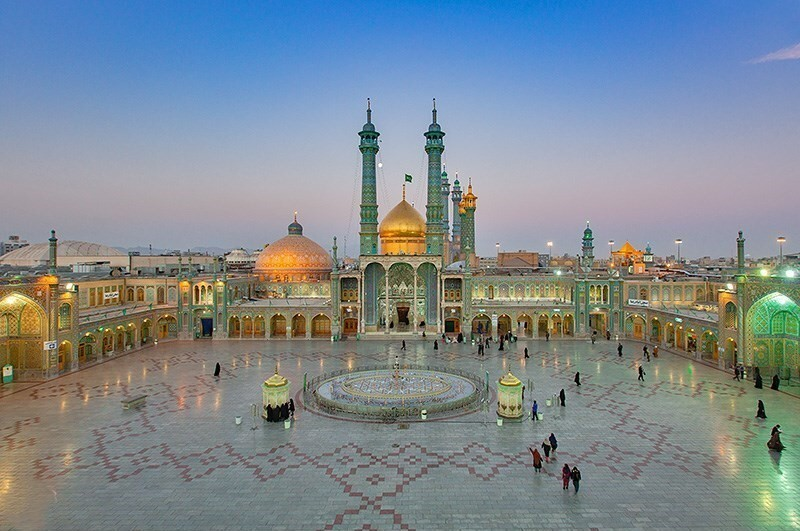

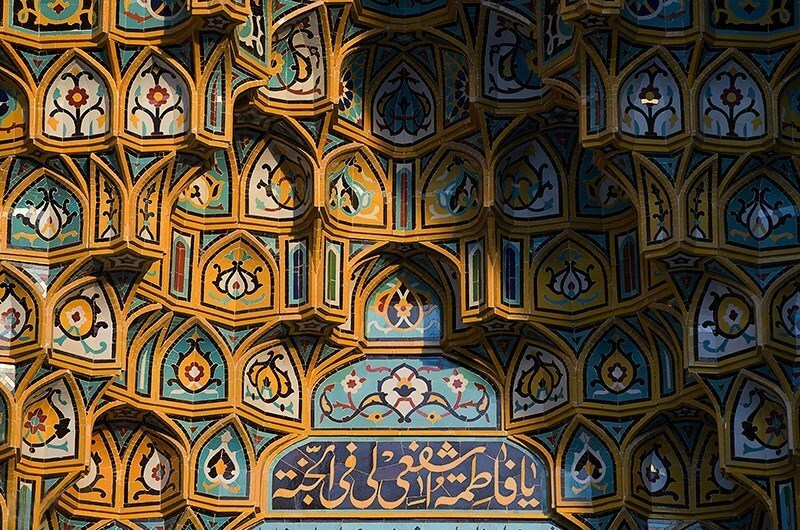

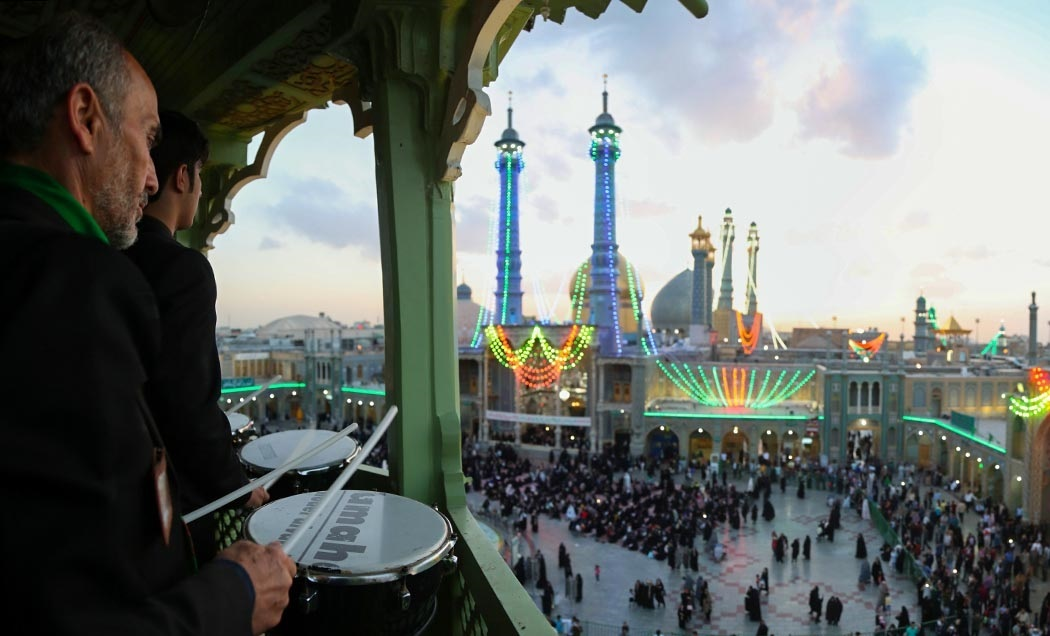

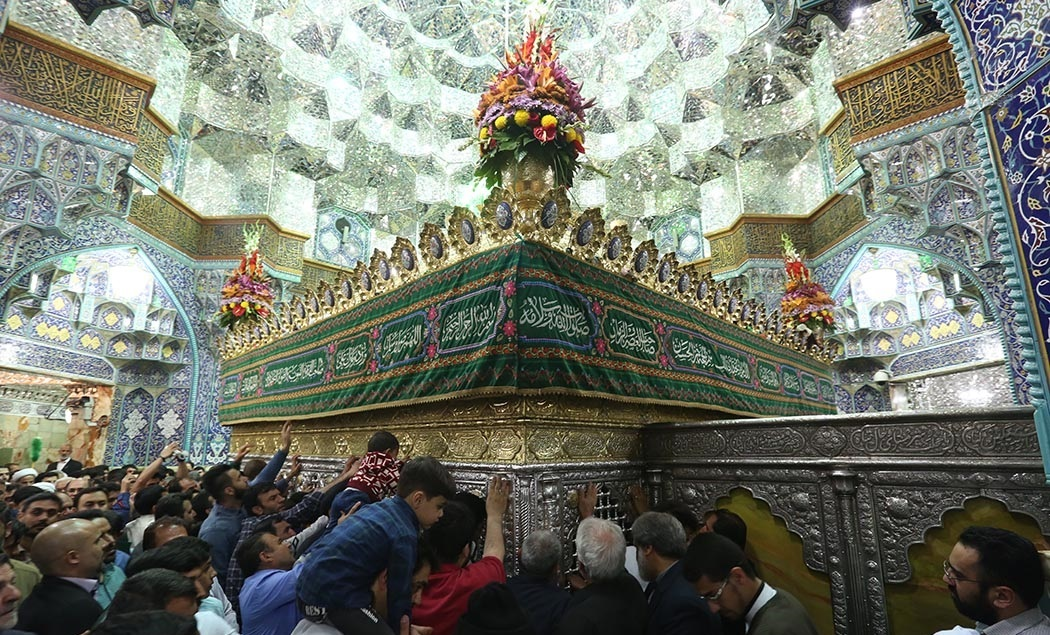

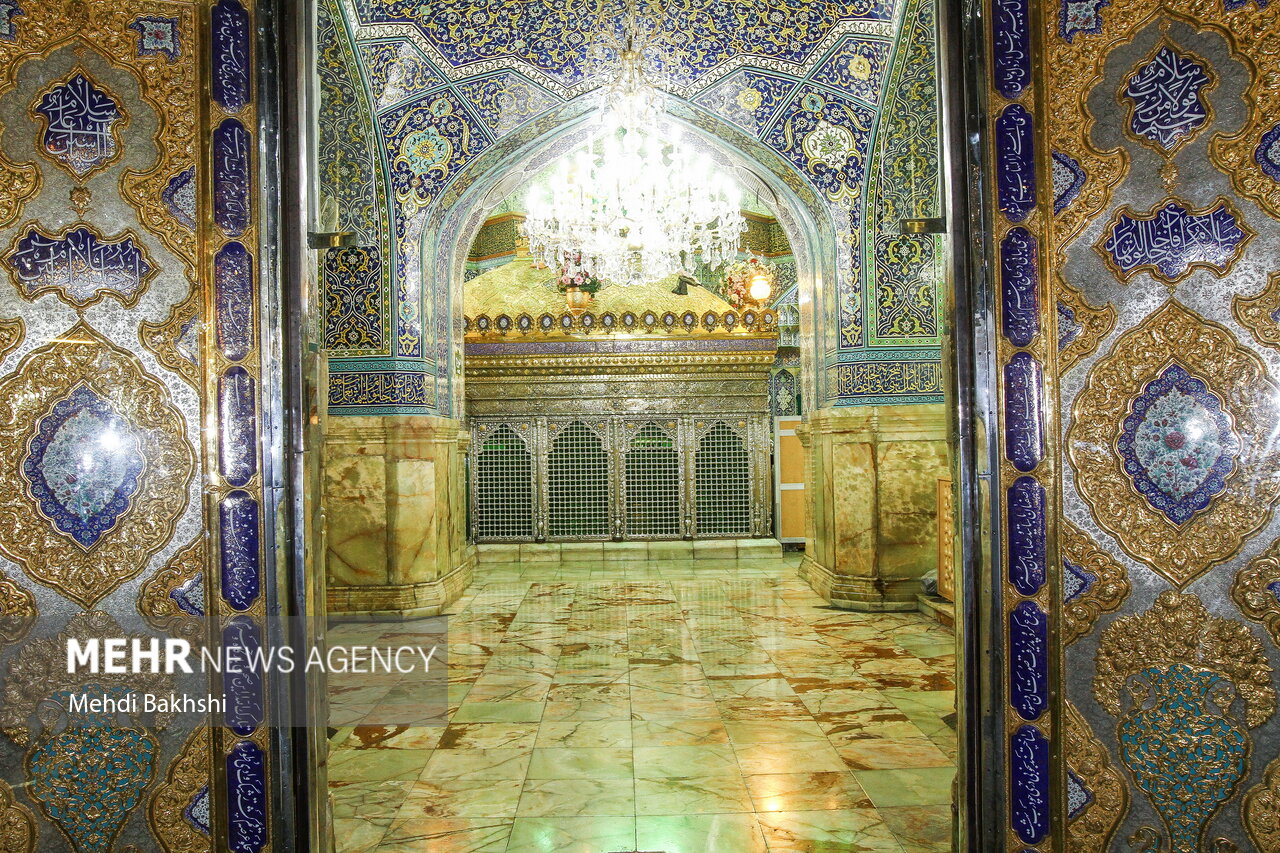

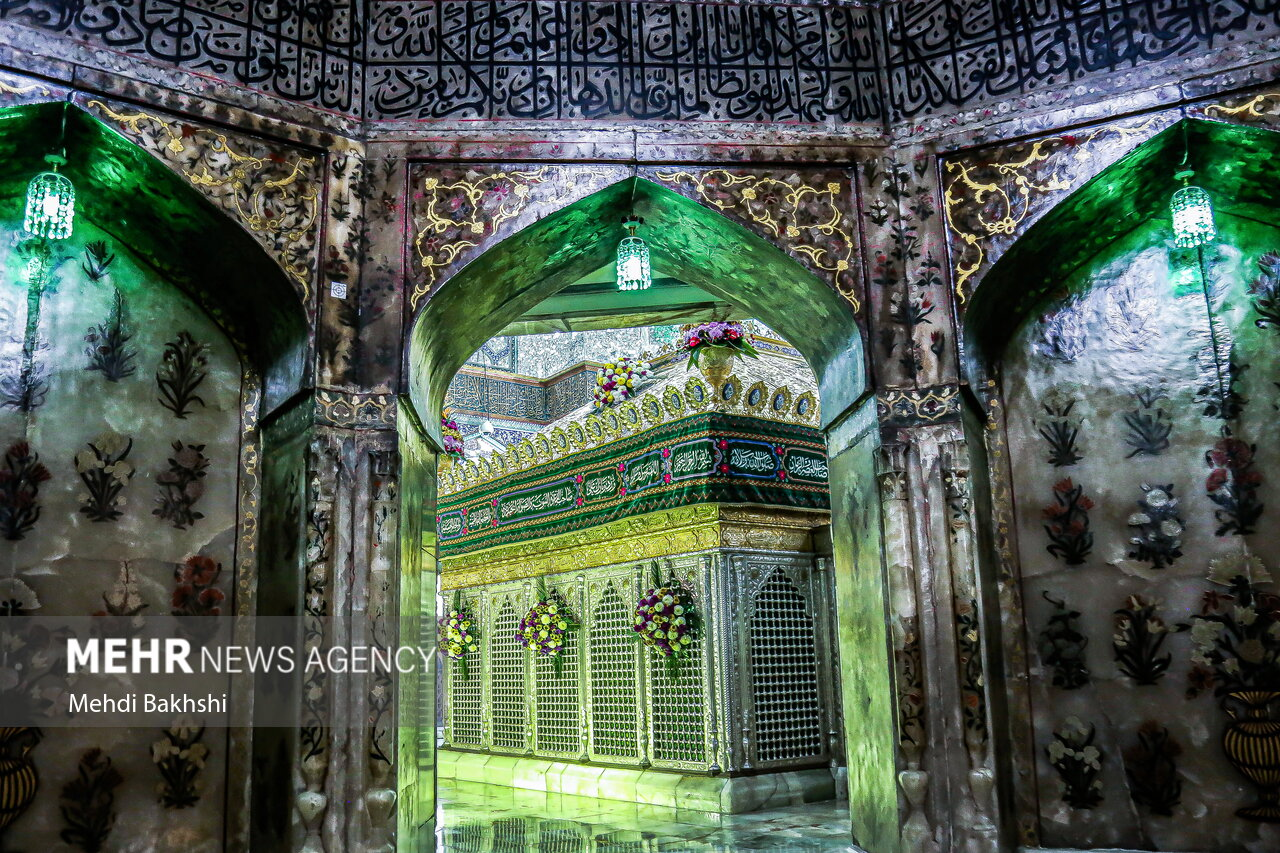

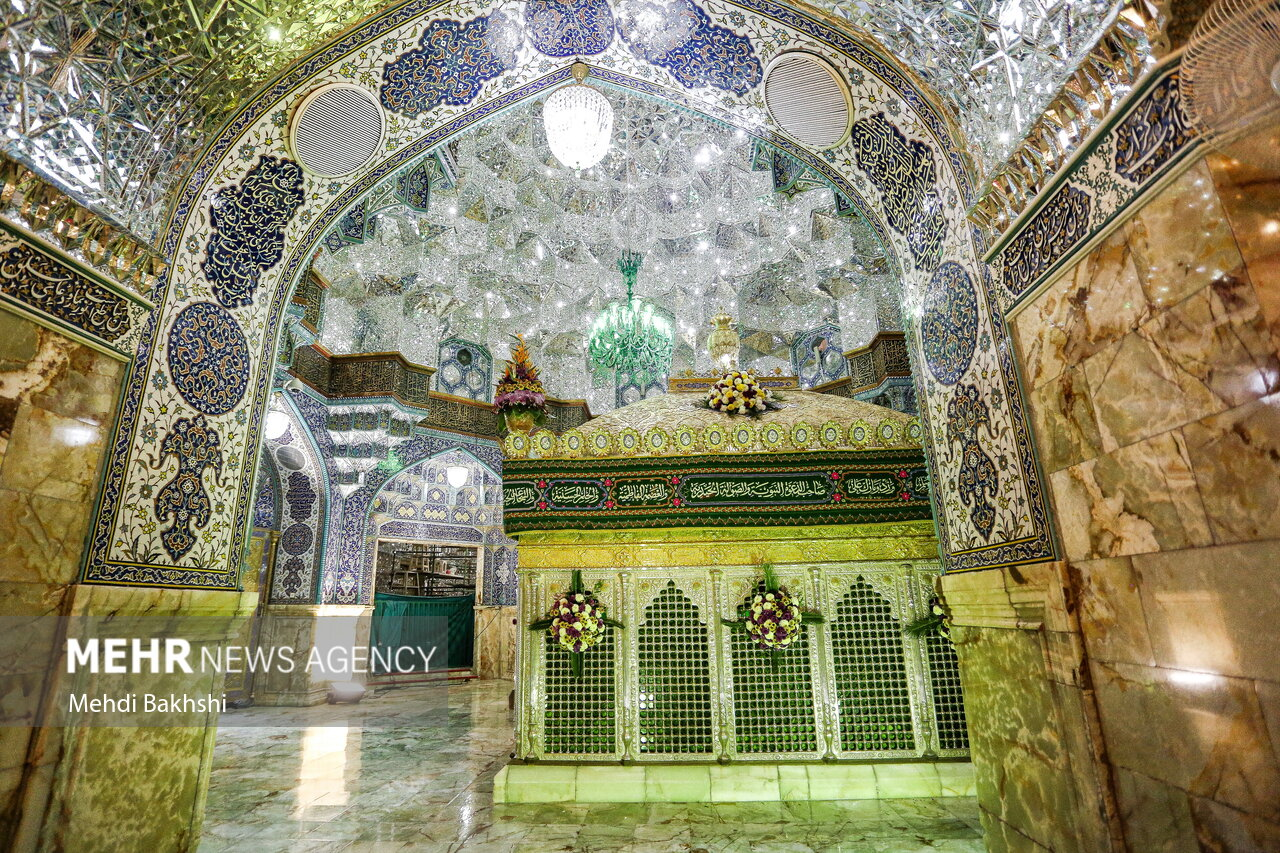

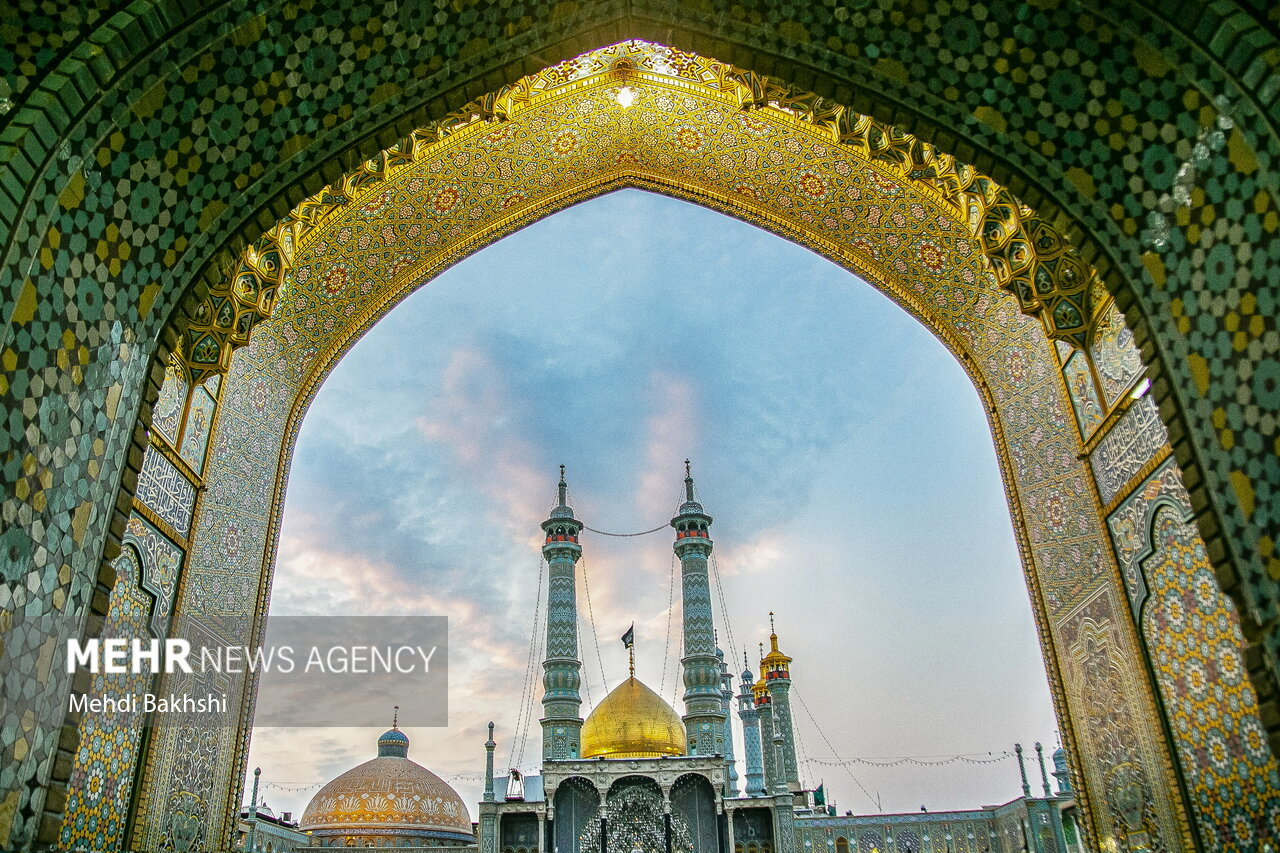

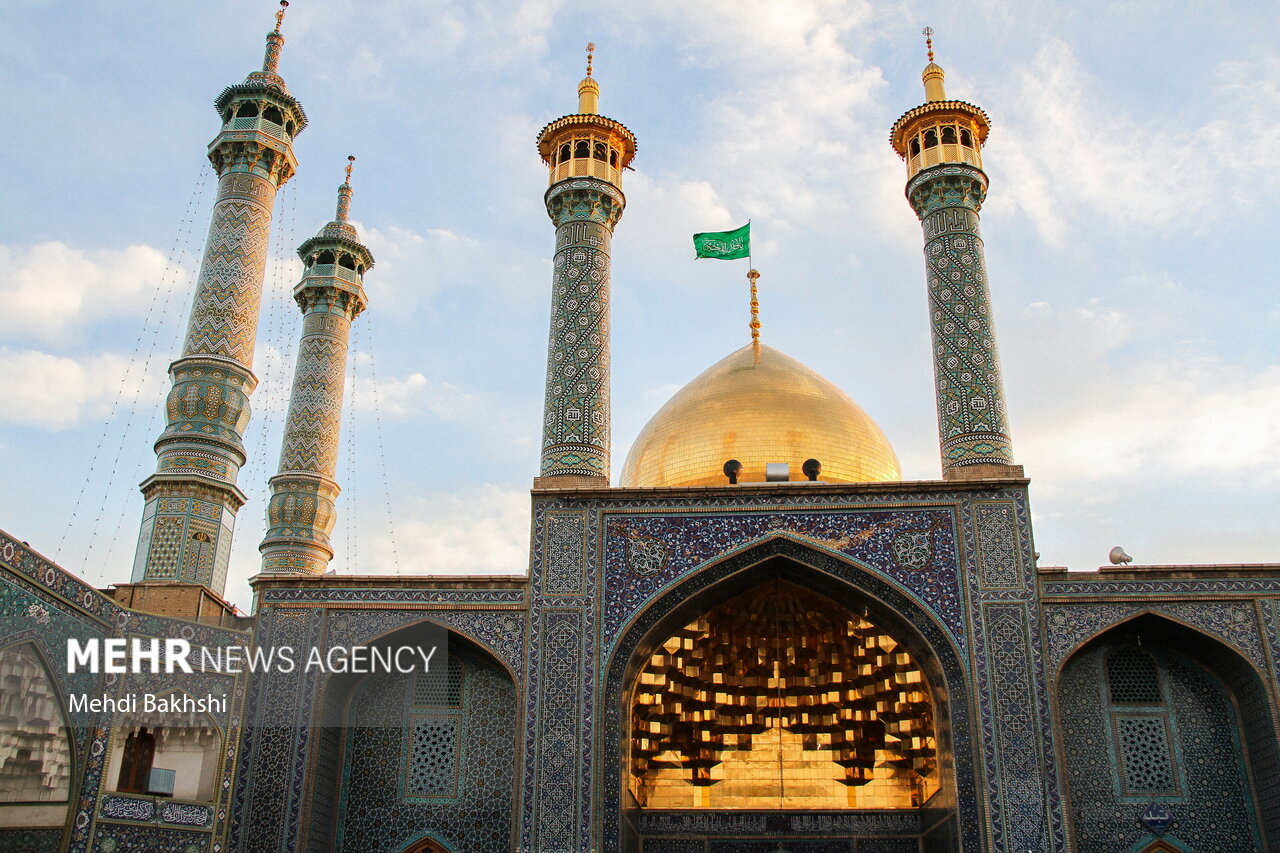

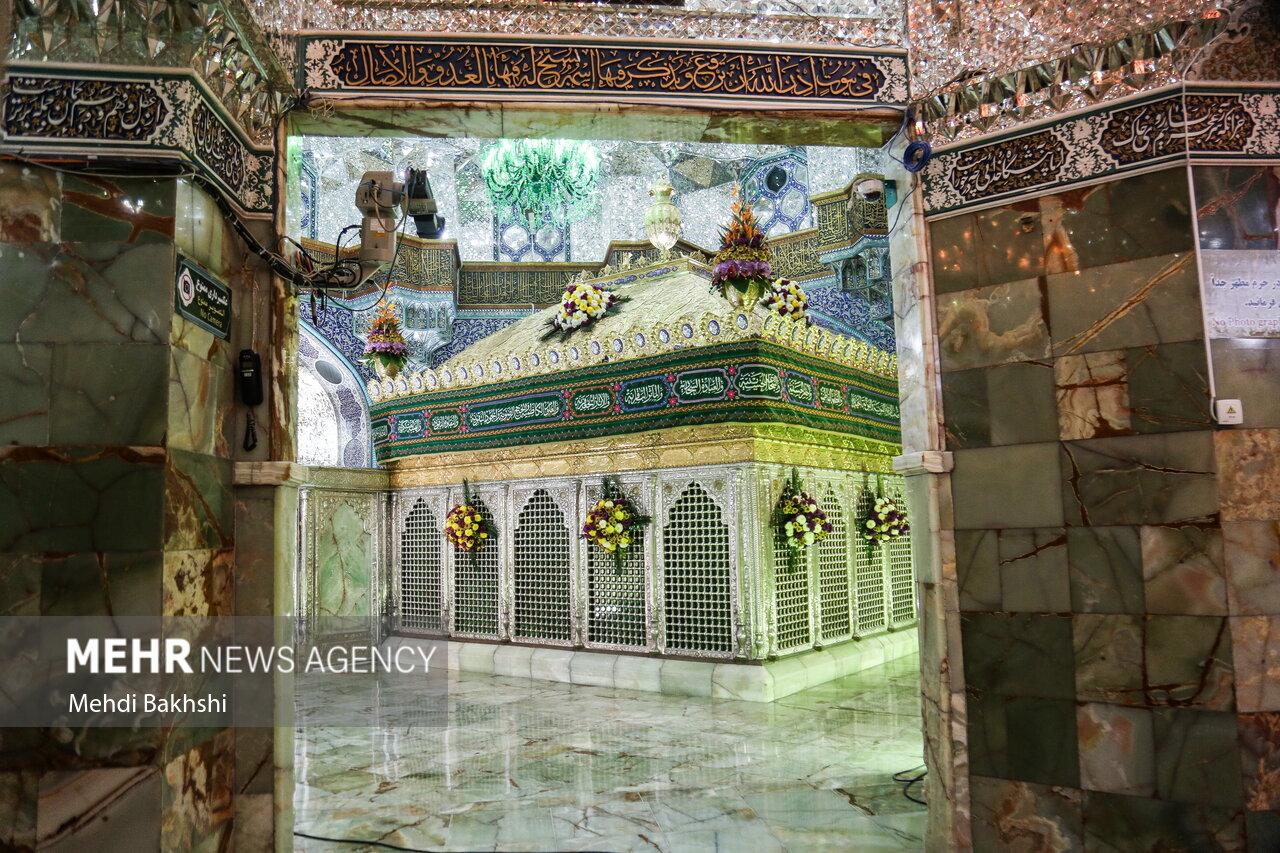

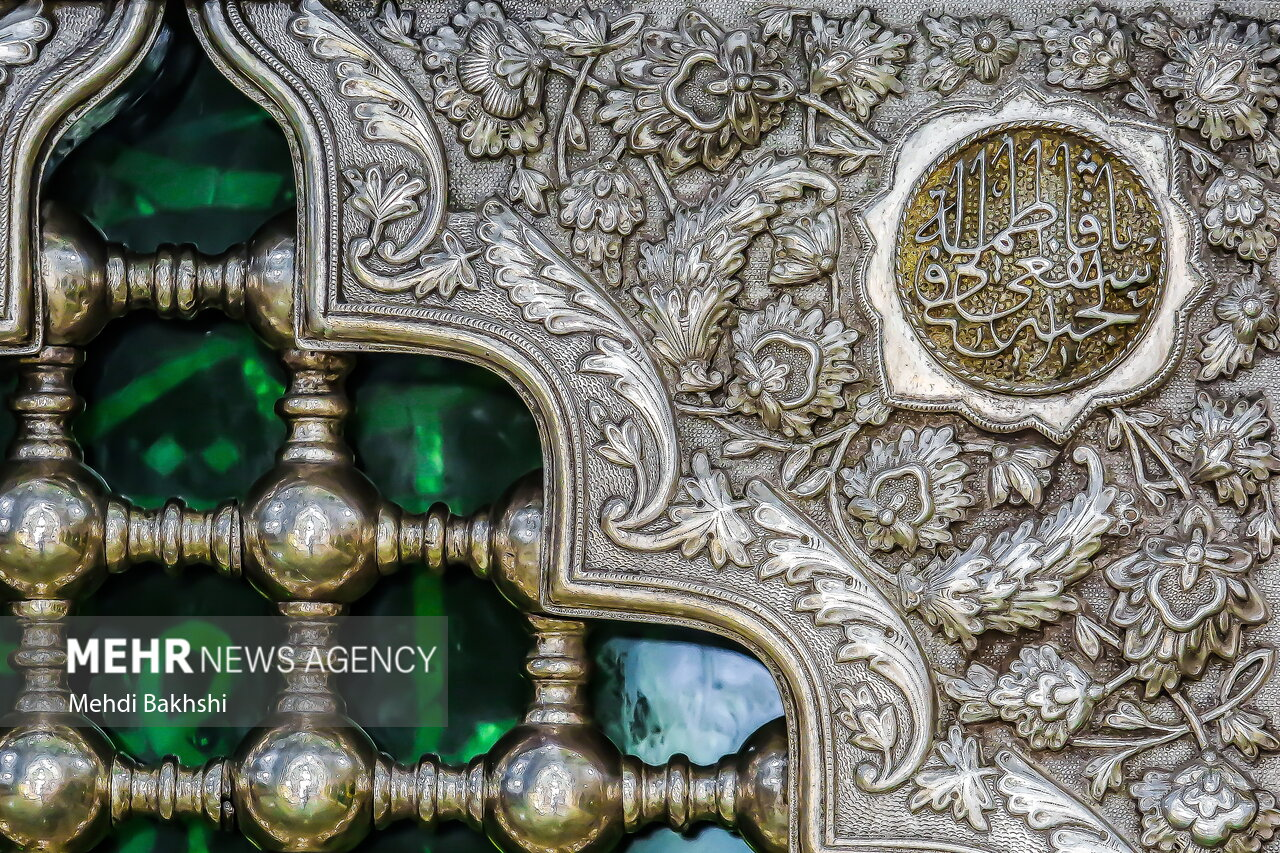

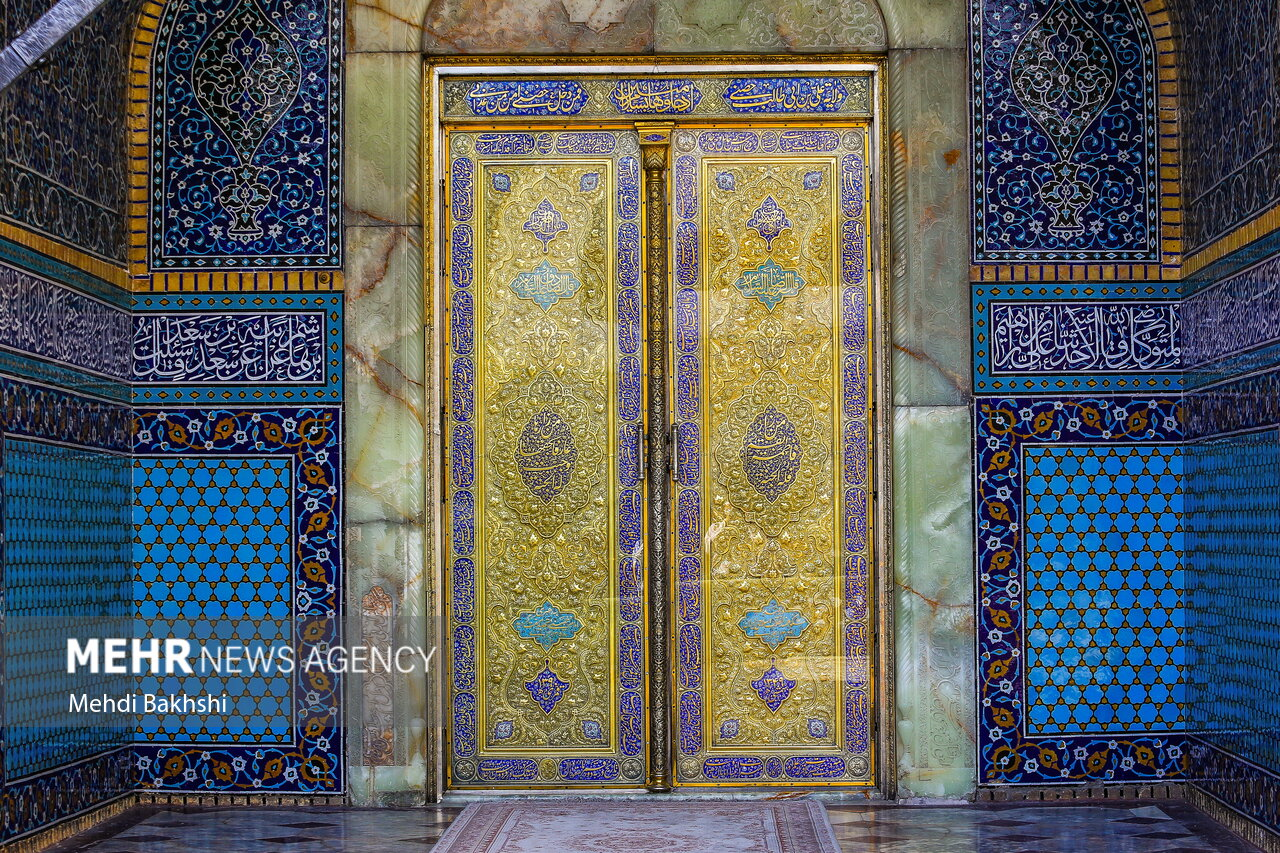

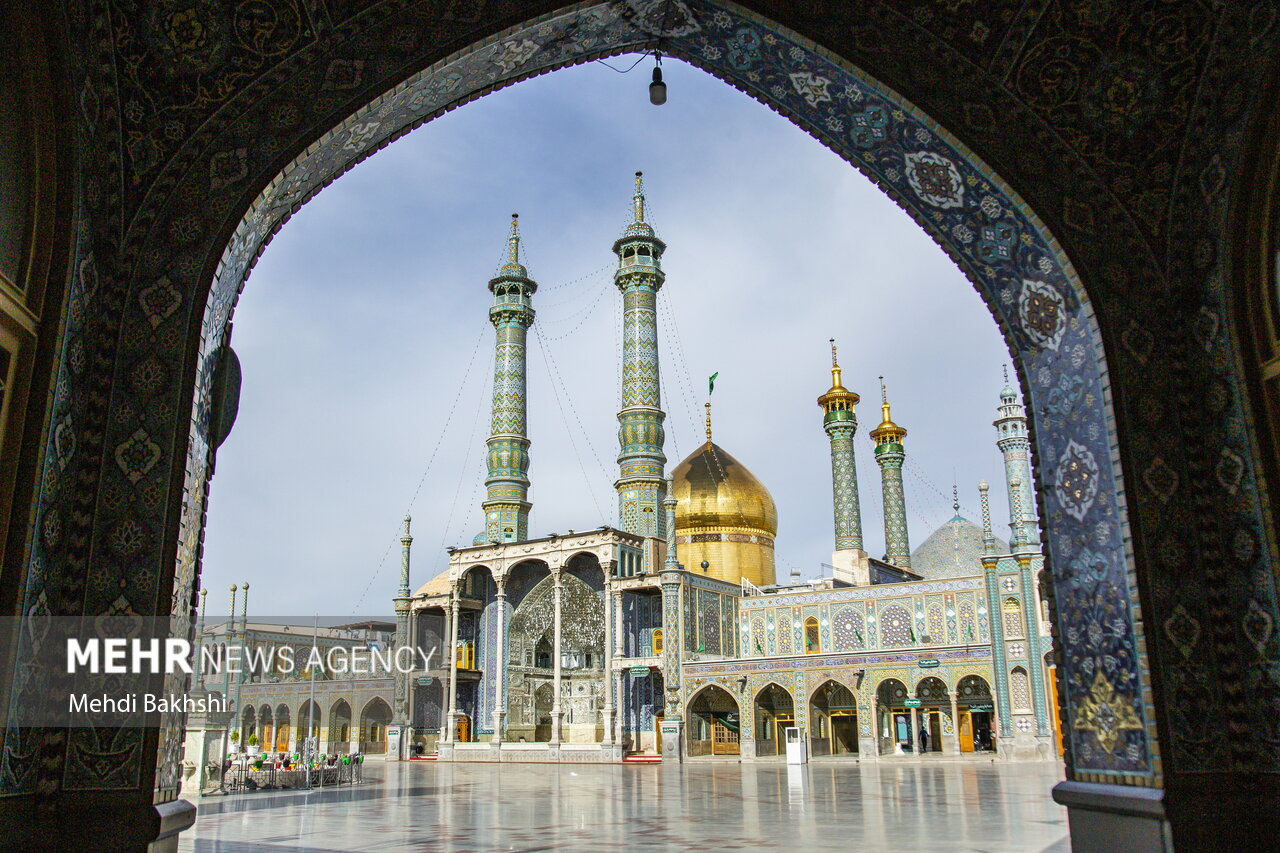

== See also ==
- List of mausoleums in Iran
- Shia Islam in Iran
- Holiest sites in Shia Islam
- Seyyed Mohammad Saeedi, the shrine trustee
