= List of deceased maraji =

This article provides the list of deceased maraji (plural of marja, the supreme legal authority or the source of emulation), followed by Twelver (also known as Imamiyyah) Shia Muslims around the world. The concept of a marja-i taqlid (lit. source of emulation) is central to Usuli Shi'a Islam. Marja-i taqlids provide religious interpretations on matters of law and rituals. Among the functions of marja-i taqlids is the collection and distribution of religious taxes (Zakat and Khums).

== Deceased ==
Note: The names are ordered by date of death (descending) as an arbitrary standard.

== Till 350 AH/960 CE ==
Following are ulema (who may or may not be considered maraji) who have spent their major life spans before 350 AH/960 CE:

No.	Image	Name	Year of birth CE AH	Year of death CE AH	Place of birth	Place of education	Place of death	Website	Notes
1	-	Aban - Abu Sa'id Aban ibn Taghlib ibn Rubah al-Bakri al-Jurairi al-Kindi al-Rabie al-Kufi -	- -	758 141	Iraq	Saudi Arabia		Biography	
2	-	Abu Baseer - Yehya Bin al-Qasim al-Hadhdha’ -	- -	- 150	-	-	-	Biography	
3	-	Ibn Muslim - Mohammad bin Muslim -	- -	- -	-	-	-	Biography	
4	-	Zakariya Qummi - Zakariya bin Adam-e-Qummi -	- -	- -	-	-	-	-	
5	-	Yunus - Yunus bin Abdul-Rahman -	- -	825-826 210	-	-	-	-	
6	-	Safwan - Abu Muhammad Safwan ibn Yahya al Bajali Bayya' al-Sabiri -	- -	- -	-	-	-	-	
7	-	Abu Umayr - Muhammad bin Abu-Umayr -	- -	- -	-	-	-	-	
8	-	Mughirah - Abdullah bin al-Mughirah -	- -	- -	-	-	-	-	
9	-	Ali al-Uraydi - علي العريضي Abu Hasan Ali al-Uraidhi ibn Ja'far al-Sadiq -	757- 140-	835+ 220+	Saudi Arabia			Biography	-
10	-	Rad - al-Hassan bin Mahboob al-Rad (or al‑Sarrad or al‑Zarrad) al‑Kufi -	- -	839 224	-	-	-	-	
11	-	Abi-Nasr - Ahmad bin Muhammad bin Abi-Nasr -	- -	- -	-	-	-	-	
12	-	Uthman al-Amri - Uthman ibn Sa’id al-Asadi -	- -	- 267-	-	-	-	-	
13	-	Abū Is’hāq - Abū Is’hāq Ibrāhīm ibn Muhammad ibn Sa’eed ibn Hilāl Thaqafī Isfahānī -	- -	896+ 283	Iraq		Iran	Biography	-
14	-	Ahwāzī - Abū Muhammad Husein ibn Sa’īd ibn Hamād ibn Mehrān Ahwāzī -	-	896+ 283+	Iraq		Iran	Biography	
15	-	Mohammad al-Amri - Mohammad bin Saeed al-Amri -	- -	- 305	-	-	-	-	
16	-	Ummani - al-Hasan ibn 'Ali ibn Abi `Aqil al-`Ummani -	- -	941 329	-	-	-	-	
17	-	Qummi - قمي Ali ibn Babawayh al-Qummi علي بن القمي	- -	941 329	-	-	-	-	
18	-	Kulayni - الكليني Muhammad ibn Ya'qub al-Kulayni محمد بن يعقوب الكليني	864 250	941 329	Iran	Iraq		Biography 1, Biography 2	
19	-	Iskāfī - Abū Alī Muhammad ibn Humām ibn Suhail Iskāfī -	872 258	947 336	Iraq	Iraq		Biography	-

== 351 AH/961 CE to 1200 AH/1785 CE ==
Following are ulema who have spent their major life span between 350 AH/961 CE & 1200 AH/1785 CE:

No.	Image	Name	Year of birth CE AH	Year of death CE AH	Place of birth	Place of education	Place of death	Website	Notes
1	-	Ibn-e Qūliwayh - Sheikh Abul-Qāsim Ja’far ibn Muhammad son of Ja’far ibn Mūsā ibn Masrūr ibn Qūliwayh-e Qummī -	- -	977 367	Iran			Biography	-
2	-	Ayyashi - عياشي Ayyashi al-Samarqandi عياشي السمرقندي	- -	978 368	-	-	-	-	
3	-	Abū Ghālib Zurārī Ahmad ibn Muhammad ibn Muhammad ibn Suleimān ibn Hasan ibn Jahm ibn Bukair ibn A’yun Shaybānī Kūfī Baghdadi -	898 285	978 368	Iraq			Biography	-
4	-	Shaykh Saduq - شيخ صدوق Abu Jafar Muhammad ibn Ali ibn Babawayh al-Qummi أبو جعفر محمد ابن علي ابن بابويه القمي	918 305	991 380	Iran	Iraq	Iran	-	-
5	-	Iskafi - Ibn Junayd al-Iskafi -	- -	991 381	-	-	-	-	
6	-	Saheb, Al Kafat - صاحب Ismail ibne Ibad صاحب بن عباد	- -	995 384	Iran			Biography	
7	-	Al-Sharif al-Radi or Razi - الرضي Sayyid al-Razi الشريف الرضي	970 359	1015 406	Iraq			-	
8	-	Shaykh Mufid - شيخ مفيد Abu Abdullah Muhammad ibn Muhammad ibn al-Nu'man al-'Ukbari al-Baghdadi أبو عبد الله محمد بن محمد بن النعمان البغدادي	948 336	1022 413	Iraq			-	
9		Ibn Sīnā - ابن سینا Abū ‘Alī al-Ḥusayn ibn ‘Abd Allāh ibn Sīnā -	980 Safar 370	1037 4 Ramadan 428	Iran			Biography	-
10	-	Sayyid Murtadhā - سيد مرتضى Abu al-Qāsim ‘Alī ibn Husayn al-Syyid al-Murtadhā Alam al-Huda أبو القاسم علي بن الحسين السيد المرتضى علم الهدى	965 355	1044 436	-	-	-	-	
11	-	Halabi - حلبي Abu al-Salah al-Halabi أبو الصلاح الحلبي	- -	1055 447	-	-	-	-	
12	-	Najjashi - النجاشي Ahmad ibn Ali al-Najjashi احمد بن علي النجاشي	982 372	1058 450	-	-	-		
13	-	Shaykh Tusi - شیخ طوسی Abu Jafar Muhammad ibn Hasan Tusi ابوجعفر محمد بن حسن طوسی	995 385	1067 460	-	-	-		
14	-	Ibn Barraj - بن براج Qazi Abdul-Aziz al-Halabi قاضي عبد العزيز الحلبي	- -	1088 481	-	-	-		
15	-	Hākim Haskāni, Ibn-e-Haddād - Qāzi Hākim AbulQāsīm Ubeidullāh Ibn Abdullāh Ibn Ahmad Ibn Muhammad Ibn Ahmad Ibn Muhammad Ibn Haskāni Qurashī Āmirī Neishābūrī	- -	1097 490	-	-	-	Biography	-
16	-	Allamah Tabarsi - العلامة الطبرسي Amin al-Islam Abu Ali Fadal ibn Hassan ibn al-Fadl al-Tabarsi أمين الإسلام الطبرسي	1073 468	1153 548	-	-	-	Biography	
17	-	Rawandi Qutubuddin Rawandi -	- -	1177 573	-	-	-	-	
18	-	Ibne Ashob Ibne Shahr Ashob -	- -	1192 603	-	-	-	-	
19	-	Hilli Muhammad Ibn Idrees Hilli -	1148 543	1202 598	Iraq			Biography	
20	-	KASHMIRI Sayyed Hussain Qummi			Iran		India		
21	-	Muntajabuddīn Muntajabuddīn Alī Ibn Ubaidullāh Ibn Hasan Ibn Bābiwayh Qummī -	- 504	1204 600	Iran			Biography	-
21	-	Ibn Taoos Syed Razi Al Deen Abul Qasim Ali Ibn Moosa Ibn Jafar Ibn Taoos -	1193 5 Muharram 579	1266 664	Iraq			Biography	
22	-	Nasiruddin Toosi Khwajah Nasiruddin Toosi -	1201 597	1274 673	-	-	-	-	
23	-	Ghayas ud Deen Syed Abd al Karim Ibn Jamal ud Deen Ahmed Ibn Moosa Ibn Jafar ibn Taoos -	1250 648	1294 693	-	-	-	Biography	-
24	-	Muhaqqiq al-Hilli Jafar ibne Yahya ibn Hasan ibne Saeed -	1205 603	1277 676	-	-	-	Biography	-
25	-	Irbeli Abul Hasan Ali ibne Isā ibne Abulfath Irbeli -	- -	1294 693	-	-	-	Biography	-
26	-	Allamah Hilli Abu Mafsoor Hasan ibn Yusuf ibne Ali ibn Mazaher -	1250 19 Ramadan 648	1325 11 Muharram 726	-	-	-	Biography	
27	-	Mahaqqeqeen Hilli Fakhrul Mahaqqeqeen Hilli -	- -	1368 771	-	-	-	Biography	
28	-	Muhammad ibn Makki Abu Abd Allah Shams ud Deen Mohammed ibn Jamal ud Deen Makki -	1334 734	1385 786	Lebanon	Saudi Arabia	Syria	-	
29	-	Miqdad Fazil Miqdad -	- -	1423 826	-	-	-	-	
30	-	Asadi Ahmed bin Fahd Hilli Asadi -	1355 757	1438 841	-	-	-		
31	-	Bayādhi Ali bin Yūnus Nabāti Bayādhi -	1402 804	1472 877	-	-	-	Biography	-
32	-	Kaf’ami Taqiyuddin Ibrahim Kaf’ami -	- -	1500 905	-	-	-	-	
33	-	Muhaqqiq al-Karaki Nuraddin Ali ibn Abdul-Aal al-Karki -	- 870	1533 940	-	-	-	-	
34	-	Shaheed Saani Jamal ud Deen ibn Noor ud Deen Ali ibn Fazil Ahmed ibn jamal ud Deen ibn Taqi ibn Mohammed Saleh -	1505 911	1559 966	Lebanon	Iraq	Saudi Arabia	-	
35	-	Muqaddas Ardebili Mohammed ibn Ahmed Ardebili -	1500 -	1585 Safar 993	Iran	Iraq		Biography	
36	-	Shaheed Salis Qazi Nurullah Shustari -	1549 956	1610 1019	Iran	Iraq	India	-	
37	-	Shaykh Bahai Mohammed bin Hasan al Harthi Jeehi Amili Bahai -	1547 17 Moharram 953	1621 12 Shawwal 1031	Lebanon	Iran		Biography	
38	-	Mulla Sadra Ṣadr ad-Dīn Muḥammad Shīrāzī -	1571/2	1641 1050	-	-	-	-	
39	-	Allameh Majlisi Awwal Mohammad Taqi Majlisi -	- -	1660 1070	-	-	-	-	
40	-	Mulla Mazandarani Saleh Mazandarani -	- -	1675 1086	-	-	-	-	
41	-	Muhaqqiq Sabzwari Muhammad Baqir Sabzwari -	1608 -	1679 1090	-	-	-	-	
42	-	Mulla Faiz Kashani Mohammed Mohsin Faiz Kashani -	1598 1007	1680 1091	Iran			Biography	
43		Muhaqqiq Khwansari Husain Khwansari -	1607 -	1687 1098	-	-	-	-	
44	-	Shaykh Ameli Shaykh Hurr Ameli -	1624 8 Rajab 1033	1693 21 Ramadan 1104	-	-	-	Biography	
45	-	Allamah Bahrani Sayyed Hashim Bahrani -	- -	1696 1107	-	-	-	-	
46		Allamah Majlesi Sani Mohammad Baqir Majlisi -	1628 1037	1699 1111	Iran			Biography	
47	-	Jazaeri Sayyed Ne’matullah Jazaeri -	1640 -	1700 1112	-	-	-	-	
48	-	Aqa Khunsari Jamaluddin Mohammad Khunsari -	- -	1713 1125	-	-	-	-	
49	-	Mirza Afandi Mirza Abdullah Isfahani Afandi -	- -	1718 1130	-	-	-	-	
50	-	Fazil-e-Hindi Muhammad Bahauddin Fazil bin Hasan bin Muhammad Isfahani -	- 1062	1725 1137	-	-	-	Biography	
51	-	Sahib Hadaeq Yusuf bin Ahmed -	- -	1772 1186	-	-	-	-	
52	-	Wahid Al-Bihbahani Muhammad Baqir bin Muhammad Akmal -	1706 1118	1791 1206	-	-	-	-	
53	-	Mulla Naraqi Mohammad Mahdee Naraqi -	1715 1128	1795 1209	Iran			Biography	
54	-	Allamah Bahrul Uloom Sayyed Mohammad Mahdi Bahrul Uloom -	1742 Shawwal 1155	1797 1212	Iraq			Biography	

== Between 1201 AH/1786 CE and 1300 AH/1883 CE ==
Following are ulema (who may or may not be considered maraji) who have spent their major life span after 1201 AH/1785 CE & 1300 AH/1883 CE:

No.	Image	Name	Year of birth	Year of death	Place of birth	Place of education	Place of death	Website	Notes
1	-	Ayatullah Ameli Sayyed Jawad Husainee Ameli		1811 1226				-	
2	-	Ayatullah Kashifal Ghita Shaikh Ja’far Kashifal Ghita		1813 1228				-	
3	-	Mirza-ye Qomi Mirza Abolghasem Gilani	1739	1815 1231					
4	-	Tabatabai Sayyed Ali Tabatabai		1816 1231					
5	-	Ghufraan Ma'ab - غفران ماب Syed Dildar Ali Naqvi Naseerabadi سيد دلدار على نصيرابادى	1753 17 Rabi-us-sani 1166	10 January 1820 19 Rajab-ul-Murajjab 1235	India	India - Iran - Iraq	India	Biography 1, Biography 2	-
6	-	Ayatullah Mujahid Sayyed Mohammad Mujahid		1827 1242					
7	-	Mulla Naraqi II Mulla Ahmad Naraqi	1771 1185	1829 1245	Iran			Biography	-
8	-	Shabbar Sayyed Abdullah Shabbar		1827 1242					
9	-	Mirza Mujtahid Mirza Maseeh Mujtahid		1830 1245					
10	-	Shafti Sayyed Mohammad Baqir Shafti		1844 1260	Iran	Iraq	Iran	Biography	
11	-	Mulla Barghani Mohammad Taqi Barghani		25 October 1847 1264					
12	-	Sadr al-Din Sadr al-Din bin Saleh	1779 1194	1848 1264	Lebanon	Iraq	Iran		-
13		Saheb e Jawahir - Najafi Sheikh Muhammad Hassan Najafi	1785 1200	1850 1265	Iraq			-	
14		Shaikh Ansari Murtaza bin Muhammad Amin Ansari -	1799 1214	1864 1282	Iran	Iraq		Biography	
15	-	Aalam-ul-ulama Sayyed Sibt-e-Hussain		1868 1952					
16		Mulla Sabzavari Hadi Sabzewari		1873 1289	Iran				
17		Mulla Keni Ali Keni		1888 1306					
18	-	Meer Husain Meer Hamid Husain Musavi		1888 1306					
19	-	Mulla Hamadani Husain Quli Hamadani		1893 1311					
20		Mirzaye Shirazi Sayyed Mohammad Hassan Shirazi		1895 1312	Iran	Iraq			
21	-	Mirza Rashti Mirza Habibullah Rashti		1894 1312	Iran	Iraq			
22	-	Abul Hasan Kashmiri Allama Abul Hasan Rizvi Kashmiri Lakhnawi		1313	India	India- Iraq	Iraq		
23		Mirza Jilweh Mirza Abul Hasan Jilweh		1896 1314	Iran				
24		Allamah Ashrafi Mulla Muhammad Ashrafi	1804 1219	1898 1315	Iran	Iran - Iraq	Iran	ويكي	
25		Allamah Assadabadi Sayyed Jamaluddin Assadabadi		1897 1314					

== Between 1900-1980 CE (1318-1400 AH) ==
Following are ulema (who may or may not be considered maraji) who have spent their major life span after 1301 AH/1884 CE to 1400 AH/1980 CE:

No.	Image	Name	Year of birth	Year of death	Place of birth	Place of death	Notes
1		Mirza Mohammad Hasan Ashtiyani میرزا محمدحسن آشتیانی	1832	1901 (aged 68–69)	(Qajar Iran) Ashtian, Sublime State of Persia	(Qajar Iran) Tehran, Sublime State of Persia	
2		Mirza Muhammad Baqir Sharif Tabatabaei میرزا محمدباقر شریف طباطبایی	14 October 1823	5 November 1901 (aged 78)	(Qajar Iran) Isfahan, Sublime State of Persia	(Qajar Iran) Jandagh, Sublime State of Persia	-
3		Mirza Husain Noori Tabarsi میرزا حسین نوری طبرسی	1839	1902 (aged 63–64)	(Qajar Iran) Pichdeh, Sublime State of Persia	(Ottoman Empire) Najaf, Baghdad vilayet	Biography
4		Aqa Reza Hamedani آقا رضا همدانی	1834	1904 (aged 69–70)	(Qajar Iran) Sublime State of Persia	(Ottoman Empire) Baghdad vilayet	
5		Mohammad Taha Najafi محمد طه نجف	1825	1905 (aged 79–80)	(Ottoman Empire) Najaf, Baghdad Eyalet	(Ottoman Empire) Najaf, Baghdad vilayet	
6		Sayed Murtaza Razavi Kashmiri سیدمرتضی رضوی کشمیری	1851	1905 (aged 53–54)	(British Raj) British India	(Ottoman Empire) Baghdad vilayet	
7		Sheikh Mohammad Behari شیخ محمد بهاری	1849	1907 (aged 57–58)	(Qajar Iran) Bahar, Sublime State of Persia		
8		Mohammad Bagher Estahbanati محمد باقر اصطهباناتی	1837	8 March 1908 (aged 70–71)	(Qajar Iran) Estahban, Sublime State of Persia	(Qajar Iran) Shiraz, Sublime State of Persia	-
9		Mirza Hossein Khalili Tehrani میرزا حسین خلیلی تهرانی	1815	4 November 1908 (aged 92–93)	(Ottoman Empire) Najaf, Baghdad Eyalet	(Ottoman Empire) Najaf, Baghdad vilayet	
10		Sheikh Fazlullah Nouri شيخ فضل‌الله نوری	24 December 1843	31 July 1909 (aged 65)	(Qajar Iran) Mazandaran, Sublime State of Persia	(Qajar Iran) Tehran, Sublime State of Persia	
11		Seyyed Abdollah Behbahani سیدعبدالله بهبهانی	1840	15 July 1910 (aged 69–70)	(Ottoman Empire) Najaf, Baghdad Eyalet	(Qajar Iran) Tehran, Sublime State of Persia	-
12		Hakeem Mirza Jahangir Khan Qashqai حکیم میرزاجهانگیرخان قشقایی	1827	16 September 1910 (aged 82–83)	(Qajar Iran) Kezen, Sublime State of Persia	(Qajar Iran) Isfahan, Sublime State of Persia	
13		Mirza Abutaleb Zanjani میرزا ابوطالب زنجانی	10 December 1843	16 March 1911 (aged 67)	(Qajar Iran) Zanjan, Sublime State of Persia	(Qajar Iran) Tehran, Sublime State of Persia	
14		Mola Muhammad Kazim Khurasani ملا محمد کاظم خراسانی	1839	12 December 1911 (aged 71–72)	(Qajar Iran) Mashhad, Sublime State of Persia	(Ottoman Empire) Najaf, Baghdad vilayet	
15		Allameh Ali Asghar Mazandarani علامه علی‌اصغر مازندرانی	1826	1911 (aged 84–85)	(Qajar Iran) Amirkola, Sublime State of Persia		-
16		Abdallah Mazandarani عبدالله مازندرانی	1840	21 October 1912 (aged 71–72)	(Qajar Iran) Amol, Sublime State of Persia	(Ottoman Empire) Najaf, Baghdad vilayet	-
17		Sheikh Reza Tabrizi آقا رضا تبریزی	1848	1912 (aged 63–64)	(Qajar Iran) Sublime State of Persia	(Ottoman Empire) Baghdad vilayet	Biography in Arabic
18		Seyed Ahmad Karbala'i Tehrani سید احمد کربلایی تهرانی	1864	1913 (aged 48–49)	(Ottoman Empire) Baghdad vilayet		Biography in Farsi
19		Haj Sheikh Mohammad Baqer Behari Hamedani حاج شیخ محمّد باقر بهاری همدانی	1859	1914 (aged 54–55)	(Qajar Iran) Bahar, Sublime State of Persia	(Qajar Iran) Hamadan, Sublime State of Persia	
20		Akhund Mullah Mohammad Kashani آخوند ملا محمد کاشانی	1834	3 July 1915 (aged 80–81)	(Qajar Iran) Kashan, Sublime State of Persia	(Qajar Iran) Isfahan, Sublime State of Persia	-
21		Mohammad Ali Rashti محمدعلی رشتی	1836	1915 (aged 78–79)	(Qajar Iran) Sublime State of Persia		-
22		Sayyed Mohammad Kazim Tabatabai Yazdi سید محمدکاظم طباطبایی یزدی	1831	28 April 1919 (aged 87–88)	(Qajar Iran) Yazd, Sublime State of Persia	(Kingdom of Iraq) Najaf, Mandatory Iraq	
23		Sayyid Ismail as-Sadr السيد إسماعيل الصدر	1842	29 August 1919 (aged 76–77)	(Qajar Iran) Isfahan, Sublime State of Persia	(Kingdom of Iraq) Najaf, Mandatory Iraq	
24		Mirza Sayyed Mohammad Tabatabai میرزا سید محمد طباطبائی	22 December 1842	28 January 1920 (aged 77)	(Ottoman Empire) Karbala, Baghdad Eyalet	(Kingdom of Iraq) Karbala, Mandatory Iraq	-
25		Mirza Muhammad-Taqi Golshan Shirazi Ha'eri ميرزا محمدتقى گلشن شيرازى حائرى	1840	28 August 1920 (aged 79–80)	(Qajar Iran) Shiraz, Sublime State of Persia	(Kingdom of Iraq) Karbala, Mandatory Iraq	
26		Mulla Fathullah Qaravi Shirazi Esfahani فتح‌الله غروی اصفهانی	25 January 1850	18 December 1920 (aged 70)	(Qajar Iran) Isfahan, Sublime State of Persia	(Kingdom of Iraq) Najaf, Mandatory Iraq	
27		Mulla Habibullah Shareef Kashani ملا حبیب‌الله شریف کاشانی	1846	19 February 1922 (aged 75–76)	(Qajar Iran) Kashan, Sublime State of Persia		
28		Aqa Nuruddin Nori Iraqi آقانورالدین نوری عراقی	1862	10 January 1923 (aged 60–61)	(Qajar Iran) Arak, Sublime State of Persia		
29		Seyed Mohammad Baqir Durcheye سید محمدباقر درچه‌ای	1854	4 December 1923 (aged 68–69)	(Qajar Iran) Dorcheh, Sublime State of Persia		
30		Seyyed Abd al-Husayn Mousavi Dezfuli Najafi Lari سید عبدالحسین موسوی دزفولی نجفی لاری	10 January 1848	9 May 1924 (aged 76)	(Qajar Iran) Dezful, Sublime State of Persia	(Qajar Iran) Jahrom, Sublime State of Persia	
31		Mohammad Khalissi Zadeh محمد خالصی‌زاده	1868	25 February 1925 (aged 56–57)	(Ottoman Empire) Kadhimiya, Baghdad vilayet	(Pahlavi Iran) Mashhad, Imperial State of Iran	
32		Mirza Jawad Agha Maleki Tabrizi میرزا جواد آقا ملکی تبریزی	1857	3 July 1925 (aged 67–68)	(Qajar Iran) Tabriz, Sublime State of Persia	(Pahlavi Iran) Qom, Imperial State of Iran	Biography
33		Haj Aqa Nourollah Esfahani حاج آقا نورالله نجفی اصفهانی	1859	1927 (aged 67–68)	(Qajar Iran) Isfahan, Sublime State of Persia	(Pahlavi Iran) Qom, Imperial State of Iran	
34		Mohammad Baqer Rizvi Lakhnawi محمد باقر رضوی لکهنو		1928	(British Raj) British India	(Kingdom of Iraq) Mandatory Iraq	
35		Movlazada Mahammad Hasan Ismayil oglu Shakavi; Mövlazadə Məhəmməd Həsən Ismayıl oğlu Şəkəvi محمد مولازاده حسن اسماعیل اوغلۇ شکوی	1854	1932 (aged 77–78)	Shaki, Russian Empire	Tbilisi, Russian Empire	-
36		Sheikh Mohammad Jawad al-Balaghi al-Najafi الشيخ محمد جواد البلاغي النجفي	1865	10 December 1933 (aged 67–68)	(Ottoman Empire) Najaf, Baghdad vilayet	(Kingdom of Iraq) Najaf, Mandatory Iraq	
37		Sayyed Musa Zarabadi Qazwini سید موسی زرآبادی قزوینی	1877	15 July 1934 (aged 56–57)	(Qajar Iran) Qazvin, Sublime State of Persia	(Pahlavi Iran) Qazvin, Imperial State of Iran	
38		Seyyed Abul Qasim Hosseini Najafi Dehkurdi سید ابوالقاسم حسینی نجفی دهکردی	1855	12 January 1935 (aged 79–80)	(Qajar Iran) Dehkord, Sublime State of Persia	(Pahlavi Iran) Isfahan, Imperial State of Iran	
39		Seyed Hasan Sadr سید حسن صدر	2 June 1856	12 June 1935 (aged 79)	(Ottoman Empire) Kadhimiya, Baghdad Eyalet	Kadhimiya, Kingdom of Iraq	
40		Mirza Mohammad Hussain Naini میرزا محمدحسین نائینی	25 May 1860	14 August 1936 (aged 76)	(Qajar Iran) Nain, Sublime State of Persia	Najaf, Kingdom of Iraq	Biography
41		Abdolkarim Haeri Yazdi عبدالکریم حائری یزدی	1859	30 January 1937 (aged 77–78)	(Qajar Iran) Meybod, Sublime State of Persia	(Pahlavi Iran) Qom, Imperial State of Iran	Biography
42		Seyyed Hassan Modarres سید حسن مدرس	1870	1 December 1937 (aged 66–67)	(Qajar Iran) Sarabeh, Sublime State of Persia	(Pahlavi Iran) Kashmar, Imperial State of Iran	
43		al-Sayyid Haydar al-Sadr السید حيدر الصدر	1891	1937 (aged 45–46)	(Ottoman Empire) Samarra, Baghdad vilayet	Kadhimiya, Kingdom of Iraq	-
44		Abbas Mohaddith Qomi عباس محدث قمی	1877	21 January 1941 (aged 63–64)	(Qajar Iran) Qom, Sublime State of Persia	Najaf, Kingdom of Iraq	Biography
45		Hassan Ali Nokhodaki Isfahani حسنعلی نخودکی اصفهانی	4 May 1863	29 August 1942 (aged 79)	(Qajar Iran) Isfahan, Sublime State of Persia	(Pahlavi Iran) Mashhad, Imperial State of Iran	Biography
46		Aqa Ziyauddin Araki آقا ضیاءالدین عراقی	1861	7 December 1942 (aged 80–81)	(Qajar Iran) Arak, Sublime State of Persia	Najaf, Kingdom of Iraq	
47		Mohammad Hossein Gharavi Esfahani محمد حسين الغروي الأصفهاني	18 December 1878	14 December 1942 (aged 63)	(Ottoman Empire) Kadhimiya, Baghdad vilayet	Najaf, Kingdom of Iraq	-
48		Sayyid Mohammad Taqi Ibn Sayyid Morteza al-Mosawi Mofti al-Shia السيّد محمّد تقي ابن السيّد مرتضى الموسوي مفتي الشيعة	1865	14 December 1942 (aged 76–77)	(Qajar Iran) Sublime State of Persia	Kingdom of Iraq	
49		Mohammad Nezam Al Olama Estahbanati محمدنظام العلما اصطهباناتی	6 January 1849	20 December 1942 (aged 93)	(Qajar Iran) Estahban, Sublime State of Persia	(Pahlavi Iran) Estahban, Imperial State of Iran	-
50		Seyed Mohammad Hassan Hosseini Quchani سید محمد حسن حسینی قوچانی	1878	28 April 1944 (aged 65–66)	(Qajar Iran) Khosraviyeh, Sublime State of Persia	(Pahlavi Iran) Quchan, Imperial State of Iran	-
51		Seyed Mohammad Mahdi Durcheye سید محمدمهدی درچه ای	1862	22 February 1945 (aged 82–83)	(Qajar Iran) Dorcheh, Sublime State of Persia	(Pahlavi Iran) Imperial State of Iran	
52		Sayyed Abu I-Hassan Mosawi al-Isfahani سید ابوالحسن موسوی اصفهانی	1861	4 November 1946 (aged 84–85)	(Qajar Iran) Isfahan, Sublime State of Persia	Kadhimiya, Kingdom of Iraq	Biography
53		Mirza Mohammad Mahdi Gharavi Esfahani Khorasani میرزا محمد مهدی غروی اصفهانی خراسانی	1886	12 November 1946 (aged 59–60)	(Qajar Iran) Isfahan, Sublime State of Persia	(Pahlavi Iran) Mashhad, Imperial State of Iran	
54		Allameh Sayyed Ali Aqa Qazi Tabatabaei Tabrizi علامه سید علی آقا قاضی طباطبایی تبریزی	29 April 1866	28 January 1947 (aged 80)	(Qajar Iran) Tabriz, Sublime State of Persia	Najaf, Kingdom of Iraq	-
55		Seyed Hossein Tabatabaei Qomi سید حسین طباطبایی قمی	17 December 1865	7 March 1947 (aged 81)	(Qajar Iran) Qom, Sublime State of Persia	Najaf, Kingdom of Iraq	
56		Sheikh Muhammad Kadhim Ibn Haydar al-Shirazi الشيخ محمد كاظم بن حيدر الشيرازي	1875	1947 (aged 71–72)	(Qajar Iran) Shiraz, Sublime State of Persia	Najaf, Kingdom of Iraq	-
57		Mirza Mohammad Ali Shahabadi میرزامحمدعلی شاه‌آبادی	1875	24 November 1949 (aged 73–74)	(Qajar Iran) Isfahan, Sublime State of Persia	(Pahlavi Iran) Tehran, Imperial State of Iran	
58		Sheikh Ali Akbar Nahawandi شیخ علی اکبر نهاوندی	1861	6 February 1950 (aged 88–89)	(Qajar Iran) Sublime State of Persia	(Pahlavi Iran) Imperial State of Iran	
59		Sayyid Mohsin al-Amin al-Ameli السيد محسن الأمين العاملي	1867	29 March 1952 (aged 84–85)	Jabal Amil, Lebanon	Najaf, Kingdom of Iraq	
60		Seyed Mohammad Taqi Mosawi Khonsari سید محمدتقی موسوی خوانساری	1888	27 August 1952 (aged 63–64)	(Qajar Iran) Khansar, Sublime State of Persia	(Pahlavi Iran) Hamadan, Imperial State of Iran	Biography
61		Seyyed Mohammad Hojjat Hossein Kuh-Kamari سید محمد حجت کوه کمره ای	1893	18 January 1953 (aged 60–61)	(Qajar Iran) Tabriz, Sublime State of Persia	(Pahlavi Iran) Qom, Imperial State of Iran	-
62		Sardar Kabuli سردار کابلی	14 February 1876	17 June 1953 (aged 77)	Kabul, Afghanistan	(Pahlavi Iran) Kermanshah, Imperial State of Iran	
63		Sadr al-Din al-Sadr سید صدرالدین صدر	1882	26 November 1953 (aged 70–71)	(Ottoman Empire) Kadhimiya, Baghdad vilayet	(Pahlavi Iran) Qom, Imperial State of Iran	-
64		Sheikh Mohammed Hussain Kashif al-Ghita الشيخ محمد حسين كاشف الغطاء	1877	19 July 1954 (aged 76–77)	(Ottoman Empire) Najaf, Baghdad vilayet	(Pahlavi Iran) Kerend-e Gharb, Imperial State of Iran	Biography
65		Mohammad Hossein Esheni Qudejani محمد حسین اشنی قودجانی	1868	5 May 1956 (aged 87–88)	(Qajar Iran) Qudejan, Sublime State of Persia	(Pahlavi Iran) Isfahan, Imperial State of Iran	-
66		Seyed Jamaluddin Gulpaygani سید جمال‌الدین گلپایگانی	1878	26 August 1957 (aged 78–79)	(Qajar Iran) Saidabad, Sublime State of Persia	(Pahlavi Iran) Golpayegan, Imperial State of Iran	
67		Abd al-Husayn Sharaf al-Din al-Musawi عبدالحسين شرف الدين الموسوي	1872	31 December 1957 (aged 85)	(Ottoman Empire) Najaf, Baghdad vilayet	Tyre, Lebanon	
68		Mirza Mahdi al-Hosseini al-Shirazi الميرزا مهدي الحسيني الشيرازي	8 May 1887	14 February 1961 (aged 73)	(Ottoman Empire) Karbala, Baghdad vilayet	(First Republic of Iraq) Karbala, Iraqi Republic (1958–1968)	Biography
69		Seyyed Husayn Tabatabaei Burujardi سید حسین طباطبایی بروجردی	23 March 1875	30 March 1961 (aged 86)	(Qajar Iran) Borujerd, Sublime State of Persia	(Pahlavi Iran) Qom, Imperial State of Iran	Biography
70		Seyyed Abol Qasem Kashani سید ابوالقاسم کاشانی	19 November 1882	14 March 1962 (aged 79)	(Qajar Iran) Tehran, Sublime State of Persia	(Pahlavi Iran) Tehran, Imperial State of Iran	
71		Sayyid Abdul Hadi Hussaini Shirazi السيد عبد الهادي الحسيني الشيرازي	1888	13 July 1962 (aged 73–74)	(Ottoman Empire) Samarra, Baghdad vilayet	(First Republic of Iraq) Najaf, Iraqi Republic (1958–1968)	-
72		Muhammad Rida al-Muzaffar محمد رضا المُظَفَّر	10 October 1904	30 January 1964 (aged 59)	(Ottoman Empire) Najaf, Baghdad vilayet	(First Republic of Iraq) Najaf, Iraqi Republic (1958–1968)	
73		Seyyed Hibatuddin Shahrestani سید هبة الدین شهرستانی	20 May 1884	7 February 1967 (aged 82)	(Ottoman Empire) Samarra, Baghdad vilayet	(First Republic of Iraq) Baghdad, Iraqi Republic (1958–1968)	
74		Syed Mohsin Nawab Rizvi سید محسن نواب رضوی	14 April 1911	26 August 1969 (aged 58)	(British Raj) Lucknow, British India	Lucknow, India	
75		Agha Bozorg Tehrani آقابزرگ تهرانی	7 April 1876	20 February 1970 (aged 93)	(Qajar Iran) Tehran, Sublime State of Persia	(Ba'athist Iraq) Najaf, Republic of Iraq	
76		Sayyid Mohsin al-Tabatabai al-Hakeem السيد محسن الطبابائي الحكيم	31 May 1889	2 June 1970 (aged 81)	(Ottoman Empire) Najaf, Baghdad vilayet	(Ba'athist Iraq) Najaf, Republic of Iraq	Biography
77		Abdul Hosein Amini عبدالحسین امینی	1902	3 July 1970 (aged 67–68)	(Qajar Iran) Sarab, Sublime State of Persia	(Pahlavi Iran) Tehran, Imperial State of Iran	
78		Seyyed Mohammad Taqi Ghazanfari سید محمدتقی غضنفری	1886	26 March 1971 (aged 84–85)	(Qajar Iran) Khansar, Sublime State of Persia	(Pahlavi Iran) Khansar, Imperial State of Iran	-
79		Sheikh Mohammad Kuhistani شیخ محمد کوهستانی	1888	28 April 1972 (aged 83–84)	(Qajar Iran) Kuhestan, Sublime State of Persia	(Pahlavi Iran) Mashhad, Imperial State of Iran	
80		Mirza Abol Hassan Sharani میرزا ابوالحسن شعرانی	1902	3 November 1973 (aged 70–71)	(Qajar Iran) Tehran, Sublime State of Persia	(Pahlavi Iran) Tehran, Imperial State of Iran	
81		Seyed Mahmood Husseini Shahroudi سید محمود حسینی شاهرودی	1883	5 September 1974 (aged 90–91)	(Qajar Iran) Shahroud, Sublime State of Persia	(Ba'athist Iraq) Najaf, Republic of Iraq	
82		Mir Seyyed Ali Bahbahani میر سید علی بهبهانی	1885	21 November 1975 (aged 89–90)	(Qajar Iran) Behbahan, Sublime State of Persia	(Pahlavi Iran) Ahvaz, Imperial State of Iran	
83		Sayyid Mohammad Hadi al-Milani السيد محمد هادي الحسيني الميلاني	1 July 1895	7 August 1975 (aged 80)	(Ottoman Empire) Najaf, Baghdad vilayet	(Pahlavi Iran) Mashhad, Imperial State of Iran	
84		Haj Aqa Rahim Arbab حاج آقا رحیم ارباب	1880	December 10, 1976 (aged 95–96)	(Qajar Iran) Chermahin, Sublime State of Persia	(Pahlavi Iran) Isfahan, Imperial State of Iran	
85		Noureddin Esheni Qudejani نورالدین اشنی قودجانی	1903	14 October 1978 (aged 74–75)	(Qajar Iran) Eshen, Sublime State of Persia	(Pahlavi Iran) Isfahan, Imperial State of Iran	-
86		Morteza Motahhari مرتضی مطهری	31 January 1919	1 May 1979 (aged 60)	(Qajar Iran) Fariman, Sublime State of Persia	Tehran, Iran	Biography
87		Sayyid Ahmed Ibn Razi al-Musawi al-Tabrizi al-Mustanbit أحمد بن رضي الموسوي التبريزي المستنبط	24 May 1907	31 May 1979 (aged 72)	(Qajar Iran) Tabriz, Sublime State of Persia	(Ba'athist Iraq) Najaf, Republic of Iraq	-
88		Sayyid Muhammad Baqir al-Sadr السيد محمد باقر الصدر	1 March 1935	9 April 1980 (aged 45)	Kadhimiya, Kingdom of Iraq	(Ba'athist Iraq) Baghdad, Republic of Iraq	

== After 1980 CE (1400 AH) ==
Following are ulema (who may or may not be considered maraji) who have spent their major life span after 1400 AH/1980 CE:

No.	Image	Name	Year of birth	Year of death	Place of birth	Place of death	Notes
1		Mir Asadollah Madani میر اسدالله مدنی	1914	11 September 1981 (aged 66–67)	(Qajar Iran) Azarshahr, Sublime State of Persia	Tabriz, Iran	
2		Sayyid Muhammad Husayn Tabataba'i سید محمد حسین طباطبائی	16 March 1903	15 November 1981 (aged 78)	(Qajar Iran) Tabriz, Sublime State of Persia	Qom, Iran	Official website Biography
3		Seyed Abdol Hossein Dastgheib Shirazi سید عبدالحسین دستغیب شیرازی	8 December 1913	11 December 1981 (aged 68)	(Qajar Iran) Shiraz, Sublime State of Persia	Shiraz, Iran	Biography 1, Biography 2
4		Seyed Abdollah Musawi Shirazi سید عبدالله موسوی شیرازی	25 February 1892	29 September 1984 (aged 92)	(Qajar Iran) Shiraz, Sublime State of Persia	Mashhad, Iran	
5		Seyed Ahmad Khonsari سید احمد خوانساری	24 August 1891	20 January 1985 (aged 93)	(Qajar Iran) Khansar, Sublime State of Persia	Tehran, Iran	-
6		Mohammad-Taher Shubayr al-Khaqani محمد طاهر شبير الخاقاني	30 November 1911	28 January 1986 (aged 74)	(Qajar Iran) Ahwaz, Sublime State of Persia	Qom, Iran	-
7		Seyed Mohammad Kazem Shariatmadari سید محمدکاظم شریعتمداری	5 January 1906	3 April 1986 (aged 80)	(Qajar Iran) Tabriz, Sublime State of Persia	Tehran, Iran	
8		Seyed Ali Naqi Naqvi سید علی‌نقی نقوی	26 December 1905	18 May 1988 (aged 82)	(British Raj) Lucknow, British India	Lucknow, India	
9		Seyed Ruhollah Mousavi Khomeini سيد روح الله موسوی خمینی	17 May 1900	3 June 1989 (aged 89)	(Qajar Iran) Khomeyn, Sublime State of Persia	Tehran, Iran	
10		Sayyid Shahab ud-Din Mar'ashi Najafi سید شهاب‌الدین مرعشی نجفی	21 July 1897	29 August 1990 (aged 93)	(Ottoman Empire) Najaf, Baghdad vilayet	Qom, Iran	Biography
11		Seyed Abul Qasim Musawi Khoei سيد ابولقاسم موسوي الخوئي	19 November 1899	8 August 1992 (aged 92)	(Qajar Iran) Khoy, Sublime State of Persia	(Ba'athist Iraq) Kufa, Republic of Iraq	Official website Biography
12		Mirza Hashem Amoli Larijani میرزا هاشم آملی لاریجانی	26 February 1899	25 February 1993 (aged 93)	(Qajar Iran) Larijan Sublime State of Persia	Qom, Iran	-
13		Seyed Abd al-A'la al-Sabziwari سید عبدالاعلی سبزواری	21 December 1910	16 August 1993 (aged 82)	(Qajar Iran) Sabzevar, Sublime State of Persia	(Ba'athist Iraq) Najaf, Republic of Iraq	-
14		Seyed Mohammad Reza Golpaygani سید محمدرضا گلپایگانی	20 March 1899	9 December 1993 (aged 94)	(Qajar Iran) Isfahan, Sublime State of Persia	Qom, Iran	Biography 1, Biography 2
15		Mirza Ali Akbar Marandi میرزا علی اکبر مرندی	1897	29 March 1994 (aged 96–97)	(Qajar Iran) Tabriz, Sublime State of Persia	Marand, Iran	
16		Mohammad Ali Araki محمدعلی اراکی	22 December 1894	24 November 1994 (aged 99)	(Qajar Iran) Arak, Sublime State of Persia	Qom, Iran	Biography
17		Mohammad-Taqi Shoushtari محمد تقی شوشتری	1903	19 May 1995 (aged 91–92)	(Ottoman Empire) Najaf, Baghdad vilayet	Shushtar, Iran	
18		Seyed Reza Bahaadini سید رضا بهاءالدینی	29 March 1908	19 July 1997 (aged 89)	(Qajar Iran) Qom, Sublime State of Persia	Qom, Iran	Biography
19		Seyed Mohammad Rohani سید محمد روحانی	11 May 1920	21 August 1997 (aged 77)	(Qajar Iran) Qom, Sublime State of Persia	Qom, Iran	-
20		Ali Gharavi علي الغروي	1931	18 June 1998 (aged 66–67)	(Pahlavi Iran) Tabriz, Imperial State of Iran	(Ba'athist Iraq) Karbala, Republic of Iraq	-
21		Allameh Mohammad-Taqi Ja'fari علامه محمد تقی جعفری	15 August 1925	16 November 1998 (aged 73)	(Pahlavi Iran) Tabriz, Imperial State of Iran	London, United Kingdom	Official website
22		Ahmad Bigdeli Azari-Qomi احمد بیگدلی آذری قمی	1924	31 January 1999 (aged 74–75)	(Qajar Iran) Qom, Sublime State of Persia	Tehran, Iran	-
23		Mohammad Sadeq al-Sadr مُحمّد صادق الصدر	23 February 1943	19 February 1999 (aged 55)	Kadhimiya, Kingdom of Iraq	(Ba'athist Iraq) Najaf, Republic of Iraq	
24		Seyed Mohammad Hussaini Shirazi سید محمد حسینی شیرازی	31 August 1928	17 December 2001 (aged 73)	(Kingdom of Iraq) Najaf, Mandatory Iraq	Qom, Iran	Official website
25		Seyed Muhammad Ali Movahed Abtahi سید محمدعلی موحد ابطحی	1930	20 September 2002 (aged 71–72)	(Pahlavi Iran) Isfahan, Imperial State of Iran	Tehran, Iran	-
26		Mohammad Taqi Bahlool محمدتقی بهلول	17 June 1910	29 July 2005 (aged 95)	(Qajar Iran) Gonabad, Sublime State of Persia	Tehran, Iran	Biography 1, Biography 2
27		Seyed Abolqasem Kokabi سید ابوالقاسم کوکبی	1926	20 December 2005 (aged 78–79)	(Pahlavi Iran) Tabriz, Imperial State of Iran	Qom, Iran	-
28		Mirza Javad Tabrizi ميرزا جواد تبريزى	1926	20 November 2006 (aged 79–80)	(Pahlavi Iran) Tabriz, Imperial State of Iran	Qom, Iran	Official website
29		Seyed Hassan Tabatabaei Qomi سید حسن طباطبایی قمی	1912	7 June 2007 (aged 94–95)	(Qajar Iran) Mashhad, Sublime State of Persia	Karaj, Iran	-
30		Mohammad Fazel Lankarani محمد فاضل لنکرانی	1931	16 June 2007 (aged 75–76)	(Pahlavi Iran) Qom, Imperial State of Iran	Qom, Iran	Official website Biography
31		Mohammad-Taqi Bahjat Foumani محمدتقی بهجت فومنی	24 August 1916	17 May 2009 (aged 92)	(Qajar Iran) Fouman, Sublime State of Persia	Qom, Iran	Official website
32		Hussein-Ali Montazeri حسینعلی منتظری	24 September 1922	19 December 2009 (aged 87)	(Qajar Iran) Najafabad, Sublime State of Persia	Qom, Iran	Official website
33		Ali Safi Golpaygani علی صافی گلپایگانی	1913	3 January 2010 (aged 96–97)	(Qajar Iran) Golpayegan, Sublime State of Persia	Golpayegan, Iran	-
34		Sayyid Mohammad Mofti al-shia Mousavi السيد محمد مفتي الشيعة موسوي	1928	19 May 2010 (aged 81–82)	(Pahlavi Iran) Ardabil, Imperial State of Iran	Qom, Iran	Official Website
35		Sayyid Mohammad Hussein Fadlallah السيد محمد حسين فضل الله	16 November 1935	4 July 2010 (aged 74)	Najaf, Kingdom of Iraq	Beirut, Lebanon	Official Website
36		Sayyid Abbas Hosseini Kashani السید عباس حسيني کاشانی	1931	18 July 2010 (aged 78–79)	(Kingdom of Iraq) Karbala, Mandatory Iraq	Iran	Official Website
37		Mirza Mohammad Hassan Ahmadi Faqih ميرزا محمد حسن احمدى فقيه	1951	29 August 2010 (aged 58–59)	(Pahlavi Iran) Yazd, Imperial State of Iran	Yazd, Iran	Official Website
38		Mohammad Ebrahim Ansari محمد إبراهيم الأنصاري	1936	19 February 2011 (aged 74–75)	Kingdom of Iraq	Iraq	Biography
39		Mohammad Sadeqi Tehrani محمد صادقی تهرانی	21 March 1926	21 March 2011 (aged 85)	(Pahlavi Iran) Tehran, Imperial State of Iran	Qom, Iran	Official Website
40		Mohsen Koochebaghi Tabrizi محسن کوچه باغی تبریزی	9 January 1924	3 August 2011 (aged 87)	(Qajar Iran) Tabriz, Sublime State of Persia	Tabriz, Iran	Official Website
41		Mojtaba Tehrani مجتبي تهراني	30 March 1937	2 January 2013 (aged 75)	(Pahlavi Iran) Tehran, Imperial State of Iran	Tehran, Iran	Official Website
42		Seyed Mohammad Ezodin Hosseini Zanjani سید محمد عزالدین حسيني زنجانی	1 February 1921	14 May 2013 (aged 92)	(Qajar Iran) Zanjan, Sublime State of Persia	Mashhad, Iran	Official Website
43		Seyed Yousef Madani Tabrizi سيد يوسف مدنی تبریزی	1928	16 June 2013 (aged 84–85)	(Pahlavi Iran) Tabriz, Imperial State of Iran	Qom, Iran	Official Website
44		Moslem Malakouti مسلم ملكوتی	5 June 1924	24 April 2014 (aged 89)	(Qajar Iran) Sarab, Sublime State of Persia	Tehran, Iran	Official Website
45		Sayyid Mohammad Baqer Mosawi Shirazi سید محمدباقر موسوی شیرازی	26 November 1931	13 May 2014 (aged 82)	(Pahlavi Iran) Shiraz, Imperial State of Iran	Tehran, Iran	Official Website
46		Sayyid Morteza Hosseini Fayaz السيد مرتضى الحسيني فياض	9 April 1929	20 August 2014 (aged 85)	(Kingdom of Iraq) Najaf, Mandatory Iraq	Iraq	Biography
47		Seyed Mohammad Bagher Movahed Abtahi سید محمدباقر موحد ابطحی	1928	5 February 2014 (aged 85–86)	(Pahlavi Iran) Isfahan, Imperial State of Iran	Tehran, Iran	-
48		Abdol Hamid Sharbiani عبدالحمید شربیانی	1927	22 September 2015 (aged 87–88)	(Pahlavi Iran) Imperial State of Iran	Iran	
49		Seyed Taqi Tabatabaei Qomi سید تقی طباطبایی قمی	21 February 1923	26 October 2016 (aged 93)	(Qajar Iran) Mashhad, Sublime State of Persia	Karbala, Iraq	-
50		Seyed Abdol Karim Mousavi Ardebili سید عبدالکریم موسوی اردبیلی	26 January 1926	23 November 2016 (aged 90)	(Pahlavi Iran) Ardabil, Imperial State of Iran	Tehran, Iran	Official Website
51		Seyed Javad Fatemi Tabrizi سید جواد فاطمی تبریزی	25 September 1923	8 January 2017 (aged 93)	(Qajar Iran) Sublime State of Persia	Iran	Official Website
52		Sayyid Mohammad Ali Tabatabaei Hassani السيد محمد علي الطباطبائي الحسني	22 August 1945	1 February 2017 (aged 71)	Karbala, Kingdom of Iraq	London, United Kingdom	Official Website
53		Hossein Rasti Kashani حسین راستی کاشانی	1927	20 September 2017 (aged 89–90)	(Pahlavi Iran) Kashan, Imperial State of Iran	Tehran, Iran	
54		Morteza Tehrani مرتضی تهرانی	1933	21 July 2018 (aged 84–85)	(Pahlavi Iran) Tehran, Imperial State of Iran	Mashhad, Iran	Official Website
55		Mohammad Ali Esmaeelpoor Ghomsheie محمدعلی اسماعیل‌پور قمشه‌ای‌	1940	11 August 2018 (aged 77–78)	(Pahlavi Iran) Imperial State of Iran	Iran	Official Website
56		Javad Gharavi Aliari جواد غروی علیاری	1935	6 September 2018 (aged 82–83)	(Pahlavi Iran) Tabriz, Imperial State of Iran	Qom, Iran	Official Website
57		Mohaqiq Kabuli محقق كابلى	29 May 1928	11 June 2019 (aged 91)	Turkman Valley, Afghanistan	Kabul, Afghanistan	Official Website
58		Sayyid Mohammad Shahroudi السيد محمد شاهرودي	1 December 1925	7 July 2019 (aged 93)	(Kingdom of Iraq) Najaf, Mandatory Iraq	Tehran, Iran	Official Website
59		Mohammad Asif Mohseni محمد آصف محسني	26 April 1935	5 August 2019 (aged 84)	Kandahar, Afghanistan	Kabul, Afghanistan	
60		Yousef Saanei يوسف صانعي	16 October 1937	12 September 2020 (aged 82)	(Pahlavi Iran) Isfahan, Imperial State of Iran	Qom, Iran	Official Website
61		Sayyid Abbas Modaressi Yazdi السيد عباس مدرسي يزدي	1943	19 November 2020 (aged 76–77)	Najaf, Kingdom of Iraq	Qom, Iran	
62		Sayyid Mohammad Saeed Tabatabai al-Hakim السيد محمد سعيد الطباطبائي الحكيم	1 February 1936	3 September 2021 (aged 85)	Najaf, Kingdom of Iraq	Najaf, Iraq	Official Website
63		Lotfollah Saafi Golpaygani لطف الله صافی گلپایگانی	20 February 1919	1 February 2022 (aged 102)	(Qajar Iran) Golpayegan, Sublime State of Persia	Qom, Iran	Official Website
64		Shamsodin Mohammad Mojtahedi Najafi شمس الدین محمد مجتهدی نجفی	22 March 1933	27 February 2022 (aged 88)	(Pahlavi Iran) Imperial State of Iran	Iran	
65		Sayyid Mohammad Alavi Ali Hosseini Gorgani السيد محمد على علوى حسينى گرگانى	1940	15 March 2022 (aged 81–82)	Najaf, Kingdom of Iraq	Tehran, Iran	Official Website
66		Sayyid Raghib AleKamooneh Hosseini السيد راغب آل كمونة الحسيني	1942	16 May 2022 (aged 79–80)	Kingdom of Iraq	Iraq	Biography (doesn't work anymore)
67		Sayyid Mohammad Sadeq Hosayni Rouhani السيد محمد صادق حسيني روحاني	16 July 1926	16 December 2022 (aged 96)	(Pahlavi Iran) Qom, Imperial State of Iran	Qom, Iran	Official Website
68		Muhammad Hussain Najafi محمد حسين النجفي	10 April 1932	21 August 2023 (aged 91)	Jehanian, British India	Sargodha, Pakistan	Official website
69		Muhammad Taqi Majlesi Isfahani	1929	26 June 2023 (aged 94)	(Pahlavi Iran) Isfahan, Imperial State of Iran	Isfahan, Iran	
70		Qasem Taei قاسم الطائي	1960	16 September 2023 (aged 62–63)	(First Republic of Iraq) Iraqi Republic (1958–1968)	Iraq	Official Website
71		Muhammad Mahdi al-Khorasani محمد مهدي الخراساني	22 December 1928	17 September 2023 (aged 94)	Iraq		-
72		Mohammad Reza Nekoonam محمد رضا نکونام	9 January 1949	7 August 2024 (aged 75)	(Pahlavi Iran) Golpayegan, Imperial State of Iran	Iran	Official Website
73		Abbas Mahfouzi عباس محفوظی	9 August 1928	10 September 2024 (aged 96)	(Pahlavi Iran) Rudsar, Imperial State of Iran	Iran	Official Website
74		Mohammad Mehdi Khalesi محمد مهدي الخالصي	1935	22 November 2025 (aged 89–90)	Kingdom of Iraq	Iraq	
75		Seyyed Ali Hosseini Khamenei سید علی حسینی خامنه ای	19 April 1939	28 February 2026 (aged 86)	(Pahlavi Iran) Mashhad, Imperial State of Iran	Tehran, Iran	Official Website
76		Mohammad Ebrahim Jannaati محمد ابراهيم جناتی	1933	18 March 2026 (aged 93)	Shahrood, Imperial State of Iran	Qom, Iran	Official Website
77		Mohammad Ishaq al-Fayadh محمد إسحاق فياض	August 21, 1930	4 June 2026 (aged 95)	Jaghori, Kingdom of Afghanistan	Najaf, Iraq	Official Website
78		Sayyid Mousa Shubayri Zanjani سید موسی شبیری زنجانی	2 March 1928	21 September 2026 (aged 98)	Qom, Imperial State of Iran	Qom, Iran	Official Website
79		Hossein Wahid Khorasani حسین وحید خراسانی	1 January 1921	17 November 2026 (aged 105)	Nishapur, Qajar Iran	Qom, Iran	Official Website

== See also ==
- List of current maraji
- List of ayatollahs
- Marja
- Ijtihad
- Ayatollah
- Society of Seminary Teachers of Qom
- Jamal al-Din Golpayegani
