= List of burials at Fatima Masumeh Shrine =

This is a list of people buried at Fatima Masumeh Shrine in Qom, Iran.

The Twelver Shi'ite shrine is the burial site for many notable individuals, including six members of the Safavid dynasty, eleven members of the Qajar dynasty, and many notable political figures, scholars, and clerics.

== Honoree ==
- Fatemeh Masumeh (790–816), a daughter of Musa al-Kazim

== Royalty ==
=== Safavid dynasty ===
- Khayr al-Nisa Begum (1549–1579)
- Shah Safi (1611–1642) (r. 1629–1642)
- Shah Abbas II (1632–1666) (r. 1642–1666)
- Shah Suleiman I (1647–1694) (r. 1666–1694)
- Soltan Hoseyn (1668–1726) (r. 1694–1722)
- Shah Abbas III (d. 1739) (r. 1732–1736)

=== Qajar dynasty ===
- Qahraman Mirza (d. 1840) – Qajar prince
- Fath-Ali Shah (1772–1834) (r. 1797–1834)
- Mohammad-Amin Mirza (1819-1886)
- Mohammad Shah (1808–1848) (r. 1834–1848)
- Galin Khanom (d. 1857) – Qajar princess
- Malek Jahan Khanom (1805–1873) – Qajar Queen
- Touran Agha Khanoum (1861–1893) – Qajar princess
- Afsar od-Dowleh (fa) (1859–1901) – Qajar princess
- Ali-Naghi Mirza (fa) (1860–1917) – Qajar prince
- Malek-Mansour Mirza (1880–1922) – Qajar prince
- Abdol-samad Mirza (1845–1929) – Qajar prince
- Kamran Mirza (1856–1929) – Qajar prince and governor of Tehran

== Political figures ==
- Hassan Khan Mostowfi ol-Mamalek Ashtiani (fa) (1781–1845) – politician
- Manuchehr Khan Gorji Mo'tamed od-Dowleh (d. 1847) – politician
- Ali Khan Maragha'i (1807/08–1867) – politician
- Anoushirvan Khan Eyn ol-Molk Etezad od-Dowleh (d. 1868) – politician
- Farrokh Khan Amin od-Dowleh (1812–1871) – Persian ambassador to France and Great Britain
- Asadollah Nazem od-Dowleh (fa) (d. 1900) – politician
- Mirza Ali Asghar Khan Amin al-Soltan (1843–1907) – prime minister (1887–96) and (1907)
- Mohammad-Baqer Khan Saad os-Saltaneh (d. 1907) – politician
- Ebrahim Motamed os-Saltaneh (fa) (d. 1917) – politician
- Ahmad Moshir al-Saltaneh (1844–1919) – prime minister (1907–08)
- Mohammad Eqbal od-Dowleh (fa) (1848–1924) – politician
- Yahya Diba Nazem od-Dowleh (fa) (1886–1940) – politician
- Hassan Vosough Vosough od-Dowleh (1873–1950) – prime minister (1909–10, 1911 and 1916–17)
- Abdollah Vosough Motamed os-Saltaneh (fa) (1884–1952) – politician
- Ahmad Qavam Qavam os-Saltaneh (1876–1955) – prime minister (1921, 1922–23, 1942–43, 1946–47 and 1952)
- Faramarz Asadi (1869–1969) – politician
- Hossein Dadgar Adl ol-Molk (1881–1971) – speaker of the Majles (1928–35)
- Mohammad-Vali Gharani (1913–1979) – army general
- Mehdi Araghi (1930–1979) – a founder of Fadayan-e Islam
- Mehdi Bazargan (1907–1995) – prime minister (1979)
- Ali Larijani (1958–2026) – politician

== Scholars ==
- Aghabeyim Javanshir (1780–1832) – poet
- Yussef E'tesami (1874–1938) – writer and translator
- Parvin Etesami (1907–1941) – poet
- Mohammad Meshkat (fa) (1900–1980) – scholar
- Ali Davani (1929–2007) – author

== Clerics ==
- Qotbeddin Ravandi (fa) (d. 1177) – medieval cleric
- Fazlullah Nouri (1843–1909) – cleric
- Abdolkarim Haeri Yazdi (1859–1937) – cleric
- Mehdi Ashtiani (1888–1952) – cleric
- Mohammad-Taghi Khansari (fa) (1888–1952) – cleric
- Sadr al-Din al-Sadr (1882–1954) – cleric
- Hossein Borujerdi (1875–1961) – cleric
- Soltan ol-Vaezin Shirazi (1894–1971) – cleric
- Hassan Mazloumi, later named Barjesteh (1901-1969), cleric, keeper of the keys of the Shrine of Imam Reza in Mashhad, later legal specialist and landowner in Tehran
- Morteza Motahhari (1920–1979) – cleric
- Mohammad Mofatteh (1928–1979) – cleric
- Muhammad Husayn Tabataba'i (1904–1981) – cleric
- Asadollah Madani (1914–1981) – cleric
- Ali Qoddusi (1927–1981) – cleric
- Mohammad Montazeri (1944–1981) – cleric
- Khalil Kamarei (1898–1984) – cleric
- Reza Zanjani (1902–1984) – cleric
- Ahmad Khonsari (1887–1985) – cleric
- Morteza Haeri Yazdi (1916–1986) – cleric
- Shahabeddin Marashi Najafi (1897–1990) – cleric
- Mohammad-Reza Golpaygani (1898–1993) – cleric
- Hashem Amoli (1899–1993) – cleric
- Mohammad-Ali Araki (1894–1994) – cleric
- Seyed Reza Bahaadini (1908–1997) – cleric
- Mohammad-Jafar Moravej (1902–1999) – cleric
- Ahmad Azari Qomi (1925–1999) – cleric
- Mohammad Shirazi (1928–2001) – cleric
- Esmail Mousavi Zanjani (1928–2002) – cleric
- Sadegh Khalkhali (1926–2003) – cleric ("Eichmann of Iran")
- Mohammad Vaez Abaee Khorasani (1940–2004) – cleric
- Javad Tabrizi (1926–2006) – cleric
- Ali Meshkini (1921–2007) – cleric and chairman of Assembly of Experts (1983–2007)
- Mohammad Fazel Lankarani (1931–2007) – cleric
- Ahmad Mojtahedi Tehrani (1923–2008) – cleric
- Mohammad-Taqi Bahjat Foumani (1913–2009) – cleric
- Hossein-Ali Montazeri (1922–2009) – cleric and deputy supreme leader of Iran
- Mohammad Mofti al-Shia Mousavi (1928–2010) – cleric
- Abbas Hosseini Kashani (1931–2010) – cleric
- Mohammad-Hassan Ahmadi Faqih (1951–2010) – cleric
- Yousef Madani Tabrizi (1928–2013) – cleric
- Moslem Malakouti (1924–2014) – cleric
- Abdul-Karim Mousavi Ardebili (1926–2016) – cleric and chief justice (1981–89)
- Ahmad Ahmadi (1933–2018) – cleric
- Mahmoud Hashemi Shahroudi (1948–2018) – cleric and chief justice (1999–2009)
- Nasrallah Shah-Abadi (1930–2018) – cleric
- Mohammad Shahroudi (1925–2019) – cleric
- Mohaqiq Kabuli (1927–2019) – cleric
- Mohammad Momen (1938–2019) – cleric
- Ebrahim Amini (1925–2020) – cleric
- Mohammad Yazdi (1931–2020) – cleric and chief justice (1989–1999)
- Taqi Yazdi (1935–2021) – cleric

== See also ==
- List of mausoleums in Iran
- Shia Islam in Iran
- Holiest sites in Islam (Shia)
- Seyyed Mohammad Saeedi, the shrine trustee
