= List of burials at Imam Reza Shrine =

This is a list of people buried at Imam Reza Shrine.

The Shi'ite shrine is the burial site for many notable individuals, including members of the Timurid, Safavid, and Qajar families, and many notable political figures, scholars, and clerics.

Name	Lifespan (CE)		Occupation
Name	Born	Died	Occupation
Harun al-Rashid (in the Harun ِal-Rashid Mausoleum)	763	809	Abbasid caliph (786–809)
Imam Ali Reza (in the Harun ِal-Rashid Mausoleum)	765	818	8th Imam (798–818)
Shaykh Ahmad Tabarsi	1073	1153	Scholar
Sevin Beg Khanzada	1360	1412	Timurid dynasty Princess
Abul-Qasim Babur Mirza	1422	1457	Timurid dynasty Prince
Sultanum Begum	1516	1593	Queen consort of Shah Tahmasp I
Allahverdi Khan	1560	1613	Iranian General of Georgian origin
Shaykh Baha'i	1547	1621	Islamic Scholar
Dilaram Khanum	?	1647	Consort of Safavid Crown Prince and mother of Shah Safi
Muhammad al-Ḥurr al-ʿĀmilī	1624	1693	Shia cleric
Abbas Mirza	1789	1833	Qajar Crown Prince
Mohammad-Taqi Mirza	1791	1853	Qajar Prince
Mohammad Baqer Sharif Tabatabai	1823	1901	Scholar
Abu Talib Zanjani	1843	1911	Scholar
Princess Ashraf os-Saltaneh	1863	1914	Qajar Princess
Mass'oud Mirza Zell-e Soltan	1850	1918	Qajar prince
Hassan Ali Nokhodaki Isfahani	1862	1942	Cleric
Ahmed Aref El-Zein	1884	1960	Scholar
Forough Azarakhshi	1904	1963	Scholar
Ali-Akbar Fayyaz	1898	1971	Scholar
Muhammad Taqi Amoli	1887	1971	cleric
Raja of Mahmudabad, Mohammad Amir Ahmed Khan	1914	1973	Member of the Pakistan Movement
Mohammad Hadi al-Milani	1895	1975	Scholar
Manouchehr Eghbal	1909	1977	Prime Minister (1957–60) and CEO of NIOC
Asadollah Alam	1919	1978	Prime minister (1962–64) and minister of the Imperial Court (1967–77)
Gholam Hossein Tabrizi	1881	1980	Scholar
Ali Motamedi	1896	1980	Diplomat and politician
Mahmoud Farrokh Khorasani	1895	1981	Politician
Abdol Karim Hasheminejad	1932	1981	Cleric
Abdullah Musawi Shirazi	1892	1984	Cleric
Gholamreza Ghodsi	1925	1989	Poet
Badri Teymourtash	1908	1995	Scholar
Mohammad Taqi Jafari	1925	1998	Cleric
Ali Akbar Aboutorabi Fard	1939	2000	Cleric
Hasan Ali Morvarid	1911	2004	Cleric
Syed Jalaleddin Ashtiani	1925	2005	Cleric
Hassan Tabatabaei Qomi	1912	2007	Cleric
Mohammad-Sadegh Farman	1921	2012	Politician
Mohammad Ezodin Hosseini Zanjani	1921	2013	Cleric
Mohammad Baqer Shirazi	1931	2014	Cleric
Abbas Vaez-Tabasi	1935	2016	Cleric and chairman of the supervisory board of Astan Quds Razavi
Hassan Firouzabadi	1951	2021	Military commander and Chief of Staff of the Iranian Armed Forces
Ebrahim Raisi	1960	2024	8th President of Iran (2021–24)
Ali Khamenei	1939	2026	2nd Supreme Leader of Iran (1989–2026)

== See also ==
- List of mausoleums in Iran
- Shia Islam in Iran
- Holiest sites in Islam (Shia)
