= 1845 in Iran =

- Decades
- See also: Other events of 1845; Years in Iran

The following lists events that happened during 1845 in the Qajar era.

== Incumbents ==
- Monarch: Mohammad Shah Qajar

== Births ==
- ? – Abdol Majid Mirza, Iranian Prime Minister.
- ? – Ali Khan Vali, Iranian photographer.
- ? – Mirza Ali Khan La'li.
- ? – Seyyed Mohammad Taqi Ghazanfari.
