= 1877 in Iran =

- Decades
- See also: Other events of 1877; Years in Iran

The following lists events that happened during 1877 in Qajar era.

== Incumbents ==
- Monarch: Naser al-Din Shah Qajar

== Births ==
- May 27 – Mohammad Ali Tarbiat, Iranian politician and journalist.
- August 1 – Mohammad Ali Foroughi, Iranian writer and politician.
- ? – Mohammad Aghazadeh Khorasani, Iran Scientist.
- ? – Seyyed Musa Zarabadi, Iranian ayatollah.
- ? – Soleiman Eskandari, Iranian Qajar prince, historian and socialist politician.
