= Mohammad Ebrahim Ansari =

Iraqi Twelver Shi'a Marja

Grand Ayatollah Mohammad Ebrahim Ansari
- Born: 1936; Iraq
- Died: February 19, 2011 (aged 74–75); Iraq
- Website: www.imshiaa.com/vb/showthread.php?t=86949

Grand Ayatollah Mohammad Ebrahim Ansari (Arabic: محمد إبراهيم الأنصاري) (1936 – February 19, 2011) was an Iraqi Twelver Shi'a Marja.

He has studied in seminaries of Najaf, Iraq under Grand Ayatollah Abul-Qassim Khoei, Mohammad Baqir al-Sadr, and Muhsin al-Hakim.

== See also ==
- List of maraji
- List of deceased maraji
