= Qasem Taei =

Iraqi Twelver Shi'a Marja (1960–2023)

Grand Ayatollah Qasem Taei
- Born: 1960; Iraq
- Died: 16 September 2023 (aged 63)
- Website: www.kassimaltaai.org/

Grand Ayatollah Qasem Taei (Arabic: قاسم الطائي; 1960 – 16 September 2023) was an Iraqi Twelver Shi'a Marja.

Taei studied in seminaries of Najaf, Iraq under Grand Ayatollah Mohammad Mohammad Sadeq al-Sadr. He was the author of many Islamic books. He died of a heart condition on 16 September 2023, at the age of 63.

== See also ==
- List of current maraji
- List of deceased maraji
- List of maraji
