= Morteza Tehrani =

Iranian ayatollah

Ayatollah Morteza Tehrani
- مرتضی تهرانی
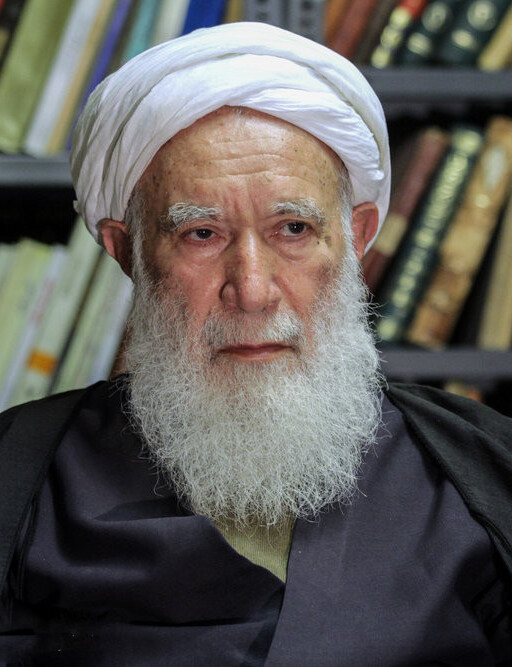
- Tehrani in 2011
- Born: 1933; Mashad, Iran
- Died: July 30, 2017 (aged 83–84); Mashad, Iran
- Website: ommeabiha.ir

Haj Agha Morteza Tehrani (1933 - 30 July 2017; Persian: مرتضی تهرانی) also known as Morteza Shahid Kalhori was Iranian ayatollah one of the contemporary Shia scholars of ethics and mujtahids. He was the brother of Mojtaba Tehrani and one of Ruhollah Khomeini's students.

== Biography ==
Morteza Tehrani was the eldest son of Mirza Abdul Ali Tehrani and the brother of Mojtaba Tehrani and Mehdi Kalhor. During his teenage years, he lived in Mashhad with his family for some time and when his family moved to Tehran, he went to Qom to study. His father was one of the students of Abdul Karim Haeri Yazdi and he used to attend the meetings of Mirza Jawad Agha Maleki Tabrizi and was a close friend of Morteza Zahid.

Morteza Tehrani was one of Ruhollah Khomeini's students. He also participated in the foreign jurisprudence courses of Hossein Borujerdi. He also participated in the second course of teaching Asfar by Muhammad Husayn Tabataba'i. In his youth, he was with Mohammad Mofatteh, Mohammad Taqi Misbah Yazdi, Mohammad-Reza Mahdavi Kani, Mohammad Baqer Bagheri Keni, Mohammed Emami-Kashani, Akbar Hashemi Rafsanjani, Mohsen Danesh Ashtiani, Hassan Mirdamadi, Behjati Kermani, Mirza Ali Ghafouri, Javad Elahi Keni and Mirza Hossein Nouri.

At the beginning of the revolution, by introducing Khomeini, he organized a meeting for the country's second-level officials, including ministers and deputies, and explained Malik Ashtar's treaty to them. More than 60 officials of the Islamic Republic participated in this meeting. It is said that this meeting was closed due to Mehdi Hashemi's comment on the necessity of assassinating Morteza Tehrani.

He was the imam of the Mirza Mousa Mosque (located in Tehran's Grand Bazar) and in addition to teaching extra jurisprudence and principles to his limited students, he used to give moral lectures to the bazaars after noon and evening prayers in that mosque and was involved in a dispute over its management. Also, weekly public meetings were held on Friday nights in the basement of his residential house (which was converted into a permanent Husayniyya).

Morteza Tehrani, who was hospitalized in the intensive care unit due to kidney failure, died in the morning of Saturday, July 30, 2017, in Mashhad. In Tehran, on the morning of Monday, August 1, his body was buried in Hosseiniyeshan in Dezashib neighborhood of Tehran. Morteza Tehrani bought a grave in Karbala and bequeathed to be buried in this city, for this reason his body was transferred to Iraq for burial. And on Wednesday, August 3, after being laying-in-state in the shrine of Ali bin Abi Talib in Najaf, he was transferred to Karbala and buried.
