= Sheida =

Sheida may refer to:

- Mirza Abbas Khan Sheida (1873–1949), Iranian sufi, poet and journalist
- Sheida (film), a 1999 Iranian film
