= Javad Gharavi Aliari =

Iranian Grand Ayatollah (1935-2018)

Grand Ayatollah Mirza Javad Gharavi Aliari Tabrizi
- Born: 1935; Tabriz, Iran
- Died: 6 September 2018; Qom, Iran
- Website: Official website

Grand Ayatollah Mirza Javad Gharavi Aliari Tabrizi (Arabic: آيت الله العظمى میرزا جواد غروى علياري تبريزى) (1935-2018) was an Iranian Twelver Shi'a Marja. He was born in Tabriz, Iran. He migrated to Najaf to study in Grand Ayatollah al-Khoei's seminaries. He was close to Iranian reformists.

== Death ==
Grand Ayatollah Gharavi Aliari died on 6 September 2018 at the age of 83.

== See also ==
- Lists of maraji
- List of ayatollahs
