= Mohammad Mofti al-shia Mousavi =

Iranian Grand Ayatollah (1928-2010)

Grand Ayatollah Sayyid Mohammad Mofti al-Shi'a Mousavi

Personal life
- Born: 1928 Iran
- Died: 19 May 2010 (aged 81–82)
- Resting place: Fatima Masumeh Shrine, Qom

Religious life
- Religion: Shia Islam
- Sect: Twelver
- Profession: Marja'

Senior posting
- Teacher: Seyyed Hossein Borujerdi; Ruhollah Khomeini; Muhsin al-Hakim; Abu al-Qasim al-Khoei; Ayatollah Shaykh Husayn Hilli
- Website: moftialshia.ir

Grand Ayatollah Sayyid Mohammad Mofti al-Shi'a Mousavi (Persian: السيد محمد مفتي الشيعة موسوي) (born 1928- died 19 May 2010) was an Iranian Twelver Shi'a Marja.

He has studied in seminaries of Qum, Iran under Grand Ayatollah Seyyed Hossein Borujerdi and Ruhollah Khomeini. He has also studied in seminaries of Najaf, Iraq under Grand Ayatollah Muhsin al-Hakim, Abu al-Qasim al-Khoei and Ayatollah Shaykh Husayn Hilli.

== See also ==
- List of maraji
- List of deceased maraji
