= Jamal al-Din Golpayegani =

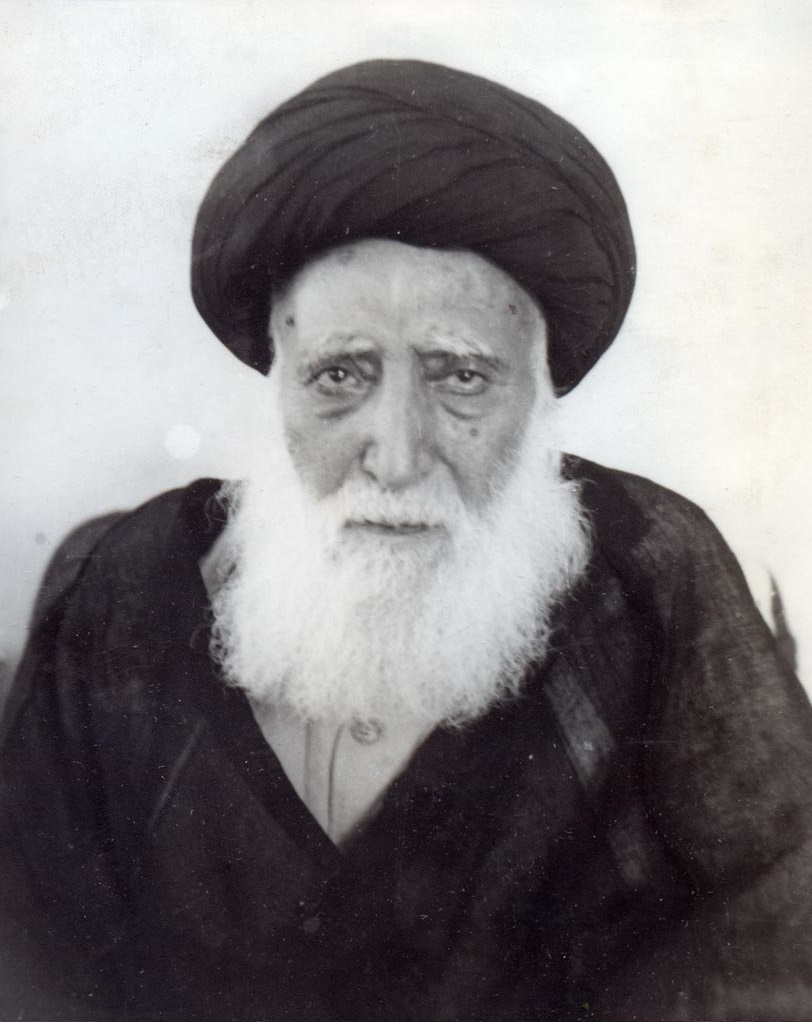
- Jamal al-Din Golpayegani, 1950s

Personal life
- Born: 1295 AH Sa'idabad, Golpayegan, Iran
- Died: 19 Muharram 1377 AH

Religious life
- Religion: Shia Islam

Sayyid Jamal al-Din Mousavi Golpaygani (Persian: سید جمال‌الدین گلپایگانی; born 1295 AH) was an Iranian Shia Mujtahid and mystic he was born in the village of Sa'idabad in Golpayegan.

== Education and career ==
Ayatollah Golpaygani studied religious sciences in Golpaygan for several years. In 1311 AH, at the age of 16, he went to the Almasiyeh Seminary in Isfahan. In 1319 AH, at the age of 23, he went to Iraq and continued his studies at the Najaf seminary. His teachers in Najaf included Muhammad Kazim Khurasani, Reza Hamadani, Sayyid Muhammad Kazim Tabatabai Yazdi, Muhammad Bahari, Mirza Muhammad Taqi Shirazi, and Muhammad Hussein Mirza Naini. In 1365 AH, following the death of Seyyed Abolhassan Isfahani, Jamal al-Din Golpaygani became a Shia marja and a large number of Shias in Iraq and Iran followed him. Among his students, can mention Hasanaali Nejabat Shirazi, Mohammad Taqi Ja'fari, Sayyid Abbas Kashani, Sayyid Mohammad Hossein Hosseini Tehrani, Lotfollah Safi Golpaygani, Sheikh Hassan Safi Isfahani, Mohammad Hassan Alam Najafabadi, Ahmad Fayyaz, Morteza Ansari, Heydar Ali Mohaqqeq, Mohammad Hossein Kalbasi, Mohammad Ali Ahmadian Najafabadi, Sayyid Zia al-Din Isfahani, Sayyid Morteza Hosseini Firouzabadi, Abdullah Majd Faqihi Borujerdi, and Abolfazl Khansari.

== Works ==
The works of Sayyid Jamal al-Din Golpaygani include: Al-Ijtihad wa al-Taqlid؛ Ijtima al-Amr wa al-Nahy؛ Jawaz al-Baqa' 'ala Taqlid al-Mayyit؛ Kitab fi al-Salah؛ Qa'idat al-Faragh wa al-Tajawuz؛ Taqrirat Dars Ayat Allah al-Akhund al-Khurasani, Mirza al-Na'ini, wa Mirza Muhammad Taqi al-Shirazi؛ Al-Tarattub؛ Risalah 'Amaliyyah؛ Risalah La Darar wa La Dirar؛ Hadith al-Raf'؛ Risalah Munajjizat al-Marid؛ Usul al-Fiqh؛ Diwan؛ Wasaya؛ Risalah fi al-Ijarah؛ Risalah fi al-Taharah؛ Fiqh؛ Risalah Istidlaliyyah fi al-Ghaybah.

== Death ==
Sayyid Jamal al-Din Golpayegani passed away on 19 Muharram 1377 AH, at the age of 82.

== See also ==
- Marja'
- Ijtihad
- List of ayatollahs
- Shia Islam
- Shia clergy
