= Mohammad Ali Qazi Tabatabaei =

Iranian politician and Shiite cleric (1914–1979)

- سید محمدعلی قاضی طباطبایی

Representative of the Supreme Leader in East Azerbaijan and Imam Jumu'ah of Tabriz
- In office July 1979 – 2 November 1979
- Appointed by: Ruhollah Khomeini
- Preceded by: None (office created)
- Succeeded by: Mir Asadollah Madani

Personal details
- Born: 1914 Tabriz, Iran
- Died: 2 November 1979 (aged 64–65) Tabriz, Iran
- Education: Qom Hawza & Najaf Hawza

Seyid Mohammad Ali Qazi Tabatabaei (Persian: سید محمدعلی قاضی طباطبایی; 1914 – 1979) was an Iranian politician, and Shiite cleric. He was also the first imam Jumu'ah for Tabriz and Representative of the Supreme Leader in East Azerbaijan. Tabatabaei was born in Tabriz, East Azerbaijan. He was a member of the Muslim People's Republic Party in Tabriz. Tabatabaei was assassinated when praying in Tabriz. Qazi Tabatabaei in the Iranian political literature named him the first martyr of mihrab.

Political offices
Preceded by Was not composed	Imam Jumu'ah of Tabriz and Representative of the Supreme Leader; 1979 — 1979	Succeeded by (Iran) Mir Asadollah Madani
