= Mohammad Vaez Mousavi =

Iranian cleric

Seyyed Mohammad Vaez Mousavi
- سید محمد واعظ موسوی
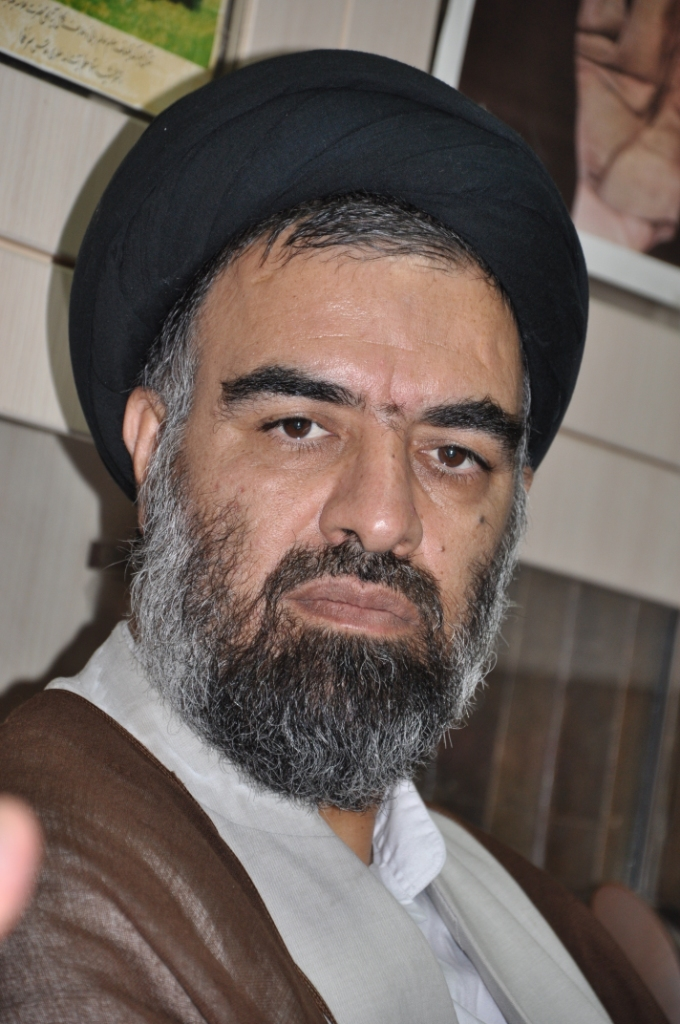

member of Assembly of Experts
- In office December 15, 2006 – 30 June 2016
- Preceded by: Mirza Ali Ahmadi Mianji
- Succeeded by: Ali Malakouti
- Constituency: East Azerbaijan

Personal details
- Born: 1964 (age 61–62) Shabestar, East Azerbaijan
- Education: Qom Hawza
- Website: vaezmousavi.ir

Hujjat al-Islam Seyyed Mohammad Vaez Mousavi (Persian: سید محمد واعظ موسوی, was born 1964 in Shabestar, East Azerbaijan) is an Iranian Shiite cleric and politician. He is a member of the 4th Assembly of Experts from electorate East Azerbaijan. Va'ez Mousavi won with 305,072 votes

== See also ==
- List of members in the Fourth Term of the Council of Experts
