= Abbas Hosseini Kashani =

Iranian cleric

Grand Ayatollah Sayyid Abbas Hosseini Kashani
- السید عباس حسيني کاشانی

Personal life
- Born: 1931 Iraq
- Died: 18 July 2010 (aged 78–79)
- Resting place: Fatima Masumeh Shrine
- Website: alkashani.ir

Religious life
- Religion: Shia Islam
- Sect: Twelver
- Profession: Marja; cleric

Senior posting
- Teacher: Abu al-Qasim al-Khoei; Muhsin al-Hakim

Grand Ayatollah Sayyid Abbas Hosseini Kashani (1931 – July 18, 2010) (Persian: السید عباس حسيني کاشانی) was an Iraqi born Iranian Twelver Shi'a Marja from Karbala whose ancestors were from Kashan, Iran hence his surname.

He studied in seminaries of Najaf, Iraq under Grand Ayatollah Abu al-Qasim al-Khoei and Muhsin al-Hakim.

== See also ==
- List of maraji
- List of deceased maraji
