= Morteza Hosseini Fayaz =

Iraqi grand ayatollah

Grand Ayatollah Sayyid Murtadha Husayni al-Fayadh
- Born: April 9, 1929; Najaf, Iraq
- Died: August 20, 2014 (aged 85); Iraq

Sayyid Murtadha Husayni al-Fayadh (1928 - 20 August 2014, Arabic: السيد مرتضى الحسيني فياض) was an Iraqi Twelver Shi'a Marja.

Al-Fayadh was born in Najaf, Iraq in 1928, to an Alawite family. His father and grandfather both held the title of Ayatoallah. He studied in seminaries of Najaf under Abul-Qassim Khoei and Muhsin al-Hakim.

Al-Fayadh died on August 20, 2014. His funeral procession was held in Najaf, where he was buried in the Wadi al-salam cemetery.

== See also ==
- List of maraji
