= Muhammad Mahdi al-Khorasani =

Iraqi grand ayatollah (1928–2023)

Muhammad Mahdi al-Khorasani (Arabic: محمد مهدي الخرساني; 22 December 1928 – 17 September 2023) was an Iraqi grand ayatollah. He was born on 22 December 1928, and died on 17 September 2023, at the age of 94.

== See also ==
- List of current maraji
- List of deceased maraji
