= Mohammad Ebrahim Jannaati =

Iranian Twelver Shia Marja (1933–2026)

Grand Ayatollah Mohammad Ebrahim Jannati
- محمد ابراهیم جناتی
- Born: 1933; Shahrood, Persia
- Died: 18 March 2026 (aged 93); Qom, Iran
- Title: Grand Ayatollah
- Website: www.jannaati.com/

Grand Ayatollah Mohammad Ebrahim Jannaati (Persian: آیت الله العظمی محمد ابراهیم جناتی; 1933 – 18 March 2026) was an Iranian Twelver Shia Marja.

== Biography ==
Mohammad Ebrahim Jannaati was born in Shahrud, Persia in 1933. He studied in seminaries of Qom and Najaf. Jannaati was known for his progressive fatwas on women and youth issues. He died in Qom on 18 March 2026, at the age of 93.

== Teachers and mentors ==
Jannaati learned from and studied under Mahmoud Hashemi Shahroudi, Muhsin al-Hakim, Abd al-Hadi al-Shirazi, Hussein Helli, Mirza Baqir Zanjani, and Abu al-Qasim al-Khoei.

== Lectures and Academic Activities ==
Ayatollah Jannati has delivered speeches at various scholarly conferences and gatherings, both within Iran and abroad. He has also presented papers and lectured at the University of Birmingham, Istanbul University, and the University of Damascus, and has spoken in Mecca and Medina. He has discussed his fatwas with various newspapers and magazines in Iran and other countries. His works and views have been published in multiple languages, comprising dozens of books and hundreds of articles, lectures, and interviews.

== Rare Islamic law and modern ==
Rare rulings:"

- If the loss of a Muslim man with a non-Muslim woman is essential and leave it caused Muslim outrage and insult to Islam or may not pessimism, there is no problem.
- Muslim man marrying a girl or woman from People of the Books such as Zoroastrian, Jewish and Christian is permitted, either on a temporary or permanent basis.
- Relations between girls and boys, women and men, strangers in the community, if not corruption and to preserve Islamic law and to the extent that is necessary, not a hindrance.
- It is necessary for women to cover their whole bodies from strangers except for the face and hands. No special kind and color of dress is recommended; anything with which the body can be covered would be sufficient.

== Works ==
Mohammad Ebrahim Jannati has written more than 40 books. The most important among them are:

1. Kitab al-Hajj (The Book of Hajj) – five volumes
2. Durus fi al-Fiqh al-Muqaran – ten volumes
3. Sources of Ijtihad According to Islamic Schools of Thought
4. Historical Stages of Ijtihad According to Islamic Schools of Thought
5. Hajj Rituals According to Islamic Schools of Thought
6. Quranic Sciences According to Islamic Schools of Thought
7. Hadith Sciences According to Islamic Schools of Thought
8. Historical Stages of Jurisprudence and Its Modes of Exposition
9. Lyrical Music from the Perspective of Ijtihad-based Jurisprudence

== See also ==
- List of maraji
