= Ali Malakouti =

Iranian Ayatollah

- علی ملکوتی
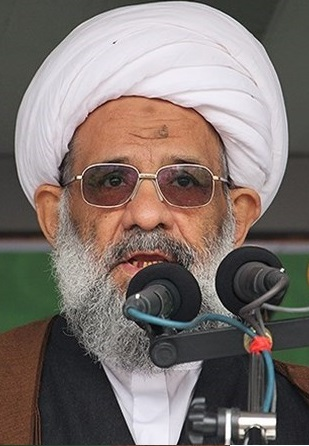

Member of the Assembly of Experts
- Incumbent
- Assumed office 24 May 2016
- Preceded by: Mohammad Vaez Mousavi
- Constituency: East Azerbaijan
- Majority: 688,700

Personal details
- Born: 1948 (age 77–78) Qom, Iran
- Parent: Moslem Malakouti (father)
- Education: Qom Hawza

Ali Malakouti (Persian: علی ملکوتی, born 1948) is an Iranian Shiite cleric and politician. He is a member of the 5th and 6th Assembly of Experts from the East Azerbaijan electorate. Malakouti won his membership with 688,700 votes.

== See also ==
- List of members in the Fifth Term of the Council of Experts
