= Moslem Malakouti =

Iranian Shiite cleric (1924–2014)

Grand Ayatollah Moslem Malakouti
- مسلم ملکوتی
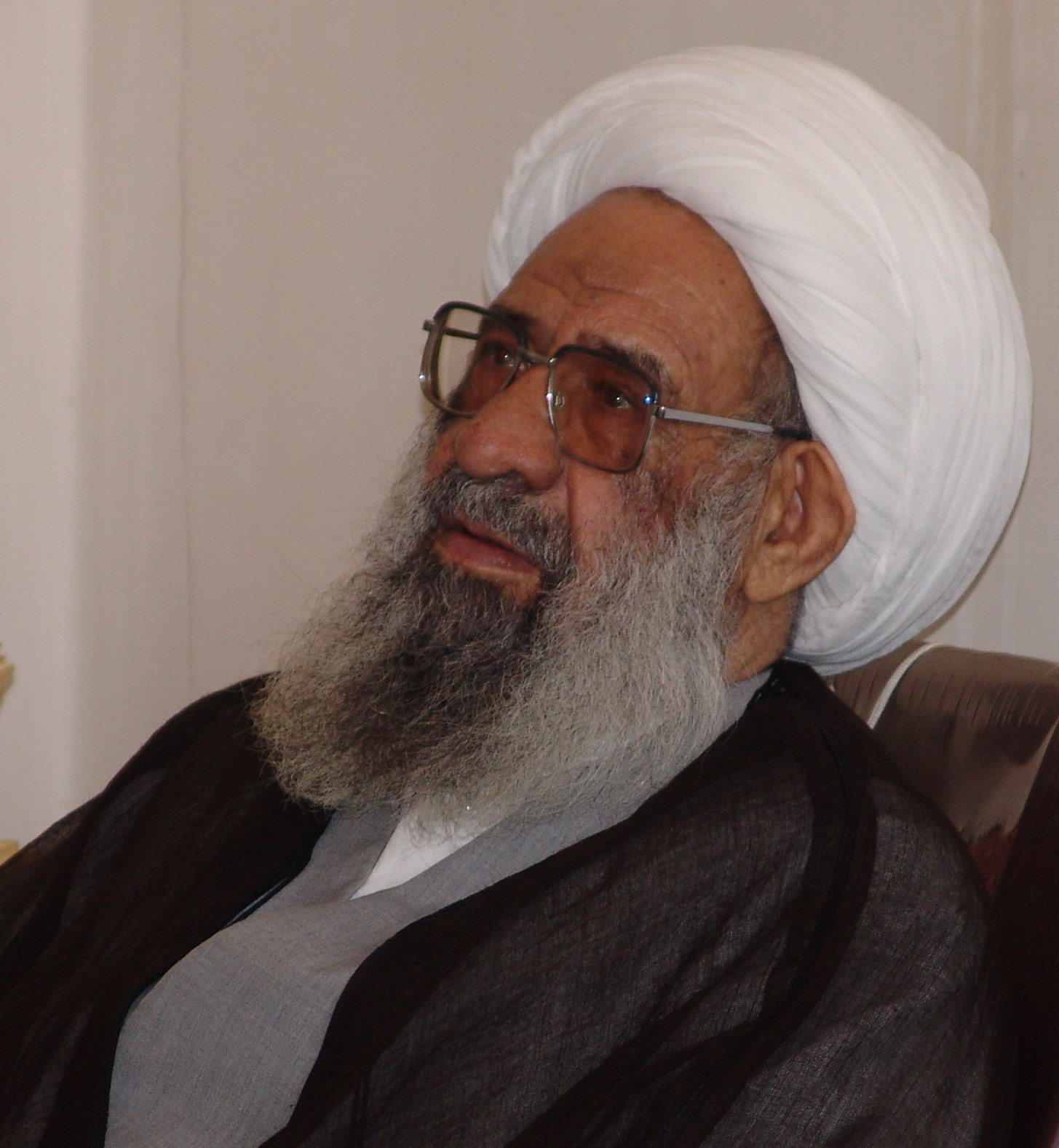

Personal life
- Born: 5 June 1924 Sarab, East Azerbaijan, Qajar Iran
- Died: 24 April 2014 (aged 89) Tehran, Iran
- Resting place: Fatima Masumeh Shrine, Qom
- Children: Ali Malakouti
- Education: Qom Hawza

Religious life
- Religion: Shia Islam
- Profession: Marja'

Representative of the Supreme Leader and Imam Jumu'ah of Tabriz
- In office 1981–1995
- Appointed by: Ruhollah Khomeini
- Preceded by: Asadollah Madani
- Succeeded by: Mohsen Mojtahed Shabestari
- Constituency: East Azerbaijan

Member of Assembly of Experts
- In office 1982–1998
- Constituency: East Azerbaijan

Grand Ayatollah Moslem Malakouti (Persian: مسلم ملکوتی, 5 June 1924 – 24 April 2014) was an Iranian Shiite cleric, Marja and third imam Jumu'ah for Tabriz. His son Ali Malakouti is member of the Assembly of Experts.

== Education ==
Malakouti started learning the Quran and religious sciences when he was a child. He continued his education in the seminaries of Sarab, Tabriz, Qom, Mashhad, and Najaf. He studied jurisprudence, the principles of jurisprudence, philosophy, hadith, mathematics, and other sciences with different teachers and scholars, and eventually reached the level of ijtihad. He taught in seminaries for many years and had many students.

== Political activities ==
Before the revolution, Malakouti worked against the Shah's government and encouraged others to join the struggle. He established a library and a Qarz al-Hasanah fund in the city of Sarab to bring young people together to fight against the Shah's regime. He was also a member of the Society of Seminary Teachers of Qom and attended its secret meetings. Because of his activities, SAVAK placed him under surveillance several times in Qom and Azerbaijan. After the revolution in 1979, he worked in Imam Khomeini's office and went to Azerbaijan and Zanjan to solve people's problems in these regions. Following the assassination of Ayatollah Madani in 1981, Imam Khomeini appointed him as his representative in Azerbaijan and as the Friday Prayer leader of Tabriz. During those years, he called on people to stay united and encouraged them to go to the war front and help the soldiers. Malakouti also represented the people of East Azerbaijan in the first and second terms of the Assembly of Experts.

== works ==
The works of Ayatollah Moslem Malakouti include: Usury in Islamic Law; The Mosque Became a Mosque (a complete history of Azerbaijan); Al-Muhakamat , a commentary on Kifayat al-Usul; a complete work on the principles of Islamic jurisprudence; notes on Al-Asfar; notes on Al-Shifa; Public Security in Islam, or Enjoining Good and Forbidding Wrong; a commentary on Surah Al-Fatiha; The Hypocrites in the Quran, Sunnah and History; The Difference between Religion, Science and Philosophy; Risalah Tawzih al-Masa'il; Hajj Rites; The Martyrdom of Imam Hussein; notes on Al-Urwah al-Wuthqa; Prayer; Penalties and Blood Money; and Endowed Properties According to Endowment Deed No. 6.

== See also ==
- Lists of maraji
- List of deceased maraji
- List of members in the First Term of the Council of Experts
- List of members in the Second Term of the Council of Experts

Political offices
Preceded by Mir Asadollah Madani	Imam Jumu'ah of Tabriz and Representative of the Supreme Leader; 1981–1995	Succeeded by Mohsen Mojtahed Shabestari
