= Mohammad Ali Esmaeelpoor Ghomsheie =

Iranian Twelver Shi'a Marja (1940-2018)

Grand Ayatollah Mohammad Ali Esmaeelpoor Ghomsheiy
- Born: 1940; Iran
- Died: 11 August 2018; Iran
- Website: www.esmailpour.org

Grand Ayatollah Mohammad Ali Esmaeelpoor Ghomsheiy (Persian: محمد علي اسماعيلپور قمشهاي) (born 1940) was an Iranian Twelver Shi'a Marja.

He has studied in seminaries of Qum, Iran under Grand Ayatollah Ruhollah Khomeini and Mohammad-Reza Golpaygani.

== Death ==
Ayatollah Esmailpour died on 11 August 2018.

== See also ==
- List of maraji
