= Mirza Mousa Mosque =

Shi'ite mosque in Tehran, Iran

- مسجد میرزا موسی
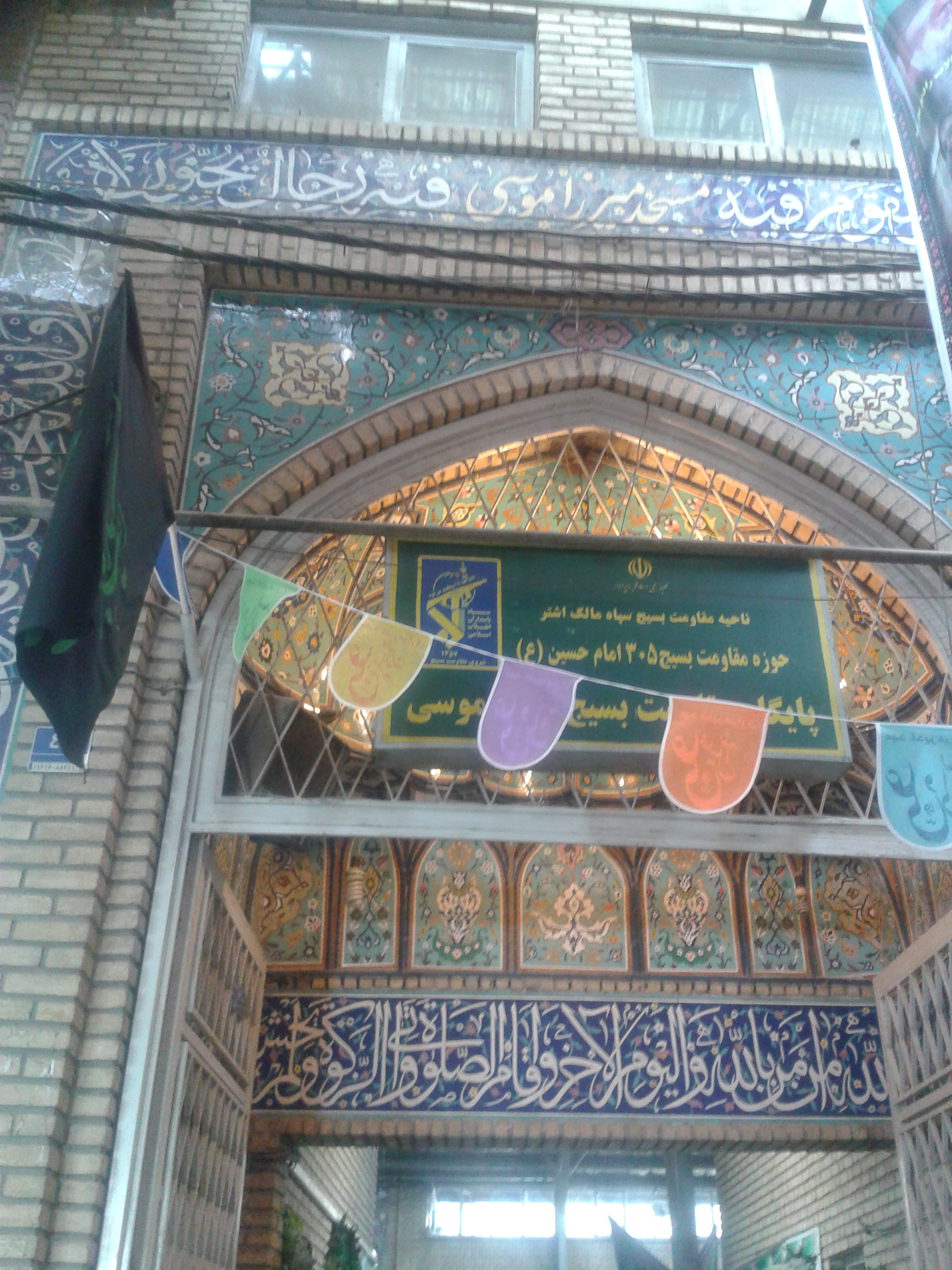
- The mosque entrance in 2017

- Location of the mosque in Tehran

Religion
- Affiliation: Shia Islam
- Ecclesiastical or organizational status: Mosque
- Status: Active

Location
- Location: Naser Khosrou Street, Grand Bazaar, Tehran, Tehran province
- Country: Iran
- Interactive map of Mirza Mousa Mosque
- Coordinates: 35°40′34″N 51°25′29″E

Architecture
- Type: Mosque architecture
- Style: Qajar
- Founder: Mirza Mousa Tafreshi
- Completed: 1277 AH (1860/1861 CE)

Iran National Heritage List
- Official name: Mirza Mousa Mosque
- Type: Built
- Designated: 16 October 2004
- Reference no.: 11198
- Conservation organization: Cultural Heritage, Handicrafts and Tourism Organization of Iran

The Mirza Mousa Mosque (Persian: مسجد میرزا موسی; Arabic: مسجد ميرزا موسى), sometimes spelled as the Mirza Musa Mosque, is a Shi'ite mosque located in Naser Khosrou Street, near the Grand Bazaar in the city of Tehran, in the province of Tehran, Iran.

Completed in 1277 AH (1860/1861 CE), during the Qajar era, the mosque was added to the Iran National Heritage List on 16 October 2004, administered by the Cultural Heritage, Handicrafts and Tourism Organization of Iran.

== Overview ==
The building was previously used as a madrasa from the 1840s CE, during the reign of Nasereddin Shah. The mosque has three shabestans, however only the southern shabestan is useful, with 15 columns which the capital parts of these columns are attractive. The mehrab is designed with stalactite works.

== See also ==
- Shia Islam in Iran
- List of mosques in Iran
