= Akhund Mullah Mohammad Kashani =

Iranian Grand Ayatollah (1834-1915)

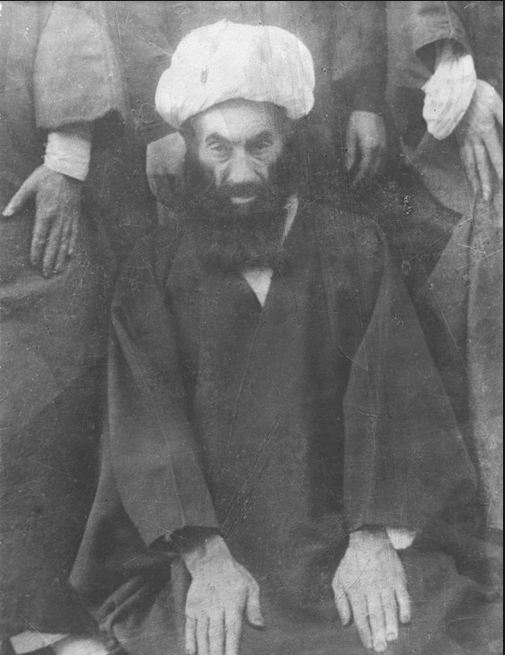
Akhund Mullah Mohammad Kashani

Akhund Mullah Mohammad Kashani (Persian: آخوند ملا محمد کاشانی) was a 19th century mystic, philosopher, sage, Shiite scholar. He was a teacher of philosophy and mysticism.

== Life ==
Akhund Mullah Mohammad Kashani was born in Kashan.

He promoted the mystical philosophy of Sadra.

He died on 3 July 1915 in Isfahan, at the age of 90, and was buried in Takht-e Foulad.

Ayatollah Kashani was one of his disciples.

== Pupils ==
He also taught many eminent pupils such as following:

- Abu l-Hasan al-Isfahani
- Rahim Arbab
- Agha Zia ol Din Araghi
- Hossein Borujerdi
- Aqa Najafi Quchani
- Hassan Modarres
- Mirza Hassan Jaberi Ansari
- Sheikh Mohammad Hakim Khorasani
- Seyyed Mostafa Kashani
- Seyyed Mohammadreza Khorasani
- Tarab Esfahani
- Mir Mohammad Latif Reza Tofighi
- Sheikh Hashem Qazvini
- Mirza Abolqasem
- Mohammad Nasir Shirazi
- Mirza Ali Aqa Shirazi
- Seyyed Jamal al-Din Golpayegani
- Mirza Mohammad Baqer Emami
- Ayatollah Haeri Dastjerdi Esfahani (Forghani)
- Mirza Ali Akbar Sheikh al-Islam
- Mirza Yahya Modarres Esfahani
- Aqa Mohammad Fayyaz Hamedani
