= Mohammad Shahroudi =

Iranian Grand Ayatollah (1925-2019)

Grand Ayatollah Sayyid Mohammad Shahroudi آيت الله العظمى سيد محمد حسينى شاهرودى
- Born: December 1925; Najaf, Iraq
- Died: 7 July 2019 (aged 94); Tehran, Iran
- Other name: Persian: آية الله العظمى سيد محمد حسينى شاهرودى
- Title: Grand Ayatollah
- Website: Official website

Grand Ayatollah Sayyid Mohammad Shahroudi (Arabic: آيت الله العظمى سيد محمد حسينى شاهرودى) (December 1925 – 7 July 2019) was a senior Iraqi Twelver Shi'a Marja' in Iran.

He studied in seminars of Najaf and Qom under Grand Ayatollah Hashem Amoli, and Grand Ayatollahs Syed Jamaluddin Golpaygani, Sayyid Mahmoud Hussaini Shahroudi and Abdul Hussain Rashti.

== Works and activities ==
The works of Mohammad Hosseini Shahroudi include Dhakhirat al-Mu'minin li-Yawm al-Din, Tawdih Manasik al-Hajj, Dorus fi Ahkam al-Nisa', Kitab al-Taharah, Kitab al-Sawm, Risalah Tawdih al-Masa'il, Istifta'at, Lessons for Women, and Risalah Mukhtasar al-Ahkam. Some of these works were written in Arabic, Persian, and Urdu. Kitab al-Taharah was based on his advanced lessons in Islamic law and was written by his brother, Sayyid Hossein Hosseini Shahroudi.

One of the most significant activities of the Shahroudi family was helping to revive the tradition of the pilgrimage walk to Karbala.

== Death ==
Mohammad Shahroudi died in Tehran, Iran at the age of 94.

== See also ==
- List of maraji
