= Yousef Madani Tabrizi =

Iranian grand ayatollah

Grand Ayatollah Sayyid Yousef Madani Tabrizi
- السيد يوسف مدنی تبریزی

Personal life
- Born: 1928 Tabriz, Iran
- Died: 2013 (aged 84–85) Qom, Iran
- Resting place: Fatima Masumeh Shrine, Qom

Religious life
- Religion: Shia Islam
- Sect: Twelver
- Profession: Marja'

Senior posting
- Influenced by: Seyyed Hossein Borujerdi; Muhammad Husayn Tabatabaei
- Website: madanitabrizi.org (in Persian)

Grand Ayatollah Sayyid Yousef Madani Tabrizi (Persian: السيد يوسف مدنی تبریزی; 1928-16 June 2013) was an Iranian Twelver Shi'a Marja.

He studied in seminaries of Qum, Iran under Grand Ayatollah Seyyed Hossein Borujerdi and Muhammad Husayn Tabatabaei. He is the author of many Islamic books.

He died due to old age on 16 June 2013.

== See also ==
- List of maraji
