= Mohammad Baqer Shirazi =

Grand Ayatollah Sayyid Mohammad Baqir Shirazi
- Born: 26 November 1931; Iran
- Died: 13 May 2014 (aged 82); Tehran, Iran
- Other names: Hajj Sayyed Mohammad Bagher Shirazi; Mohammad Baqir al-Shirazi

Grand Ayatollah Sayyid Mohammad Baqir Shirazi (Persian: السيد محمد باقر شيرازي; 26 November 1931 – 13 May 2014) was an Iranian Twelver Shi'a Marja. He was the highest-ranking Shia marja in Iran and Iraq.

== Personal life ==
Shirazi was born on 26 November 1931 in Iran. He died in Imam Reza (AS) Hospital in Tehran on 15 May 2014, aged 82.

== Education ==
Shirazi studied in the seminaries of Najaf, Iraq under Grand Ayatollah Abul-Qassim Khoei and Mohammad Hussaini Shirazi.

== See also ==
- List of Maraji
