= Mirza Abbas Khan Sheida =

Iranian sufi, poet and Journalist

Mirza Abbas Khan Sheida (1873–1949; Persian: میرزاعباس‌خان شیدا) also known as Sheida-ye-Esfahani (شیدای اصفهانی), was an Iranian sufi, poet and Journalist.

== Biography ==
Sheida was born in 1873 in Shahre-Kord near Isfahan. His father Mirza Es-hagh Dehkordi, was the governor-general of Shahre Kord and the province of Chahar Mahaal o Bakhtiari. The family moved to Isfahan after Mirza Es-hagh was killed.

Sheida attended Sadr School with his cousin Ayatollah Rahim Arbab and finished his traditional studies in Fiqh, usul, Persian and Arabic literature, and philosophy under the supervision of scholars such as Jahangir Khan Ghashghaei and Ayatollah Akhond Kashi; he graduated as an Ayatollah, something that he never used for his future career.

His close friends were known sufis of the time such as the Khatonabadi family.

Sheida published one of the first four newspapers in Iran, the Baladieh Esfahan. Later he started publishing the Daneshkadeh-e-Esfahan, and he published a total of twenty-one issues. He spent all of his inheritance and his income for his journals and weekly meeting of poems in city of Isfahan.
