= Mirza Ali Khan La'li =

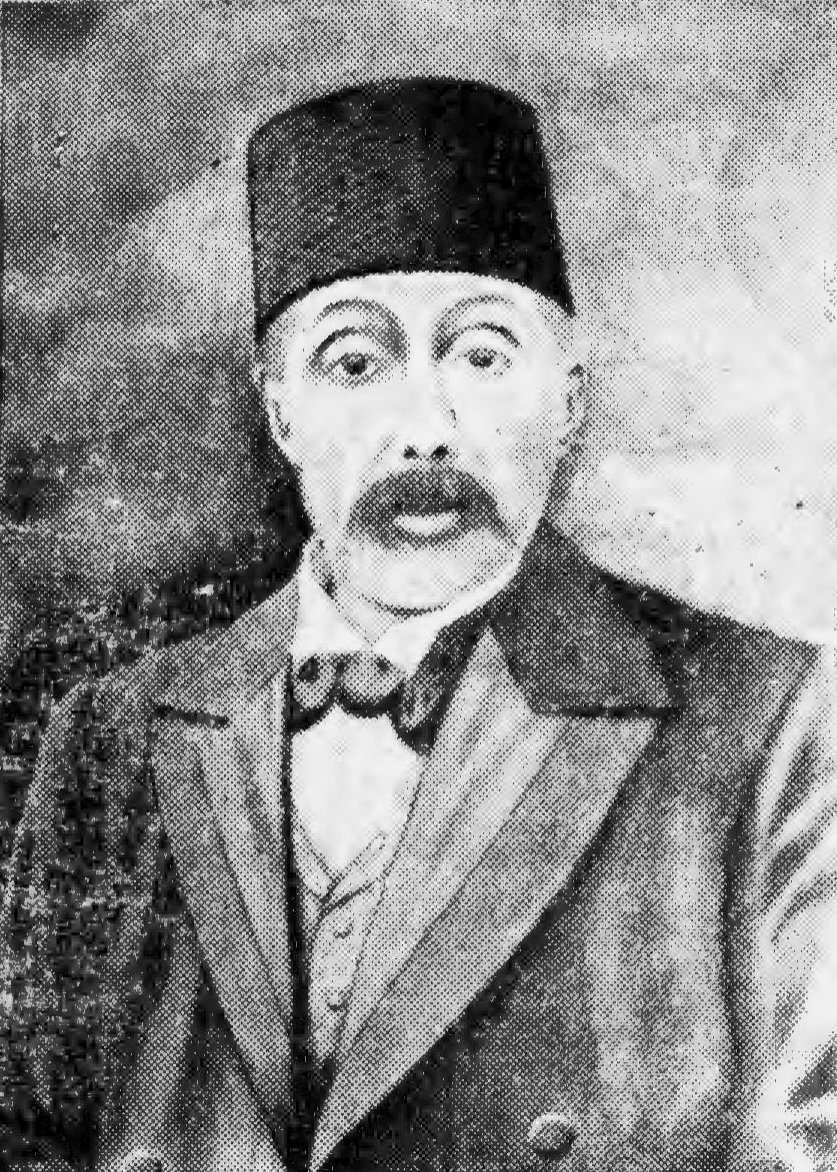
- A portrait of La'li
- Born: 1845 Erivan, Russian Empire
- Died: 1907 (aged 61–62) Tabriz, Qajar Iran
- Occupation: Poet, physician

Mirza Ali Khan La'li, also known as Hakim La'li (1845–1907), was a writer and physician who wrote satirical Azerbaijani poetry "in the traditional style".

Born in Erivan (Yerevan), at a young age, La'li moved to Qajar Iran and settled in Tabriz. He pursued his medical studies in Constantinople (Istanbul) and returned to Tabriz afterwards, where he worked as a doctor until his death in 1907.

== Sources ==
- Javadi, H.; Burrill, K. (1988). "AZERBAIJAN x. Azeri Turkish Literature". In Yarshater, Ehsan (ed.). Encyclopædia Iranica. Vol. III/3: Azerbaijan IV–Bačča(-ye) Saqqā. London and New York: Routledge & Kegan Paul. pp. 251–255. ISBN 978-0-71009-115-4.
