= Mojtaba Tehrani =

Iranian Grand Ayatollah (1933–2013)

Grand Ayatollah Mojtaba Tehrani
- مجتبی تهرانی
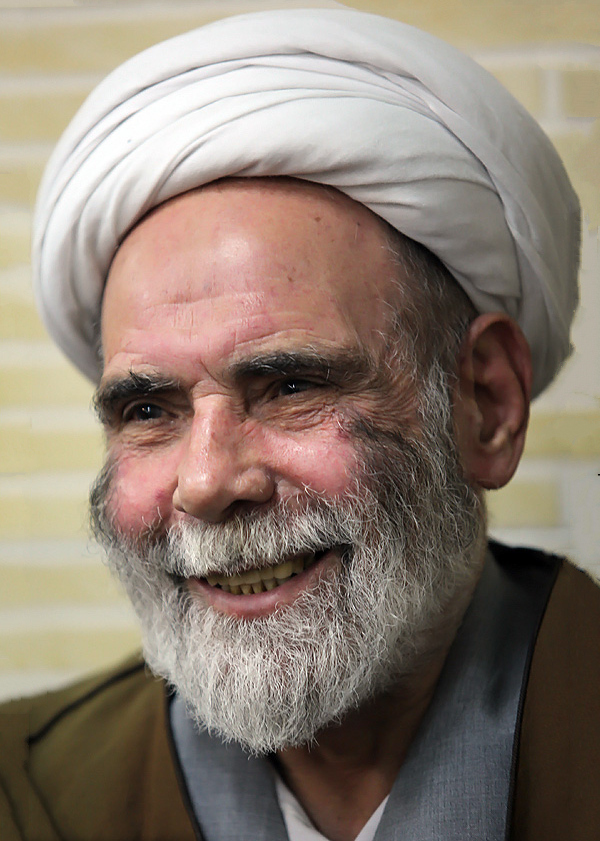
- Born: 4 April 1933; Tehran, Imperial State of Iran
- Died: 1 January 2013 (aged 79); Tehran, Iran
- Website: www.mojtabatehrani.ir

Grand Ayatollah Agha Mojtaba Tehrani (Persian: مجتبی تهرانی; 4 April 1933 – 1 January 2013) was an Iranian Twelver Shi'a Marja' taqlid, which is described as "a high-ranking Shia cleric who is regarded as a source of emulation".

== Biography ==
Tehrani studied at the Islamic seminary in Qom under the future Grand Ayatollah Ruhollah Khomeini, and he wrote a personal Resalah, a legal manual of edicts on Islamic law. He was "imam of one of Tehran's largest and most important mosques". Ali Khamenei, the second Supreme Leader of Iran, attended his funeral procession.

== See also ==
- List of deceased maraji
