= Seyyed Musa Zarabadi =

Seyyed Musa Zarabadi-e Qazvini (1877, Qazvin - 1935, Qazvin) (Persian: سید موسی زرآبادی قزوینی) was one of the shia Marja and mystic.

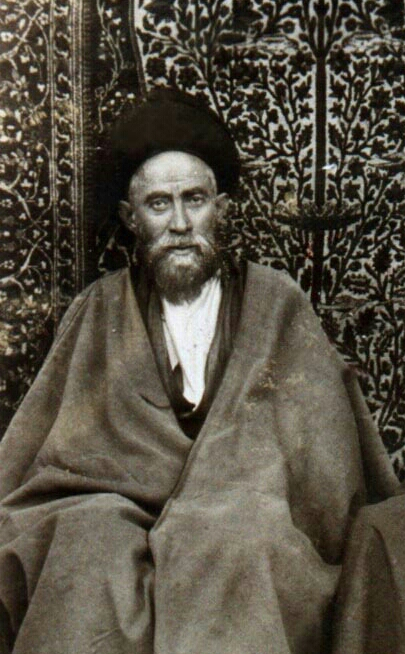
An image of the late Ayatollah Zarabdi

He trained numerous students in Qazvin, many of whom went on to teach in Tehran, Mashhad, and Qazvin itself. Among his pupils were Seyyed Abolhassan Hafeziyan, Ali-Akbar Elahiyan Tonekaboni, Mirza Rahim Samet, Mojtaba Qazvini Khorasani, Hashem Qazvini, and Mohammad-Ebrahim Mohaqqeq. Renowned as a master of the occult sciences, he also instructed students in this discipline, including Seyyed Abolhassan Hafeziyan and Ali-Akbar Elahiyan.

== See also ==
- List of deceased maraji
