= Mohammad Aghazadeh Khorasani =

Ayatollah (1877-1937)

- محمد آقازاده خراسانی
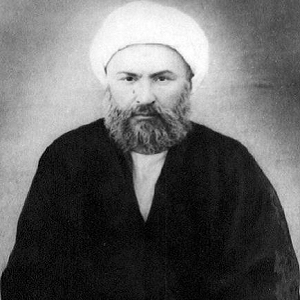
- Image of the late Ayatollah Sheikh Mohammad Aghazadeh Khorasani
- Born: 1877; Najaf, Ottoman Empire
- Died: 1937 (aged 59–60); Rey, Imperial State of Iran
- Resting place: Shah-Abdol-Azim shrine

Mohammad Aghazadeh Khorasani (Persian: محمد آقازاده خراسانی; born 1877 in Najaf, Ottoman Empire) was a Shia cleric, known for his scientific work published under pseudonyms such as Ayatollah Aghazadeh, Ayatollah Aghazadeh Najafi, or Ayatollah Aghazadeh Khorasani.

== Biography ==
At 30 years old, he attended master classes in the holy city of Najaf, and later, at the order of his father, moved to Mashhad.

He lived in Najaf for several years, where he studied among religious scholars, including Mohammad-Kazem Khorasani. He then moved back to Mashhad to teach jurisprudence. The most notable of his students were Mojtaba Qazvin, his brother Sheikh Hashem Qazvin, and Hadi Kadkani.

During the years he lived in Mashhad, in addition to political activities, teaching, and training students in his field, Khorasani was the head of the Khorasan Seminary.

== Political activity ==
Some of his activities:

- Opposition to the reign of Reza Shah
- Supporting the ulamas' opposition to the regime and its policies
- Criticizing the government for borrowing from foreign governments
- Dealing with the Democratic Party of Mashhad
- Involved with the Goharshad Mosque uprising that led to Reza Shah's exile in Yazd

He was sentenced to death by a military court for compulsory residence in Tehran provoking protests among Iraqi Scholars.

== Death ==
Khorasani died in 1937 in Rey, Iran, and his body was buried in the Shah-Abdol-Azim shrine in the garden of Parrot.

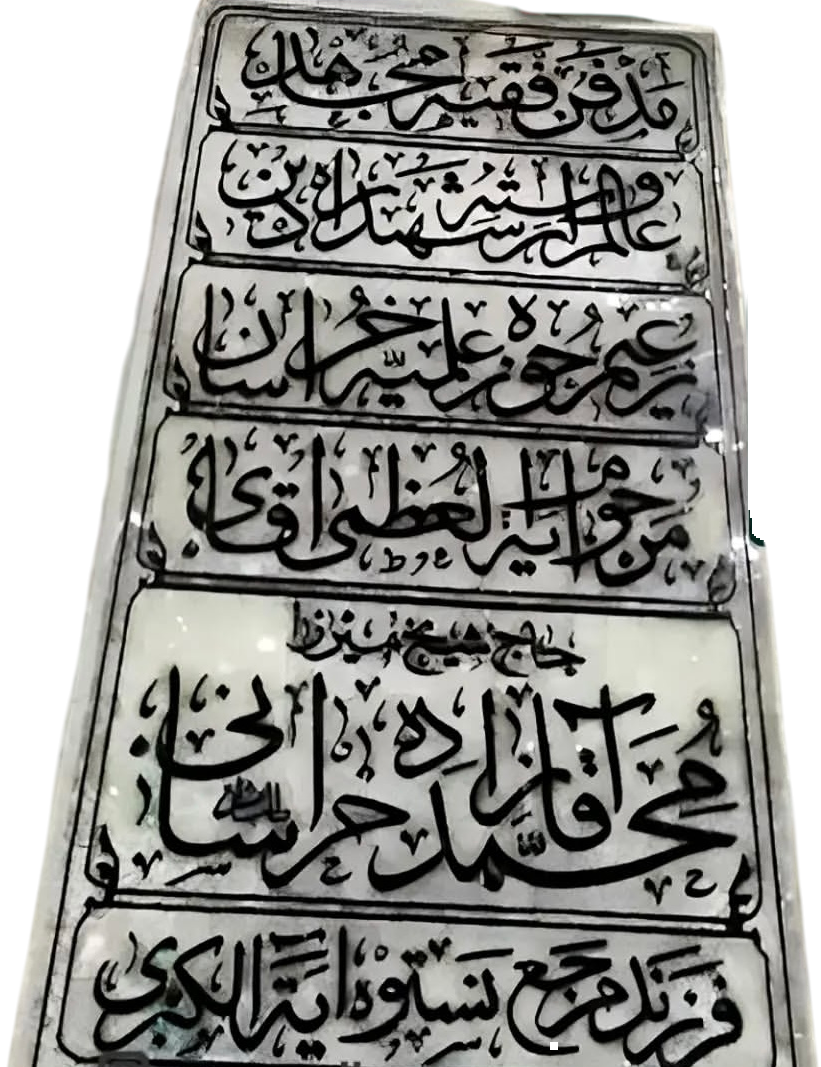

== See also ==
- Iranian Constitutional Revolution
- Intellectual movements in Iran
- Mirza Malkom Khan
- Mirza Hussein Naini
