= Rahim Arbab =

Iranian Islamic scholar

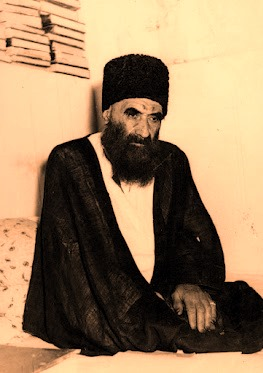
Rahim Arbab, early 1970s.

Haj Agha Rahim Arbab (1875–1975) was born in Chermahin in Iran, from Isfahan province, to a family of scholars. Haj agha Rahim Arbab is among the Islamic scholars who never wore the traditional turban. He believed that the turban is for prophets and that he did not possess the scholarly permission to wear a turban. All of his 50 students ranked as Ayatollah after graduation. Among them, Allameh Jalal Homaei, Reza Alishah Tabandeh and Ayatollah Mirdamadi are well known.

== Childhood ==
Haj Agha Arbab grew up in Chermahin, and nature and simple living had a very deep effect on the development of his philosophy and theology. He learned to read and write at the age of four and started reading Persian literature at that age. As is tradition, he started with learning Gulistan and Bostan, the two books of the great Persian poet Sadi, along with Qur'anic studies. When he was five his teachers sent him back to his father, Haj Arbab, who was a scholar himself, stating that he had mastered all of the required fields and knew those books by heart. They requested that he be sent to hawzeh (a high level school also known as Madrassa). This promise encouraged his parents to move to the city of Isfahan.

== Formal studies ==
Haj Agha Rahim Arbab started attending the classes required for the traditional schools at a very young age, along with his cousin, Mirza Abbas Khan Sheida, who was later known as Sheida-ye-Esfahani. He attended the Sadr Madrassa and finished his academic studies in jurisprudence (fiqh) and its principles (usul), theosophy (hekmat), and the other Islamic intellectual ('aqli) and transmitted (naqli) sciences, under the supervision of philosophers and scholars such as Jahangir Khan Ghashghaei and Ayatollah Akhond Kashi. Ayatollah Haj Agha Rahim Arbab showed extraordinary abilities in formal and informal studies such as Persian and Arabic literature, mathematics, philosophy, mysticism and astronomy. He graduated to the rank of Ayatollah when he was only fourteen.
