= Mir Asadollah Madani =

Iranian politician and Shia cleric (1914-1981)

- میر اسدالله مدنی
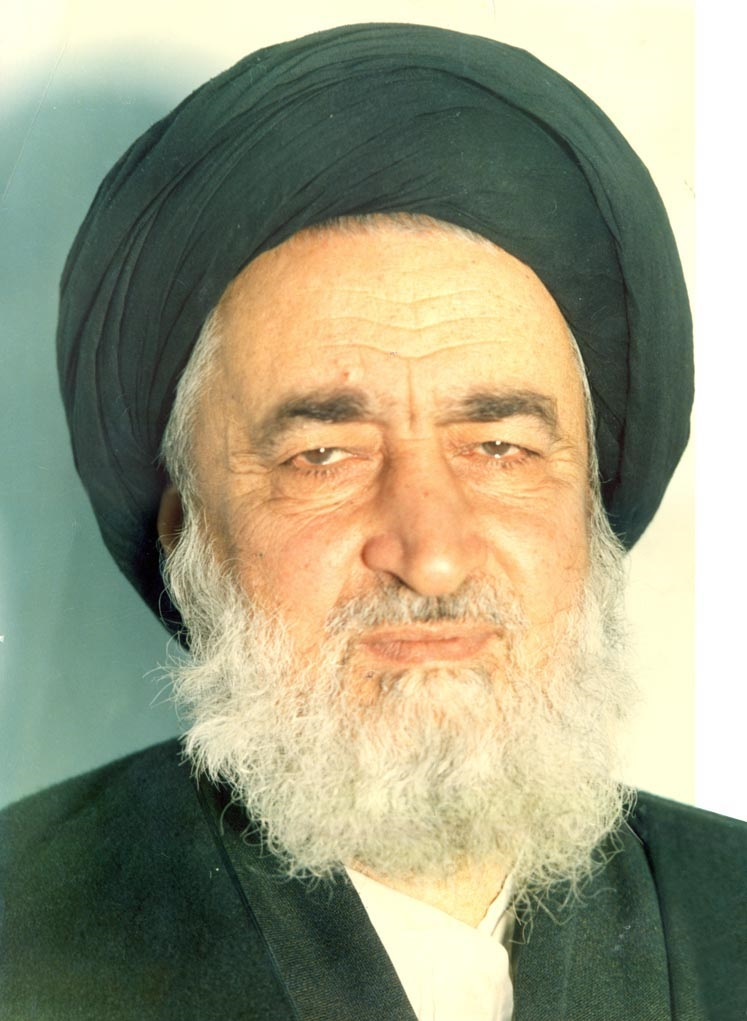

Personal life
- Born: 1914 Azarshahr, Iran
- Died: 11 September 1981 (aged 66–67) Tabriz, Iran
- Cause of death: Assassination (detonation of hand grenade)
- Resting place: Fatima Masumeh Shrine, Qom
- Education: Qom Hawza; Hawza of Najaf

Religious life
- Religion: Shia Islam
- Profession: Cleric; politician

Imam Jumu'ah of Tabriz
- In office 1981–1981
- Appointed by: Ruhollah Khomeini
- Preceded by: Mohammad-Ali Ghazi-Tabatabaei
- Succeeded by: Moslem Malakouti

Imam Jumu'ah of Hamadan
- In office 1979–1981

Member of the Assembly of Experts
- Constituency: Hamadan province

Mir Asadollah Madani Dehkharghani (Persian: میراسدالله مدنی) (1914 - 11 September 1981) was an Iranian politician and Shia cleric. He was the second Imam Jumu'ah of Tabriz, the Imam Jumu'ah of Hamadan, the representative of the Supreme Leader in East Azerbaijan for less than a year, and a member of the Muslim People's Republic Party. Madani was also Hamadan province's representative in the first term of the Assembly of Experts.

He was assassinated on 11 September 1981. According to Tehran radio, he was killed by a guerrilla with a grenade. Iranian government press sometimes refers to him as "the second martyr of Mihrab."

== Political activity ==
In 1970, Mir Asadollah Madani returned to Iran in opposition to the rule of Mohammad Reza Pahlavi. However, his actions resulted in him being exiled to Bandar Kangan. He was later arrested by SAVAK and was deported several times in the 1960s. He used SAVAK to escape the pressures of the religious spectrum in 1972, banishing him to the Valley Moradbeik around Hamedan. After the 1979 Iranian Revolution, he was appointed the Imam of Tabriz.

== Assassination ==
On 11 September 1981, at the end of the Friday prayer, Madani was approached by an unknown man. The man then detonated a grenade that was hidden under his clothes, which led to the death of Mir Asadollah Madani and three others, as well as leaving 50 people injured. Madani was killed in a mihrab and hence acquired the title "the second martyr of Mihrab," the first one being Ali ibn Abi Talib who was also assassinated while praying.

== Commemorations ==
In his honor, several facilities have been named, as follows:

- Azarbaijan Shahid Madani University, a public university in his hometown
- Shahid Madani Metro Station, a station on the Tehran Metro Line 2
- Shahid Madani of Tabriz International Airport
- Operation Shahid Madani, an operation launched by the Islamic Republic of Iran Army in the Iran–Iraq War (1982)
- Shahid Madani Dam in Tabriz
- Shahid Madani Heart Hospital in Tabriz
- Shahid Madani Hospital in Khorramabad

Political offices
Preceded by Mohammad-Ali Ghazi-Tabatabaei	Imam Jumu'ah of Tabriz; 1981–1981	Succeeded by Moslem Malakouti
