= Muhammad Baqir Sharif Tabatabae =

Iranian Islamic scholar (1823–1901)

Mohammad Bagher Sharif Tabatabayi
- Born: 14 October 1823; Isfahan, Qajar Iran
- Died: 5 November 1901 (aged 78); Jandagh, Qajar Iran

Mirza Muhammad Bagher Sharif Tabatabaei (Persian: محمد باقر شریف طباطبایی; 1823–1901) was an Iranian Islamic scholar.

He studied Islamic disciplines under the guidance of his father and scholars such as ‘Allama Bahr al-‘Ulum, Shaykh Ja’far Kashif al-Ghita’, Agha Muhammad Bagher Hizarjaribi, and Mir ‘Abd al-Baghi Isfahani in Karbala.

== Biography ==
Mirza Muhammad Baqir was born in the village Qehi near Isfahan. His father, Mulla Muhammad Jafar was an admirer of Shaykh Ahmad Ahsaei Ala Maqami. After learning the basics from his father, Baqir travelled to Isfahan to continue his education, residing at the Nimavar School where he studied different sciences for several years. After the Wahhabi attack on Karbala in 1802, he moved to Iran and enrolled at the Islamic seminary of Isfahan, initially staying with his uncle, Aqa Muhammad ‘Ali Kirmanshahi. He spent 13 years teaching and writing in Isfahan, during which he authored his most well-known work, Mafatih al-usul. In 1845, Baqir traveled to Yazd in the hope of meeting Kermani, who was passing through on his way to Mashhad. Due to changes in travel plans, Baqir instead accompanied him back to Kerman, where he continued his theological studies at the Ibrahimieh School.

Kermani assigned Baqir to Naein to preach. There, Baqir spent several years involved in religious teaching and outreach among followers of Shaykhism in Naein, Anarak, Jandaq, Biabanak, and nearby areas. When he finished his stay in Nairn, he returned to Kerman, where he remained until Kermani left for a pilgrimage to Karbala in 1866. When they arrived in Hamedan, they found a number of Sheikhieh adherents, but also a lack of leaders due to the demise of Mullah Abdulsamad Hamedani. Kermani appointed Baqir as a leader, and continued his pilgrimage to Karbala.

Baqir remained in Hamedan for 32 years, engaging in religious instruction and community leadership. He continued this role following Kermani's death. Due to unrest in Hamedan in 1897, Baqir relocated to Jandaq, where he lived until his death.

Mirza Muhammad Baqir died on the night of 5 November 1901. He was initially buried in Jandaq, but his remains were later transferred to Mashhad, where he was reburied at the Imam Reza Shrine complex.
