= Seyyed Mohammad Taqi Ghazanfari =

Seyyed Mohammad Taqi Ghazanfari (Persian: سید محمدتقی غضنفری) (April 1886 – March 1971) was a Shia jurist of the fourteenth century AH. He was born in May 1882 AD in Khansar. He was one of the first people who stood in the contemporary period for Friday Prayers.

== Early life ==
His father, Seyyed Hashim Mousavi Khansari, was a recognized scholar in Borujerd and Isfahan seminaries. Professors included Seyed Mahmoud Tabatabai Boroujerdi and Seyed Mirza Muhammad Taqi, due to the seventh Shiite imam Musa al-Kazim.

=== Education ===
He finished his primary education in his hometown of Khansar. He studied under Seyyed Mohammad Taqi Khansari and Seyed Mahmoud Ibn al-Reza Khansari. He traveled to Najaf for further study with Abdul-Karim Ha'eri Yazdi, Muhammad Hossein Naini, Abu l-Hasan al-Isfahani and Sayyid Abu Turab Khansari. He traveled to Qom and the pilgrimage threshold Fātimah bint Mūsā visiting holy shrines, and clerics including Shahab al-Din Marashi Najafi and Mohammad Kazem Shariatmadari.

== Accomplishments ==
- Khansar renew religious site
- Rebuild the Dorah mosque Khansar
- Saqakhaneh building in Khansar
- Renew two bathrooms for men and women

== Family ==
=== Children ===
- Seyyed Mehdi Ghazanfari
- Seyed Mohammad Hashemi Ghazanfari
- Seyyed Reza Ghazanfari
- Vajiehossadat Ghazanfari

=== Grandchildren ===
- Ismail Ghazanfari
- Seyyed Mohammad Ghazanfari
- Aqa Seyyed Hadi Ghazanfari Khansari
- Seyyed Mohsen Ghazanfari
- Syed Taqi Ghazanfari
- Seyed Jafar Ghazanfari

== Death ==
Mohammad Taqi Khansari died in March 1971 after a lifetime of religious service in Khansar.
