= Mohammad-Taqi Ja'fari =

Iranian Islamic scholar (1923–1998)

Mohammad-Taqi Ja'fari محمّدتقی جعفری
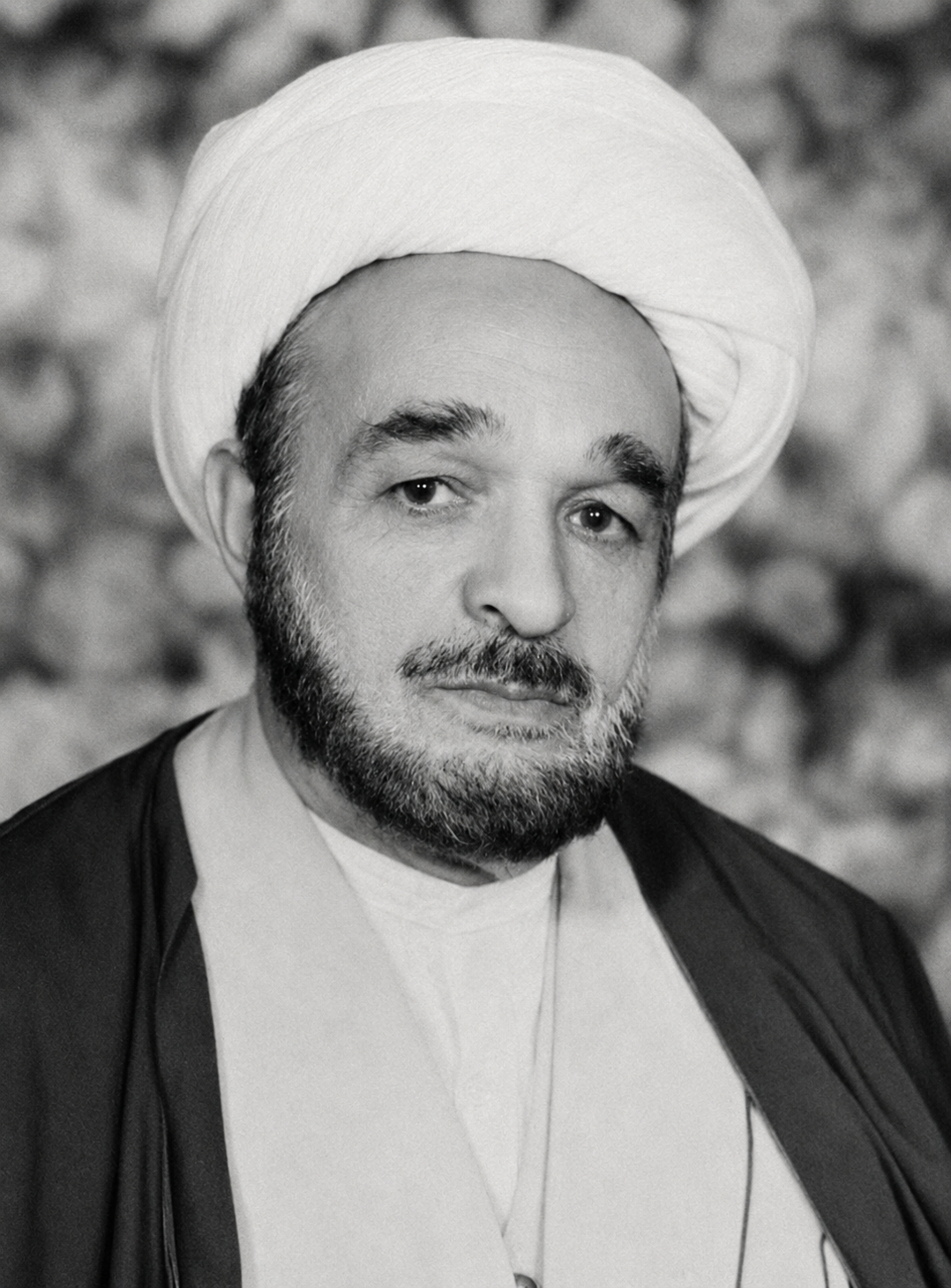
- Allameh Mohammad-Taqi Ja'fari
- Title: Allameh

Personal life
- Born: 24 July 1923 Tabriz, Iran
- Died: 16 November 1998 (aged 75)
- Other name: Persian: محمّدتقی جعفری
- Website: The Ostad Jafari Institute

Religious life
- Religion: Shia Islam (Usuli Twelver)

Allameh Mohammad-Taqi Ja'fari (Persian: علّامه محمّدتقی جعفری) (24 July 1923 – 16 November 1998) was an Iranian scholar, philosopher, intellectual, and islamic theologist. Ja'fari was a Shia philosopher. He was considered an expert in history, metaphysics, philosophy, literature, mysticism, jurisprudence, and philosophy of science.

== Biography ==
Mohammad-Taki Ja'fari was born on 1923 in Tabriz, Iran. He graduated from elementary studies in Tabriz and continued his education in the Talebieh Seminary. Mohammad-Taghi then went to Qom and Tehran Seminaries for benefiting from religious scholars of the time. Thereafter he left Iran for 11 years to attend the School of Theology in Najaf. He achieved his Ijtihad degree when he was 23 years old. Ja'fari returned to Iran and taught in Qom and Tehran.

== Works ==
- Interpretation and Criticism of Rumi's Masnavi (15 volumes)
- Translation and Interpretation of the Nahj al-Balagha (27 volumes)
- Pioneer Culture to the Rescue of Mankind
- The Mystery of Life
- The Conscience
- Positive Mysticism
- Imam Hossein's Prayers at the Arafat Desert (Arabic)
- The Coordination between Science & Religion (Arabic)
- The Conscience
- Religion and Moral Ethics
- Mabda' A'ala
- From One Sea to Another (An Index to the Mathnavi, 4 volumes)
- Four Poets – Hafez, Saadi Shirazi, Omar Khayyam and Nizami Ganjavi
- An Analysis of Omar Khayyam's Personality
- An Interpretation, Review and Analysis of Rumi's Masnavi
- Rumi and Ideologies
- What Makes Rumi's Words So Fascinating
- The Relationship between Man and the Universe
- Ideals of Life and the Ideal Life
- Philosophy and Aim of Life
- Man and Creation
- Man in Elevating, Evolution Life
- Man Seen in the Koran
- Motion and change as seen in the koran
- A Study and Critique of David Hume's Thoughts on Four Philosophical Issues
- A Study and Critique of the Russell-Wyatt Dialog
- A Study and Critique of Selected Thoughts of Bertrand Russell
- A Study and Critique of The Adventures of Ideas
- Human Rights from Islamic and Western Viewpoints
- Islam's Political Philosophy
- Mysticism and Gnostics
- Positive Mysticism
- A Legal and Jurisprudential Study of the Human Genome Project
- Speculative (Systematic) Theology and Its Modern Forms
- Fatalism and Free Will
- The Philosophy of Religion
- Jurisprudential Sources
- Al-reza'a
- Worship and Wisdom in Islamic Jurisprudence
- Ta'avon –uddin val-elm
- Nahayat-ol-edrak al-vaqe'ee bain-ol-phalsafat-ol-qadima va al-hadisa
- A Study of the Philosophy of Science
- Science and Religion in Reasonable Life
- Recognition and Knowledge Seen in Science and the Quran
- Al-amr Bain-ol-amrain
- Fatalism and Free Will
- The Philosophy of Religion
- Imam Hossein's Prayers at the Arafat Desert
- Imam Hossein, the Martyr of Human Pioneer Culture
- A Complete Translation of the Nahj-ol-balaqeh
- The Exploration of Thoughts (2 volumes)
- In Presence of Wisdom
- Reasonable Life
- A Compilation of Articles
- The Message of Wisdom
- Pioneer Culture to the Rescue of Mankind
- The Mystery of Life
- A Plan for Cultural Revolution

== Death ==
Mohammad-Taqi Ja'fari died in London on 16 November 1998 and was buried in Mashhad in the vicinity of Imam Reza Shrine.
