= Lists of maraji =

Maraji are the supreme legal authority for Twelver Shia Muslims. The following articles contain lists of maraji.

- List of current maraji
- List of deceased maraji

== See also ==
- Marja'
- Ijtihad
- Hawza
- Risalah (fiqh)
- List of ayatollahs
- List of hujjatul Islams
