= Marashi (disambiguation) =

Marashis were a Muslim dynasty ruling in Mazandaran from 1359 to 1596.

Marashi may also refer to:

== Places ==
- Marashi, Iran, a village in Veys Rural District, Veys District, Bavi County, Khuzestan Province, Iran.
- Mar'ashi Najafi library, large Islamic library in Iran
- Kharab Al Marashi District, a district of the Al Jawf Governorate, Yemen

== People ==
- Marashi (surname), a family name indicating ancestry from Ali al-Marash, the grandson of the fourth Shia imam, Ali ibn Husayn, also known as Zayn al-Abidin.
- Shah Ahmad Marashi, Safavid Iranian Shah from 1726 to 1728
- Shahab ud-Din Mar'ashi Najafi Iranian-Iraqi Shia Cleric
- Effat Marashi, wife of Iranian politician and former president Akbar Hashemi Rafsanjani
- Hossein Marashi (born 1958), Iranian politician
- Ibrahim al-Marashi, American political science lecturer, writer, professor
- Mahmoud Mar'ashi Najafi, Iranian Shia Cleric
- Mehrzad Marashi (born 1980), Iranian-German singer and winner of season 7 of Deutschland sucht den Superstar
- Ndue Marashi, Albanian politician and mayor of Tirana

== See also ==
Marash
