= Seyyed Hassan Eslami Ardakani =

Iranian cleric and philosopher

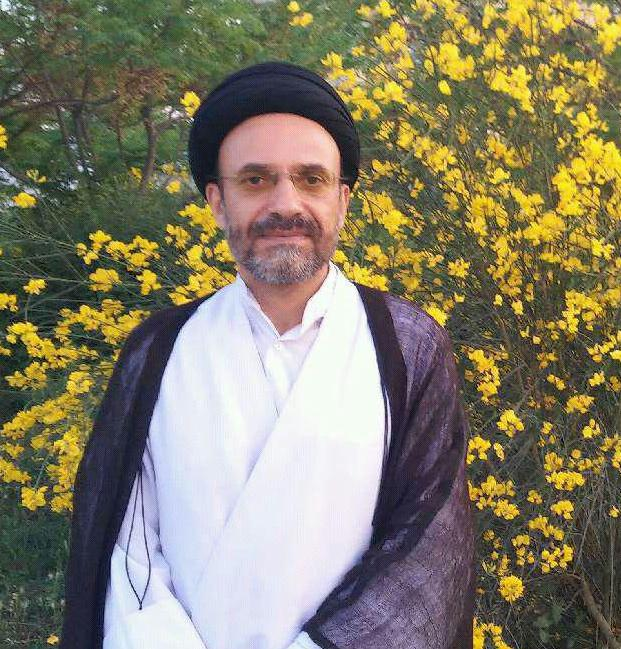
- Born: December 23, 1960 (age 65); Karbala
- Awards: Farabi Award

Education
- Education: University of Qom (PhD); Qom Seminary

Philosophical work
- Era: 21st-century philosophy
- Region: Western philosophy Islamic philosophy
- School: virtue ethics
- Institutions: University of Religions and Denominations
- Main interests: research ethics environmental ethics

Seyyed Hassan Eslami Ardakani (born December 23, 1960) is an Iranian philosopher and professor of ethics at the University of Religions and Denominations. He is known for his expertise on virtue ethics, environmental ethics and research ethics. Eslami is a winner of Farabi International Award for his book Human Cloning in Catholic and Islamic Perspectives.

== Books ==
- Human Cloning in Catholic and Islamic Perspectives, University of Religions and Denominations, 2007
- Ethics of Critique, Maaref, 2004
- Muhammad: Prophet of Compassion, Khorram, 1997

== See also ==
- Mahmoud Mar'ashi Najafi
- Ahmad Vaezi
