= Bustan Ketab =

Iranian publishing company

Bustan Ketab Publishing (Persian: بوستان کتاب) is an Iranian publisher established by Qom hawza.

== Overview ==
Bustan Ketab Publishing was established in 1982. Since then Bustan Ketab has published titles in Islam.
