= Morashi =

Morashi (Persian: مرعشی), also Marashi, is a given name of Iranian origin meaning ‘happy-one’ possibly indicating ancestry from Ali al-Marash, the grandson of the fourth Shia imam, Ali ibn Husayn, also known as Zayn al-Abidin. The name is generally associated with a clan of Shi'ite Muslims who are descended from Ali ibn Husayn, who himself was a great-grandson of the Islamic prophet Muhammad. Today, about 2,000,000 members of the Marashi clan are mostly found in Iran, Türkie, Iraq, Syria, Kashmir and the UAE.

== See also ==
- Marash
- Marashi (disambiguation)
- Sayyid
- Zayn al-Abidin (disambiguation)
- Amol
- Mir-i Buzurg
- Qazi Nurullah Shustari
- Mar'ashi Najafi library
- Hossein Marashi
- Effat Marashi
- Ibrahim al-Marashi
- Sayyid Salabat Khan Zulfiqar Jang
