= Islamic Sciences and Culture Academy =

Islam academic research institute

- Parent institution: Islamic Propagation Office of Qom seminary
- President: Najaf Lakzaee
- Location: (Baqir al-Olum University), Daneshgah Blvd, Pardisan, Qom, Iran
- Coordinates: 34.637907°N 50.875964°E
- Interactive map of Islamic Sciences and Culture Academy

The Islamic Sciences and Culture Academy (ISCA) is a scientific and research academy of Islamic sciences. It is affiliated to the Islamic Propagation Office of Qom Seminary. The academy alongside Baqir al-Olum University formed the research and education departments of the Islamic Propagation Office of the seminary. Najaf Lakzaee, a lecturer of political studies and the research deputy of the Islamic Propagation Office of Qom seminary is the president of the Academy.

The academy has held more 19 international conferences and 46 national conferences.

== History ==
This academy was formerly the research department of the Islamic Propagation Office of Qom Seminary. It was formed after the organization of other research academies and institutes in 2001. Finally, in 2005 in the supreme council for expansion of the ministry of Science, Research and Technology, four research centers were approved and the license of the Islamic Sciences and Culture Academy was granted.

== The Institution ==
Islamic Sciences and Culture Academy have 4 main centers; Center for Theoretical and the Solid System of Islamic and Human Sciences, Center for Deepening Religious Faith and Fighting against Deviant Movements and Sects, Center for Ethics, Family and Lifestyle, Center for Political and Social System of Islam and Iran. The academy is made up of 13 specialized departments for educative programs and researches

Research centres
- Research Center for Ahlulbayt History and Conducts
- Research Centers for Political Sciences and Thought
- Research Centers for Fiqh(Islamic Jurisprudence) and Law
- Research Centers for Islamic Philosophy and Theology
- Research Center for Mahdiism and Future Studies (Futurology)
- Research Center for Islamic Documents and Information Management
- Research Center for Quranic Sciences and Culture
- Research Center for Ethics and Spirituality
- Research Center for Civilizational Islam
- Research Center for Theology and Family
- Center for Reviving of Islamic Works
- Center for Islamic Studies of Society and Civilization
Research departments
- Organizing Information & Documents
- Information and Knowledge Dissemination
- Comparative Theology
- Social Ethics
- Family Studies
- Codicology Bibliography and Islamic Works Revival and Correction
- Civilizational Studqies
- Socio-cultural Studies
- Jurisprudence and Legal Issues
- Applied Jurisprudence
- Wisdom and New Theology
- Qur'an and Social Studies
- Islamic Art and Civilization
- Political Philosophy
- Political Jurisprudence
- Political Sciences
- Compilation of Knowledge Structures
- The Study of Mahdiism movements
- Religion Futurology and Religiosity
- Philosophy
- Theology
- Philosophy of Ethics
- Ethics
- Education
- Islam and Spirituality Studies
- The Philosophy of Jurisprudence and Law
- Jurisprudence-related knowledge
- Encyclopedias
- Dictionaries
- Exegesis of the Holy Qur'an
- Qur'anic Sciences
- Comparative Studies
- Shiite History
- Conduct of Ahlulbayt (Peace be upon them)
- Islamic Culture and Civilization
- The Encyclopedia of Ahlulbayt (Peace be upon them)
- Mahdiism studies
- Studies of social justice

== Faculty Members and Researchers ==
- Number of full-time faculty members: more than 100
- Number of part-time faculty members: 7
- Number of full-time researchers: more than 40
- Number of project-based researchers: more than 300

== Research Projects ==
- Published: 858 research projects
- In progress: 591 research projects

== Some of the Most Important Research Projects ==
- Encyclopedias

Published: 10

In progress: 11

- Thesauruses

Published: 11

In progress: 6

- Lexicons

Published: 13

In progress: 4

- Mawsu'ats (A series of works)

Published: 9

In progress: 10

== Macro-Projects ==
Published: 36

In progress: 34

== Translations ==
41 volumes in partnership with Center of Civilization for Islamic Thought Development, Islamic Culture and Relations Organization, Dar Al maaref Alhikmiah and Al-Hadaf Center.

== Libraries ==
Number of libraries: Nine.

Number of books: 235,500 titles and 383,091 volumes

== Publications ==
1184 volumes (596 volumes in ISCA's Press, 471 volumes in Bustan Kitab Press, 112 volumes in Isfahan Branch Press and 5 works in partnership with Samt Publication).

== Electronic Publishing ==
Over 3500 books and journals from national and international publishers. Publishing all the books and journals of ISCA and Islamic Propagation Office of Qom Seminary simultaneously in Pajoohaan Mobile Bookreader.

== Journals ==
14 journals

- Pajooheshhaye Qur'ani (Qur'anic Research)
- Islam wa Motaleaate Ijtemaeie (Islam and Social Studies)
- Motale'ate Siasi Eslami (Political- Islamic Studies) in English and Arabic
- Kavoshi No Dar Fiqh (A New Exploration in Jurisprudence)
- Naqd va Nazar (Review and Comment)
- Pajooheshhaye Aqli Novin(new intellectual research)
- Akhlaq (Ethics)
- Howzeh
- Modiriate Daneshe Eslami( Islamic Knowledge Management)
- Motaleate Adabie Motoone Eslami (Literary Studies of Islamic Texts)
- Sirah Pajoohi Ahl al- Bayt ( studies on conduct of Ahl al- Bayt)
- Noqalam
- Ayeneh-E-Pazhoohesh (Mirror of Research)
- Journal of Islam's Political Studies (in English)

== Websites and Software Products ==
- The Comprehensive Portal for Quranic Sciences and Knowledge
- Islamic Sciences Information Management System
- The Portal of Journals
- The Digital Library
- The Encyclopedia of Ahlul al-Bayt (pbut)
- Islamic Sciences Wiki

== Mobile Applications ==
- Quran Siraj
- The Encyclopedia of the Holy Quran
- The Dictionary of the Holy Quran
- Quranic Questions
- Pajoohaan Bookreader
- Thematic Dictionaries and Encyclopedias of the Qur'an in 20 topics (Resistance, progress model, ethics, family, politics, security and information, history and A'alam, jurisprudence and law, spirituality, art, Islamic theology, jihad and martyrdom, social and civilizational studies, management, environment, The second Phase of the Revolution of Iran, economy, hajj, ifaf and hijab, health).

== Scientific Sessions and Meetings ==
- Critical and promotional sessions: 502 sessions
- Scientific meetings: 1534 meetings
- Specialized sessions: 3 sessions

== Scientific Cooperation ==
Number of National and International Scientific Cooperation: 138

== Memorandums of understanding ==
- National MoUs: 96
- International MoUs: 12

== Board of Honors ==
- Top research institute in the 4th Farabi International Festival
- The selected Publisher in 8 rounds of Islamic Republic of Iran Seminary Year Book Festival
- Gaining the first place in holding critical and promotional sessions among educational and research centers and institutes in 2017
- Number of selected works in Farabi International Festival: 5 works
- Number of selected works in Islamic Republic of Iran Year Book Festival: 17 works

== Other Festivals ==
More than 200 works have been selected in different festivals.
