= Qom Seminary =

Islamic seminary in Qom, Iran

- حوزه علمیه قم (Persian) حوزة قم (Arabic)
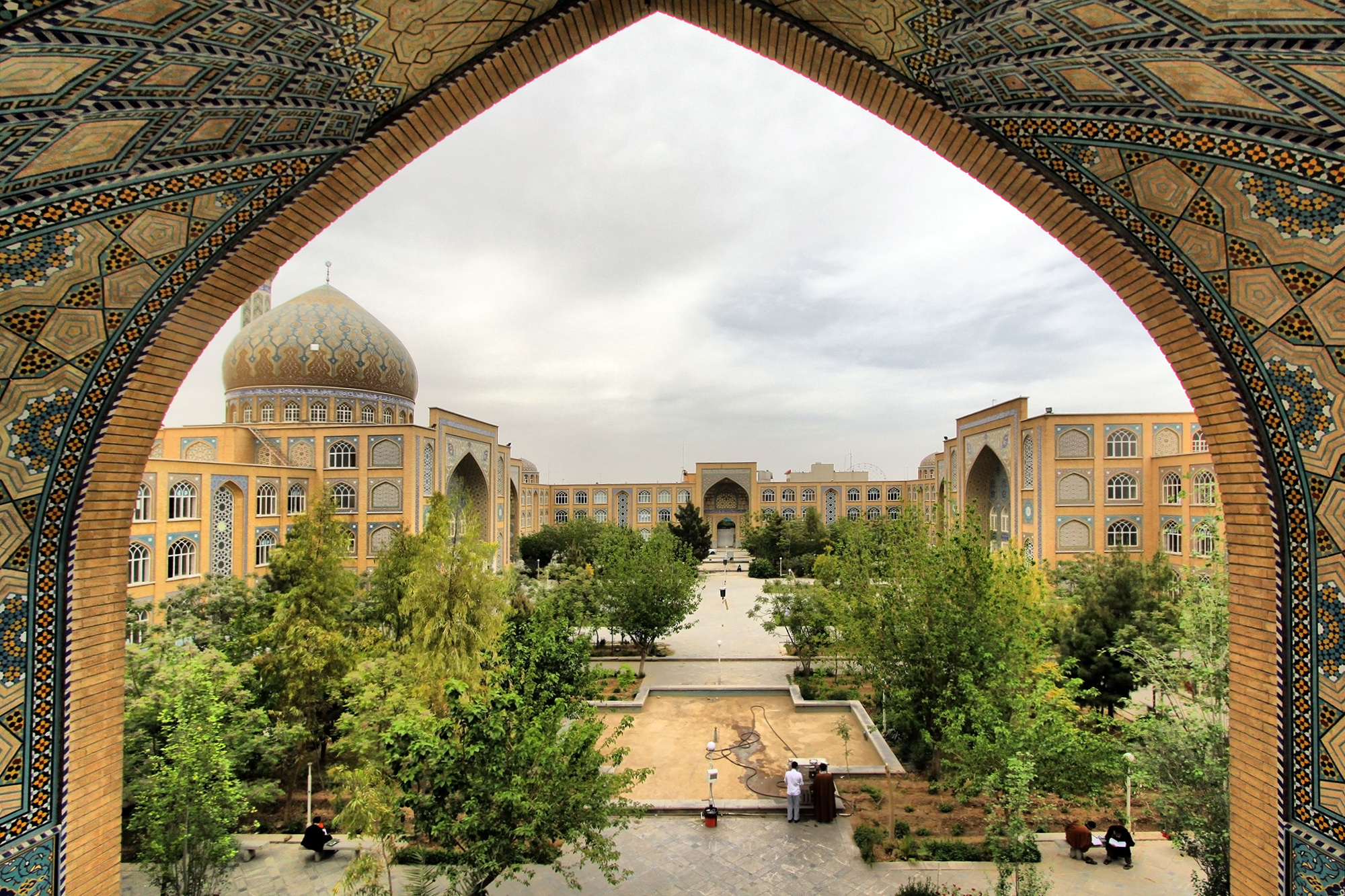
- Other name: Hawza 'Ilmiyya
- Type: Hawza
- Established: 1922
- Founder: Abdolkarim Haeri Yazdi
- Religious affiliation: Twelver Shia Islam
- Dean: Alireza Arafi
- Location: Zaer Blvd, Qom, JVVJ+C5G, Iran; 34°38′36″N 50°52′49″E
- Campus: Urban
- Language: Persian, Arabic
- Website: www.ismc.ir
- Location within Iran

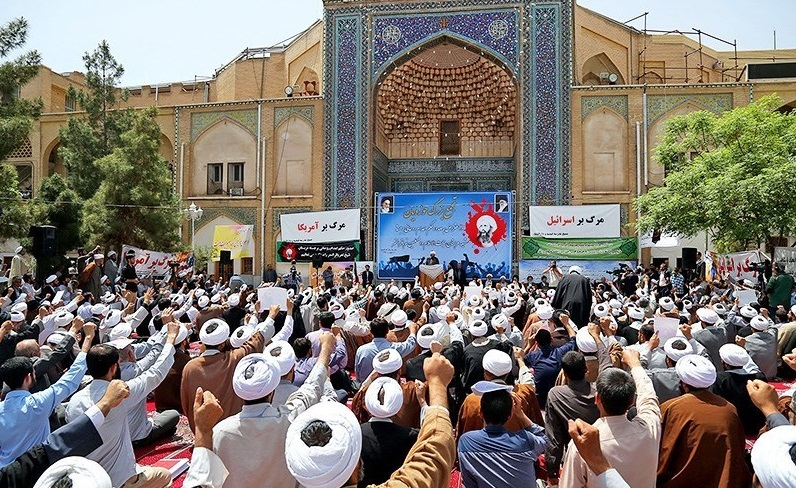
Qom Seminary

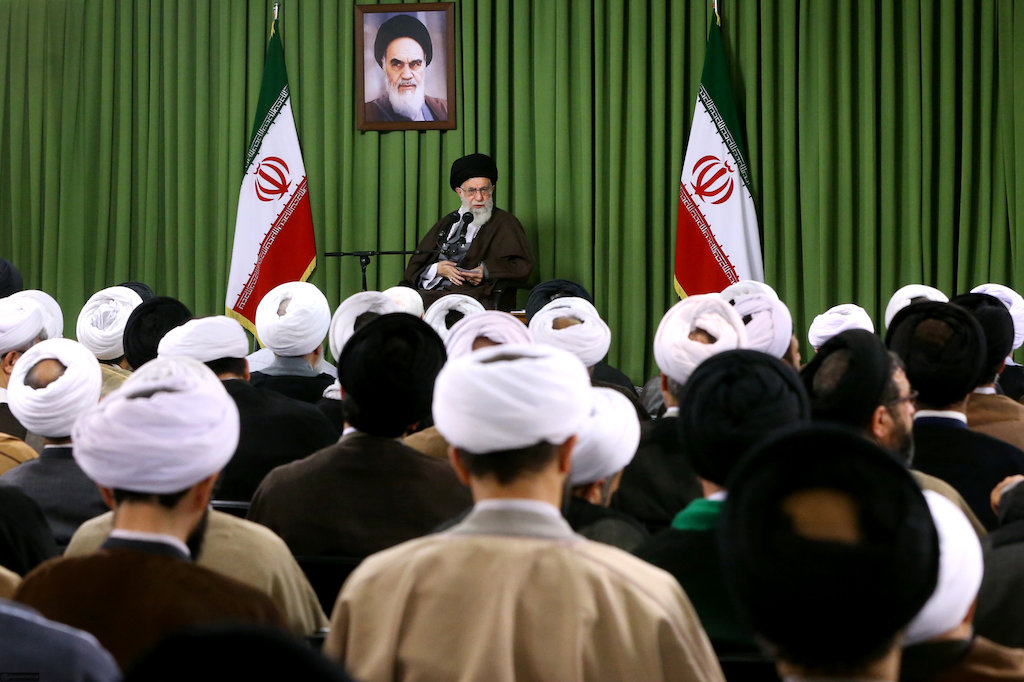
Iran's supreme leader Ali Khamenei at the Qom Seminary, March 2016

The Qom Seminary (Persian: حوزه علمیه قم, romanized: Ḥowze-ye ʿelmiyye-ye Qom) is the largest and one of the foremost Shia hawzas (Islamic seminaries), located in the city of Qom, Iran. It is the largest seminary in Iran, established in 1922 by Grand Ayatollah Abdul-Karim Haeri Yazdi in Qom to train Usuli scholars. The Hawza is composed of several structured institutions and systems developed to govern itself. Its curriculum includes Arabic grammar, rhetoric, Quranic studies, theology, and traditional sciences. Along with Kufa and Baghdad, the Qom hadith school is among the three earliest centers of hadith transmission in Shia intellectual history.

The seminary's history dates back to the founding of Shia Qom, when the Ash'ari family—a Shia clan—migrated from Kufa to Qom and contributed to the development of the city. Once they gained control over Qom, the propagation of Shiism and teaching of hadith and the Qur'an began. This continued with the arrival of agents and descendants of the Imams of Shia Islam, who played a substantial role in establishing and expanding the seminary.

Its influence waned under Sunni reign during the rise of the Seljuk Empire, and was further diminished during the Mongol invasion of the Khwarazmian Empire. During the Safavid era, it likely regained notability along with the seminaries of Isfahan and Qazvin. Among its faculty in this era were scholars such as Sheikh Baha'i and Mulla Sadra. In the Qajar era, the establishment of major schools like Feyziyeh School in Qom further strengthened the seminary.

Eventually, with renewed efforts to revitalize the seminary in the Qajar era, Yazdi migrated to Qom and founded the modern seminary. It became the most active seminary in the history of Shia Islam in Qom, later becoming a primary center of Shia scholarship in the Islamic world. After Yazdi, three of his students, followed by Hossein Borujerdi, led the seminary.

== History ==
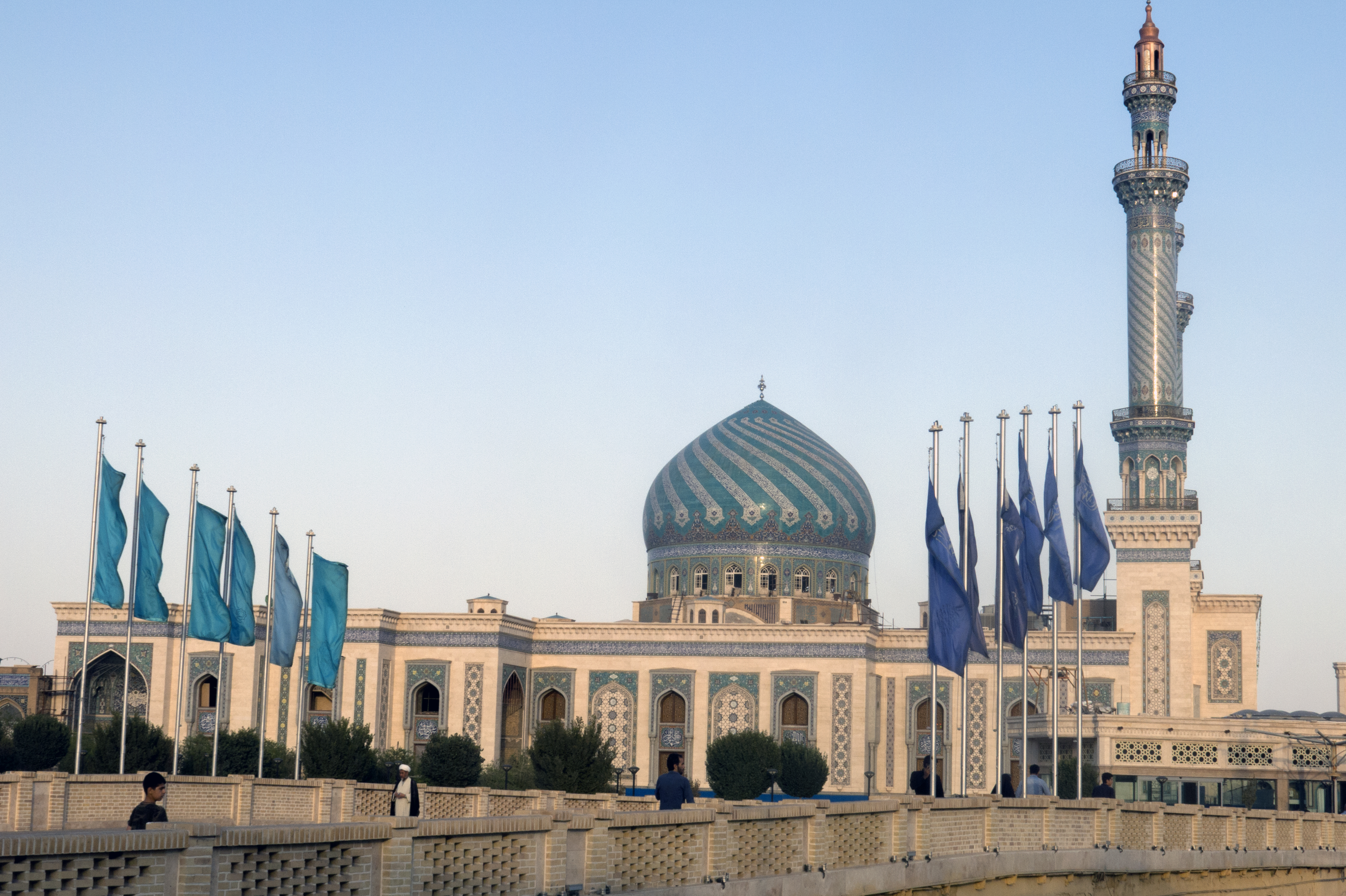
Imam Hasan Askari Mosque, reportedly established by the Ash'ari family in Qom

The city of Qom was conquered by Muslims between 643–644 CE, during the final year of the life of Umar ibn al-Khattab. In 670–719 CE, conditions emerged for the foundation of Shia Qom. The Twelve Imams spoke of a flourishing religious center in Qom.

Ja'far al-Sadiq is reported to have said: "Soon Kufa will be empty of believers, and knowledge will be withdrawn like a serpent withdrawing into its lair, and it will reappear in a city called Qom, which will become the center of knowledge and virtue..." Qom came to be known as the "nest of the Ahl al-Bayt." The presence of numerous Sayyids and Alids helped expand the seminary, as did the Shrine of Fatima Masumeh, which became a frequented site for pilgrimage.

=== Background ===
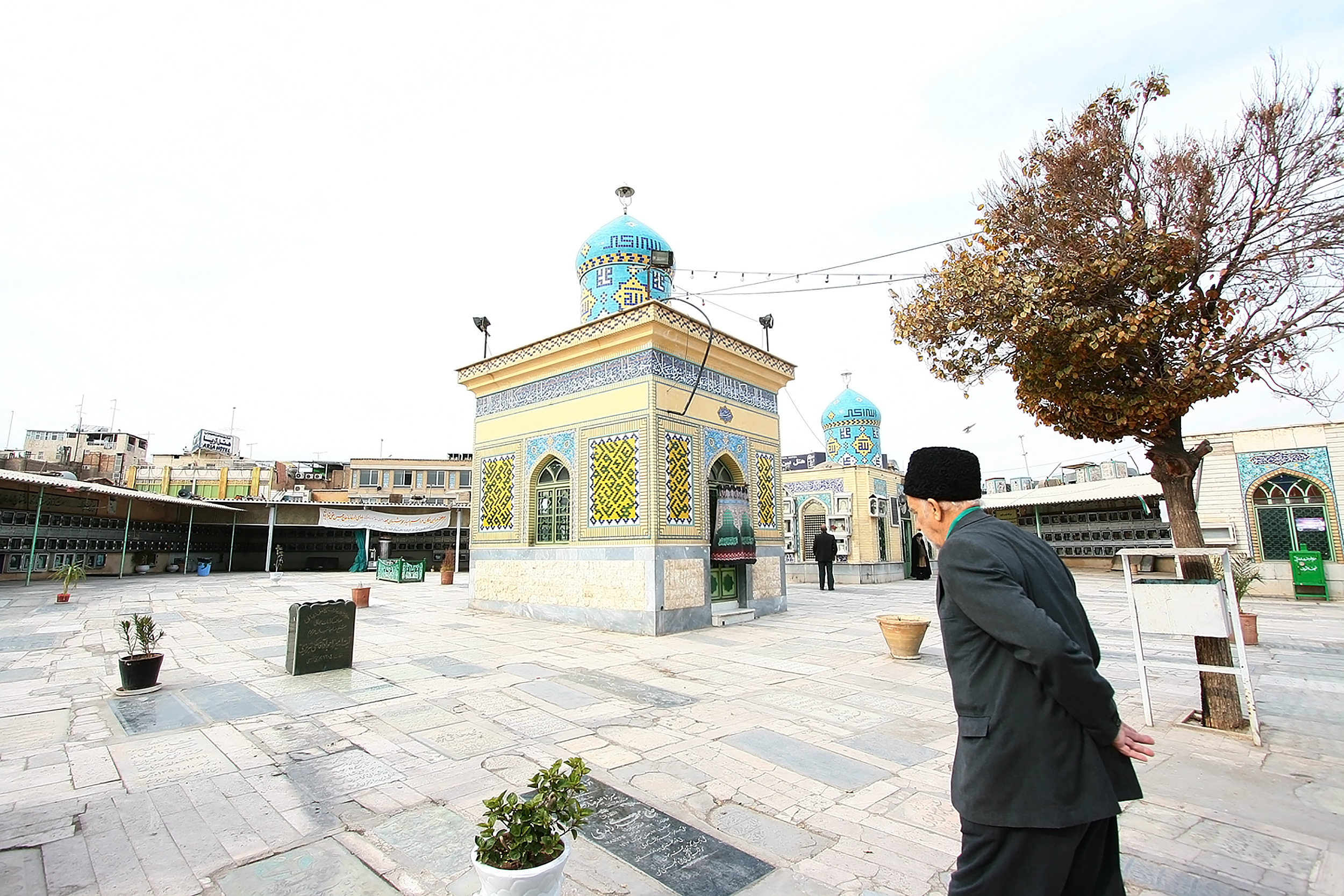
Sheikhan Cemetery in Qom, Iran, near the shrine of Fatimah al-Masumah, where members of the Ash'ari family are buried.

'Hawza' is a modern term for the organized institutions and centers of Shia Islamic education. Educational institutions in Twelver Shia Islam began during the time of the Twelve Imams, who held classes and transmitted knowledge rooted in the Qur'an and the Prophet's tradition. These teachings were compiled in works later known as Usul and taught in various Shia cities. Due to its distance from Sunni centers like Damascus and Baghdad, and its proximity to the Shia hub of Karaj Abū Dulaf, Qom became a conducive environment for Shia scholarship. Shiites from Kufa brought knowledge here, including Ibrahim ibn Hashim Kufi—the first to bring hadiths of Kufic scholars to Qom.

Abbas Feyz notes that during the uprising of Abu Muslim Khorasani, Qom became a stronghold of Twelver Shiism, and the first formal Twelver school was opened there by Ash'ari Sayyids. Scholars of the Daylamites emerged from this school—one of whom became a tutor to the Abbasid caliph al-Mutawakkil's children, and reportedly killed one of them after an insult made in reference to Fatima.

Hadith study increased in practice in Qom during the 8th–11th centuries CE. As hadiths were being transmitted in Kufa and Medina, they were also compiled and refined in Qom. Scholars like Ibrahim ibn Hashim and Muhammad ibn Khalid al-Barqi led this process. Over 80% of the sources in Al-Kafi by al-Kulayni are Qomi, with many from Ibrahim ibn Hashim. Ibn Babawayh, a recognized figure of this tradition, authored many works in hadith, jurisprudence, and theology based on narrations.

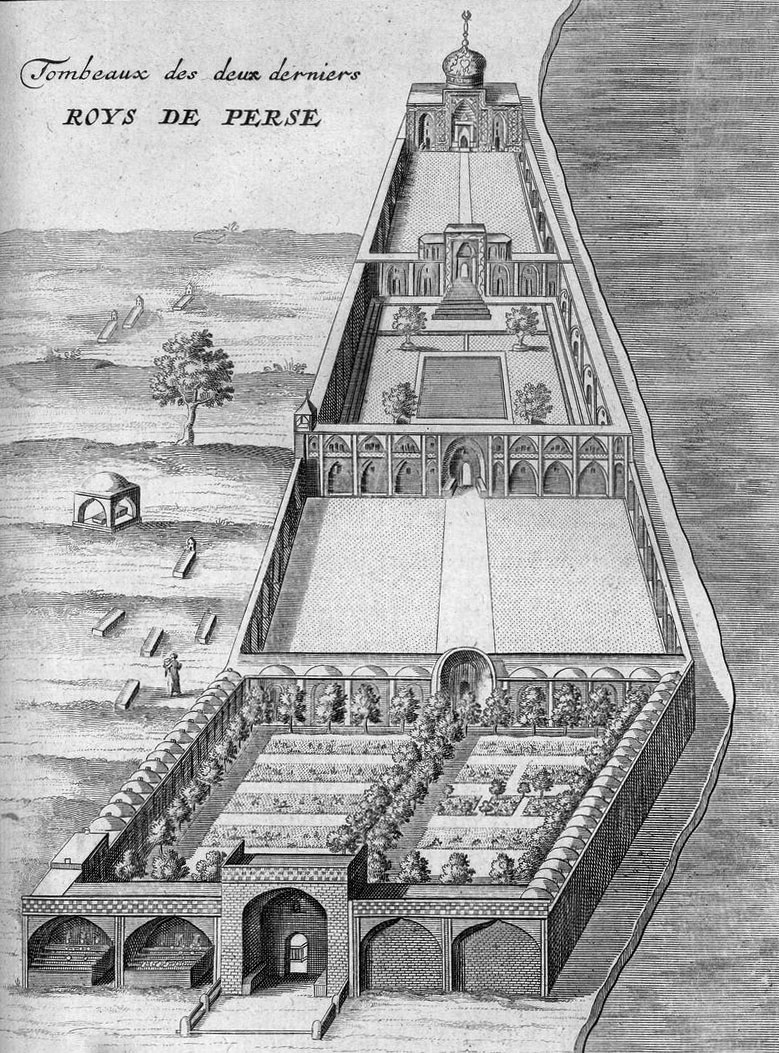
Shrine of Fatimah al-Masumah beside the Feyziyeh School during the Safavid era by Jean Chardin, 1739

=== Seljuk Era ===
Qom was a hub for Shia jurisprudence during the Seljuk era, attracting students and hosting numerous seminaries. Scholar Abd al-Jalil Qazvini Razi described Qom in the 6th century: "Qom's religious schools had sufficient resources, scholars, teachers, and interpreters, and libraries filled with books from various sects. Schools such as Sa'd Salat, Athir al-Mulk, Zayn al-Din, and Zahir al-Din were thriving."

=== Safavid Era ===
The Safavid Empire offered substantial support to Shia scholars and the Twelver Shi'i school, particularly in Qazvin and Isfahan. Throughout the Safavid era, Shia scholars frequently stayed in Qom to engage in teaching. The most established figures who taught in Qom during this period include Baha' al-Din al-'Amili (Sheikh Baha'i), Sadr al-Din Shirazi (Mulla Sadra), Mulla Mohsen Fayz Kashani, and 'Abd al-Razzaq Lahiji.

=== Qajar and Pahlavi Eras ===
During the Qajar and Pahlavi eras, numerous Shia scholars were present in the Qom seminary. Two major seminaries, Dar al-Shifa and Faydiyya, were established during the Qajar era.

'Abd al-Karim Ha'eri Yazdi, one of the leading Shia marāji' of his time, after completing his studies and teaching in Najaf and Karbala, returned to the city of Arak and re-established a seminary there. Ha'eri, simultaneously serving as marja', administrator, and teacher, came to be known as Āyatollah al-Mu’assis ("The Founder Ayatollah"). His primary role was managing the re-established seminary. His vision included reforms in educational methodology, specialization in jurisprudential branches, broader student knowledge, and teaching foreign languages.

To preserve the seminary, Ha'eri deliberately avoided political confrontation with Mohammad Reza Pahlavi. In fifteen years of leadership, Ha'eri brought the Qom Seminary to scholarly productivity. During this time, the Pahlavi government passed a law requiring clerics to take standardized exams, which Ha'eri accepted on the condition that they be held in Qom under his supervision.

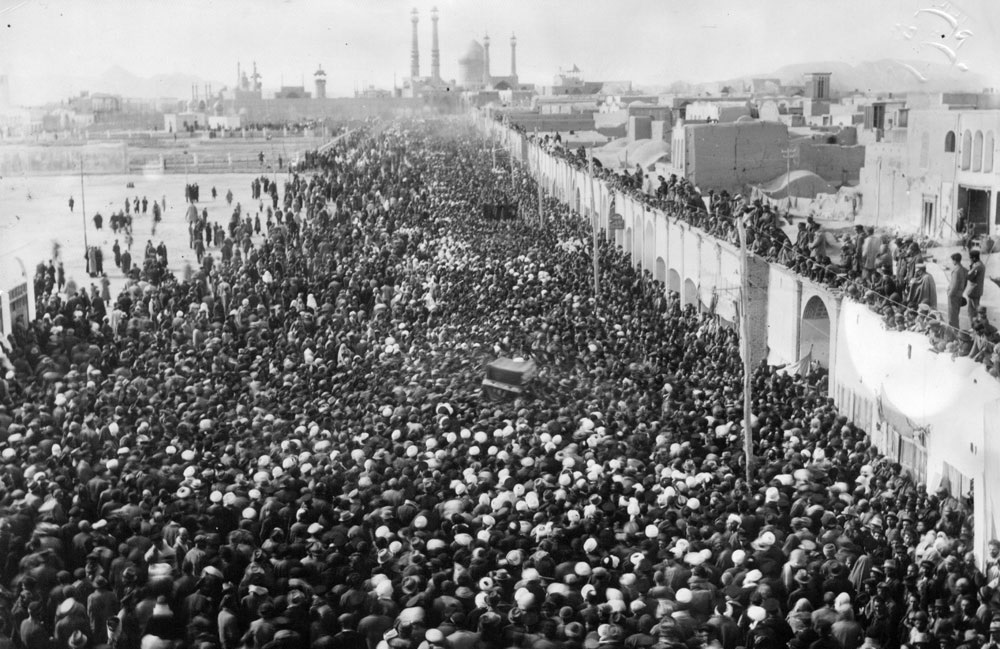
The funeral procession of ‘Abd al-Karim Ha’eri Yazdi in Qom, 1937

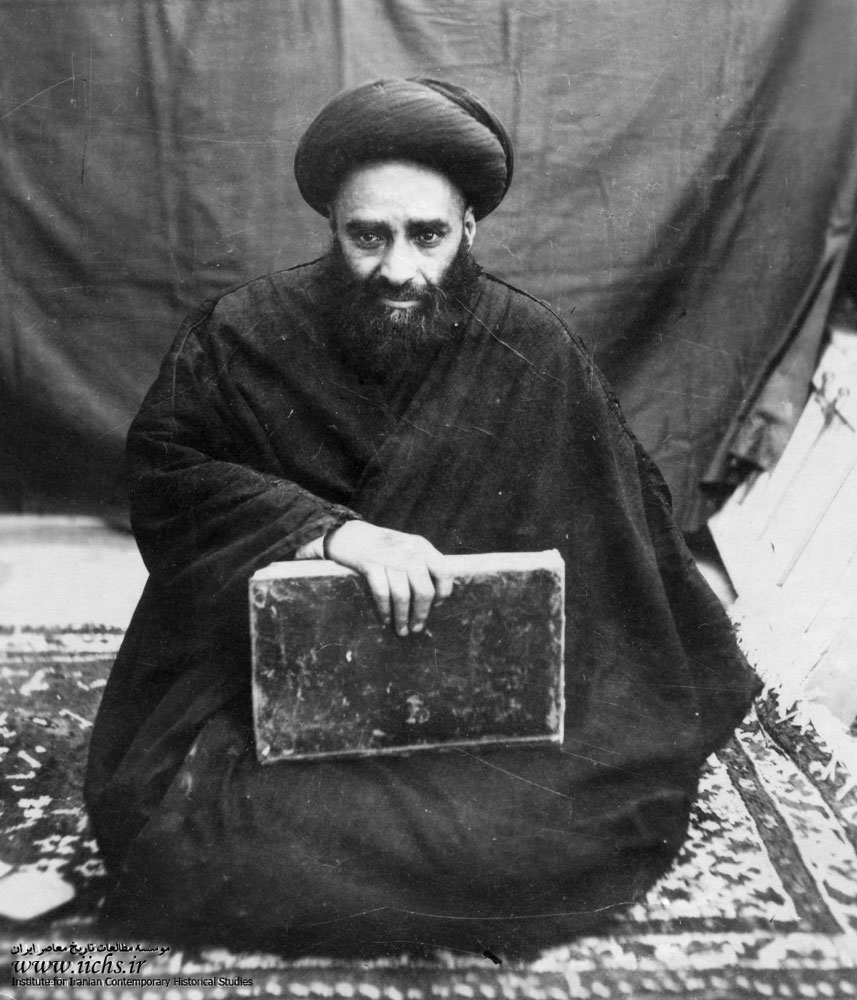
Sayyid Muhammad Hujjat Kuhkamari, the Qom Seminary leader after Ha’eri

Under Burujardi's leadership, the number of students reached 50,000 during his tenure. This was the first time the Najaf Seminary received financial aid from Qom. By the late 1940s and early 1950s, Qom attracted students from across Iran. In 1947 (1326 SH), the student population reached 2,000, growing to 5,000 by 1954 (1333 SH).

Burujardi also initiated international outreach by sending representatives to Medina, Kuwait, Pakistan, the United States, and Europe to monitor Muslim affairs. He attempted to establish centers abroad. His founding of Dar al-Taqrib in Egypt and securing recognition of the Ja'fari school as a legitimate Islamic madhhab by al-Azhar University were among his recognized achievements.

=== Iranian Revolution ===
Following the 1979 Iranian Revolution, seminaries across Iran entered a new phase of political and economic growth, including Qom. Currently, over 40,000 students, Iranian and international, are enrolled in study and scholarship there. The seminary's administrative structure, now equipped with modern technology, continues to develop and evolve.

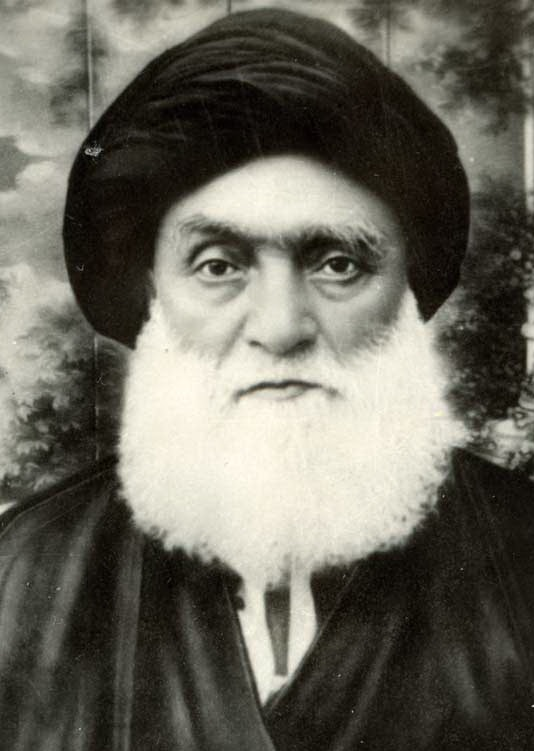
Husayn Burujardi, a Shia marja‘ who led the Qom Seminary for a time

== Institutions ==
=== Distribution Office and Stipend Bureau ===
In earlier periods, individuals who were appointed by marājiʿ (sources of emulation) to distribute stipends among seminary students were known as muqassim. These figures were typically selected from among trustworthy clerics. The muqassim was tasked with delivering the religious funds (wujūhāt) and stipends to various seminaries, and dividing them among students based on the stipend list maintained in the stipend office. The process of distribution often took several days, and therefore each seminary had a designated day for receiving stipends. During the leadership of Sheikh ʿAbdolkarim Haeri Yazdi, this role was held by Sayyid Hidāyatullāh ʿAqdāʾī and later by ʿAlī-Muḥammad Qummī and Muhammad Ṣadūqī Yazdī. In the tenure of Ayatollah Husayn Burujardi, the office was overseen by Muḥammad-Ḥusayn Aḥsan.

=== Department for Conscripts' Affairs ===
Following the implementation of mandatory military service for seminary students, a dedicated department was established in the Qom seminary to manage these matters. During Ḥāʾerī's leadership, the responsibility for this department was assigned to ʿAbd al-Husayn Burujardi. In the time of Burujardi, Mujtabā ʿIrāqī was appointed to the role. In 1987 (1366 AH), following the establishment of the Seminary Management Council (Shūrā-ye Mudīriyyat-e Ḥawzah), this council assumed responsibility for managing conscription affairs.

=== Seminary Management Council ===
The first Seminary Management Council was formed after the 1979 Iranian Revolution, in the year 1980 (1359 AH), by order of Ruhollah Khomeini in coordination with other marājiʿ. The affairs of the council were conducted through its Secretariat, which was organized into seven departments: the Academic Department, the Ethics and Spirituality Department, the Internal Management Department, the Department of Preaching and Missionaries, and the Statistics and Information Department. The appointment of the director of the Qom seminary falls under the council's purview, and today, most seminaries in Iran follow its policies and decisions.

The cities of Mashhad and Isfahan each maintain their own independent seminary councils.

=== Society of Seminary Teachers of Qom ===
The Society of Seminary Teachers of Qom is a religious, cultural, political, and social institution founded in 1962 (1341 AH) with the goal of reforming and organizing the activities of the Qom seminary. As the seminary grew in population and complexity, a group of younger seminary instructors formed what was initially known as the "Teachers' Board" (Hayʾat-e Mudarrisīn). They drafted proposals based on the seminary's needs and submitted them to Ayatollah Burujardi, who approved them but declined formal leadership. After Burūjirdī's death in 1961 (1340 AH), the institution was restructured with new members and a revised charter. The society continued its activities and became one of the centers of resistance during the 1979 Iranian Revolution. Shortly thereafter, it was officially registered in 1979 (1358 AH). According to its charter, its goals include reforming the seminary curriculum, revising textbooks, training students for missionary work abroad, establishing research centers, and improving student education.

=== Islamic Propagation Office ===
This institution was founded through the efforts of Muhammad Kāẓim Shariʿatmadārī. Its purpose was to train seminary students for religious outreach and missionary work in various regions. Established in 1965 (1344 AH), its curriculum included Islamic theology, the study of religions and sects, Qur'anic exegesis and memorization, jurisprudence and legal theory, hadith sciences, memorization of religious texts, Islamic history, knowledge of Islamic countries, Persian and Arabic literature, oratory and public speaking skills, and more.

== Curriculum ==
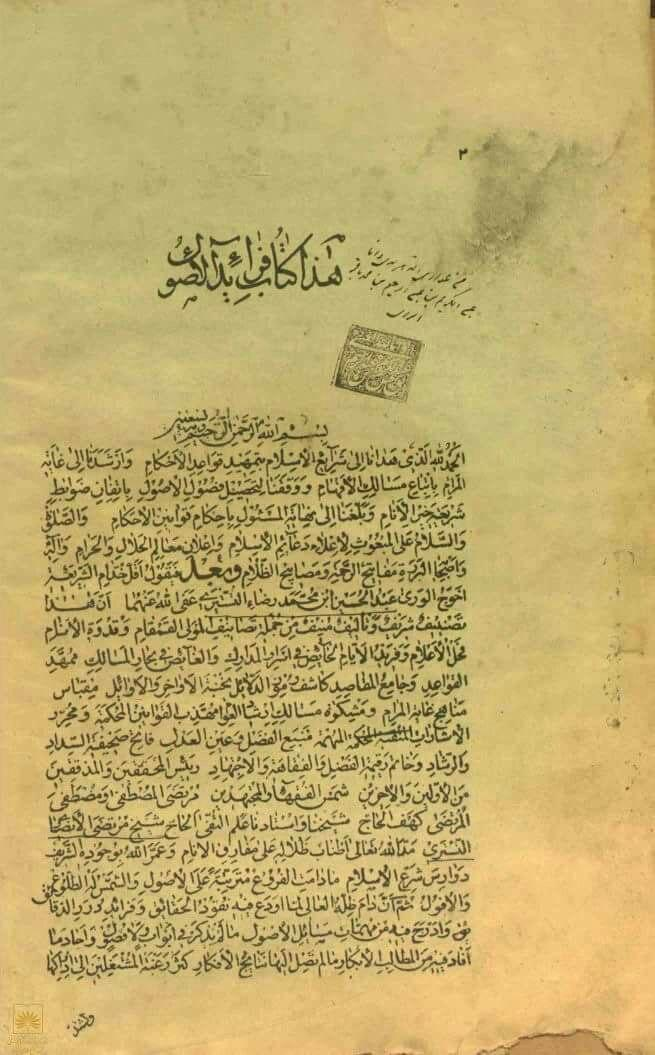
Manuscript of the book Farā'id al-Uṣūl in the National Library of Iran

=== Subjects ===
In the field of jurisprudence, Qom-based hadith scholars authored numerous works. History, geography, biographies, and the science of narrator evaluation (ʿilm al-rijāl) were also regarded as important disciplines in the seminary.

Today, the main subjects taught at the Qom Seminary include jurisprudence (fiqh), principles of jurisprudence (uṣūl al-fiqh), philosophy, theology (kalām), Qur'anic exegesis, Qur'anic sciences, Arabic literature, biographical evaluation (rijāl), hadith studies (dirāyah), and ethics. Additionally, some subjects such as mysticism (irfan), mathematics, and astronomy have also been part of the seminary curriculum.

During the 2008–2009 academic year, 587 course units were taught at the advanced levels of the Qom Seminary (i.e., levels seven through ten).

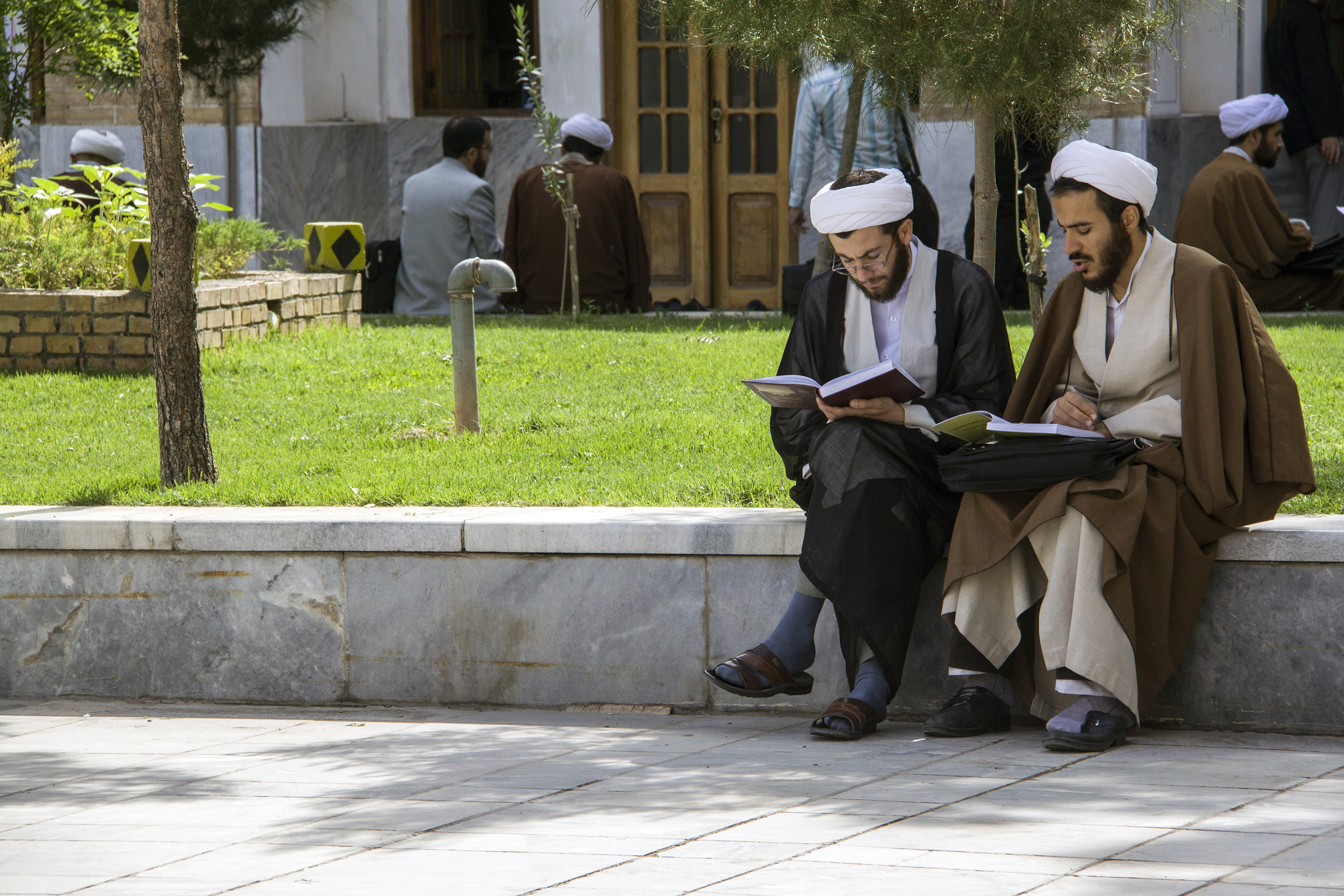
Two students in discussion at the Fayziyeh School of Qom

=== Method of Instruction ===
The method of instruction in all Shia seminaries has been largely uniform. In earlier times, students would attend lectures in person, where the instructor would recite hadiths either from memory or written texts. The students would then memorize or transcribe the hadiths. Occasionally, students would read a text or hadith aloud, and the instructor would confirm its authenticity. Once the student’s proficiency in understanding hadith was established, the teacher would grant them permission to transmit the narrations.

The history of student examinations in the Qom Seminary has seen ups and downs. Initially, exams were opposed on the grounds that the government’s motive was to identify talented students for recruitment into state institutions. However, Grand Ayatollahs Ḥāʾirī and Burūjirdī later accepted the practice. Nevertheless, some scholars in Najaf objected to student examinations and called for their abolition, leading Burūjirdī to cancel them in Qom. After his time, exams were reintroduced and have since become standard practice. Today, exams serve as a means to verify that students have completed their studies. Grand Ayatollah Mohammad-Reza Golpayegani stated that taking an exam in a subsequent level is contingent upon passing the previous one. These exams have led to a structured ranking of levels and, consequently, a tiered system of stipends.

=== Academic Levels ===
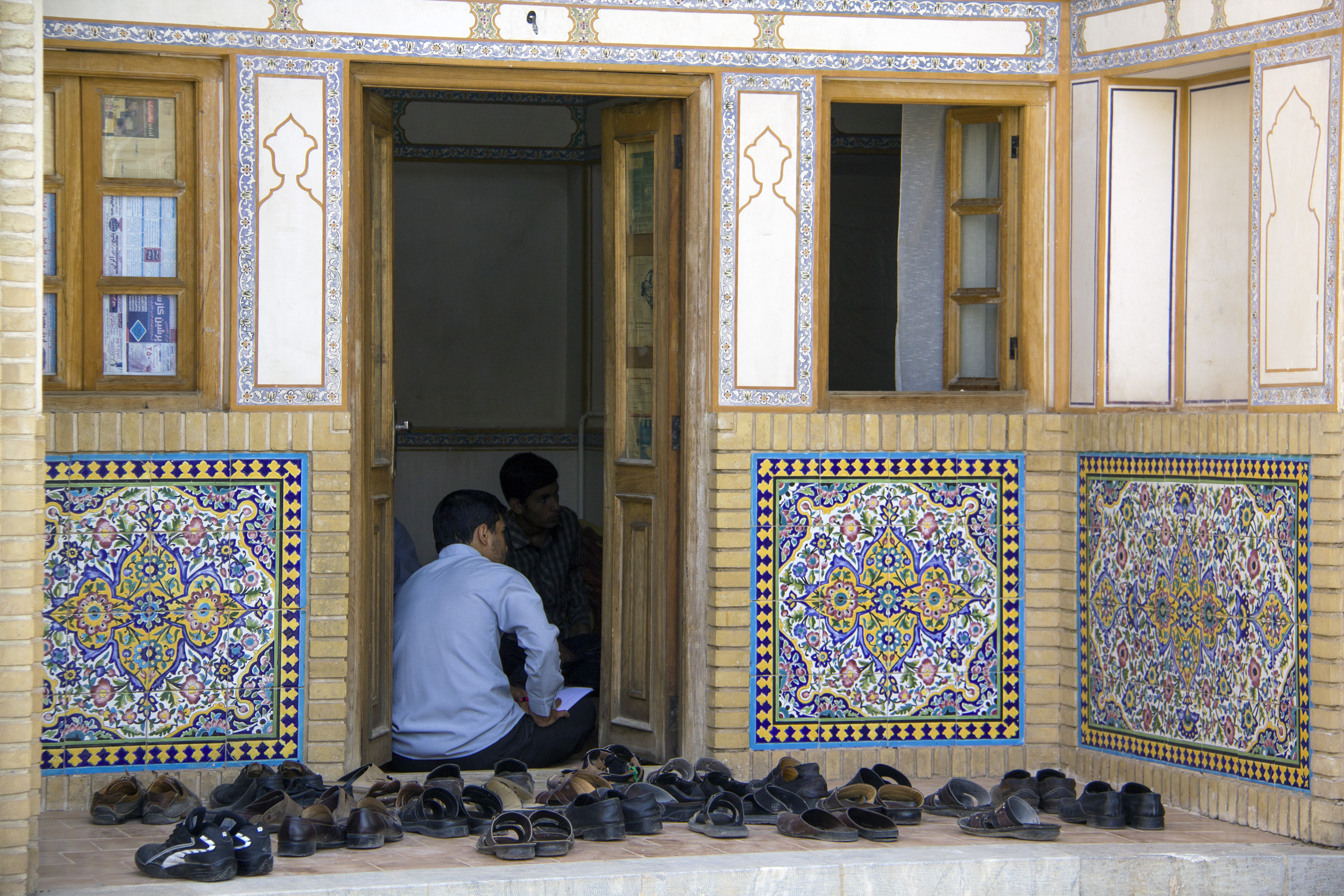
A classroom for Islamic sciences at the Khan School in the Qom Seminary

The academic structure of contemporary seminaries is divided into three main levels and a fourth, advanced level. Each level is composed of several "bases" (bāya), each generally taking one year to complete:

- First Level: Includes Arabic literature and the book Sharḥ al-Lumʿa (Bases 1–6)
- Second Level: Covers jurisprudence and principles using the texts Makāsib al-Muḥarrama and Rasā'il (Bases 7–8)
- Third Level: Involves the two books Makāsib and Kifāya (Bases 9–10)
- Fourth Level: Advanced studies (dars-e khārij) in jurisprudence

These academic levels can be officially equated with standard educational degrees as follows:

- Completion of the first level: Equivalent to a High school diploma
- Completion of the second level with a thesis: Equivalent to a Bachelor's degree
- Completion of the third level: Equivalent to a Master's degree
- Completion of the fourth level (four years of dars-e khārij in jurisprudence and principles, including four exams and a research thesis): Equivalent to a Doctorate

== Notable teachers ==
- Abdul-Karim Ha'eri Yazdi
- Abdul-Karim Mousavi Ardebili
- Ahmad Khonsari
- Ali Meshkini
- Ali Safi Golpaygani
- Ayatollah Haj Mirza Khalil Kamareyi
- Hossein Vahid Khorasani
- Hussein-Ali Montazeri
- Jawad Tabrizi
- Mehdi Shab Zende Dar Jahromi
- Mohammad Alavi Gorgani
- Mohammad Ali Araki
- Mohammad Beheshti
- Mohammad Fazel Lankarani
- Mohammad Kazem Shariatmadari
- Mohammad al-Husayni al-Shirazi
- Mohammad-Reza Golpaygani
- Mohammad-Taqi Bahjat Foumani
- Morteza Haeri Yazdi
- Mousa Shubairi Zanjani
- Muhammad Hujjat Kuh-Kamari
- Muhammad Husayn Tabataba'i
- Naser Makarem Shirazi
- Ruhollah Khomeini
- Sadr al-Din al-Sadr
- Sayyid Sadeq Rohani
- Seyyed Hossein Borujerdi
- Shahab al-Din Mar'ashi Najafi
- Yousef Saanei
- Seyed Reza Bahaadini

== Notable alumni ==
- Ahmad Ahmadi
- Hassan Farhang Ansari
- Hesamodin Ashna
- Asadollah Bayat-Zanjani
- Seyed Ali Asghar Dastgheib
- Ali Davani
- Hassan Hassanzadeh Amoli
- Sadegh Khalkhali
- Ali Khamenei
- Mojtaba Khamenei
- Esmaeil Khatib
- Najaf Lakzaee
- Mohammad Fazel Lankarani
- Mahmoud Mar'ashi Najafi
- Hossein Modarressi
- Mohammad Mofatteh
- Majid Mohammadi
- Muhammad Mohaqiq
- Morteza Motahhari
- Movsum Samadov
- Ebrahim Raisi
- Hassan Rouhani
- Musa al-Sadr
- Ahmad Vaezi

== See also ==
- Fatima Masumeh Shrine
- Society of Seminary Teachers of Qom
- Hawza Najaf
- Marjaʿ
- Lists of maraji
- Isfahan Seminary
