= Hassan Farhang Ansari =

Iranian scholar of Islam

- Born: 1970 (age 55–56)
- Education: École pratique des hautes études (PhD, Diplôme); Lebanese University; University of Tehran; Islamic Seminary of Qom (Ijtihad)
- Scientific career
- Fields: Islamic Studies
- Thesis: L’imamat et l’Occultation selon l’imamisme: Etude bibliographique et histoire des textes (2009)
- Doctoral advisor: Mohammad Ali Amir-Moezzi

Hassan Farhang Ansari (born 1970) is an Iranian Islamic scholar and Visiting Professor of Islamic Law and Theology at the Institute for Advanced Study. He is known for his works on Islamic theology, philosophy, law, and legal theory. He is a co-editor of Shii Studies Review.

== Works ==
- L’imamat et l’Occultation selon l’imamisme
- Accusations of Unbelief in Islam: A Diachronic Perspective on Takfīr
- The Zaydi Reception of Bahshamite Mu'tazilism
- Yemeni Manuscript Cultures in Peril
