= Mahmoud Mar'ashi Najafi =

Iranian librarian and manuscript scholar

Ayatollah; Seyyed; Mahmoud Mar'ashi Najafi
- محمود مرعشی نجفی
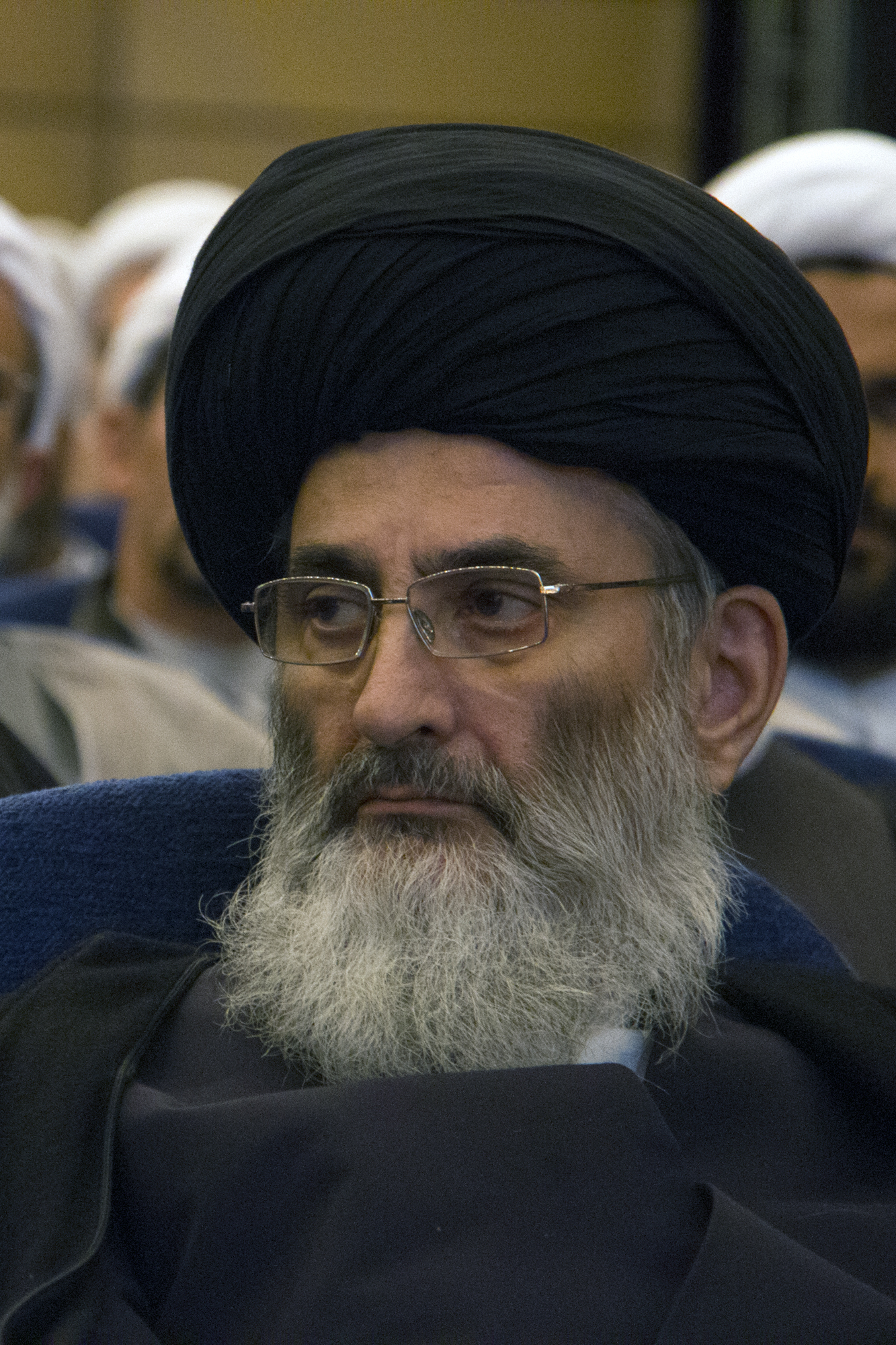
- Born: 1941 (age 84–85); Qom, Iran
- Education: PhD in sociology
- Alma mater: University of Tehran; University of London
- Occupations: Librarian; Bibliographer; Cataloging; Codicology
- Father: Shahab ud-Din Mar'ashi Najafi

Mahmoud Mar'ashi Najafi or Seyyed Mahmoud Mar'ashi Najafi (born 1941) is an Iranian librarian, Bibliographer and manuscript expert. He is the director of Mar'ashi Najafi Library, which he says is one of the largest libraries in Iran and the world.

== Life and education ==
Seyyed Mahmoud Mar'ashi Najafi, the eldest son of Shahab ud-Din Mar'ashi Najafi and the grandson of Seyyed Shamsuddin Mahmoud Mar'ashi Najafi, was born in 1941 in Qom, Iran. After elementary and high school in Qom, he started learning Islamic seminary sciences, studied the basics and first levels with prominent professors such as Fazel Lankarani, Seyyed Mahdi Lajevardi, Abutaleb Tajlil Tabrizi, Mohammad Sadegh Nasiri Sarabi, Mohammad Taghi Sotoudeh and Seyyed Ahmad Varamini. He then learned the highest level of seminary lessons from his father, who was a distinguished professor, and until the last days of his father's life, he was his disciple. In addition to studying religious sciences, Mar'ashi studied books and treatises of the ancients and the late in these fields due to his great interest in the sciences of rijal, genealogy, bibliography and codicology. In this way, he used his father's instructions and experiences a lot and gradually became an expert. He has received many permissions from many professors and elders. He then entered the academic sciences in the field of sociology. Mar'ashi continued his studies in sociology, first at the University of Tehran and then at the University of London, and in 1985 received a doctorate in sociology from the University of London.

== Bibliography ==
=== Books ===
Seyyed Mahmoud Mar'ashi Najafi 's independent works are mainly in the field of cataloging of manuscripts, bibliography and biography of a number of Iranian Muslim thinkers. From 1962 to 2003, in a period of forty-one years, he has authored twelve books. In addition, he has corrected 9 works and 64 books have been published under his supervision. Among his independent works, the following can be mentioned (all in Persian language):

- Sharhe Haal va Afkar va Asaar va Aqayed va Nazariate Ibn Sina (Persian: شرح حال و افکار و آثار و عقاید و نظریات‌ ابن سینا, English meaning: Biography, thoughts, works, ideas and theories of Avicenna), 1962
- Sharhe Haal va Asaar va Araae va Aqayed va Nazariate Abu Hamed Ghazali (Persian: شرح حال و آثار و آراء و عقاید و نظریات‌ ابو حامد غزالی, English meaning: Biography, works, opinions, ideas and theories of Al-Ghazali), 1962
- Sharhe Haal va Asaar va Araae Abu Nasr Farabi (Persian: شرح حال و آثار و آراء ابو نصر فارابی, English meaning: Biography, works and opinions of Al-Farabi)
- Al-Mosalsalaat fi al-Ejaazaat (Arabic: المسلسلات فى الاجازات, English meaning: The series of permissions), Arabic, 1995
- Ganjineh: Fehreste Bakhshi az Noskhehaye Khattie Farsie Samarkand va Bukhara va Khwarazm (Persian: (گنجینه (فهرست بخشی از نسخه‌های خطی‌ فارسی سمرقند و بخارا و خوارزم, English meaning: Thesaurus (List of part of Persian manuscripts of Samarkand, Bukhara and Khwarazm)), 1998
- Fehreste Noskhehaye Khatti Ketabkhaneye Bozorge Ayatollah al-Ozma Mar'ashi Najafi (Persian: فهرست نسخه‌های خطی کتابخانه بزرگ‌ آیت الله العظمی مرعشی نجفی, English meaning: List of manuscripts of the Grand Library of Grand Ayatollah Marashi Najafi), 2000-2001
- Fehreste Noskhehaye Khatti Asaare Allame Seyyed Roknuddin Haidar Hosseini Amoli dar Ketabkhaneye Hazrate Ayatollah al-Ozma Mar'ashi Najafi (Persian: فهرست نسخه‌های خطی آثار علامه سید رکن‌الدین حیدر حسینی آملی در کتابخانه حضرت‌ آیت الله العظمی مرعشی نجفی, English meaning: List of manuscripts of the works of Allama Seyyed Roknuddin Haidar Hosseini Amoli in the library of Grand Ayatollah Mar'ashi Najafi), 2002
- Fehreste Noskhehaye Khatti Asaare Allame Qazi Noorollah Mar'ashi Shustari dar Ketabkhaneye Hazrate Ayatollah al-Ozma Mar'ashi Najafi (Persian: فهرست نسخه‌های خطی آثار علامه قاضی‌ نور الله مرعشی شوشتری در کتابخانه حضرت‌ آیت الله العظمی مرعشی نجفی, English meaning: List of manuscripts of the works of Qazi Nurullah Shustari in the library of Grand Ayatollah Mar'ashi Najafi), 2002
- Fehreste Noskhehaye Khatti Asaare Allame Nezamuddin Abdul Ali Birjandi (Persian: فهرست نسخه‌های خطی آثار علامه‌ نظام‌الدین عبدالعلی بیرجندی, English meaning: List of manuscripts of the works of Al-Birjandi), 2002
- Noskhehaye Khatti Kohan va Nafise Nahj al-Balagha va Shoroohe Bargozideh va Tarjomehaye Aan dar Ketabkhaneye Ayatollah al-Ozma Mar'ashi Najafi (Persian: نسخه‌های خطی کهن و نفیس نهج البلاغه‌ و شروح برگزیده و ترجمه‌های آن در کتابخانه‌ آیت الله العظمی مرعشی نجفی, English meaning: Ancient and exquisite manuscripts of Nahj al-Balagha and selected commentaries and translations of it in the library of Grand Ayatollah Marashi Najafi), 2002
- Navader al-Makhtootaat al-Arabiah men Qarn al-Saaless ela al-Saadess al-Hijri (Arabic: نوادر المخطوطات العربية من قرن الثالث الی السادس الهجری, English meaning: Rare Arabic manuscripts from the third century to the seventh century AH), Arabic, 2002
- Ketab Shenasi Tosifie Hazrate Ayatollah al-Ozma Mar'ashi Najafi (Persian: کتاب شناسی توصیفی حضرت آیت الله‌ العظمی مرعشی نجفی, English meaning: Descriptive bibliography of Grand Ayatollah Mar'ashi Najafi), 2003
- Safarnameye Chin (Persian: سفرنامه چين, English meaning: Travelogue of China)
- Oday ibn al-Raqqa, Shaere Qarne Avval (Persian: عدى بن الرقاع، شاعر قرن اول, English meaning: Oday ibn al-Raqqa, poet of the first century AH)
- Fehreste Bakhshi az Noskhehaye Khatti Mansoub beh Alemane Samarkand (Persian: فهرست بخشى از نسخه‌هاى خطى منسوب به عالمان سمرقند, English meaning: List of part of the manuscripts attributed to the scholars of Samarkand)
- Moroori bar Zendegie Seyyed Abdul Hadi Delijani (Persian: مرورى بر زندگى سيد عبدالهادى دليجانى, English meaning: An overview of the life of Seyyed Abdul Hadi Delijani)
- Nokhostin Ketabhaye Chappi Arabi va Farsi keh dar Jahan Montasher Shodeh (Persian: نخستين كتاب‌هاى چاپى عربى و فارسى كه در جهان منتشر شده, English meaning: The first Arabic and Persian printed books published in the world)
- Noskhehaye Khatti Kohan Nahj al-Balagha (Persian: نسخه‌هاى خطى كهن نهج‌البلاغة, English meaning: Ancient manuscripts of Nahj al-Balagha)
- Jahane Ketabkhaneha: Gozideh Maqaalaat Darbareye Ketabkhanehaye Iran va Jahan (Persian: جهان کتابخانه‌ها: گزیده مقالات درباره کتابخانه‌های ایران و جهان, English meaning: World of the Libraries: A selection of articles about Iranian and world libraries), 2012
- Mirase Mandegar (Persian: میراث ماندگار, English meaning: Lasting heritage), 2003
- Marja e Miras Baan (Persian: مرجع میراث بان, English meaning: Inheritance keeper Marja'), 2011
- Fehreste Dast Neveshtehaye Asaare Khajeh Nasiruddin Mohammad ibn Mohammad Tusi dar Ketabkhaneye Bozorge Hazrate Ayatollah al-Ozma Mar'ashi Najafi (Persian: فهرست دست نوشته‌های آثار خواجه نصیرالدین محمد بن محمد طوسی (ره) در کتابخانه بزرگ حضرت آیت الله العظمی مرعشی نجفی (ره), English meaning: List of Manuscripts of the Works of Nasir al-Din al-Tusi in the Great Library of Grand Ayatollah Mar'ashi Najafi), 2005
- Ketab Shenasie Asaare Dat Nevise Allame Kamaluddin Meysam ibn Ali Bahrani (Persian: کتابشناسی آثار دستنویس علامه کمال الدین میثم بن علی بحرانی, English meaning: Bibliography of the manuscripts of Allamah Maitham Al Bahrani), 2006
- Shenakht Nameye Seyed Abdolhadi Hosseini Delijani (Persian: شناخت نامه سید عبدالهادی حسینی دلیجانی, English meaning: Cognition treatise about Seyed Abdolhadi Hosseini Delijani), 2007
- Ejaazaat va Namehaye Ayatollah al-Ozma Seyyed Abu Al-Hassan Isfahani to Ayatollah al-Ozma Seyyed Shahabuddin Mar'ashi Najafi (Persian: اجازات و نامه‌های آیت الله العظمی سید ابوالحسن اصفهانی (ره) به آیت الله العظمی سید شهاب‌الدین مرعشی نجفی (ره), English meaning: Permits and letters of Grand Ayatollah Seyyed Abu Al-Hassan Isfahani to Grand Ayatollah Seyyed Shahabuddin Mar'ashi Najafi), Arabic, 2008
- Marja' e Farhang Baan (Persian: مرجع فرهنگبان, English meaning: Culture keeper Marja'), 2009
- Mowsoo'ah al-Imamah fi Nosoos Ahle al-Sonnah (Arabic: موسوعة الامامة فی نصوص أهل السنة, English meaning: The encyclopedia of the Imam in the texts of the Sunnis), 2009
- Makatib al-Mahfooz (Arabic: مکاتیب المحفوظ, English meaning: Reserved letters), 2009
- Noskheh Shenasi (Persian: نسخه‌شناسی: پژوهشهایی درباره نسخه‌های خطی در ایران و جهان, English meaning: Codicology: Studies on manuscripts of Iran and of the world), 2007
- Namehaye Namvaran (Persian: نامه‌های ناموران, English meaning: Letters of the prominents), 2010
- Shasto Seh Noskheh Khatti Nafis az Sadehaye Cheharom va Panjom va Sheshom Hejri (Persian: شصت و سه نسخه خطی نفیس از سده‌های چهارم و پنجم و ششم هجری, English meaning: Sixty-three exquisite manuscripts from the fourth, fifth and sixth centuries AH), 1994
- Yeksado Seh Noskheye Khatti az Sadeye Haftom Hejri (Persian: یکصد و سه نسخه خطی از سده هفتم هجری, English meaning: One hundred and three manuscripts from the seventh century AH), 1994
- Devisto Hashtad Noskheye Khatti Nafis az Qarne Hashtom (Persian: دویست و هشتاد نسخه خطی نفیس از قرن هشتم, English meaning: Two hundred and eighty exquisite manuscripts from the eighth century AH), 1994
- Ketab Khaneye Omoomi Hazrate Ayatollah al-Ozma Mar'ashi Najafi dar Yek Negah (Persian: کتابخانه عمومی حضرت آیة الله العظمی مرعشی نجفی در یک نگاه, English meaning: Grand Ayatollah Mar'ashi Najafi Public Library at a glance), 1992
- Ganjineh Shahab: Majmooeh Resaleha va Maqalehaye Elmi dar Pasdaasht Hazrate Ayatollah al-Ozma Mar'ashi Najafi (Persian: گنجینه شهاب: مجموعه رساله‌ها و مقاله‌های علمی در پاسداشت حضرت آیت‌الله العظمی مرعشی نجفی (ره), English meaning: Treasures of Shahab: A Collection of Scientific Treatises and Articles in Honor of Grand Ayatollah Mar'ashi Najafi), 2001
- Ranj va Ganj (Persian: رنج و گنج, English meaning: Suffering and treasure), 2007
- Fehrestvareye Noskhehaye Khatti Asaare Elmie Fayz Kashani dar Ganjineh Jahani Makhtootaat Eslami Ketabkhaneye Bozorge Hazrate Ayatollah al-Ozma Mar'ashi Najafi (Persian: فهرستواره نسخه‌های خطی آثار علمی فیض کاشانی در گنجینه جهانی مخطوطات اسلامی کتابخانه بزرگ حضرت آیت‌الله العظمی مرعشی نجفی (ره), English meaning: Catalog of Manuscripts of Fayz Kashani's Scientific Works in the World Treasure of Islamic Manuscripts of the Mar'ashi Najafi Library), 2008
- Noskhehaye Noyafteh (Persian: نسخه‌های نویافته: گزارشی از گزیده نسخه‌های خطی خریداری شده کتابخانه بزرگ حضرت آیت‌الله العظمی مرعشی نجفی (ره) (گنجینه جهانی مخطوطات اسلامی), English meaning: Newly found manuscripts: A report on a selection of manuscripts purchased by the Mar'ashi Najafi Library (World Treasure of Islamic Manuscripts)), 2008
- Faqihe Farzaneh: Zendegi Nameye Ayatollah Seyyed Morteza Faqih Mobarqa (Persian: فقیه فرزانه: زندگی‌نامه آیت‌الله سیدمرتضی فقیه مبرقع, English meaning: The Wise Faqih: Biography of Ayatollah Seyyed Morteza Faqih Mobarqa), 2009
- Tariq Sheikh Ansari ela al-Ma'soom (Arabic: طریق شیخ انصاری الی المعصوم, English meaning: The path of Murtadha al-Ansari to the Infallible), Arabic, 1995
- Ganjineh: Fehreste Bakhshi az Noskhehaye Khattie Farsi va Arabie Samarkand va Bukhara va Khwarazm (Persian: گنجینه: فهرست بخشی از نسخه‌های خطی فارسی و عربی منسوب به دانشمندان سمرقند، بخارا و خوارزم, English meaning: Thesaurus: List of part of Persian and Arabic manuscripts of Samarkand, Bukhara and Khwarazm), 1998
- Fehreste Namgooye Nosakhe Khattie Makhzane Hamid Soleiman Anstitoo Shaq Shenasi Abu Reyhan Birooni (Ozbakestan) (Persian: فهرست نامگوی نسخ خطی مخزن حمید سلیمان انستیتو شرق‌شناسی ابوریحان بیرونی (ازبکستان), English meaning: List of manuscripts of Hamid Soleiman Repository of Abu Rihan Biruni, Institute of Oriental Studies (Uzbekistan)), 1998

=== Articles ===
Dr. Mar'ashi has published the results of his studies in the fields of librarianship, archiving and manuscript research, his experiences and his visits of the cultural centers of different countries in more than 60 articles, conversations and reports in the following publications:

- Mirase Shahab (Persian: میراث شهاب, English meaning: The Shahab's Heritage), journal, since 1995
- Miras (Persian: میراث, English meaning: The Heritage), journal
- Mirase Eslami (Persian: میراث اسلامی, English meaning: The Islamic Heritage), journal

Some of these articles have also been published in his book Ganjineh Shahab. Among other Mar'ashi 's articles, the following can be mentioned (all in Persian language):

- Noskhehaye Khattie Noyafteh (Persian: نسخه‌های خطی نو یافته, English meaning: Newly found manuscripts), 2011
- Danesh Nameye Kootahe Farsi (Persian: دانشنامه‌ی کوتاه فارسی, English meaning: Concise Persian encyclopedia), 2010
- Olamaye Shiiee va Masaleye Ejazeh dar Qarne Noozdahom (Persian: علمای شیعی و مساله‌ی اجازه در قرن نوزدهم, English meaning: Shiite scholars and the issue of the permission in the nineteenth century AH), translator, 2010
- Kabikaj dar Noskhehaye Khatti (Persian: کبیکج در نسخه‌های خطی, English meaning: Ranunculus lanuginosus in the manuscripts), 2010
- Ketabcheye Porseh va Pasokh ya Estentaq az Mirza Reza Kermani (Persian: کتابچه‌ی پرسش و پاسخ یا استنطاق از میرزا رضا کرمانی, English meaning: Question and Answer Booklet or Interrogation of Mirza Reza Kermani), 2009
- Joqrafiaye Khuzestan (Persian: جغرافیای خوزستان, English meaning: Geography of Khuzestan), 2009
- Ketab Shenasie Kamaluddin Meysam Bahrani (Persian: کتابشناسی کمال الدین میثم بحرانی, English meaning: Bibliography of Maitham Al Bahrani), 2006
- Resaleye Montakhab (Persian: رساله‌ی منتخب, English meaning: The selected treatise), 2006
- Eslam, Iran, Chin (Persian: اسلام، ایران، چین, English meaning: Islam, Iran, China), 2004
- Safarnameye Eshqabad, Samaqand va Bokhara (Persian: سفرنامه‌ی عشق آباد، سمرقند و بخارا, English meaning: Travelogue of Ashgabat, Samarkand and Bukhara), 2004
- Gozareshe Safare Faranse (Persian: گزارش سفر فرانسه, English meaning: Travel report to France), 2004
- Maraseme Eftetahe Ketabkhaneh Eskandarieh (Persian: مراسم افتتاح کتابخانه اسکندریه, English meaning: Opening Ceremony of the Bibliotheca Alexandrina Library), 2002
- Do Nemooneh az Qoranhaye Koofie Kohan; Az Ganjineye Noskhehaye Khattie Ketabkhaneye Bozorge Ayatollah al-Ozma Mar'ashi Najafi (Persian: دو نمونه از قرآن‌های کوفی کهن؛ از گنجینه‌ی نسخه‌های خطی کتابخانه‌ی بزرگ آیت الله العظمی مرعشی نجفی (ره), English meaning: Two versions of ancient Kufi Qurans; From the treasure trove of manuscripts of the Mar'ashi Najafi Library), 2001
- Noskhehaye Kharidari Shodeh (Persian: نسخه‌های خریداری شده, English meaning: Purchased manuscripts), 2001
- Noskhehaye Khattie Ketabkhaneye Aref Hekmat (Persian: نسخه‌های خطی کتابخانه‌ی عارف حکمت, English meaning: Manuscripts of Aref Hekmat Library), 2000
- Moallefe Rabi al-Shi'ah (Persian: مولف ربیع الشیعة, English meaning: The author of the Rabi 'al-Shi'ah), 2000
- Noskhehaye Jadide Ketabkhaneh (Gozide ee az Noskhehaye Khattie Kohan va Nafise Tazeh Kharidari Shodeh) (Persian: نسخه‌های جدید کتابخانه (گزیده‌ای از نسخه‌های خطی کهن و نفیس تازه خریداری شده), English meaning: New manuscripts of the library (Excerpts from Old and Exquisite Manuscripts Newly Purchased)), 2000
- Konferanse Beinol Melalie Noskhehaye Khatti (Persian: کنفرانس بین المللی نسخه‌های خطی, English meaning: The International Conference of the Manuscripts), 2000
- Do Ketabkhaneye Nafise Shakhsi (Persian: دو کتابخانه‌ی نفیس شخصی, English meaning: Two exquisite personal libraries), 2000
- Ketab va Ketabkhaneh; Atlalat ala Maktabata Ayatollah al-Ozma Mar'ashi (Persian: کتاب و کتابخانه؛ اطلالة علی مکتبة آیة الله العظمی مرعشی, English meaning: Books and libraries; Informations about the Mar'ashi Najafi Library), 1999
- Rahtoosheye Ozbakestan (Persian: رهتوشه‌ی ازبکستان, English meaning: Route luggage of Uzbekistan), 1998
- Ketabkhaneye Shakhsie Ayatollah Bahari Hamedani (Persian: کتابخانه‌ی شخصی آیت‌الله بهاری همدانی (ره), English meaning: Personal Library of Ayatollah Bahari Hamedani), 1998
- Jahan Ketabkhaneh; Ketabkhaneye Shakhsie Ayatollah Bahari Hamedani (Persian: جهان کتابخانه؛ کتابخانه‌ی شخصی آیت‌الله بهاری همدانی, English meaning: World Library; Ayatollah Bahari Hamedani Personal Library), 1998
- Mirase Khattie Ketabkhaneh; Noskhehaye Khattie Zakhireye Khwarazm Shahi (Persian: میراث خطی کتابخانه؛ نسخه‌های خطی ذخیره‌ی خوارزمشاهی, English meaning: Library manuscript heritage; Khwarazmian dynasty Saved Manuscripts), 1998
- Ravian va Shoyookhe Shiee Bokhari (Persian: راویان و شیوخ شیعی بخاری, English meaning: Bukhari Shiite narrators and sheikhs), 1998
- Gozareshe Safar beh Ozbakestan (Persian: گزارش سفر به ازبکستان, English meaning: Travel report to Uzbekistan), 1997
- Noskhehaye Nehayah Sheikh Tusi (Persian: نسخه‌های نهایه‌ی شیخ طوسی, English meaning: The manuscripts of the book Al-Nihayah by Shaykh Tusi), 1997
- Tafsire Balabel al-Qalaqel (Persian: تفسیر بلابل القلاقل, English meaning: Interpretation of the Balabel al-Qalaqel), 1994
- Gozideye Ketab Shansie Tosifie Foraqe Eslami (Persian: گزیده کتاب شناسی توصیفی فرق اسلامی, English meaning: Excerpts from the descriptive bibliography of Islamic sects), 1990
- Sharhi Noyafteh bar Tahdhib al-Ahkam Sheikh al-Taefeh Mohammad ibn Hassan Tusi (Persian: شرحی نویافته بر تهذیب الاحکام شیخ الطائفه محمد بن حسن طوسی, English meaning: A newly found commentary on the Tahdhib al-Ahkam of Shaykh Tusi), 2019
- Dast Neveshtehayi Andar Baabe Ketab Namehaye Valede Bozorgvaram Marhoom Ayatollah al-Ozma Mar'ashi Najafi va Farzande Arshade Ayatollah Sheikh Agha Bozorg Tehrani (Persian: دستنوشته‌هایی اندر باب کتاب نامه‌های والد بزرگوارم مرحوم آیت الله العظمی مرعشی نجفی و فرزند ارشد آیت الله شیخ آقا بزرگ تهرانی, English meaning: Manuscripts on the book-letters of my great father, the late Grand Ayatollah Shahab ud-Din Mar'ashi Najafi, and the eldest son of Ayatollah Sheikh Agha Bozorg Tehrani), 2019
- Moqoofate Mandegar (4): Do Noskheye Nafis az Moqoofate Ayatollah al-Ozma Mar'ashi Najafi beh Ketabkhaneye Astane Moqaddase Hazrate Fatemeh Masoumeh (Persian: موقوفات ماندگار (۴): دو نسخۀ نفیس از موقوفات آیت الله العظمی مرعشی نجفی به کتابخانۀ آستان مقدس حضرت فاطمه معصومه, English meaning: Lasting endowments (4): Two exquisite manuscripts of the endowments of Grand Ayatollah Mar'ashi Najafi to the library of the Fatima Masumeh Shrine), 2019
- Ketabkhaneh Melli Chin (Persian: کتابخانه ملی چین, English meaning: National Library of China), 2010
- Iranian az Didgahe Ahle Beit -Alayhem al-Salam- (Persian: ایرانیان از دیدگاه اهل بیت -علیهم السلام-, English meaning: Iranians from the point of view of Ahl al-Bayt), corrector, 2009
- Kaqaz Sazi: Tarikh va San'at Pishe ee Kohan (Persian: کاغذسازی: تاریخ و صنعت پیشه‌ای کهن, English meaning: Paper making: the history and industry of an ancient profession), introducer, 2009
- Dar Siasat Emam ra Moqaddam Midanestand (Persian: در سیاست امام را مقدم می‌دانستند, English meaning: In politics, the Imam was considered a priority), interviewee, 2009
- Tarikhe Jazireh Qeshm (Persian: تاریخ جزیره قشم, English meaning: History of Qeshm Island), 2008
- Qanoon Tazkareh dar Doreye Qajar (Persian: قانون تذکره در دوره قاجار, English meaning: Citizenship law in the Qajar period), 2008
- Shahab Fazl va Fazilat (Persian: شهاب فضل و فضیلت, English meaning: Shahab of grace and virtue), 2008
- Elme Nasab Shenasi (Ba Yadi az Saraamade Tabaar Shenasane Moaser Ayatollah al-Ozma Mar'ashi Najafi) (Persian: علم نسب شناسی (با یادی از سرآمد تبارشناسان معاصر آیت الله العظمی مرعشی نجفی), English meaning: Genealogy (in memory of the great contemporary genealogist Grand Ayatollah Mar'ashi Najafi)), 2006
- Rooznegare Esteqbal az Hojjaj; Talife Seyed Mohammad Hossein Razavi Hamedani (Persian: روزنگار استقبال از حجاج؛ تالیف سید محمد حسین رضوی همدانی, English meaning: Journal of welcoming pilgrims; Compiled by Seyed Mohammad Hossein Razavi Hamedani), introducer, 2006
- Tajrobat al-Mosaferin; Talife Mirza Isa Khan Munshi (Persian: تجربة المسافرین؛ تالیف میرزا عیسی خان منشی, English meaning: Experience of travelers; Written by Mirza Isa Khan Munshi), introducer, 2006
- Gozareshe Safare Arabestan (Persian: گزارش سفر عربستان, English meaning: Saudi Arabia trip report), 2006
- Joqrafiaye Astan Quds Razavi; Mirza Ali Khan Sarhang (Nobar) (Persian: جغرافیای آستان قدس رضوی؛ میرزا علی خان سرهنگ (نوبر), English meaning: Geography of Astan Quds Razavi; Mirza Ali Khan Sarhang (Nobar)), introducer, 2006
- Noskhehaye Jadid; Gozideh ee az Noskhehaye Nafis va Kohane Kharidari Shodeh ya Ehdayi (Persian: نسخه‌های جدید؛ گزیده‌ای از نسخه‌های نفیس و کهن خریداری شده یا اهدایی, English meaning: New manuscripts; A selection of exquisite and ancient manuscripts purchased or donated), 2005
- Safarnameye Hend (Persian: سفرنامه هند, English meaning: Travelogue of India), 2005
- Pedaram (Persian: پدرم, English meaning: My father), 2004
- Safarnameye Abu Dhabi (Persian: سفرنامه ابوظبی, English meaning: Abu Dhabi Travelogue), 2004
- Ganjinehaye Khatti (Persian: گنجینه‌های خطی, English meaning: Treasures of manuscript), interviewee, 2004
- Safarnameye Kuwait (Persian: سفرنامه کویت, English meaning: Travelogue of Kuwait), 2004
- Gozideh ee az Ketabhaye latiny Kharidari Shodeh (Persian: گزیده‌ای از کتابهای لاتینی خریداری شده, English meaning: Excerpts from purchased Latinate books), 2004
- Gozareshe Safar beh Keshvare Maghreb (Persian: گزارش سفر به کشور مغرب, English meaning: Travel report to Morocco), 2003
- Birjandi Nameh; Fehreste Noskhehaye Khattie Asaare Allameh Abdul Ali Birjandi dar Ketabkhanehaye Bozorge Hazrate Ayatollah al-Ozma Mar'ashi Najafi (Persian: بیرجندی نامه؛ فهرست نسخه‌های خطی آثار علامه عبدالعلی بیرجندی در کتابخانه‌ی بزرگ حضرت آیت الله العظمی مرعشی نجفی, English meaning: Birjandi treatise; List of manuscripts of the works of Allamah Abdul Ali Birjandi in the Mar'ashi Najafi Library), 2003
- Ganjineh Ketabkhaneh; 450 Noskheye Nafis az Qarne Cheharom ta Hashtom (Persian: گنجینه کتابخانه؛ ۴۵۰ نسخه نفیس از قرن چهارم تا هشتم, English meaning: Library treasure; 450 exquisite manuscripts from the fourth to the eighth century AH), 2000
- Fehreste Asaare Khattie Khajeh Nasir al-Din Tusi dar Ketabkhaneh (Persian: فهرست آثار خطی خواجه نصیرالدین طوسی در کتابخانه, English meaning: List of manuscript works by Khajeh Nasir al-Din Tusi in the library), 1997
- Nezame Ketabdarie Eslami dar Sadehaye Sevvom ta Hashtom Hejri Qamari (Persian: نظام کتابداری اسلامی در سده‌های سوم تا هشتم هجری قمری, English meaning: Islamic library system in the third to eighth centuries AH), 1995
- Gozareshe Safar beh Showravi (Persian: گزارش سفر به شوروی, English meaning: Travel report of the Soviet Union), 1991
- Ashenayi ba Ketabkhaneye Ayatollah al-Ozma Mar'ashi Najafi (Persian: آشنایی با کتابخانه آیة الله العظمی مرعشی نجفی, English meaning: Get acquainted with the library of Grand Ayatollah Mar'ashi Najafi), 1990

== Careers ==
- Director of Mar'ashi Najafi Library: Seyyed Mahmoud Mar'ashi Najafi, along with his father, played a major role in the establishment and development of the large Marashi Najafi Library in Qom. This library was established by Shahab ud-Din Mar'ashi Najafi and according to his will, its management is the responsibility of his descendants.
- Member of the World Library Organization
- Honorary member of Azerbaijan National Academy of Sciences
- Licensee and managing director of "Mirase Shahab" magazine, specialized quarterly of codicology and bibliography

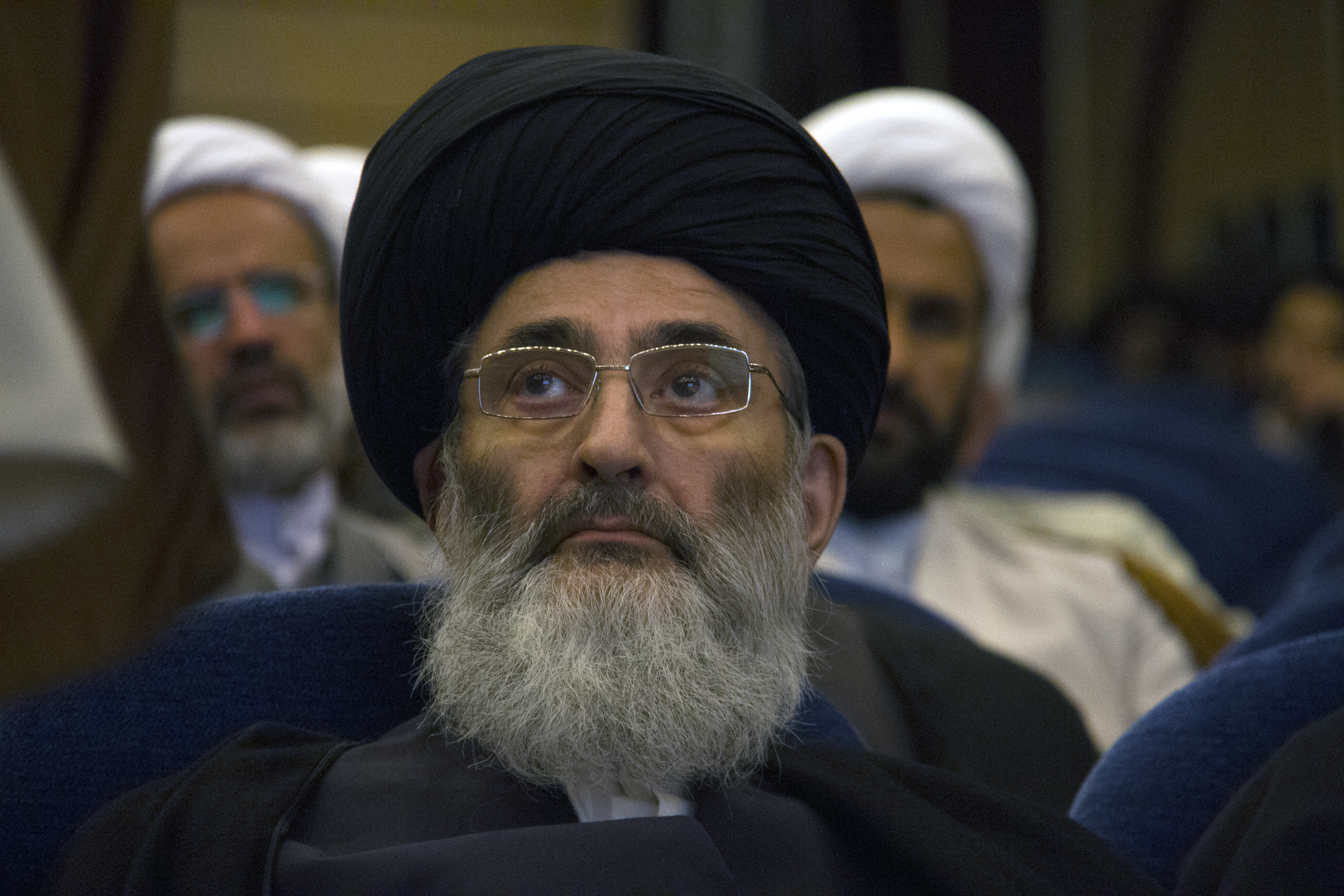
Seyyed Mahmoud Mar'ashi Najafi, February 2016.

== Awards ==
- An honorary doctorate from the Azerbaijan National Academy of Sciences, 1990
- The prominent bibliographer of the country (Iran), 1995

== See also ==
- Rasul Jafarian
- Seyyed Hassan Eslami Ardakani
- Mehdi Bayani
- Mohammad Taqi Danesh Pajouh
- Abdolmohammad Ayati
- Ahmad Vaezi
- Seyed Ali Asghar Dastgheib
