= Ahmad Vaezi =

Iranian cleric

- احمد واعظی
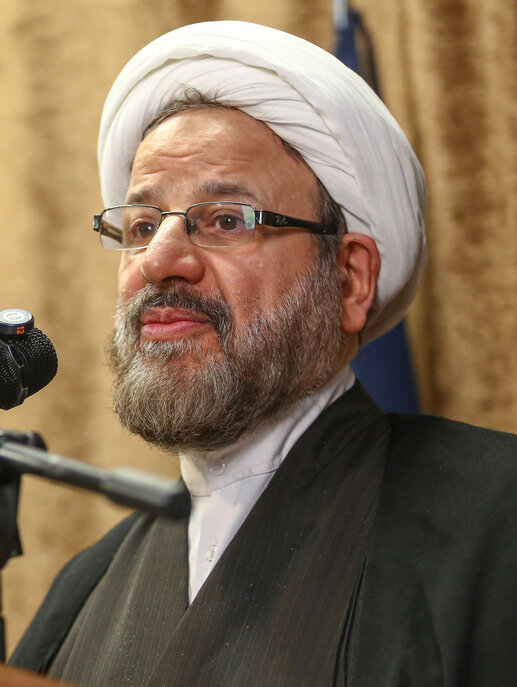
- Vaezi in 2025
- Born: 1962 (age 63–64); Rey, Iran

Academic work
- Era: 21st century Philosophy
- Region: Western Philosophy; Islamic Philosophy political philosophy hermeneutics
- School or tradition: Islam, Religious intellectualism
- Main interests: Philosophy of Religion; Social and political philosophy
- Website: https://ahmadvaezi.com/

Ahmad Vaezi (Persian: احمد واعظی; born 1962) is an Iranian philosopher, scholar and clergyman. As of 2011 he has been the chief of Islamic propagation office of Qom Seminary and since 2021 a member of the Supreme Council of Cultural Revolution. He's also a member of the supreme council of the Center for the Islamic Iranian Model of Progress in Qom, associate member of Academy of Sciences of Iran, board of trustees member of Islamic Development Organization, Supreme Leader of Iran's appointee to the Islamic Association of Iranian Students in Europe.

== Early life and education ==
Ahmad Vaezi was born in Rey, Iran, in 1963. He entered Qom seminary in 1982 and studied preliminary courses in religious sciences in 1986. He then took courses in Islamic jurisprudence, including the classes of scholars such as Ayatollah Hossein Vahid Khorasani, Shiekh Jawad Tabrizi, Seyed Kazem Haeri, and Sadeq Larijani. Mastering Philosophy under Ayatollah Abdollah Javadi-Amoli, Mohammad-Taqi Mesbah-Yazdi and H. Fayazi, he then started his professional studies in Western Philosophy and Modern Transmitted Sciences.

== Career ==
=== Academics ===
He has been a university lecturer since 1987 and has taught in many Iranian and International universities. In 2001, he moved to the United Kingdom to teach at Cambridge University, and at The Islamic College and London Seminary. His major research interests are Modern Transmitted Sciences and Western Philosophy and, since 2006, he has focused on hermeneutics and political thought.

=== Politics ===
According to Radio Farda, as of 17 April 2020, Ahmad Vaezi was the director of the Islamic Propagation Office of Qom Seminary (which according to Radio Fardo had a 2020-2021 Approved Budget of $35,714,285 and is one of the religious organizations that assist in spreading the Islamic Republic's message at home and abroad).

== Bibliography ==
He has written many books in different spheres as follows:

- Alternation of theological understanding
- Theological society, Civilized society
- Man from Islam perspective
- Bedaye Al Hekam (the Beginning of Wisdoms)
- Theocracy
- Islamic rule
- Introduction to Hermeneutics
- Shia Political thought.
- theory of context

== See also ==
- Mahmoud Mar'ashi Najafi
- Seyed Ali Asghar Dastgheib
- Rasul Jafarian
