= Al-Nihayah =

Book by Shaykh Tusi

Al-Nihāyah (Arabic: النهایة) is one of the greatest juridical books among Shia. This book contains many narratives and juridical rulings.The author of al-Nihayah is Shaykh Tusi, a prominent historical Shi'i jurist.

== Author ==
Abu Jaʿfar Muhammad b. al-Hasan b. ʿAli b. al-Hasan al-Tusi was born in Tus in Iran in the year 996 AD/385 of the Islamic era. Al-Shaikh al-Tusi grew up in Tus and began his studies there. In 1018 AD/408 A.H. he left Tus to study in Baghdad. There he first studied under al-Shaikh al-Mufid, who died in 1022 AD/413 A.H. Leadership of the Shi'ite scholars then fell to al-Sharif al-Murtada. The latter remained in this position until his death in 1045 AD/436 A.H. During this time al-Shaikh al-Tusi was closely associated with al-Sharif al-Murtada. His vast scholarship and learning made him a natural successor of al-Sharif al-Murtada as the leading spokesman of Shi'ite Islam. So impressive was his learning that the Abbasid caliph, al-Qadir, attended his lectures and sought to honour him.according to some scholars, Sheykh Tusi established the religious of Najaf by immigration from Baghdad. He could arranged the disorganized Najaf in that Time. He was the pupil of Sayyed Murtada and Shaykh Mufid and try to transform the religious shia heir to there. He tried to impart discipline to his students by writing some books like Amali and also encouraged his students to participate in discursive and inferential jurisprudence.

== The book ==
The complete name of the book is "al-Nihayah fi Mujarrid-i Fiqh wa Fatawa".Tusi collected Shi'i juridical narrations without mentioning their documentation. In fact, al-Nihayah is considered as summary of his book called Tahdhib. According to Ibn Idris, the style of Tusi in the al-Nihayah is similar to that of Akhbaris. In other word, Tusi just tried to collect narrations regarding jurisprudence. There is no deduction and reasoning in Nihayah and he given to interpret the Hadith or traditions solely. it is said that people acted according to Fatwas of book of Nihayah even eighty years after the Death of Tusi. According to Danesh-pajooh, there is no doubt that Nihayah has written after Tahdhib and before Istibsar. Tusi try to narrate the legal opinions according to actual reports and sayings by shia's Imams.

== Scholars and permissions of narration ==
There are some scholars who had the right of narration of the book of Nihayah. some of them are as follows:

- Abu Muhammad Rehan Ibn Abdullah Habashi
- Sayyid Abu Jafar Mamatiri
- Najm Addin Taman Ibn Ahmad Shami Ameli
- Muhaqqiq Hilli
- Sayyed Mahmoud Taleqani

and other scholars who had permission to narrate and read.

== Commentators ==
Al-Nihayah has many commentary and commentators. The most eminent of them was the son of Tusi namely Abu Ali Hasan Tusi. Also Qotb Addin Ravandi counted as one of the important commentators of the book because of writing five commentary on it. other commentators are somebodies like Abi Nizam Sahreshti, Muhaqiq Hilli.

== Translation ==
This book is translated into English by Abū al-Faz̤l ʻIzzatī by the name of Concise Description of Islamic Law and Legal Opinions.

== See also ==
- Shaykh Tusi
- Shia Islam
