= Najaf Lakzaee =

Najaf Lakzaee (born 1969) is a researcher of religious and political sciences. He holds a PhD in political studies from Imam Sadiq University and has passed Islamic seminary education up to the level of ijtihad. He is the lecturer in the political sciences department of Baqir al-'Ulum University, was previously a cultural deputy of the Ahl al-Bayt (a) World Assembly, and is now the director of Islamic Sciences and Culture Academy.

== Life ==
Najaf Lakzaee was born in Sistan in 1969 and spent his childhood and primary school in his birthplace. He entered the seminary of Marham Sharifi in 1982 and entered the Islamic seminary of Qom in 1985. Simultaneous with his studies in the seminary from 1982 to 2003, he obtained his BA, MA, and PhD in political sciences while he was already the director of the Research Center for Political Sciences and Thought. He was the previous cultural deputy of the Ahl al-Bayt (a) World Assembly. He has also been the director of the Islamic Sciences and Culture Academy and the research deputy of the Office for Islamic Propagation of the seminary of Qom since November 2014. According to the website of the Islamic Sciences and Culture Academy, Najaf Lakzaee has obtained full professorship.

== Persian works ==
- Tarikh-e farhangi siyasi-ye Iran-e Mo'aser, Center for Management of Women Seminaries, the office for compilation of educational texts and sources, Mohajer publications, Qom, 2012.
- Tahavvolat-e siyasi ejtema'i-ye Iran-e Mo'aser, Islamic Sciences and Culture Academy, Qom, 2011.
- Daramadi bar mostanadat-e Qur'ani-ye falsafeh-ye siyasi-ye Imam Khomeini, Center for Culture and Teachings of the Qur'an, Qom, 2007.
- Chalesh-e siyasat-e dini va nazm-e soltani, Islamic Sciences and Culture Academy, Qom, 2006. (Islamic Republic of Iran's Book of the Year, announced as "praise-worthy" and also the winner of bi-annual research of Islamic government)
- Sireh-ye Piyambar-e A'zam (a) dar gozar az jame'eh-ye jaheli be jame'e-ye Islami, Bustan-e Ketab, Qom, 2006.
- Seyr-e tatavvor-e tafakkor-e siyasi-ye Imam Khomeini, Islamic Sciences and Culture Academy, Tehran, 2004.
- Andisheh-ye siyasi-ye Sadr al-Muta'allihin, Bustan-e Ketab, Islamic Sciences and Culture Academy, Qom, 2002 (Seminary's Book of the Year, Religious Researcher's Book of the Year)
- Andisheh-ye siyasi-ye Ayatullah Motahhari, Bustan-e Ketab, Islamic Sciences and Culture Academy, Qom, 2002 (with collaboration of a group of teachers)
- Rawdat al-anwar 'Abbasi (correction and research), Bustan-e Ketab, Islamic Sciences and Culture Academy, Qom, 2002.
- Andisheh-ye siyasi-ye Muhaqqiq Sabzevari, Bustan-e Ketab, Islamic Sciences and Culture Academy, Qom, 2001 (Saminary's Book of the Year)
- Zamineha-ye Enqelab-e Islami, A'immeh, 1998 (with collaboration of Mansur Mirahmadi)
- Gofteman-e Mahdaviyyat: Sokhanrani va maqaleh-ha-ye gofteman-e panjom, Najaf Lakzaee, Ali Shari'atmadari, Mohammad Hadi Ma'refat, Ali Baqi Nasrabadi, Morteza Shirudi, Alireza Sadra, 'Abdulqayyum Sajjadi, Mohammad Reza Mani Far, Bustan-eKetab, Qom.

== Arabic works ==
Some of his works is translated to Arabic:

- Afaq al-fikr al-siyasi 'ind Sadr al-Muta'allihin, Najaf Lakzaee, Walid Muhsin (translator), Mu'assisa Da'irat al-Ma'arif Fiqh
- Afaq al-fikr al-siyasi 'ind al-Muhaqqiq Sabziwari, Najaf Lakzaee, Muhammad 'Abd al-Razzaq (translator), Mu'assisa Da'irat al-Ma'arif Fiqh
- Afaq al-fikr al-siyasi 'ind al-Ustadh al-Shahid Mutahhari, Najaf Lakzaee, Walid Muhsin (translator), 'Adnan Husayni (editor), Mu'assisa Da'irat al-Ma'arif Fiqh

== Papers ==
Najaf Lakzaee has written many articles, some of which have been published in periodicals such as Strategic Studies Quarterly, Scientific-research-based Political Sciences, Matin, Isra', Islamic Revolution Studies, Islamic Revolution Research Journal, Political Knowledge, Kheradnameh Sadra, etc. In Noor Magazine information bank, 71 of his articles in the mentioned journals and other magazines are indexed.

== See also ==
- Najaf Lakzaee at Google Scholar: https://scholar.google.com/citations?user=aR7KG7QAAAAJ&hl=en
