= Marashi, Iran =

Marashi مرعشي
- Village
- Location within Iran
- Coordinates: 31°26′14″N 48°48′51″E
- Country: Iran
- Province: Khuzestan
- County: Bavi
- Bakhsh: Veys
- Rural District: Veys

Population (2006)
  - Total: 79
- Time zone: UTC+3:30 (IRST)
  - Summer (DST): UTC+4:30 (IRDT)

Marashi (Persian: مرعشي, also Romanized as Mar‘ashī) is a village in Veys Rural District, Veys District, Bavi County, Khuzestan Province, Iran. At the 2006 census, its population was 79, in 12 families.
