= Mar'ashi Najafi Library =

Ayatollah Mar'ashi Najafi Library
- کتابخانه آیت‌الله مرعشی نجفی
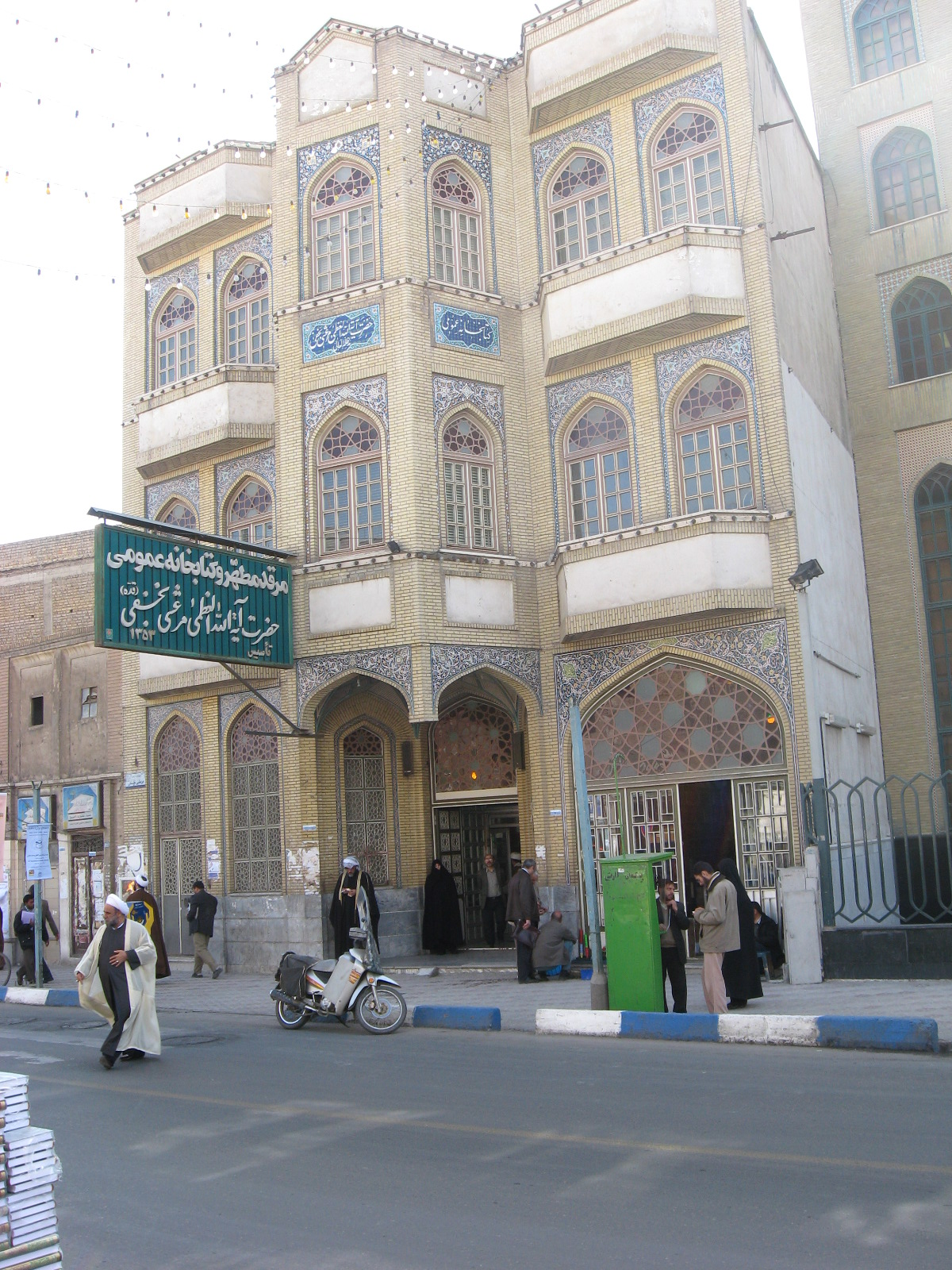
- Library of Ayatollah Marashi Najafi in Qom
- 34.638999°N 50.8772222°E
- Location: Iran
- Type: Public
- Established: 1963
- Reference to legal mandate: Resolution 205 of the Supreme Council of Cultural Revolution (1997)

Other information
- Director: Mahmoud Marashi Najafi

The Ayatollah Marashi Najafi Library, in Qom, is the third largest library in Iran, after the Central Library of Astan Quds Razavi, and the Library of Parliament, as well as being the world's third largest Islamic library, with more than 250,000 books, 25,000 of them online.

== Founder ==
The library began as the personal library of the founder, Ayatollah Marashi Najafi, a prominent Islamic scholar known for his dedication to religious scholarship and education throughout his life, who began collecting rare texts as a student, partly to keep them from being possessed by the British colonial authorities. Marashi Najafi died shortly after laying the foundation stone of a new library building in 1989.

His will states:

Bury me at the entrance of the library so that the feet of the researchers of Islamic sciences step beside my grave.

== History and management ==
Since Najafi's death, ownership and management of the library has since passed to his son, Mahmoud Marashi, who is instructed by his father's will.

The library was founded in 1963, with further expansion in 1974 and 1988. It is situated one hundred yards from the Fatima Masumeh Shrine in Qom, where Marashi Najafi was a cleric, as well as being near his own tomb. The cost of the library was at first personally financed by its founder and his descendants; but, beginning in 1997, the library began to be funded as a governmental institution, under Resolution 205 of the Supreme Council of Cultural Revolution, with its operation still overseen by Marashi Najafi's family, but in cooperation with the Ministry of Culture and Islamic Guidance.

Ayatollah Ruhollah Khomeini once remarked that, "the library of Ayatollah Marashi Najafi is an unparalleled library and perhaps unrivaled in Iran". The library contains books in at least 30 different languages, including Turkish, Urdu, and Arabic. The possession, maintenance, and showcasing of Hebrew books once surprised some American and British rabbis, who were guests of the Iranian government, and who had allotted 3 hours of time to visit Qom. One rabbi said that he imagined that, Qom being the center of the revolution, Hebrew books would be burned and the ashes scattered to the wind; but he saw that, instead, such works were given the same respect as Muslim books, and that Jewish prophets were well regarded. So charmed were the rabbis that they devoted the entire time of their stay in Qom to visiting the library.

== Holdings ==
- As of 2003, manuscripts, rare books, and lithographs amounted to 60,000 in number, including 31,000 volumes on manuscript basics, words, and ideas; logic and philosophy; theosophy and mysticism; and the Hadith; with 65% in Arabic, and the rest in Persian, Turkish, Urdu, and other languages. Among these volumes are unique texts of many famous Islamic authors. The most ancient of these treasures show the history of the Qur'an from the late 2nd and 3rd centuries A.H.; including the oldest two-component version of the Qur'an in Kufic script, of Ali bin Hilal, also known as Ibn Abolhasan Ali Ibn Hilal, as well as two volumes of interpretation; the Nahj al-Balagha of Sharif Razi; the Gospel in Latin; and copies of the Avesta.
- There are more than 4,000 volumes of photographs of manuscripts, as well as 12,200 microfilms and lists of books of the 10th and 11th centuries—printed in Arabic, English, Turkish, Latin, and Armenian—as well as more than 30,000 rare lithographs.
- There are over 1,500,000 printed books in Persian, Arabic, Turkish, Urdu, and other non-Latin languages. This collection is housed on three floors of the new buildings. There is also an archival library of books of Communist and anti-Islamic groups.
- The periodical section has more than 2,500 journals and newspapers in Persian, Arabic, Turkish, and Urdu, as well as a number of old magazines and newspapers, in lithograph, from the time of the Qajar dynasty.
- Handwritten documents over the previous five centuries number 500,000 so far. These include edicts—of kings, princes, rulers—regarding marriage, etc.
- Non-literary objects in the library include coins, stamps, old photo albums, other old color and black-and-white photos, astrolabes, audio and video tapes, and computer disks.
- There are old and new geographic maps and atlases of the world, and geographic references in different languages.
- The works of the library founder, Marashi Najafi, to be put on display.

== Departments ==
- Public Service: Great Hall of Avicenna, Seminary Hall, Hall of Nasir al-Din al-Tusi, Hall of Al-Shaykh Al-Mufid, and the book store.
- Special Resources and Services Center (Research Center): the cataloging, study, and correction of Islamic manuscripts, genealogies, etc.
- Protection Center Resource Library: this center will be for the care, repair, and re-binding of books, handwritten documents, micrographs, etc.
- Technical Service Center: the center for the selection, ordering, registering, preparing, and cataloging of books, as well as a documentation center, and computer center.
- Computer Center: established in 1996 to develop a centralized information system, provide technical support, standardise cataloging, manage collection and computer network development. Also in this section are catalogers and bibliographers maintaining a written list of manuscripts in the library, having published thirty volumes of the catalog so far, and anticipating 60 volumes in total.
- Center for Qom History: this is the center of the collection of books and articles about Qom, which are in different languages, including genealogies.
- Center for World Libraries: this center was established in 1990, in order to maintain a guide to libraries that have Islamic manuscript collections.

== Gallery ==
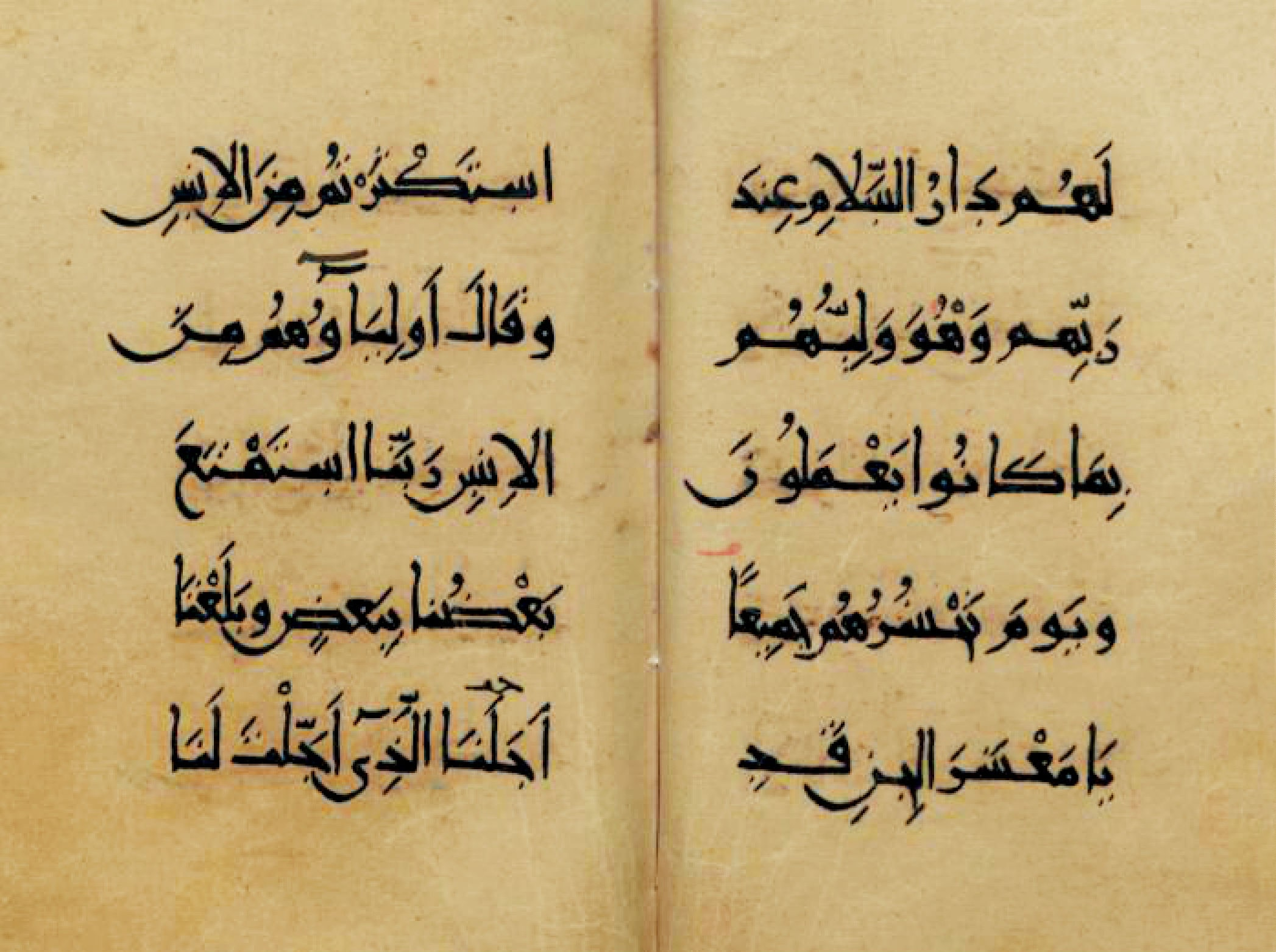
Folio from the Qur'an manuscript traditionally attributed to Ibn al-Bawwab, dated 392 AH/1002 CE

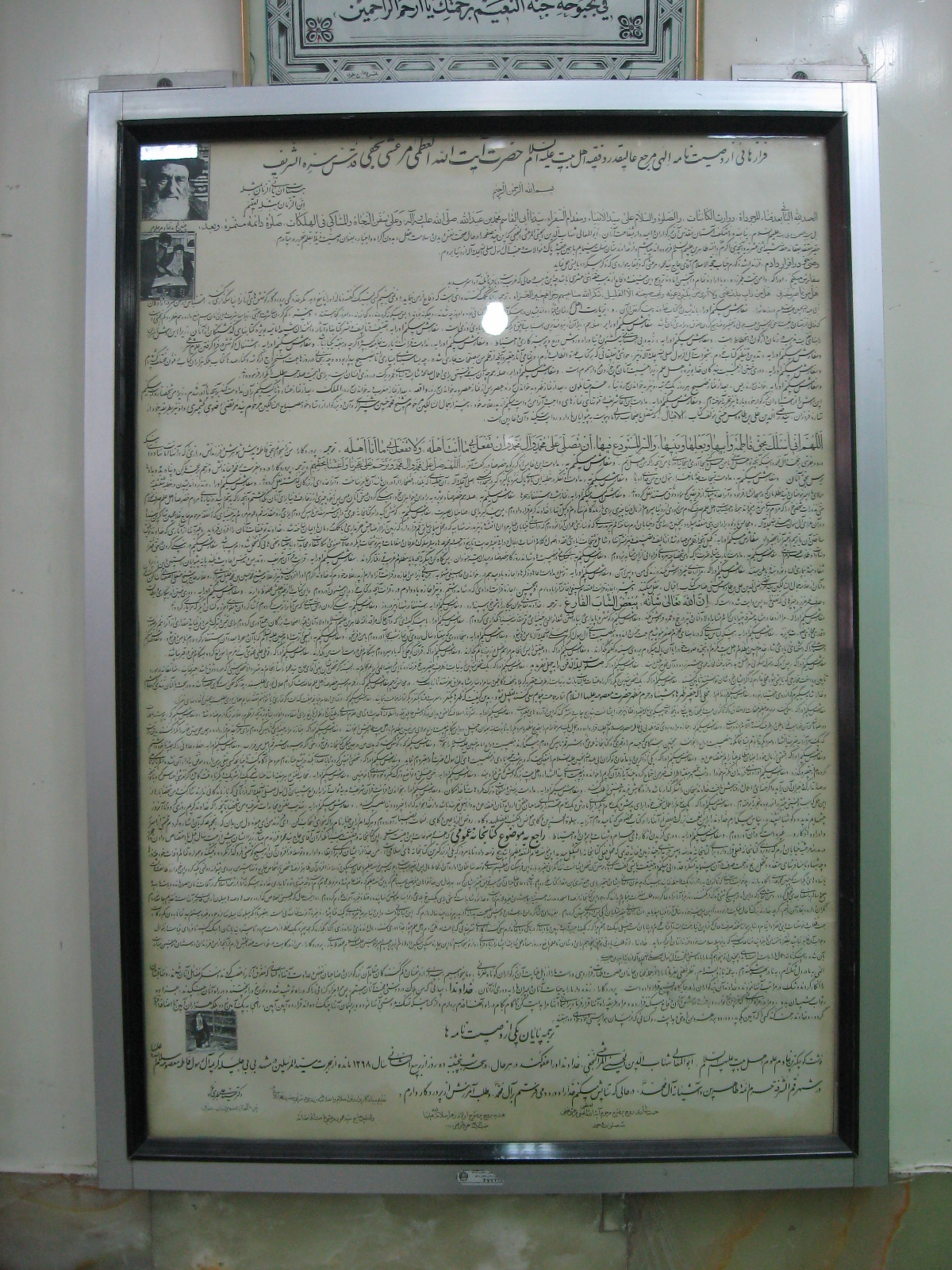
Excerpts of the testament of Ayatollah Marashi Najafi at the entrance to the Library

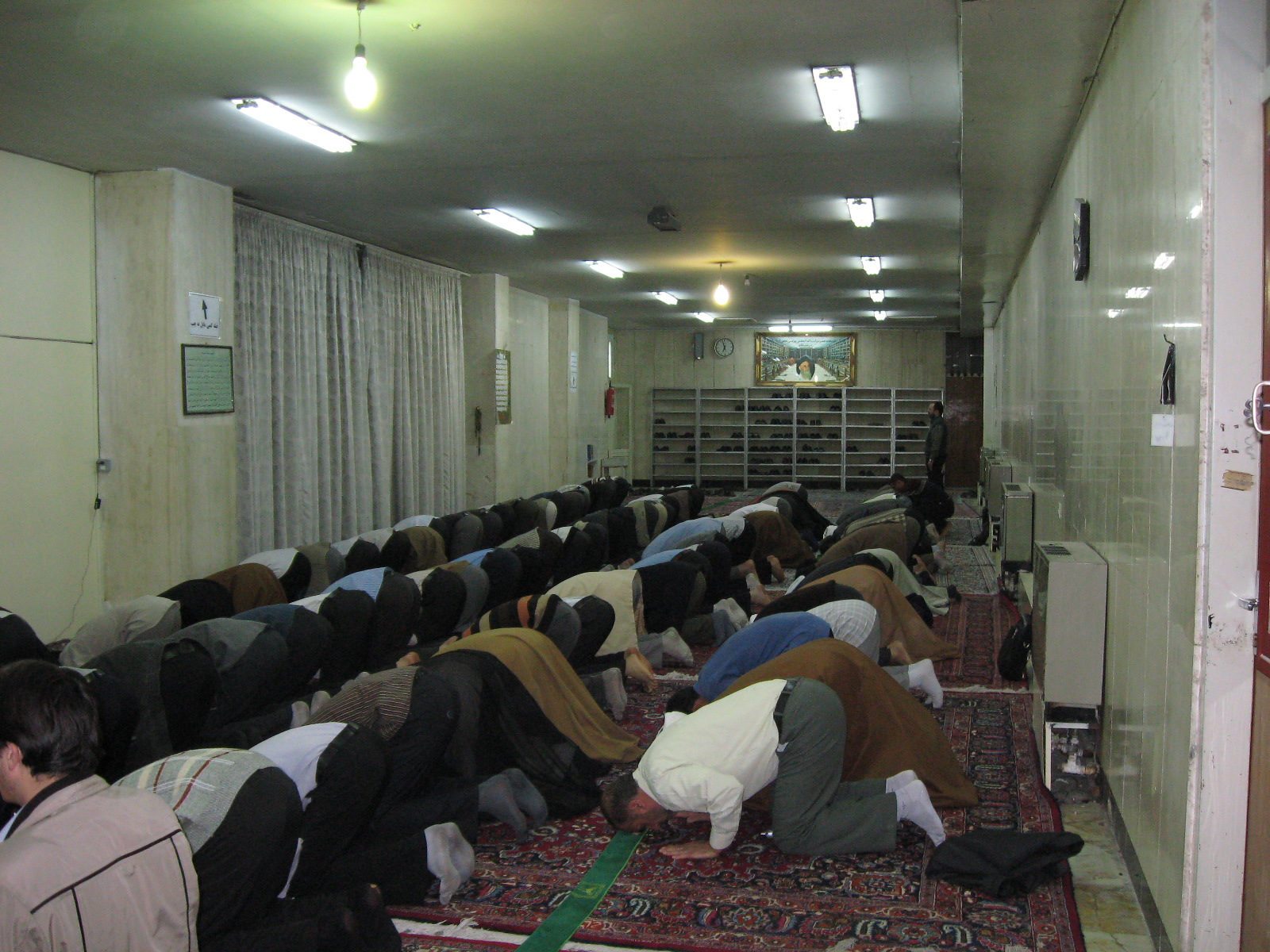
Library prayer room

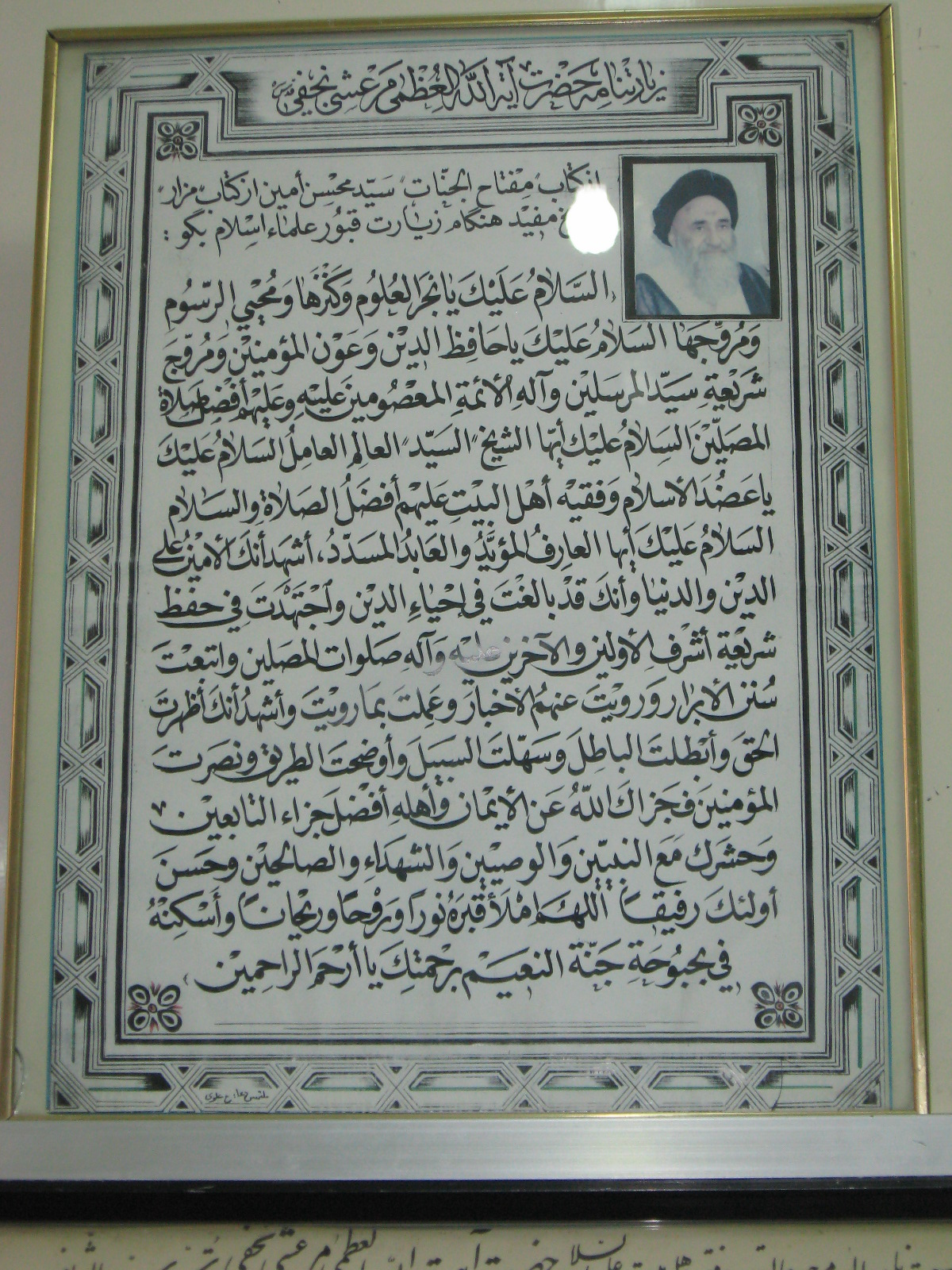
Pilgrimage scholars at the entrance to the Library

== See also ==
- List of libraries in Iran
