= Shahab ud-Din Mar'ashi Najafi =

Iraqi Grand Ayatollah (1897-1990)

Grand Ayatollah Sayyid Sayed Muhammad Hussain Mar'ashi Najafi
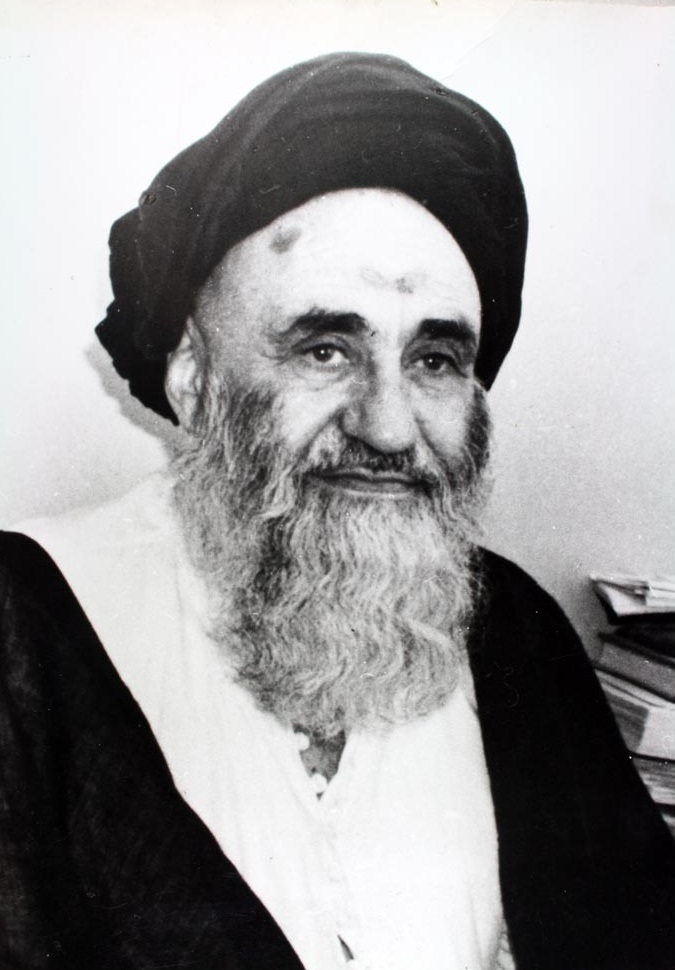
- Syed Muhammad Hussain Mar'ashi Najafi in his office at Najaf, 1960's

Personal life
- Born: July 21, 1897 Najaf, Iraq
- Died: August 29, 1990 (aged 93) Qom, Iran
- Resting place: In his Library in Qom, Iran
- Main interest(s): Hadith, Fiqh
- Notable work: Mu'jam rijal al-hadith

Religious life
- Religion: Islam
- Denomination: Shi'a
- Jurisprudence: Ja'fari (Usuli)
- Creed: Twelver

Muslim leader
- Based in: Najaf, Iraq
- Period in office: 1960–1990

Shahab ad-Din Muhammad Hussain Mar'ashi Najafi (July 21, 1897 – August 29, 1990) (Arabic: اية الله العظمى السيد شهابالدين الحسينى المرعشى نجفى) was an Iraqi-Iranian Shia Grand Ayatollah and Marja'.

== Education ==
He first mastered tajweed and learned the doctrines of tafsir which had been taught to him by his father, as well as Mirza Aboll Hassan Meshkini, Mohammad Hossein Shirazi, Hab Al-Din Shahrestani and Ibrahim Shafei Rafaei Baghdadi. Najafi was formally educated in the hawza of Najaf, and also spent three years studying in the Iraqi cities of Samarra and Kadhimiya; two important centres of Shia learning. He excelled in areas of fiqh, `ilm al-rijal, 'aql, and kalam. Najafi received ijazahs from numerous scholars, among them Lady Amin.

== Teaching ==
Upon attaining the level of ijtihad in 1925, Najafi travelled to Qom, Iran, at the request of Abdul-Karim Ha'eri Yazdi, one of the most important revivalists of the Qom hawza. He stayed in the city of Qom until his death. He led the prayers in the shrine of Fatemah Masumeh for over half a century. Among those that visited Najafi during his life in Qom include Rashid Ridha, Henry Corbin, and the Bengali poet Rabindranath Tagore.

== Manuscript collection and library ==
Whilst studying in Najaf, Najafi became growingly concerned with the immense wealth of Islamic knowledge that was being lost in the displacement and destruction of Shia texts. He took it upon himself to purchase as many rare books and manuscripts that he could on his modest clerical stipend in order to preserve them. When his stipend was exhausted, he took a job at a rice cleaning factory in Najaf, performed Qada prayers and fasts on behalf of others, and ate only one meal a day in order to raise enough money to purchase these books.

Najafi continued to collect these rare Shia manuscripts once he migrated to Iran. In 1965, he presented 278 rare manuscripts in Arabic and Persian to the University of Tehran College of Theology and Divinity. He would continue to donate many of these books to libraries across Iran.

In 1965, he was able to found the Marashiyah Islamic Seminary in Qom, where he allocated a number of rooms for the purpose of housing these books. It was not long before these rooms were formally designated as a library.

The large number of visitors to this library soon required that it be expanded. For this purpose, 1,000 square feet (93 m^{2}) of adjoining land was purchased in order to expand the existing library in 1970.

In 1974, the reference section of this library was inaugurated. 1,600 rare Shia manuscripts were added to this collection, which was followed by a further 500 manuscripts that were donated to the library's treasury.

In 1989, the supreme guide of the Islamic Republic of Iran, Ruhollah Khomeini issued a decree ordering that the library be built an extension of 16,000 square feet (1,500 m^{2}). At present both the old and the new buildings of the grand library occupies a total area of 21,000 sq. meters. Sayid Najafi laid the first stone of the foundation of the new library.

== Political Activities ==
Ayatollah Marashi Najafi supported Imam Khomeini's movement and in 1963, after Imam Khomeini's arrest, he sent a strongly worded statement to the Pahlavi regime, demanding his release. He also confirmed the authority of Ayatollah Khomeini and in 1964, he gave a speech against the capitulation bill. He took a stand in protest against the insulting article published by Ettela'at newspaper about Ayatollah Khomeini in 1977, and after the victory of the Islamic Revolution, he endorsed the Revolutionary Council and the interim government and called on the people to defend the country against the Iraqi attack.

== Death and will ==
In his will, Najafi gave his son, Mahmoud Marashi Najafi, detailed advice on religious observances and study, good relations with close relatives, mercy to the poor and needy, and not wasting his time. He gave instructions regarding his own burial and grave, and enjoined his son if possible to use some of his wealth as Radd al-Madhaalim (money given to the poor as payment of possible unknown debts) on his father's behalf, in case he had any dues outstanding.
