= Mohammad Bagher Sabzevari =

Iranian Shiite scholar and jurist (1608–1679)

Ayatollah Mohammad Bagher Sabzevari
- محمدباقر سبزواری

Personal life
- Born: Mohammad Bagher ibn Mohammad Moe'men Sabzevari; 1608 Naman, Safavid Iran
- Died: 19 April 1679 (aged 70–71) Isfahan, Safavid Iran
- Resting place: Mashhad
- Spouse: Sarv Ghad Khanom
- Children: Mohammad Jafar Sabzevari; Mohammad Hadi Sabzevari; Mohammad Mahdi Sabzevari; Mohammad Ebrahim Sabzevari

Religious life
- Religion: Islam
- School: Shia
- Sect: Twelver
- Jurisprudence: Ja'fari

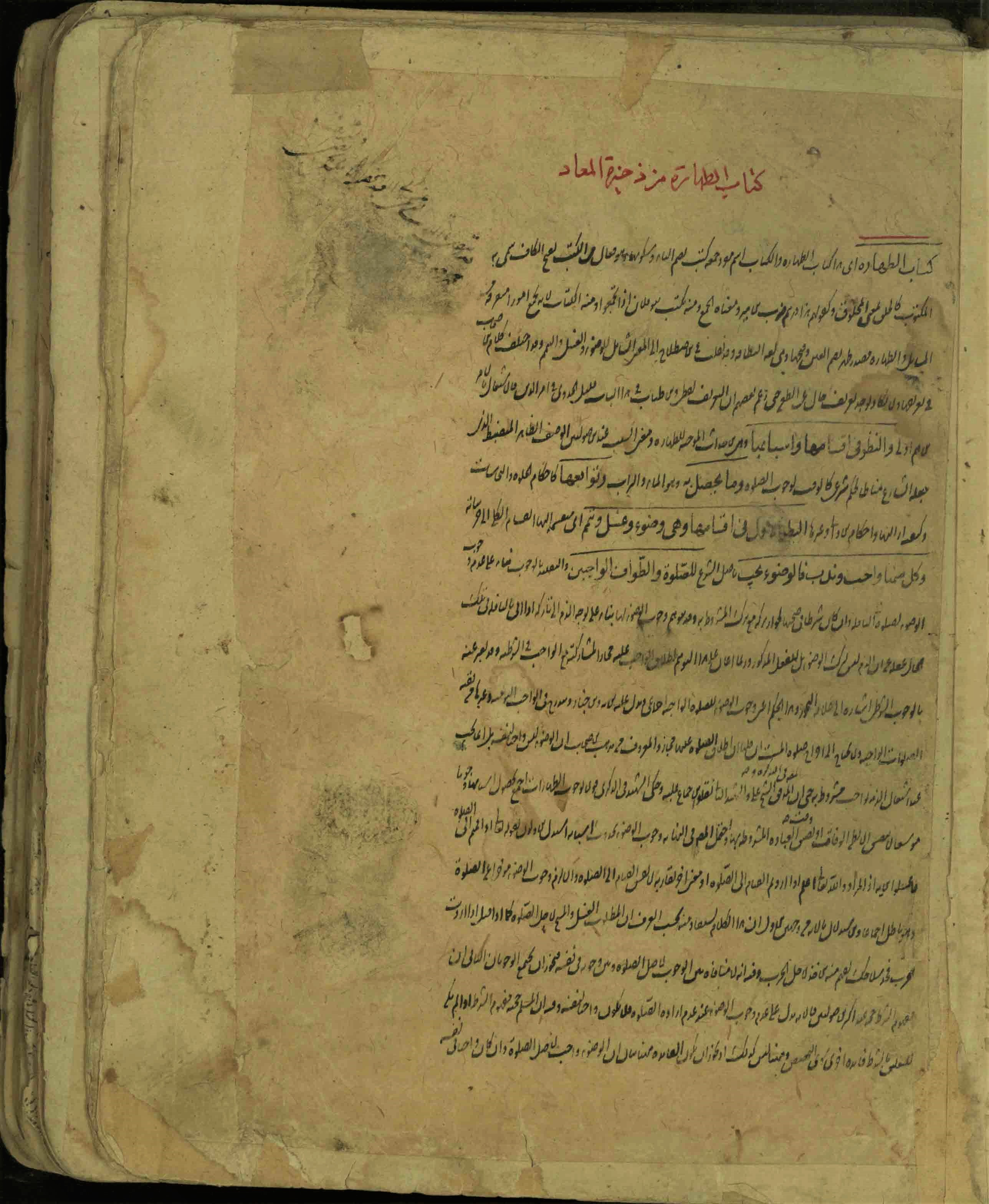
Manuscript of "Zakhirat al-Ma'ad fi Sharh al-Ershad", First Chapter, "Kitab al-Taharah" by Mohammad Bagher Sabzevari, 1641

Mohammad Bagher Sabzevari (Persian: محمدباقر سبزواری) known as Mohaghegh Sabzevari (Persian: محقق سبزواری) (born in 1608, died on 19 April 1679) was an Iranian Faqih and Shia scholar from the 11th century AH, Shaykh al-Islām and the Imam of Friday Prayer of Isfahan.

Mohaghegh Sabzevari was born in Naman village around Sabzevar and settled in Isfahan and was raised in the jurisprudence philosophy school of Isfahan. He was a principled Islamic jurist, theologian and sage. He had a friendly relationship with Mullah Mohsen Fayz Kashani. In rational sciences he was one of the students of Mir Fendereski and in traditional sciences he was one of the students of Mullah Hassan Ali Shoushtari and some other great masters of the time.

== Life ==
Mohammad Bagher Sabzevari was born in the village of Naman around the city of Sabzevar, Razavi Khorasan Province in 1608 and is the son of Mohammad Mo'men al-Sharif al-Sabzevari (died around 1619). During the reign of Shah Abbas I, after the death of his father, he went to Isfahan with his family to continue his education. After a while, he became one of the leading scholars of his time, so that at the request of Shah Abbas II, he became the Imam of Friday Prayer of Shah Mosque and Shaykh al-Islām of Isfahan. He was also appointed director of Molla Abdollah School.

He was brought up in the philosophical school of jurisprudence of Isfahan, which was both a school of jurisprudence and a philosophical. He had a close relationship and friendship with Khalifeh Soltan (Prime Minister of Shah Abbas the Great, Shah Safi I and Shah Abbas II), Mullah Mohsen Fayz Kashani, Agha Hossein Khansari (her sister husband) and Seyyed Abdol Hossein Khatoonabadi, the famous 11th century AH writer and historian.

== His masters ==
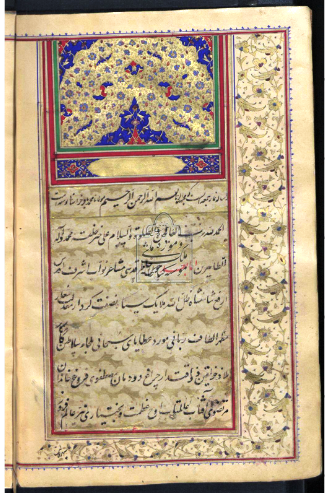
A treatise on Friday prayers in Persian by Mohammad Bagher Sabzevari

Mohaghegh Sabzevari has used famous professors during his studies. Some of his masters have been outstanding in his time:

- Baha' al-din al-'Amili

Among his professors in traditional sciences are the following:

- Mohammad Taghi Majlesi, known as the Majlesi Avval
- Mullah Hassan Ali Shoushtari (Abolhassan Tustari Esfahani, died 1664, author of "Al-Tebyan")
- Mullah Heydar Ali Esfahani
- Seyyed Hossein ibn Heydar Ameli

Among his professors in the rational sciences are the following:

- Mir Fendereski (Mir Hosseini, 1562–1640), famous sage of the 11th century AH
- Qazi Moez al-Din Hossein

Mohaghegh Sabzevari has been allowed "the narration to preserve and transmit the hadith to future generations" from several students of Baha' al-din al-'Amili, who were great scholars:

- Mohammad Taghi Majlesi
- Noor al-Din Ali ibn Hossein ibn Abi al-Hassan Ameli (1658)
- Mir Sharaf al-Din Ali ibn Hojjat Sholestani
- Hossein ibn Heydar ibn Qamarkorki, known as Hossein Mofti Esfahani (died 1632)

His other professors include:

- Sheikh Ahmad Bohrani
- Sheikh Hossein Moqerri Ameli
- Mola Heydar ibn Mohammad Khansari Esfahani

== Works ==
- Zakhirat al-Ma'ad fi Sharhe al-Ershad (Arabic: ذخیرة المعاد فی شرح الارشاد, English meaning: The repertoire of the resurrection in the explanation of the guidance): It is an Islamic jurisprudential book that covers the subject of purification until the end of the discussion of Hajj. This book is a description of the book "Ershad al-Az'han ela Ahkam al-Iman" (Arabic: ارشاد الاذهان الی احکام الایمان, English meaning: Guidance of the Minds to the Provisions of Faith) by Allamah Al-Hilli, which has been considered by great scholars since its writing, and a number of notes and explanations have been written on it, and it has also been cited and argued in the detailed books of Islamic jurisprudence. The date of writing of the first volume (Arabic: کتاب الطهارة, English meaning: Book of Purification) is mentioned December 1640 and at the end of the second volume (Arabic: کتاب الصلاة, English meaning: Book of Prayer), the date of writing is mentioned August 1643. The date of writing of Ketab al-Zakat (Arabic: کتاب زکاة, English meaning: Book of Zakat) and Ketab Hajj (Arabic: کتاب حج, English meaning: Book of Hajj) is not mentioned but the date of writing of Ketab al-Sowm (Arabic: کتاب الصوم, English meaning: Book of Fasting) is mentioned September 1645 in the third volume.
- Kefayat al-Ahkam (Arabic: کفایة الاحکام, English meaning: The adequacy of judgments): It is a book of Islamic jurisprudence that includes all the chapters of jurisprudence (Fiqh). This book has also been popular with the names Kefayat al-Moqtased (Arabic: کفایة المقتصد, English meaning: The adequacy of the frugal) and Kefayat al-Fiqh (Arabic: کفایة الفقه, English meaning: The sufficiency of jurisprudence). Mohammad Ali ibn Mohammad Hassan Nahwi Ardakani has translated this book as Hedayat al-Aelam (Arabic: هدایة الاعلام, English meaning: The guidance of media). This book has had a special place in the eyes of Imamieh jurists and since its writing many annotations and explanations have been written on it.

The reputation of the books "Zakhirat al-Ma'ad fi Sharhe al-Ershad" and "Kefayat al-Ahkam" has caused that in the books of rijal and Islamic jurisprudence, Mohammad Bagher Sabzevari has been introduced as "the owner of the Zakhirat and Kefayat":

- Rozat al-Anvar Abbasi (Arabic: روضة الانوار عباسی, English meaning: Recommendations for Abbasi): It is a book about the ethics and style of governance that was written at the request of Abbas II of Persia in 1663 in an introduction and two sections. In the introduction, Mohaghegh Sabzevari points out the reasons why people need kings and the factors of the permanence and decline of the rule of kings. This book is in Persian and is about political ethics.
- Resaleh fi Tahrim al-Ghina (Arabic: رساله فی تحریم الغناء, English meaning: The treatise on the prohibition of singing): This treatise is about Ghina' and music and rejects the theory of Fayz Kashani. In this book, Mohaghegh Sabzevari has brought all the verses and narrations that have been included from the companions of The Fourteen Infallibles in the prohibition of Ghina'.
- Resaleh ee dar Namaz Jomeh (Persian: رساله‌ای در نماز جمعه, English meaning: A treatise on Friday prayers): This book is in Persian and Mohaghegh Sabzevari has written this treatise in Arabic with the title of "Resalah fi Salah Al-Jumu'ah" (Arabic: رساله فی صلاه الجمعه).
- Hashieh ala al-Shafa (Arabic: حاشیة علی الشفاء, English meaning: Footnote on the al-Shafa): This book is a footnote on the theology section of Avicenna 's book Healing. In this work, Mohaghegh Sabzevari only describes the difficulties and solves the problems of the book and does not enter into the disputes over the topics.
- Jameh al-Ziaraat Abbasi (Arabic: جامع الزیارات عباسی, English meaning: Comprehensive pilgrimage for Abbasi): About Farsi prayers and pilgrimages in nine chapters in Persian language in credit of Abbas II of Persia.

Seyyed Mosleh al-Din Mahdavi has quoted forty books and treatises by Mohammad Bagher Sabzevari in 1992, citing references, and has pointed out that Sazevari's other books may have been found by studying reference books and the list of libraries:

- Khalafiah (Arabic: خلافیة, English meaning: Controversial issues): It is written in Persian for Abbas the Great on worship subject.
- Resaleh ee dar Tahlile Ghina' dar Quran (Persian: رساله‌ای در تحلیل غناء در قرآن, English meaning: A treatise on the analysis of Ghina' in the Quran)
- Resaleh ee dar Fiqh (Persian: رساله‌ای در فقه, English meaning: A treatise on jurisprudence): Mohammad Bagher Sabzevari has written this treatise for Abbas II of Persia and it includes all the chapters of Islamic jurisprudence.
- Resaleh Amalieh (Persian: رساله عملیه, English meaning: Practical treatise): Mohammad Bagher Sabzevari wrote this book for his followers and compiled it at the request of Mirza Mahdi ibn Mirza Reza Hosseini Khorasani in 1670.
- Hashieh ala Sharh al-Isharat (Arabic: حاشیة علی شرح الاشارات, English meaning: Footnotes on Sharh al-Isharat): This book contains some footnotes on the description of the book Sharh al-Isharat of Nasir al-Din al-Tusi, the compilation of which has been completed on 27 May 1665.
- Mafatih al-Nejat Abbasi (Arabic: مفاتیح النجاة عباسی, English meaning: The keys of salvation for Abbasi): This book contains the famous and narrated prayers of The Fourteen Infallibles, and consists of an introduction - which is about virtue, etiquette, and the time for prayers to be answered - and 27 chapters. Mohammad Bagher Sabzevari wrote this compilation at the request of Abbas II of Persia and completed it on 28 September 1646.
- Sharhe Hadise Berr al-Valedayn (Arabic: شرح حدیث برّ الوالدّین, English meaning: Explanation of the hadith of righteousness with the parents): Mohammad Bagher Sabzevari wrote this work in his own handwriting during his trip to the Masjid al-Haram for the collection of Sheikh Shams al-Din Hussein ibn Muhammad Shirazi. The date of writing of this work is September 1652.
- Ekhtiarat Ayyaam (Persian: اختیارات ایام, English meaning: Options of the day): This work is a research on the blessed and blest days and the unfortunate days of the ancient Islamic, Roman and Persian months, which is written in an introduction, three chapters and a conclusion, and each of them contains several articles and topics.
- Sharh Zubdat al-Usūl (Arabic: شرح زبدة الاصول, English meaning: Explanation of the Zubdat al-Usūl): This book is a description of the book "Zubdat al-Usūl" of Baha' al-din al-'Amili.
- Al-Radd ala Resalah Shobhat al-Estelzam (Arabic: الردّ علی رسالة شبهة الاستلزام, English meaning: Reply to the treatise of suspicion of obligation): This work is in response to Mohaghegh Khansari 's criticisms of Sabzevari's dissertation on the suspicion of obligation.

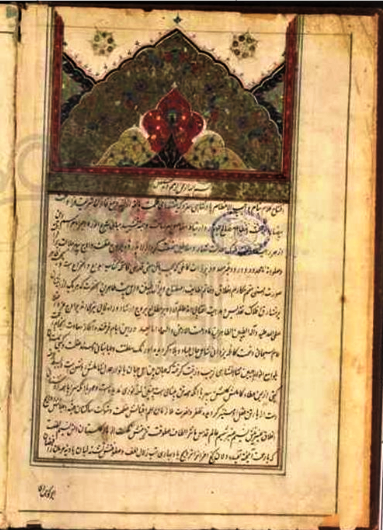
"Rozat al-Anvar Abbasi" written by Mohammad Bagher Sabzevari at the request of Abbas II of Persia in 1663.

- Sharhe Towheede Saduq (Persian: شرح توحید صدوق, English meaning: Explanation of the book "al-Towheed" of Shaykh al-Saduq)
- Rowzat al-Abrar (Arabic: روضة الابرار, English meaning: Recommendations of the righteous)
- Diwane Ash'Aar (Persian: دیوان اشعار, English meaning: Diwan of poetries)
- Ketabe Mazar (Persian: کتاب مزار, English meaning: Tomb Book)
- Manaaseke Hajj (Persian: مناسک حج, English meaning: Hajj Rituals)
- Resaleh ee dar Namaz va Roozeh (Persian: رساله‌ای در نماز و روزه, English meaning: A treatise on Salah and Fasting)
- Resaleh fi al-Ghusl (Arabic: رسالة فی الغسل, English meaning: A treatise on Ghusl)
- Resaleh fi Tahdeed al-Nahar al-Shar'ee (Arabic: رسالة فی تحدید النّهار الشرعی, English meaning: A treatise on determining the legal day)
- Hashieh ala Masalek al-Afham (Arabic: حاشیه علی مسالک الافهام, English meaning: Footnotes on the "Masalek al-Afham"): This book is a description of the book "Masalek al-Afham" of Zayn al-Din al-Juba'i al'Amili.
- Resaleh fi Mohgaddameh al-Vajeb (Arabic: رساله فی مقدمه الواجب, English meaning: A treatise in the introduction to the duty)
- Resaleh fi Fazilah al-Mut'ah (Arabic: رساله فی فضیله المتعه, English meaning: A treatise in the virtue of the mut'ah)
- Kefayat al-Fiqh (Arabic: کفایة الفقه, English meaning: Sufficiency of the Fiqh): This book contains about thirty thousand verses of poetry.

== Careers ==
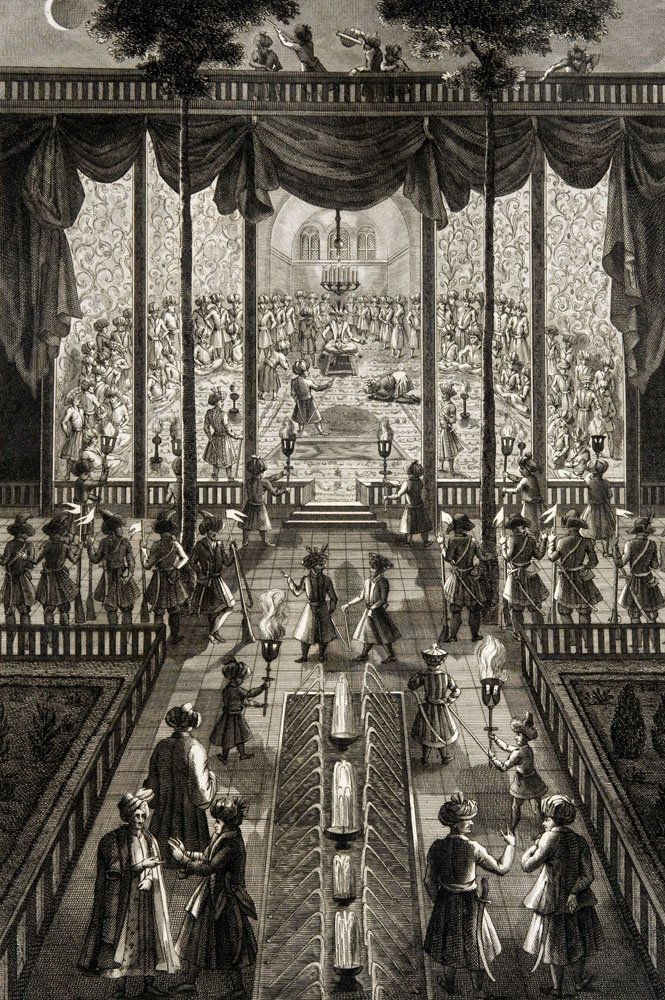
Suleiman of Persia's coronation ceremony on 24 March 1668 by Shaykh al-Islām of Isfahan.

- Shaykh al-Islām: The position of Shaykh al-Islami was considered the most important clerical post in the Safavid dynasty era, and in fact Shaykh al-Islam was the head of the clergy of the country, and all religious affairs were administered under his supervision. The exact date of his appointing as Shaykh al-Islam is not available. But Mohammad Bagher Sabzevari, as the Shaykh al-Islam of Isfahan, performed the second coronation and the renaming of Suleiman of Persia:

"Mohammad Bagher Khorasani (Sabzevari), who was the Shaykh al-Islam of the capital, performed the secondary coronation ceremony of Shah Suleiman, the change of name from Safi to Suleiman, and the sermon of the sitting in the Chehel Sotoun Hall on the 24 March 1668. At the end of the special coronation ceremony under his supervision, Mohammad Bagher Khorasani prayed and at the end of the sermon he raised his voice and called the king with the new name of Suleiman. And after hearing this name, everyone said, God willing, and after the orator recited the sermon as eloquently as possible, each of the audience stood up, kissed the king's foot, and returned to their place."

— Jean Chardin, Description of the coronation of Shah Suleiman Safavid and the events of two years later

- Imam of Friday Prayer at the Shah Mosque, Isfahan: There is no exact information about the exact date of appointing of Mohammad Bagher Sabzevari as the Friday Imamate of the Abbasi Grand Mosque (Shah Mosque). Apparently, his Imamate began after the year 1661, that is, after the death of Allama Majlesi I, and continued until the year of his death, 1679.
- Trusteeship of Molla Abdollah School in Isfahan: Molla Abdollah School is one of the most important religious schools in Isfahan. It was built in Isfahan by the order of Shah Abbas I as a place of teaching for Abdullah Shoushtari, one of the great scholars of the Safavid period. After the death of Abdullah Shoushtari (1612), the tutelage of the school was entrusted to his son, Mullah Hassan Ali. In this case it is stated: "Shah Abbas has dedicated the school on the condition that its teaching belongs to the descendants of Mullah Abdullah Shoushtari.". However, during the chancellor of Khalifeh Soltan, on the occasion, the tutelage was removed from him and handed over to Mohammad Bagher Sabzevari, and after that its tutelage remained in the family of Sabzevari.
- Revival of Bagherieh school in Mashhad: Mohammad Bagher Sabzevari was in the city of Mashhad in 1672 and in this year, he repaired the building of Bagherieh school. According to the text of the inscription, this school was built in 1672, during the reign of Shah Suleiman of the Safavid dynasty. Some historians believe that the school was founded before this date and then in 1672 by the efforts of Mohammad Bagher Sabzevari and by allocating some property, books and stuffs as a Waqf to the school, its building has been restored. For this reason, due to Mohammad Bagher Sabzevari presence and teaching at the school, it is known as "Mullah Mohammad Bagher school" and later as the "Bagherieh school".

== Contemporaries ==
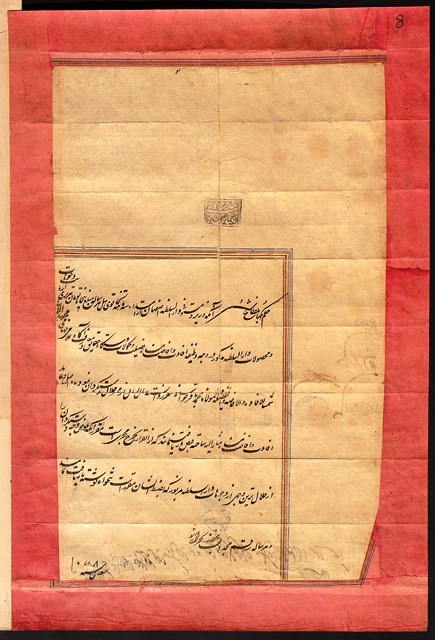
Abbas II of Persia decree for the salary of Mohammad Bagher Sabzevari, 21 May 1658.

Mohaghegh Sabzevari was a contemporary of four kings of the Safavid dynasty during his lifetime, and most of his political life was during the reigns of Abbas II of Persia and Suleiman of Persia (Safi II). His contemporary kings are:

- Abbas the Great (reign 1588–1629)
- Safi of Persia (reign 1629–1642)
- Abbas II of Persia (reign 1642–1666)
- Suleiman of Persia (reign 1666–1694)

Mohaghegh Sabzevari during the reign of Abbas II of Persia and his prime minister Khalifeh Soltan, was in full honor and respect and was taken care of by them. Shah Abbas II, in order to guarantee the benefits of Mohaghegh Sabzevari, set an amount of fifty tomans as an annual allowance, the original document of which is available in the British Library. The full text of the decree is as follows:

I, King of Land of Abbas
It has been approved that the minister and the accountant of the government of Isfahan, from the first quarter of the coming decade, amount of fifty Tabrizi Tomans annually from the funds and products of the mentioned government, in terms of duty and protection of virtue and perfection of the scholar of the time and aware of the facts, our Lord Mohammad Bagher Sabzevari, pay to him, destined to hand over from year to year from the righteous funds and incomes of the government. He is scheduled to recycle the written salary and not to ask for a new figure every year. Written in 21 May 1658.

== His disciples ==
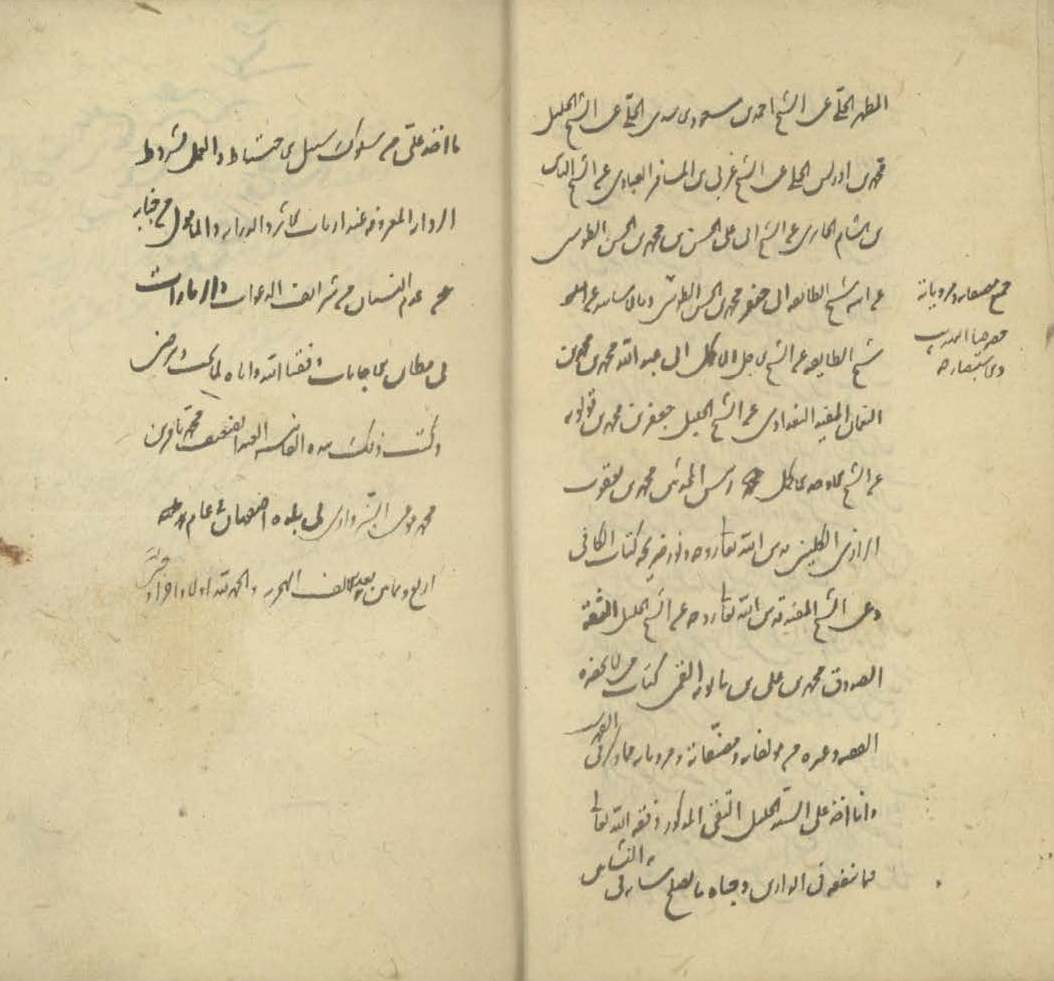
The letter containing a permission to narrate hadiths issued by Mohammad Bagher Sabzevari for Seyyed Mohammad Moghim ibn Mohammad Bagher Isfahani in 1673.

Mohammad Bagher Sabzevari was proficient in most of the Islamic sciences of his time. Hence, many students have participated in his field of study and have used his scientific lectures. Some of his students achieved a high degree of science, some of which are mentioned here:

- Agha Hossein Khansari, known as Mohaghegh Khansari, the sister's husband of Mohammad Bagher Sabzevari.
- Agha Jamal Khansari, is one of the Shiite scholars in the twelfth century AH and the sister's son of Mohammad Bagher Sabzevari, the author of the book "Aqaed al-Nesa wa Mar'at al-Bolaha" (Arabic: عقایدالنساء و مرآت‌البلهاء).
- Mirza Abdollah Esfahani Afandi, the author of the book "Riaz al-Olama va Hiaz al-Fozala" (Arabic: ریاض العلماء و حیاض الفضلاء).
- Seyyed Nematollah Mousavi Jazayeri, one of the great Shiite scholars in the late eleventh and early twelfth century AH, known as Seyyed Jazayeri.
- Jafar ibn Abdollah Hoveizi, known as Sheikh Jafar Qazi, one of the Imami jurists who was Shaykh al-Islām and the judge of Isfahan.
- Mir Abdol Hossein Khatoon Abadi, is one of the famous historians of the Safavid era. His most important book is "Vaqaye al-Senin va al-Aevam" (Arabic: وقایع السنین و الاعوام), which is considered very important in Persian prose. In addition to accurately recording the events, he also briefly introduced the book that he received. He spent most of his time with Mohammad Bagher Sabzevari and in 1670, he received permission from him to narrate hadiths.
- Mullah Mohammad ibn Abd al-Fattah Tonekaboni, known as Sarab; he has authored more than 30 books and treatises, Mohammad Bagher Sabzevari allowed him to narrate hadiths in 1670.
- Mohammad Shafi ibn Faraj Gilani, he was Shaykh al-Islām of Rasht and Shiraz and the book "Al-Bada" (Arabic: البداء) is one of his works. Mohammad Bagher Sabzevari allowed him to narrate hadiths in 1674.
- Seyyed Mohammad Moghim ibn Mohammad Bagher Isfahani, he is the author of several books, including "Towzih al-Oqoud" (Arabic: توضیح العقود). Mohammad Bagher Sabzevari allowed him to narrate hadiths in 1673.
- Mohammad Saleh Biabanaki, Mohammad Bagher Sabzevari allowed him to narrate hadiths in 1664.
- Abdollah Ardabili, Mohammad Bagher Sabzevari allowed him to narrate hadiths.

Seyyed Mosleh al-Din Mahdavi has named 36 students of Mohammad Bagher Sabzevari and has given explanations for each of them.

== In the eyes of others ==
Some of his contemporary jurists and elders have mentioned Mohammad Bagher Sabzevari in their books and praised him for his knowledge, wisdom and comprehensiveness in sciences, which include:

- Al-Hurr al-Amili writes about him: Our lord "Mohammad Bagher ibn Mohammad Mo'men Khorasani Sabzevari", genius scientist, researcher, theologian, sage, jurist and a valuable narrator.
- Mohammad Taher Nasrabadi Esfahani, writes in his book "Tazkereh al-Shoara" (Arabic: تذکره الشعرا) (p. 151): Our lord "Mohammad Bagher" is one of the believer from Sabzevar. The mystic of the teachings of certainty and the discoverer of the sciences of religion, he is the pioneer of the knowledge of the scholars and the leader of all of the virtuous.
- Ali Khamenei, the second and current supreme leader of Iran, in several of speeches, he referred to the high science position of Mohammad Bagher Sabzevari.

== Critics ==
Sheikh Ali Sibt Shahid Dovvom is one of his contemporary scholars and authors. He written a treatise against Mohammad Bagher Sabzevari, which is the subject of his objections and criticisms as follow:

- The subject of the prohibition of Ghina' and considers it detailed: the non-haram and permissible Ghina' - the haram Ghina'. the haram Ghina' restricted to sinful parties and binges.
- Disagreement and fatwa about the limit of the obligation of Friday prayer in one Parasang and less, and the principle of its objective obligation. There is a difference between the Islamic jurists regarding the obligation and prohibition of Friday prayers during the occultation of the Imam and there are three theories in them: 1- Objective existence, 2- Optional existence, 3- Prohibition.
- Knowing the sunset as a camouflage of the sun
- The thick dust is not a fast breaker
- Non-Najis of the People of the Book
- Reflect on the principle of purity of things

== His children ==
- Mohammad Jafar Sabzevari, also known as Mirza Jafar Sabzevari Esfahani is the eldest son of Mohammad Bagher Sabzevari. He is an educated person in Islamic sciences and is the author of several books and treatises, including the "Nowruznameh" (Persian: نوروزنامه), which was written at the request of Sultan Husayn in 1817. Mohammad Jafar Sabzevari was appointed as the Imamate of the Shah Mosque, Isfahan after the death of Mullah Mohammad Saleh. His children are Mohammad Rahim (Shaykh al-Islām of Isfahan), Mohammad Zaki and Roqayyeh Sharif. Mullah Mohammad Zaki, a perfect genius, studied religious sciences in Isfahan and was a scholar of grace and research, but died at a young age (1698), and his tombstone is installed on the wall in the northeastern room of Agha Hossein Khansari Mausoleum in Takht-e Foulad. Mullah Mohammad Jafar Sabzevari fell ill while Isfahan was under siege by the Afghans and the people living in the city were suffering from high prices and famine. He died on October 20, 1722, and because it was not possible to transport his body to Takht-e Foulad or Mashhad (his father's tomb), his body was taken to Hakim Mosque, which was along the alley of his house, and buried in the southern part of the mosque, known as "Barf Andaz".
- Mohammad Hadi Sabzevari, is one of the scholars of Isfahan who apparently studied in the service of his father and Agha Hossein Khansari and Agha Jamal Khansari and probably Mohammad-Baqer Majlesi until he reached high positions. Khatoon Abadi in the book "Vaqaye al-Senin va al-Aevam" (Arabic: وقایع السنین و الاعوام) mentions him as one of the scholars who had gathered in the house of Mirza Mohammad Bagher Sadr Khasseh in 1710 to determine the birthday of Imam Ali. Khatoon Abadi also mentions him as one of the scholars who attended at the inauguration ceremony of Chahar Bagh school on 4 September 1710. Seyyed Abdollah Jazayeri has mentioned him as one of his famous contemporary scholars. His wife was one of the daughters of the Safavid family, from whose family a number of endowments are left to the children, among whom is still divided (1925). His children are Sheikh Mirza Abed and Sheikh Mirza Mohsen. They died during their father's lifetime (before 1679) and their burial place is unknown.
- Mohammad Mahdi Sabzevari, no information is available about his life and works. He is the father of Agha Mohammad al-Soltani, who wrote the book "Tarjumat al-Sultani" (Arabic: ترجمة السلطانی). No information is available on the date of his death or burial.
- Mohammad Ebrahim Sabzevari, apparently he was younger than his brothers and did not have much fame and title in the eyes of scientific authorities. His children are Mirza Mohammad Bagher and Ashraf who for some reason during the Safavid period (late reign of Shah Suleiman or early reign of Shah Sultan Hussein around 1692) were exiled/migrated to the village of Qehi and inhabited in the castle of Atashgah in the western side of the village. The castle built by Mirza Mohammad Bagher and Ashraf is more than 300 years old and is one of the prominent buildings of the village with an area of about 6500 square meters and has 7 houses. These 7 houses are surrounded by a high wall and 7 brick towers with 7 meters high. Seven generations of the descendants of these two brothers have lived in this castle, hence they are known as the castle family (Ghal'eh Eeha). Later, they changed their surnames to Ashrafi, Bagheri and Bagheri Mohagheghi. One of the descendants of Mohammad Ebrahim Sabzevari is Haj Mirza Bagher Qehi known as Muhammad Baqir Sharif Tabatabae who was one of the Sheikhs and scholar of the Shaykhism sect. No information is available on the date of his death or burial.
- Sabzevari's daughter, she was the wife of Seyyed Mohammad Mousavi Jabei Ameli, who died during his father's lifetime in Isfahan with his two young children in 1678 because of plague.

== The position of Shaykh al-Islam ==
After the death of Mohammad Bagher Sabzevari, for more than 50 years, a number of clerics were appointed as Shaykh al-Islām of Isfahan (kind of religious leader). At the beginning of Nader Shah's rule and his coming to power, two spiritual positions, namely Imam of Congregational Prayer and Shaykh al-Islam, were in the monopoly of the descendants of Mohammad-Baqer Majlesi. Some advisers told Nader Shah that the two positions, which have power, influence and importance among the masses, should not be concentrated in one place where they can oppose the government whenever they want. Because Nader Shah was thinking of gaining absolute power, and had previously opposed the rise of Shiite Ulama to power, and had killed some of them under the some pretexts, he decided to separate and appoint two men to lead the congregation and Shaykh al-Islam. Nader Shah, knowing the records of Mirza Mohammad Rahim Sabzevari, who was one of the scholars who agreed with him and favored him, consulted with him, and he replied that "the position of Imam of Friday Prayer was in the family of Mohammad-Baqer Majlesi and our ancestor Mohaghegh Sabzevari has already been Shaykh al-Islam". Nader Shah accepted this statement and appointed Mirza Mohammad Rahim as the judge of Isfahan and then Shaykh al-Islam of this city. After that, the position of Shaykh al-Islam in Isfahan remained in the monopoly of the descendants of Mohammad Bagher Sabzevari, which included:

- Mirza Mohammad Rahim (died 1767), the son of Mohammad Jafar Sabzevari son of Mohammad Bagher Sabzevari. He was one of the great scholars and clerics who was highly esteemed by the rulers and elders of the government and Nader Shah. Nader Shah appointed him as the judge and then Shaykh al-Islam of Isfahan in 1741. Mirza Mohammad Rahim Sabzevari held this position until his death during the reign of Karim Khan Zand.
- Mirza Morteza Shaykh al-Islam (died 1811), the son of Mirza Abdol Mottalleb son of Mirza Mohammad Rahim Sabzevari. He was a genius researchist and one of the famous scholars of Isfahan. Mirza Morteza's father (Mirza Abdol Mottalleb Sabzevari) died in 1747 during the life of his grandfather. His uncle (Mirza Abdollah Sabzevari) died in 1762 during the life of his grandfather too. Therefore, after the death of his grandfather (Mirza Mohammad Rahim) in 1767, Mirza Morteza became the Shaykh al-Islam of Isfahan during the reign of Karim Khan Zand.
- Mirza Mohammad Rahim II (died 1833) was one of the scholars of Isfahan. Among his students, can be mentioned Mohammad Bagher Sharif Isfahani son of Mohammad Taghi Sharif Razavi Qomi, the author of "Noor Al-Oyoun" (Arabic: نورالعیون). Mirza Mohammad Rahim II reached the position of Shaykh al-Islam after the death of his father (Mirza Morteza) in 1811 during the reign of Fath-Ali Shah Qajar.
- Mirza Abdollah Shaykh al-Islam (died after 1871) was one of the great and influential scholars of Isfahan. In the revolt of the people of Isfahan against Khosrow Khan Gorji, the tyrant of Isfahan, he went to Mohammad Shah Qajar in Tehran to complain about the ruler and support the people, and he was respected and honored. A decree was issued on behalf of the king, in which he ordered Khosrow Khan Gorji to carry out the orders of Shaykh al-Islam Mirza Abdollah. Mirza Abdollah became the Shaykh al-Islam after the death of his father (Mirza Mohammad Rahim II) in 1833.
- Mirza Mohammad Rahim III (died 1889) was one of the famous and influential scholars of Isfahan and gained knowledge in this city from the service of prominent scholars and mujtahids. Among his professors, can be mentioned Haj Mohammad Jafar Abadeh Ee, Mullah Hossein Ali Tuyserkani, Agha Seyyed Mohammad Shahshahani and Sheikh Mohammad Bagher Masjed Shahi. Mirza Mohammad Rahim III after the death of his father (Mirza Abdollah II) and after the year 1871, during the reign of Naser al-Din Shah Qajar and the governor of Mass'oud Mirza Zell-e Soltan, reached the position of Shaykh al-Islam.
- Haj Mirza Mohammad Hassan (died 1892), in the service of the great scholars of Isfahan, such as Haj Sheikh Mohammad Taghi Masjed Shahi and others, he used to reach high positions of knowledge, grace and perfection. After the death of his father (son of Mirza Rahim III) in 1888, during the reign of Naser al-Din Shah Qajar and the governor of Mass'oud Mirza Zell-e Soltan in Isfahan, he became Shaykh al-Islam.
- Haj Mirza Ali Akbar Shaykh al-Islam (1867-1931) was a political and social activist during the constitutional movement in Isfahan. He held various positions, including the mayor of Isfahan and the representative of Isfahan in the fourth term of the National Assembly. Mirza Ali Akbar After the death of his brother (Mirza Mohammad Hassan) in 1892, became the Shaykh al-Islam in Isfahan.

== His grandchildren ==
- Mirza Abdol Rahim: also known as Mohammad Rahim, he was one of the Shaykh al-Islāms of Isfahan.
- Mohammad Reza ibn Mohammad Mahdi Sabzevari: also known as Agha Mohammad al-Soltani, from the nobility of the early twelfth century AH.
- Muhammad Baqir Sharif Tabatabae: also known as Haj Mirza Bagher Qehi, one of the Sheikhs and scholar of the Shaykhism sect.
- Zayn ol-Abedin Shahshahani: a genius and proficient in Quranic studies and one of the masters of the art of Qiraʼat and Tajwid.
- Mirza Yahya Modarres Esfahani: scholar, writer, mystic and professor of religious literature and owner of a poetry collection with about six thousand verses including eulogy, literature and religious poems in the late of Qajar period.
- Agha Hassan Sabzevari: a physician and sage scientist in the early thirteenth century AH and one of the prominent students of the sage Hadi Sabzavari.
- Ali Sheikholeslam: founder and first president of the National University of Iran.
- Hossein Sheikholeslam: the representative of the constituencies of Tehran, Ray, Shemiranat and Eslamshahr in the seventh term of the Islamic Consultative Assembly and also the former ambassador of Iran to Syria.
- Zahra Karinshak: daughter of Mahdi Sheikholeslam, lawyer and politician, democratic senator of the State of Georgia.

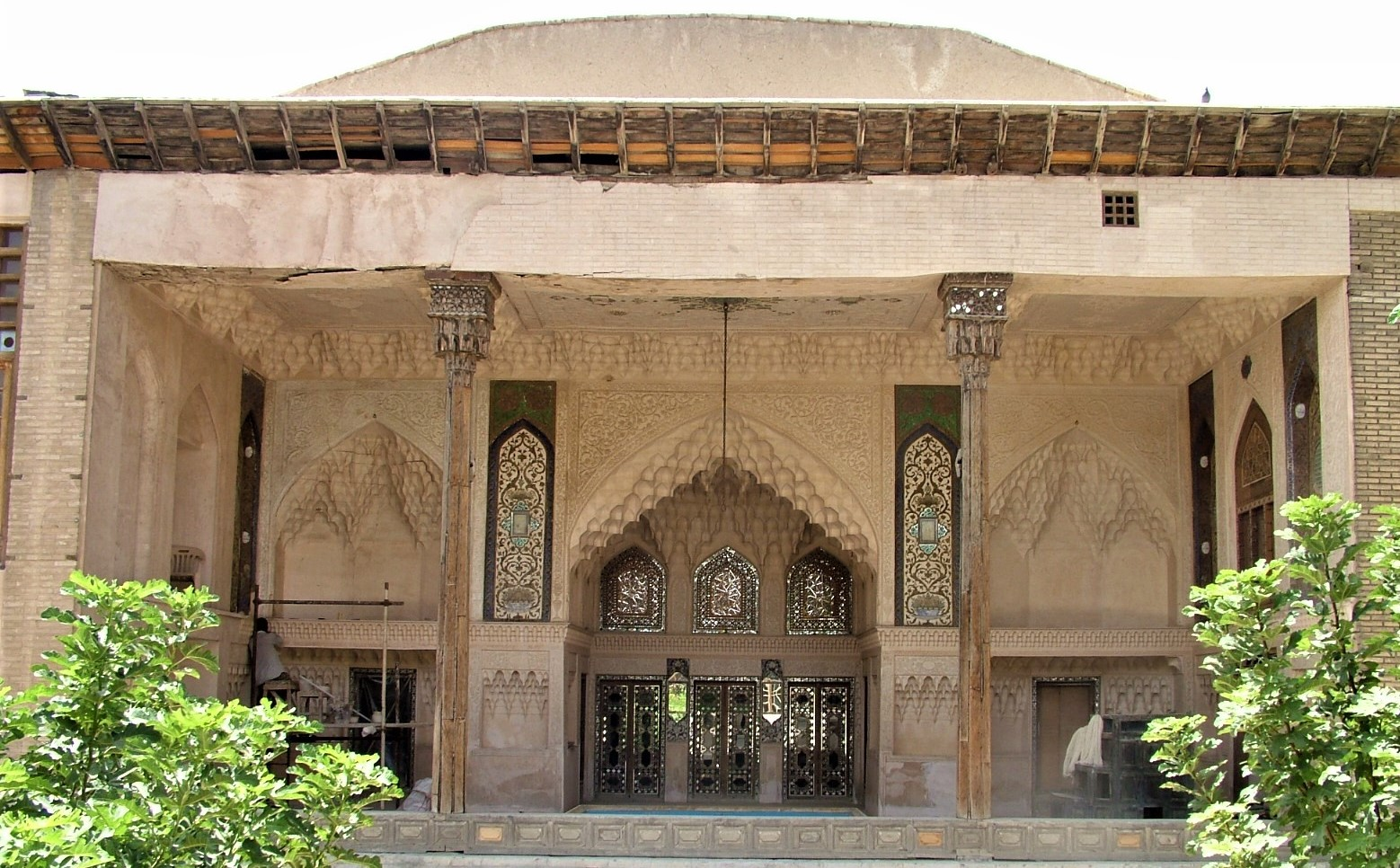
Residence of Mohammad Bagher Sabzevari (Sheykh ol-Eslam's House in Isfahan).

== Sheykh ol-Eslam's House ==
The residence of Mohammad Bagher Sabzevari is known as the court or house of Shaykh al-Islam. During the reign of Shah Suleiman of the Safavid dynasty (and probably Shah Abbas II), Allamah Mohsen Fayz Kashani asked Mullah Mohammad Bagher Sabzevari to live in Isfahan and take the position of Shaykh al-Islām of this city. In the "Seeneh Payeeni" neighborhood near "Homayoun Garden (Bab Homayoun)", there was a royal garden that the Shah entrusted to Mohammad Bagher Sabzevari and ordered the construction of a magnificent mansion in the style of Chehel Sotoun. This building was the residence of Mohammad Bagher Sabzevari and his wife Sarv Ghad Khanom (one of the daughters of the Safavid court) and the court part of the main building became the center of justice and the religious rule of the country, especially the capital affairs. Six generations of Mohammad Bagher Sabzevari descendants, held the position of Shaykh al-Islām of Isfahan and the last of them was Haj Mirza Ali Akbar Shaykh al-Islam who lived in this house.

== Endowments ==
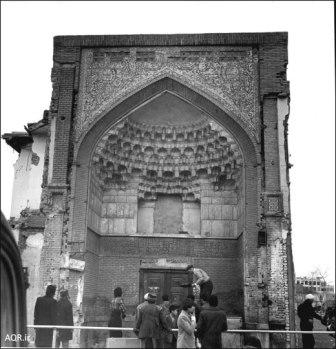
Bagherieh School (or Sameeieh School) in Mashhad, teaching place of Mohammad Bagher Sabzevari (1672).

Mohammad Bagher Sabzevari, after the repairs of Bagherieh School in Mashhad in 1672, determined endowments to continue the work of the school, which included two plots of land with two guest houses, the buildings of which were leased to individuals with a lease agreement to be given to the school free of charge after 15 years, and two houses that were later rented as inns and 27 shops around the school. Endowment income according to the endowment contract after deduction of repair costs is used as follows: 0.1 as a fee and 0.3 for charity (mourning and feeding the poor of the Twelver community, at the discretion of the trustee) and 0.6 for lighting and cleaning and salaries of clergies and servants.

James Baillie Fraser, a Scottish travel writer, who came to Iran around 1825, mentions this school as an organized school with eighty to ninety students.

Nowruz Ali Fazel Bastami, the author of "Ferdows al-Tawarikh" (Arabic: فردوس‌التواریخ) in 1884, considers this school unique in the eyes of teachers, agents and students who are engaged in teaching and learning day and night.

After the incident of Kashf-e hijab in Iran (1936) and the emergence of difficulties for the clergies, The Endowment Office entrusted the school to The Culture Department so that students could study there. But after the ouster of Reza Shah (September 16, 1941) by the efforts of Ayatollah Mirza Ahmad Kafaei, the school was once again handed over to the students of religious sciences. At that time, the school was headed by Haj Mirza Abdollah Shaykh al-Islam, a descendant of Mohaghegh Sabzevari who lived in Isfahan, and a person named Mozaffari, a retired cultural worker, as his representative took care of the school. The Endowment Office began to reconstruction the school in 1967, and in 1971, reopened it by preserving the first form with 34 chamber, a teaching hall, a library including a repository and a reading room, four rooms for office affairs and security, and a pantry. The school library at that time had four hundred manuscripts and 580 volumes of printed books. In 1975, due to the development plan around the Imam Reza Shrine, the school was completely destroyed, and all its endowments became part of the green space around the shrine.

== Demise ==
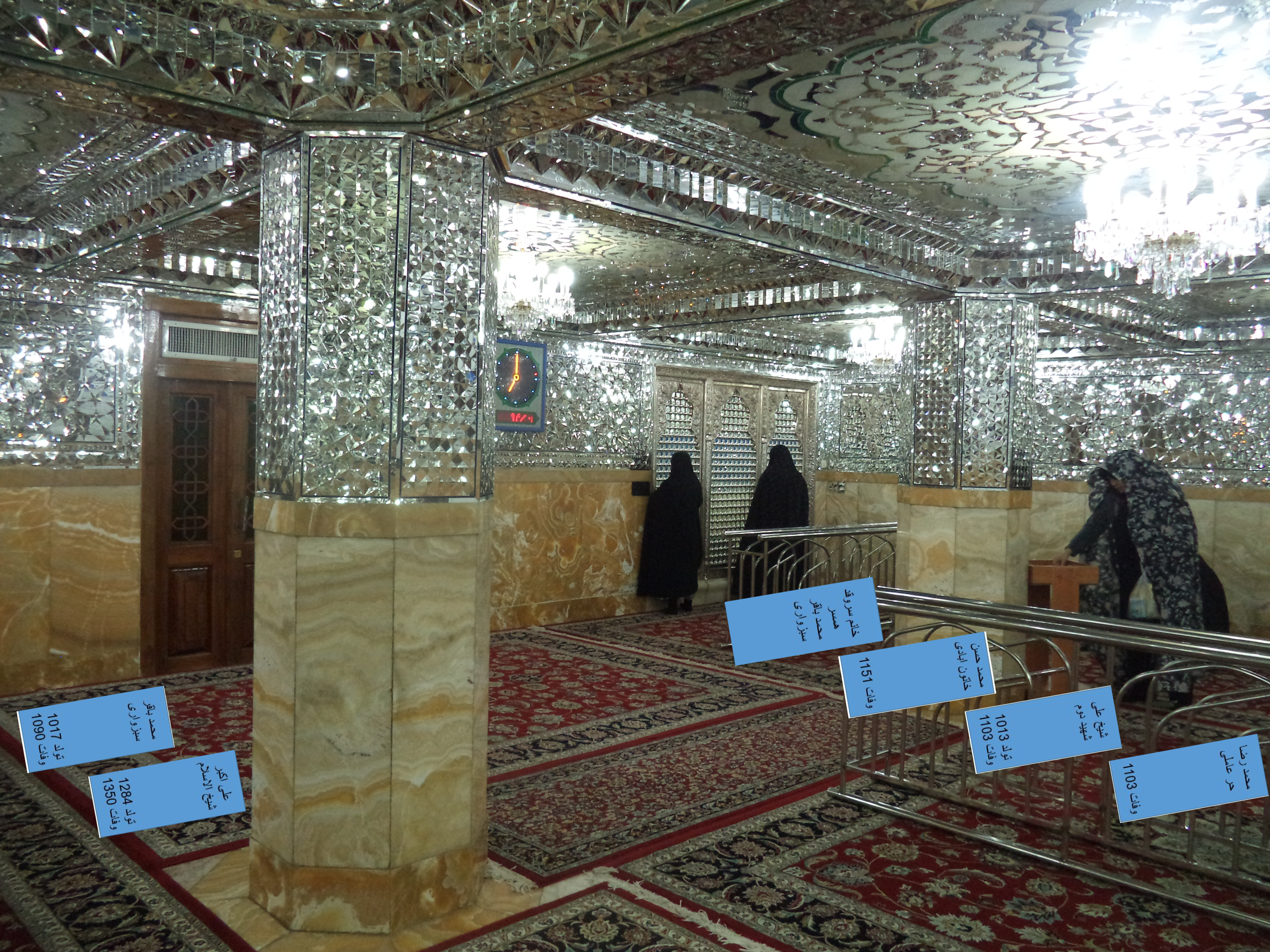
Mashhad, Imam Reza Shrine, tomb of Al-Hurr al-Amili, the old place of the basement of Mirza Jafar School, grave of Mohammad Bagher Sabzevari.

Allamah Mohammad Bagher Sabzevari died at the age of 71 on 19 April 1679 in Isfahan. His body was transferred from Isfahan to the city of Mashhad, where he was buried in the basement of Mirza Jafar School. In addition to Mohammad Bagher Sabzevari, his wife (Sarv Ghad Khanom) and his descendants Haj Mirza Mohammad Hassan Shaykh al-Islam and Haj Mirza Ali Akbar Shaykh al-Islam and several other scholars are buried in the basement of Mirza Jafar School (tomb of Al-Hurr al-Amili), that after the plan to develop the Imam Reza Shrine, their gravestones were moved and no longer exist in this place.

== See also ==
- Mohammad Ibrahim Kalbasi
- Mirza-ye Qomi
- Zakaria ibn Idris Ash'ari Qomi
- Seyyed Mohammad Hojjat Kooh Kamari
- Ahmad ibn Ishaq Ash'ari Qomi
- Zakaria ibn Adam Ash'ari Qomi
- Agha Hossein Khansari
