= Mirza Zahira Tafreshi =

Iranian theologian and poet (died before 1702 AD)

Mirza Zahira Tafreshi (Persian: میرزا ظهیرا تفرشی; died before 1702) was an Iranian theologian and poet, who was active during the reigns of the Safavid rulers Shah Abbas II (r. 1642–1666), Shah Soleyman (r. 1666–1694), and Shah Soltan Hoseyn (r. 1694–1722).

== Personal life ==
He was born in the town of Tafresh (south-east of Tehran), and was the son of the prominent scholar Molla Morad Tafreshi (died 1641/2). Tafreshi was educated in the capital of Isfahan under the tutelage of the distinguished philosopher Agha Hossein Khansari (died 1687). During the reign of Shah Abbas II, Tafreshi was selected as the prayer leader of the northwestern province of Georgia. He was sent to the province along with its newly appointed Wāli (governor) Archil II (Shah Nazar Khan) (r. 1664–1675). During his stay in Georgia, Tafreshi engaged in various interreligious discussions with Roman Catholic and Melkite leaders.

== career ==
Tafreshi could speak Persian, Arabic and Azeri Turkish, the latter which was likely his native language. He reportedly spoke Azeri Turkish in some of his interreligious discussions with his Georgian challengers, in which Shah Nazar Khan served as a translator. Tafreshi composed his works in Arabic and Persian, in which he focused on poetry and prose, the interpretation of the Quran, Islamic legal theory, rational theology, philosophy and various discourses on astronomy.

== Death ==
The death date of Tafreshi is uncertain; the latest record of him is in the colophon of a copy of his Matali u magharib, composed in 1702.

== Sources ==
- Alsulami, Mohammed (2018). "Mīrzā Ẓahīrā Tafrishī". Christian-Muslim Relations. A Bibliographical History. Volume 12 Asia, Africa and the Americas (1700-1800). Brill.
