= Mohammad Jafar Sabzevari =

Iranian scholar from the twelfth century AH

Mullah Mohammad Jafar Sabzevari
- ملا محمدجعفر سبزواری

Personal life
- Born: Mohammad Jafar ibn Mohammad Bagher Sharif Sabzevari; Persian: محمد جعفر بن محمد باقر شریف سبزواری; Isfahan, Iran
- Died: 1722 Isfahan, Iran
- Resting place: Hakim Mosque, Isfahan; 32.662973°N 51.674271°E
- Spouse: Kheir ol-Nesa Khanom bint Agha Alinaghi
- Children: Mohammad Rahim Sabzevari; Mohammad Zaki Sabzevari; Roqayyeh Sharif Sabzevari
- Parent: Mohammad Bagher Sabzevari (Mohaghegh Sabzevari) (father)
- Other names: Mirza Jafar Sabzevari Esfahani; Persian: میرزا جعفر سبزواری اصفهانی

Religious life
- Religion: Islam
- School: Shia
- Sect: Twelver

Mullah Mohammad Jafar Sabzevari (Persian: ملا محمدجعفر سبزواری) (died October 20, 1722) was one of the Iranian scholars and clerics of the 12th century AH, the Imam of Friday Prayer of the Shah Mosque in Isfahan and the author of several books and treatises including "Nowruznameh" and "Ma'ad" which was compiled at the request of Shah Sultan Hussein Safavid.

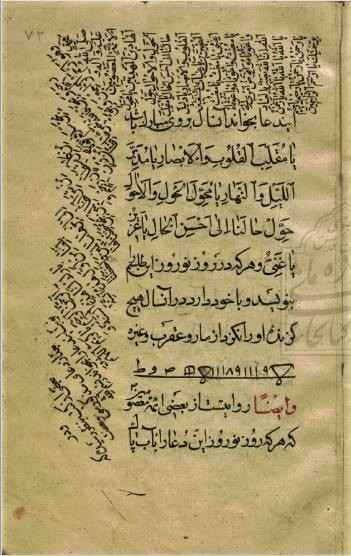
"Nowruznameh" manuscript by Mullah Mohammad Jafar Sabzevari, Date of writing 1817.

== Life and lineage ==
Mullah Mohammad Jafar Sabzevari was born in Isfahan and is the eldest son of Mohammad Bagher Sabzevari (known as Mohaghegh Sabzevari) (1608-1679) and his lineage is as follows: Mohammad Jafar ibn Akhund Mullah Mohammad Bagher ibn Mohammad Moemen al-Sharif al-Sabzevari. He was an educated person in Islamic sciences. He was one of the students of his father, Mohaghegh Sabzevari, Mohaghegh Khansari and Mohammad-Baqer Majlesi and has taught Islamic sciences in Isfahan for many years.

His wife was Kheir ol-Nesa Khanom bint Agha Alinaghi: She died on the first of October 23, 1730, and is buried next to her husband's grave in the southern part of Hakim Mosque, Isfahan. His eldest son Mirza Mohammad Rahim was the Shaykh al-Islām (kind of religious leader) of Isfahan from 1738 to 1767. He died on 9 May 1768. His other son Mullah Mohammad Zaki was a genius and researcher who studied religious sciences in Isfahan, but died at a young age (1698), and his tombstone is installed on the wall in the north eastern room of Agha Hossein Khansari Mausoleum in Takht-e Foulad. Mullah Mohammad Jafar Sabzevari also had a daughter Roqayyeh Sharif who was a charitable woman. She dedicated several properties located in the farms of Kheyrabad, Yangabad and Qasem Abad of Jarghooyeh County of Isfahan and their belongings to serve the Muslim pilgrims in 1749. She was very active in holding religious ceremonies.

== Works ==
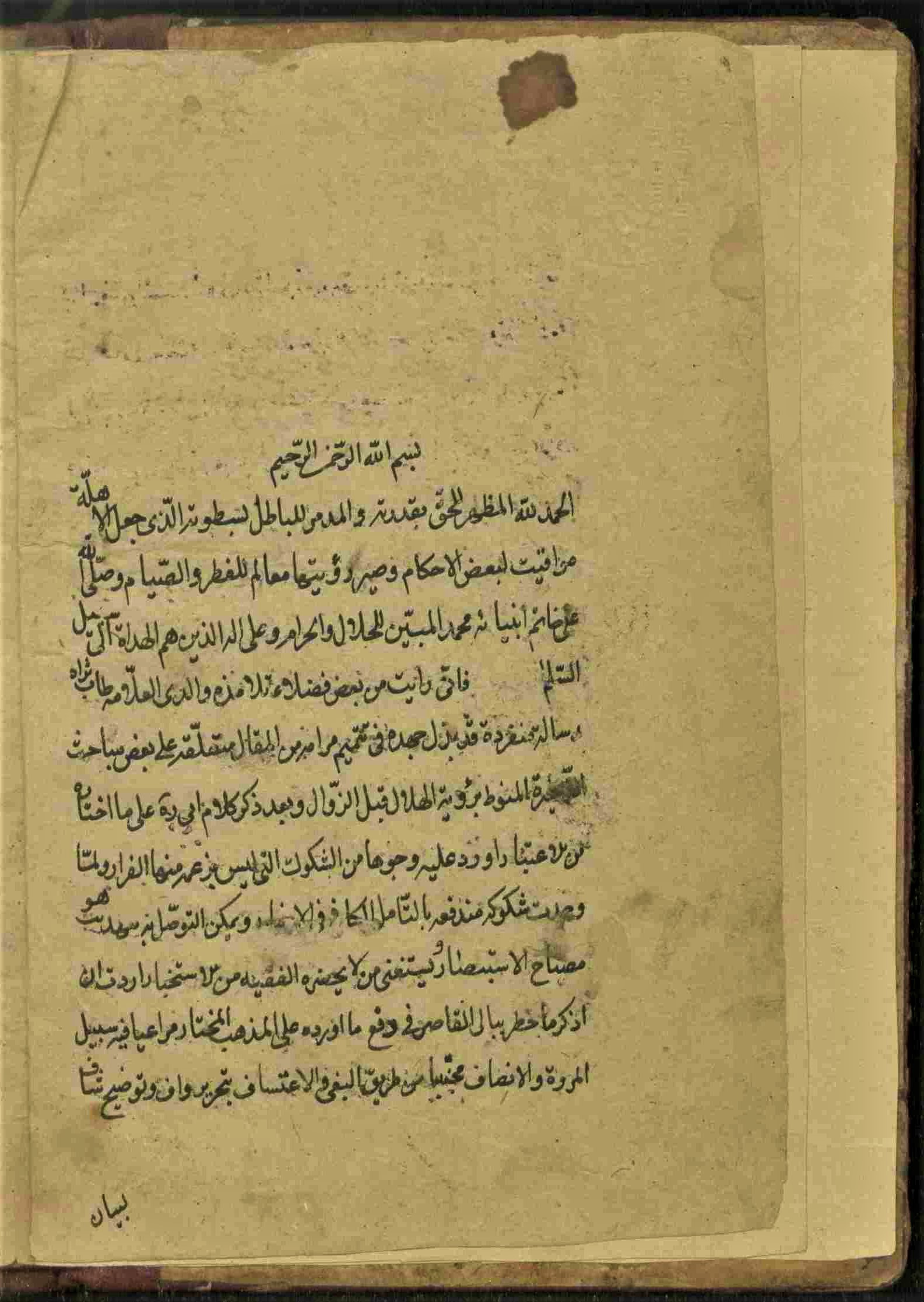
A manuscript by Mullah Mohammad Jafar Sabzevari on "The validity of seeing the crescent before the demise".

He has authored several books and treatises, including the following:

- Al-Votaireh (Arabic: الوتیرة, English meaning: About Al-Wutayra Prayer): In this treatise, he proves that sitting in Al-Wutayra prayer is better than standing. The copy is available in collection number 474 in the Mar'ashi Najafi Library in Qom, 1710
- Al-Takbirat al-Sab'e (Arabic: التکبیرات السبع, English meaning: The seven Takbirs), 1710
- Roat al-Helal Qabl az Zoval (Arabic: روئت الهلال قبل از زوال, English meaning: Seeing the crescent before the demise): Copy No. 1866 is available in the Central Library of University of Tehran, 1710
- Sharh Al-Fieh (Arabic: شرح الفیه, English meaning: Explanation of the book "Al-Fieh" by Muhammad Jamaluddin al-Makki al-Amili): A copy of it in Persian dated 1715 is available in the Central Library of Astan Quds Razavi with number 9936, 1715
- Resaleh dar Ma'ad (Persian: رساله در معاد به درخواست شاه سلطان حسین صفوی, English meaning: Treatise on the Resurrection at the request of Shah Sultan Hussein Safavid): It includes the explanation of the interpretation of the last verses of Surah Az-Zumar in three chapters.
- Nowruznameh (Persian: نوروزنامه به درخواست شاه سلطان حسین صفوی, English meaning: Treatise of Nowruz at the request of Shah Sultan Hussein Safavid): It includes: Introduction, three chapters and a conclusion, and it contains a complete description of the various prayers and foods recommended for Nowruz, 1817
- Resaleh dar Taeyine Rouze Eyde Nowruz (Persian: رساله در تعیین روز عید نوروز, English meaning: Treatise on determining the day of Nowruz)

He also wrote and compiled some of the religious and scientific books of his time in a beautiful calligraphy method called Naskh, including a copy of the book "Reality of Certainty" by Mohammad-Baqer Majlesi which is available with No. 1942 in the Mar'ashi Najafi Library.

== Positions and events ==
- Mullah Mohammad Jafar Sabzevari was appointed as the Salah al jama'ah 's Imamate of Hakim Mosque and after the death of Mullah Mohammad Saleh Ibn Reza Qoli in 1685 he was appointed as the Imamate of the new Abbasi Grand Mosque (Shah Mosque).
- Mullah Mohammad Jafar and his brother Mullah Mohammad Hadi were among the scholars who, at the invitation of Shah Sultan Hussein Safavid, participated in a scientific assembly held on 5 September 1710 to determine the birthday of Ali ibn Abi Talib. These two brothers expressed their opinion based on the sources and documents they had. At the end of the assembly, the opinion of most scholars and scientists was the 13th of Rajab, and the Shah declared this day as the official birthday of Ali ibn Abi Talib and Eid.
- Mullah Mohammad Jafar and his brother Mullah Mohammad Hadi also attended at the inauguration ceremony of Chahar Bagh school on 4 September 1710, which is one of the most glorious gatherings and meetings in the Safavid government and by the order of Shah Sultan Hussein Safavid and the invitation of the rulers, the lords, ulama, teachers and all the elders of the country were held.

== His masters ==
During his studies, Mullah Mohammad Jafar Sabzevari has benefited from famous masters, including:

- Mohammad Bagher Sabzevari (his father)
- Mohaghegh Khansari
- Mohammad-Baqer Majlesi
- Mirza Rafi'a Naeeni
- Mir Seyyed Esmaeel Khatoon Abadi

== His disciples ==
Mullah Mohammad Jafar Sabzevari also taught outstanding disciples, including:

- Mohammad Ja'far ibn Mohammad Shafi'ee Naeeni: He was one of the scholars of the twelfth century AH. He was apparently one of the students of Mullah Mohammad Jafar Sabzevari. He wrote in handwriting the books "Al-Votaireh", "Roat al-Helal Qabl az Zoval" and "Al-Takbirat al-Sab'e" authored by Mullah Mohammad Jafar Sabzevari in September 1710, which is available in the Mar'ashi Najafi Library with number 478.

== In the eyes of others ==
Hazin Lahiji says about him in his history and travelogue book: Mullah Mohammad Jafar Sabzevari was a genius, who was a famous follower and ascetic.

== Demise ==
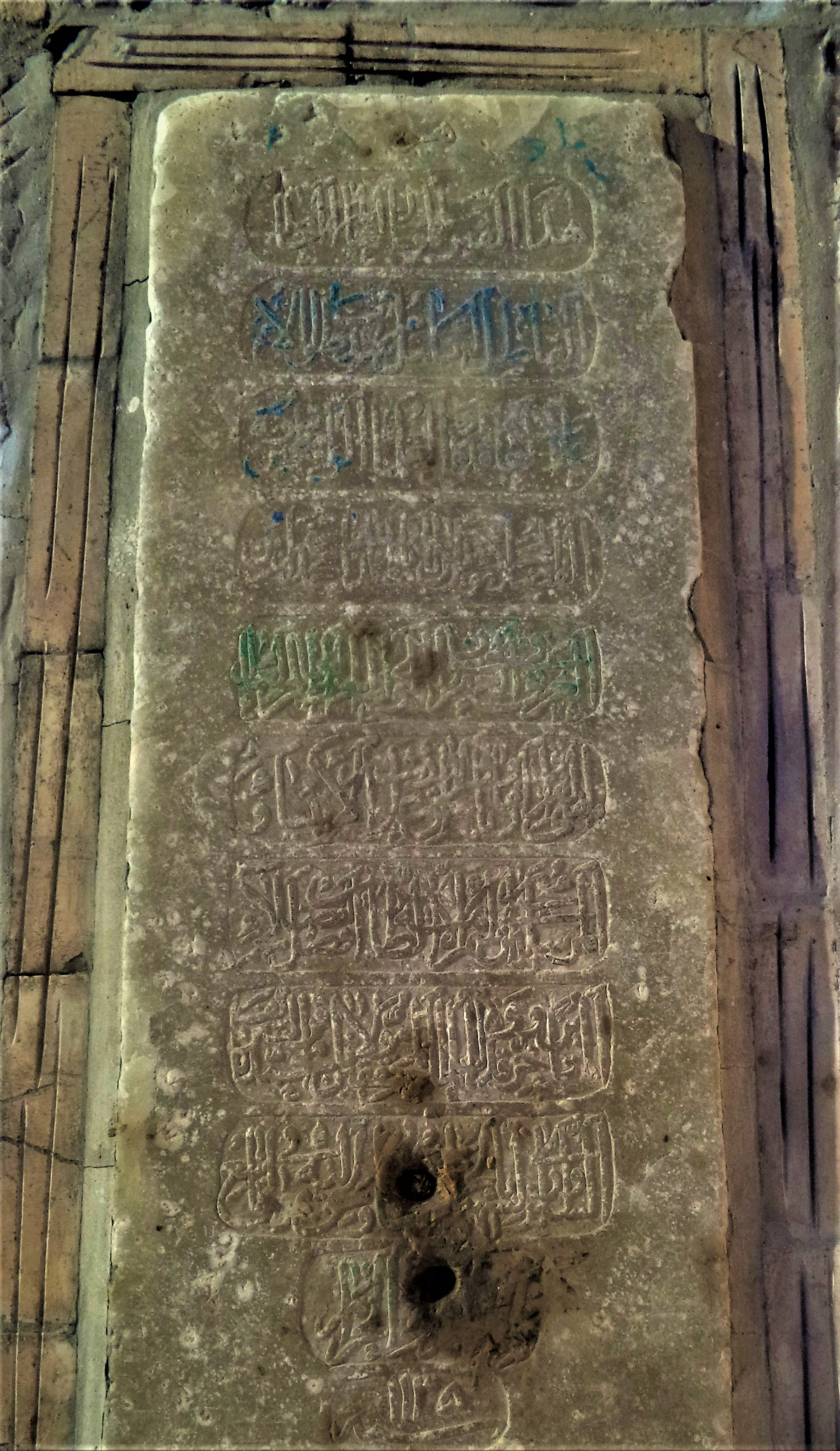
Gravestone of Mullah Mohammad Jafar Sabzevari

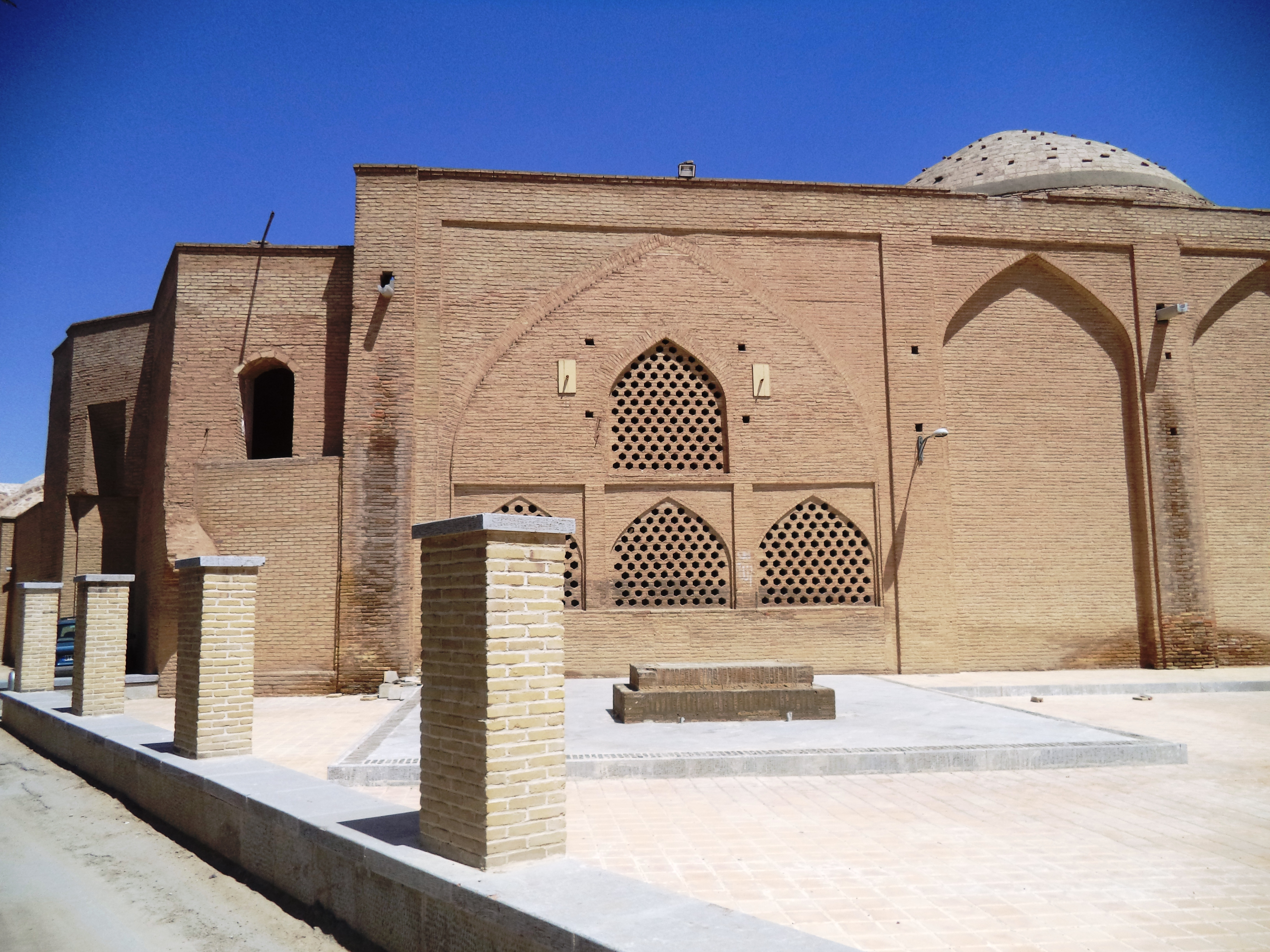
Gravesite of Mullah Mohammad Jafar Sabzevari

Mullah Mohammad Jafar Sabzevari fell ill while Isfahan was under siege by the Afghans and the people living in the city were suffering from high prices and famine. He died on October 20, 1722, and because it was not possible to transport his body to Takht-e Foulad or Mashhad (his father's tomb), his body was taken to Hakim Mosque, which was along the alley of his house, and buried in the southern part of the mosque, known as "Barf Andaz". His mausoleum was out of reach of the public for years, even several centuries, until in recent years, with the construction of Hakim Street, this tomb and mausoleum were located next to the street. This area has been renovated and has become a place of pilgrimage.

== See also ==
- Mohammad Ibrahim Kalbasi
- Mirza-ye Qomi
- Zakaria ibn Idris Ash'ari Qomi
- Seyyed Mohammad Hojjat Kooh Kamari
- Ahmad ibn Ishaq Ash'ari Qomi
- Zakaria ibn Adam Ash'ari Qomi
- Agha Hossein Khansari
