= Mirza-ye Qomi =

Biography of a "Shiite jurist" from "Fath-Ali Shah Qajar" era

Mirza-ye Qomi; Mirza Abolghasem Gilani
- میرزا ابوالقاسم گیلانی; میرزا ابوالقاسم بن محمدحسن شفتی قمی; میرزای قمی
- Born: 1739; Japelaq District, Qajar Iran
- Died: 1815 (aged 75–76)
- Burial place: Sheikhan cemetery
- Other name: Abu al-Qasim Qomi
- Occupations: Faqīh, mujtahid, Marja'
- Known for: Qawanin al-Usul

Mirza Abolghasem Gilani (Persian: میرزا ابوالقاسم گیلانی), known as Mirza-ye Qomi (Persian: میرزای قمی), the author of the book of Qawanin al-Usul (Arabic: قوانین الاصول, means: The Laws of Principles), was a Shiite jurist (Faqīh), mujtahid, fundamentalist (Usuli) and a religious reference (Marja') during the reign of Fath Ali Shah Qajar in the twelfth century AH. Mirza-ye Qomi was active and famous in poetry and calligraphy. He has left more than fifty thousand verses of poetry in Persian and Arabic, as well as writings in Naskh and Nastaliq scripts.

== Birth ==
Mirza Abolghasem Gilani, known as Mirza-ye Qomi, was born in 1739 CE in Japelaq District, Azna County, Lorestan Province, Iran. He grew up in Japelaq. He was also known as Mirza-ye Qomi because of his residence in Qom.

Mirza Abolghasem Gilani, the son of Mullah Mohsen (Mohammad Hassan), was originally from Shaft, Gilan Province. His father went from Shaft to Japelaq, where he married and Mirza Abolghasem was born in the middle of the twelfth century in 1151 AH (1739 CE). Mirza's father, Hassan ibn Nazar Ali Keikhi Rashti, was himself a virtuous man and wrote the book "Kas al-Sa'ilin" (Arabic: کأس السائلين, means: Askers' Cup) in the style of Kashkul. Mirza's mother was also the daughter of his father's teacher Mirza Hedayatullah and was from a family of knowledge and virtue.

== Education and career ==
He learned the basics of Islamic education from his father. Later, he went to Khansar to continue his education and benefited from Seyyed Hossein Khansari, son of Seyyed Abolghasem Khansari (Mirkabir) and married his teacher's sister (Seyyed Hossein Khansari) in the same city. Finally, to complete his education in 1174 AH (1761 CE), he left for Iraq and benefited from the presence of Muhammad Baqir Behbahani and received permission from him for Ijtihad and "Transmission of Hadiths". After years of studying in the Karbala seminary, Mirza-ye Qomi returned to his hometown and spent some time preaching and teaching in those areas.

Mirza-ye Qomi had been preaching and teaching in his hometowns for some time, but because he did not find much knowledge and education seeker there, he migrated to Qom, where he soon became the head of the Shiite authority. In this way, he started teaching, composing poetry, propagating and promoting Islam there.

After that, he wrote and composed Tasnifs, taught and issued Fatwas, and propagated the Islam religion, and chose the city's Congregational mosque to hold Jumu'ah and Salah al jama'ah prayers. As a result of his actions, the seminary of Qom overshadowed the seminary of Isfahan - which at that time was an active and lively seminary with great Shiite teachers - and attracted the attention of Muslims. It was during this time that Fath Ali Shah Qajar, during his first trip to Qom, realized the moral virtues and carnal perfections and levels of Mirza-ye Qomi, and to visit him, Fath Ali Shah Qajar came to the Congregational mosque of the city and followed Mirza-ye Qomi in the Zuhr prayer and Asr prayer of that day.

== His masters ==
Mirza-ye Qomi has benefited from the presence of many masters.

1. His first teacher was his noble father Mullah Mohammad Hossein Gilani.
2. Agha Hossein Khansari

But his most important masters, who used their presence in the holy cities of Shiite such as Karbala and received "permission for ijtihad" from them. These include:

1. Muhammad Baqir Behbahani: who was considered one of the most important fundamentalists against the Akhbari movement due to his scientific prominence, especially in the science of Principles of Islamic jurisprudence. Mirza-ye Qomi benefited a lot from this master.
2. Mohammad Bagher Hezar Jeribi
3. Mohammad Mahdi Fotouni Kabir

== His disciples ==
One of the most well known activities was the training of students, each of whom was a pioneer in the Islamic science and jurisprudence, the most prominent of whom are the following people:

1. Mohammad Bagher Shafti, the author of the book Matale Al-Anwar (Arabic: مطالع الانوار).
2. Mohammad Ibrahim Kalbasi, a proud and eminent scholar of Jaʽfari jurisprudence.
3. Mohammad Ali Hezar Jeribi, who had special skills in Islamic intellectual and narrative sciences and is the author of various works in Tafsir, Rijal and Kalam.
4. Mohammad Mahdi Khorasani, who obtained most of his scientific degrees in the presence of Mirza-ye Qomi, and Mirza-ye Qomi was also very interested in him. He also had a special skill in the science of rijal and recognizing Hadith narrators.
5. Mirza Abu Taleb Qomi, who was highly trusted by Mirza-ye Qomi, so that he referred many religious matters to him.
6. Seyyed Abdollah Kazemeini
7. Seyyed Mahdi Mousavi Khansari
8. Seyyed Mohammad Javad Ameli, the author of the book Metah al-Keramah (Arabic: مفتاح الکرامة)
9. Seyyed Ali Khansari
10. Sheikh Jafar Shooshtari
11. Mirza Alireza Qomi
12. Seyyed Ismail Qomi
13. Agha Ahmad Kermanshahi
14. Asadullah Boroujerdi
15. Seyyed Mohsen Aeroji
16. Mullah Qolamreza Arani

== Works ==
In most Islamic sciences, such as jurisprudence, principles, theology, meanings and expressions, hadith, history, rijal, philosophy, ethics, civil politics and state customs, Mirza-ye Qomi has left valuable and unprecedented compositions and writings, each of which expresses intellectual genius and the scientific taste of him. Most of his scientific works created during his stay in Qom, but the beginning of his writing and composition activity dates back to his youth when he was studying in the seminary of Khansar under master Agha Hossein Khansari. The writings and compositions of this eminent mujtahid are as follows:

1. Qawanin al-Usul (Arabic: قوانين الاصول, title means: Laws of Principles): This book is the most important and famous work of Mirza-ye Qomi which was written in Arabic in 1205 AH (1791 CE) and has been one of the most important textbooks of seminaries in the science of Principles of Islamic jurisprudence for more than forty years. Mirza-ye Qomi is known among the Islam scholars as the "owner of the Laws" because of this valuable work.
2. Jameh al-Shatat (Arabic: جامع الشتات or Arabic: السؤال و الجواب or Arabic: اجوبة المسائل): The original name of this book is "Questions and Answers" or "Answers to Matters". The work contains a period of Islamic jurisprudence in subjects of Ritual purity to Diyat, which has been stated in response to various questions. This treatise shows the complete encirclement of Mirza-ye Qomi on the details of ijtihad in Principles of Islamic jurisprudence and has been considered by Islamic jurists for a long time since its compilation. The second part of this book is on religious beliefs and theological issues, in which there is a treatise on rejecting Sufism.
3. Qanaem al-Ayyam fi Masael al-Halal va al-Haram (Arabic: غنائم الايام في مسائل الحلال و الحرام, title means: The spoils of days in matters of halal and haram): Argumentative jurisprudence in the chapters of worship.
4. Manahej al-Ahkam (Arabic: مناهج الاحكام, title means: Judgment methods): In Ritual purity, prayer and chapters of transactions.
5. Moayyan al-Khawas (Arabic: معين الخواص, title means: Definite properties): It is an Arabic practical treatise that Mirza-ye Qomi wrote for his Arab imitators and includes the jurisprudence of worship.
6. Jawame al-Masael fi Tahqiq al-Foroue va al-Usul bed Dalael (Arabic: جوامع المسائل في تحقيق مسائل الفروع و الاصول بالدلائل, title means: Collections of issues in the investigation of issues of branches and essential with evidences): This book is about Fiqh and Principles of Islamic jurisprudence in Arabic, which contains a total of seventeen treatises.
7. Resaleye Usule Din (Persian: رساله اصول دين, title means: Treatise on the Principles of Religion): About Theology of Twelvers beliefs.
8. Hashiye bar Qawanin (Persian: حاشیه بر قوانین, title means: Notes on the Laws): This book is in the Principles of Islamic jurisprudence, and it answers the objections to the book of Qawanin al-Usul.
9. Hashiye bar Zobdat al-Usule Sheikh Bahayi (Persian: حاشیه بر زبده‌الاصول شیخ بهایی, title means: Notes on the book "Zobdat al-Usul" of Baha' al-din al-'Amili): on the Principles of Islamic jurisprudence.
10. Hashiye bar Tahzib al-Usule Allame Helli (Persian: حاشیه بر تهذیب‌الاصول علامه حِلّی, title means: Notes on the book "Tahzib al-Usul" of Allamah Al-Hilli): on the Principles of Islamic jurisprudence.
11. Hashiye bar Sharhe Mokhtasare Ibn Hajib Azdi (Persian: حاشیه بر شرح مختصر ابن‌حاجب عضدی, title means: Notes on the brief description of Ibn Hajib Azdi): on the Principles of Islamic jurisprudence.
12. Morshed al-Awam (Arabic: مرشدالعوام, title means: Public guide): Risalah (fiqh) in Persian language.
13. Manzoomeh ee dar Elme Badie (dar 140 beit) va Manzoomeh ee dar Elme Bayan (Arabic: منظومه‌ای در علم بدیع (در ۱۴۰ بیت) و منظومه‌ای در علم بیان, title means: A poetry system in novel science (in 140 verses) and a poetry system in rhetoric)
14. Fathiyeh (Persian: فتحیه)
15. Diwane Sher (Persian: دیوان شعر (۵٬۰۰۰ بیت شعر فارسی و عربی), title means: Diwan of Poetry (5,000 lines of Persian and Arabic poetry))
16. Resaleh ee Piramoone Mowzoo va Hokme Qena (Persian: رساله‌ای پیرامون موضوع و حکم غناء, title means: Treatise on the subject and sentence of singing)
17. Resaleh ee dar Omoomiate Hormate Reba dar Tamame Moavezat (Persian: رساله‌ای در عمومیت حرمت ربا در تمام معاوضات, title means: A treatise on the generality of the prohibition of usury in all exchanges)
18. Majmooe ee az Nasayeh va Mavaez (Nameye Mofassal be Fathali Shah Qajar) (Persian: مجموعه‌ای از نصایح و مواعظ (نامه مفصل به فتحعلی‌شاه قاجار), title means: A collection of advice and sermons (detailed letter to Fath Ali Shah Qajar))
19. Resaleh ee dar Radde Sufieh va Ghulat (Arabic: رساله‌ای در رد صوفیه و غُلات, title means: A treatise on the rejection of Sufism and Ghulat)

In addition to the above works, Mirza-ye Qomi has written several treatises on Principles of Islamic jurisprudence, the number of which is unknown. Some have counted his collection of over a thousand works, most of which are his treatises. Some of these treatises are at the end of the book of Jameh al-Shatat and also the book of Qanaem al-Ayyam fi Masael al-Halal va al-Haram, and some of them are also available as manuscripts in private and public libraries.

Mirza-ye Qomi had many correspondences with Qajar dynasty kings, especially Fath Ali Shah, but unfortunately only a very small number of these letters are available. Among the most important of them are:

1. Ershad Nameh (Persian: ارشادنامه, title means: Guidance letter): It is an advisory letter written to one of the kings of Qajar. According to the evidence, the addressee of this letter is Agha Mohammad Khan Qajar; Although some have considered Fath Ali Shah as its addressee. This letter contains a part of Mirza-ye Qomi 's political thought.
2. Nameye Mirza-ye Qomi be Fath Ali Shah (Persian: نامه ميرزای قمی به فتحعلی شاه, title means: Mirza-ye Qomi's letter to Fath Ali Shah): This letter was written in response to Fath Ali Shah's request to comment on the treatise of Mirza Abdul Wahab Monshi al-Mamalek, and to reject it and advice him to stay away from the Sufi sect.

== Demise ==
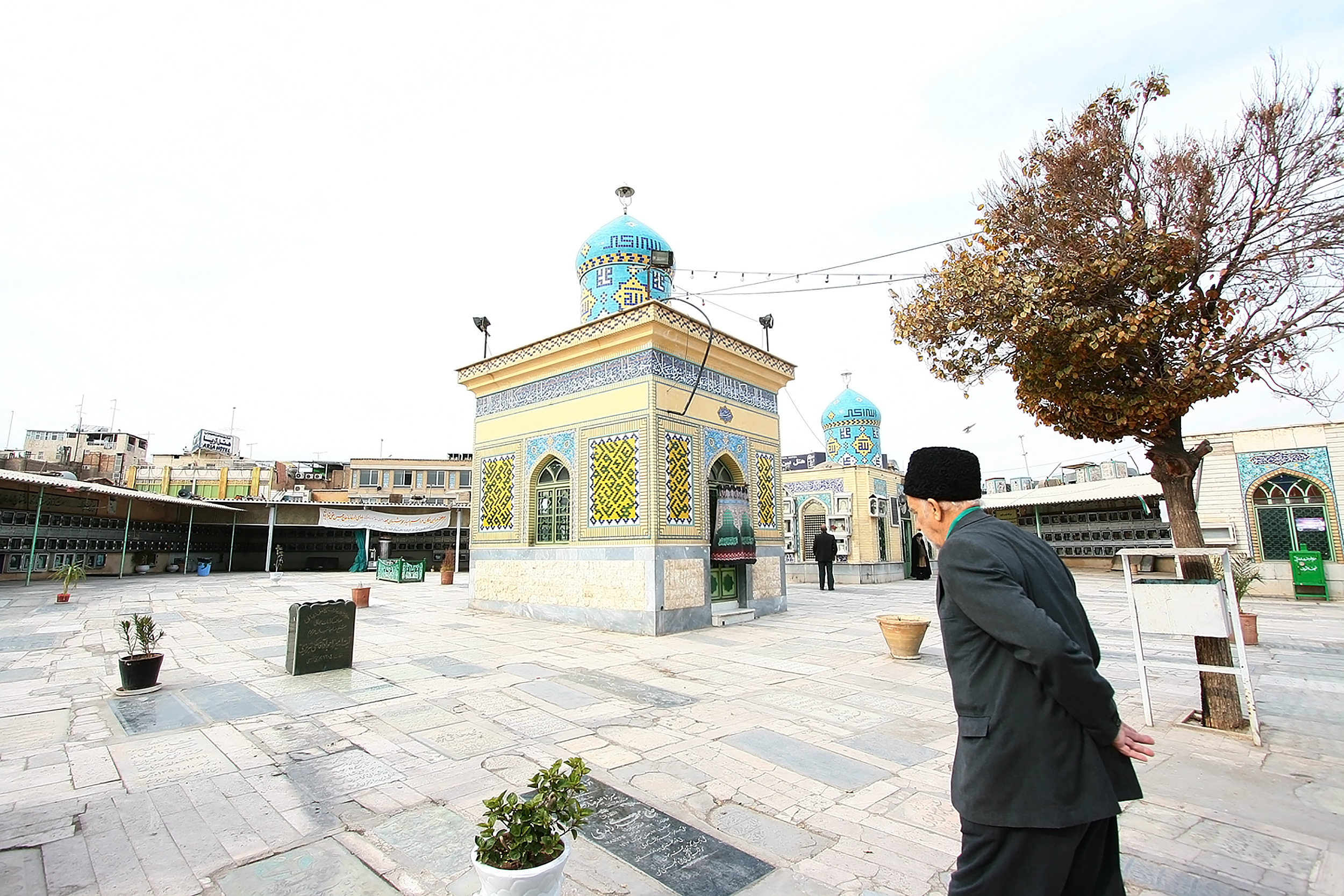
Mirza-ye Qomi's tomb in Sheikhan Cemetery, Qom, Iran.

Mirza-ye Qomi died in 1815 CE (1231 AH) and was buried in Sheikhan Cemetery in Qom, Iran.

== Memorial ==
Mirza-ye Qomi Square in Ayatollah Taleghani Street (Azar Street) in Qom is named after him.

== See also ==
- Mohammad Ibrahim Kalbasi
- Zakaria ibn Idris Ash'ari Qomi
- Seyyed Mohammad Hojjat Kooh Kamari
- Ahmad ibn Ishaq Ash'ari Qomi
- Zakaria ibn Adam Ash'ari Qomi
- Mohammad Jafar Sabzevari
- Mohaghegh Sabzevari
