= Zakaria ibn Adam Ash'ari Qomi =

Shia Muslim scholar from the 8th century

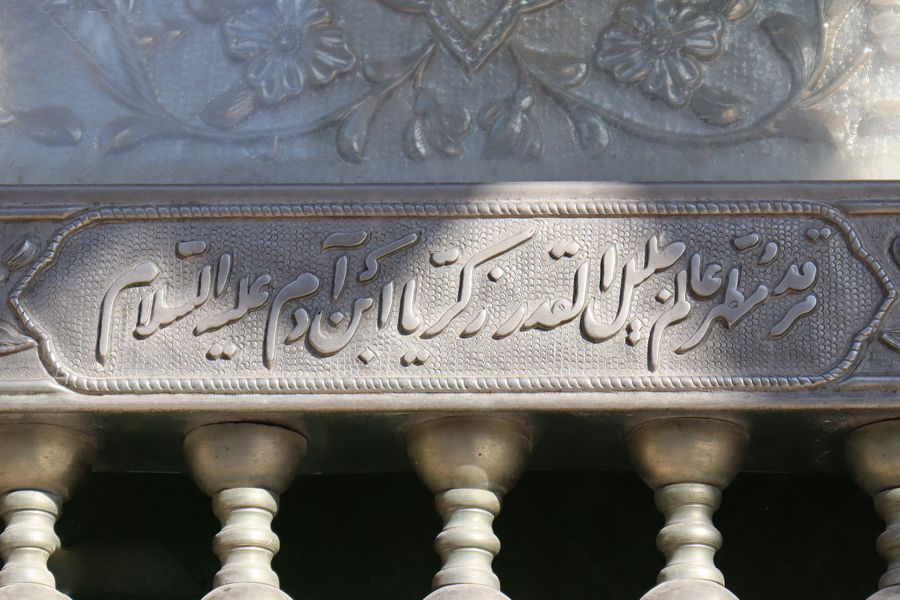

Personal life
- Born: 8th century
- Died: 819 or 835
- Era: Islamic golden age
- Main interest: Muhaddith

Religious life
- Religion: Islam
- Denomination: Shia
- Sect: Twelver

Muslim leader
- Teacher: Ja'far al-Sadiq, Musa al-Kadhim, Ali al-Ridha, Muhammad al-Jawad

Zakaria ibn Adam Ash'ari Qomi (Persian: زکریا بن آدم اَشْعَری قمی) was an 8th century Shia Muslim muhaddith and a companion of sixth Shia Imam Ja'far al-Sadiq (c. 732–765). He was also a narrator (Hadith transmitter) from the seventh Shia Imam Musa al-Kadhim (c. 765–799), and an agent of the eighth and ninth Shia Imams, Ali al-Ridha (c. 766–818) and Muhammad al-Jawad (c. 819–835) respectively, in Qom.

== Genealogy ==
Zakaria ibn Adam Ash'ari Qomi also known as Abu Yahya (Persian: ابو یحیی) is from the "Al-Ashari" family who migrated from Kufa to Qom. His father is Adam ibn Abdullah ibn Sa'd Ash'ari, whom Shaykh Tusi has considered one of the companions of Ja'far al-Sadiq (the sixth Shia Imam). Adam ibn Abdullah has narrated a hadith from Ali al-Ridha (the eighth Shia Imam) transmitted by his son Zakaria.

His brother Ishaq ibn Adam was one of the narrators of Ali al-Ridha (the eighth Shia Imam) and his cousin Zakaria ibn Idris was also one of the narrators of Ja'far al-Sadiq (the sixth Shia Imam), Musa al-Kadhim (the seventh Shia Imam) and Ali al-Ridha (the eighth Shia Imam).

== His position with the Imams ==
=== Ja'far al-Sadiq and Musa al-Kadhim ===
Shaykh Tusi has considered Zakaria ibn Adam Ash'ari Qomi one of the companions of Ja'far al-Sadiq (the sixth Shia Imam). None of the Islam scholar's sources have called him one of the companions of Musa al-Kadhim (the seventh Shia Imam), but he has been mentioned among the narrators (hadith transmitter) of this Imam.

=== Agent of Ali al-Ridha ===
Shaykh Tusi has also considered Zakaria ibn Adam Ash'ari Qomi one of the companions of Ali al-Ridha (the eighth Shia Imam). According to some narrations, Ali al-Ridha referred people to Zakaria ibn Adam in religious matters and introduced him as trustworthy in matters of religion and the world. He received the religious funds of the people of Qom as the agent of the Imam. On a Hajj pilgrimage from Medina to Mecca, Zakaria ibn Adam traveled with Ali al-Ridha.

According to a narration, Zakaria ibn Adam said to Ali al-Ridha (the eighth Shia Imam): "I want to leave my family because idiots and ignorant people have increased among them". The Imam said to him: "O Zakaria, do not do this and do not emigrate from Qom, through your existence, God removes the calamity from your family (in another version: from the people of Qom) because of you, just as He removes the calamity from the people of Baghdad because of my father Musa al-Kadhim".

=== Agent of Muhammad al-Jawad ===
Zakaria ibn Adam is also considered among the companions of Muhammad al-Jawad (the ninth Shiite Imam). According to the narration of the book Rijal al-Kashshi, he was the agent of the ninth Imam of the Shiites in Qom.

== Bibliograghy ==
Islam scholar's sources attributed a book and a series of issues to Zakaria ibn Adam that have been narrated in different methods. Apparently, this set of issues was Zakaria ibn Adam 's questions from Ali al-Ridha (the eighth Shia Imam):

- Matters from al-Ridha (Arabic: مسائله للرضا (علیه‌السّلام))
- Book of Hadith (Arabic: کتاب الحدیث)

He has narrated (transmitted) about forty hadiths (with or without intermediaries) from the Imams.

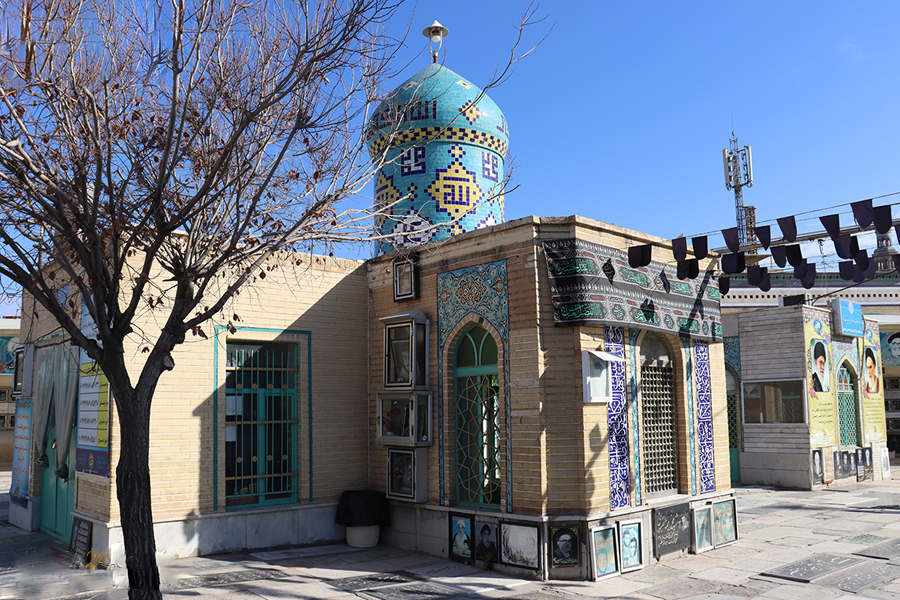
Zakaria ibn Adam Ash'ari Qomi tomb, Sheikhan cemetery, Qom, Iran.

== Demise ==
Some have said that the date of Zakaria's death was between 819 and 835 (between 204 and 220 AH) and at the same time with the birth of Muhammad al-Jawad (the ninth Shia Imam). Others say he died away during the life of Muhammad al-Jawad and after his death, the imam wrote about him in a letter:

May God have mercy on him on the day he was born, on the day he died, and on the day he will be resurrected. During his life, he was a mystic, a believer and a follower of the right to life, and he willed what is obligatory in the sight of God and His Messenger. He - may God have mercy on him - passed away without breaking the covenant and turning the verdict. May God reward him for his good intentions and his efforts.

His grave is in Qom in Sheikhan cemetery near the Fatima Masumeh Shrine.

== See also ==
- Zakaria ibn Idris Ash'ari Qomi
- Ahmad ibn Ishaq Ash'ari Qomi
- Seyyed Mohammad Hojjat Kooh Kamari
- Mohammad ibn Umar Kashshi
- Mirza-ye Qomi
- Agha Hossein Khansari
- Mohammad Jafar Sabzevari
- Mohaghegh Sabzevari
