= Naman, Razavi Khorasan =

Village in Razavi Khorasan province, Iran

Naman Persian: نامن
- Village
- Location within Iran
- Coordinates: 36°09′17″N 57°21′31″E
- Country: Iran
- Province: Razavi Khorasan
- County: Davarzan
- District: Bashtin
- Rural District: Bashtin

Population (2016)
  - Total: 1,175
- Time zone: UTC+3:30 (IRST)

Naman (Persian: نامن) (Note: Also romanized as Nāman and Nāmen) is a village in Bashtin Rural District of Bashtin District in Davarzan County, Razavi Khorasan province, Iran.

== Demographics ==
=== Population ===
At the time of the 2006 National Census, the village's population was 1,083 in 344 households, when it was in the former Davarzan District of Sabzevar County. The following census in 2011 counted 1,081 people in 393 households. The 2016 census measured the population of the village as 1,175 people in 446 households, by which time the district had been separated from the county in the establishment of Davarzan County. The rural district was transferred to the new Bashtin District. Naman was the most populous village in its rural district.
