= Agha Hossein Khansari =

17th-century Twelver shiite scholar of the Safavid Empire

- آقا حسین خوانساری
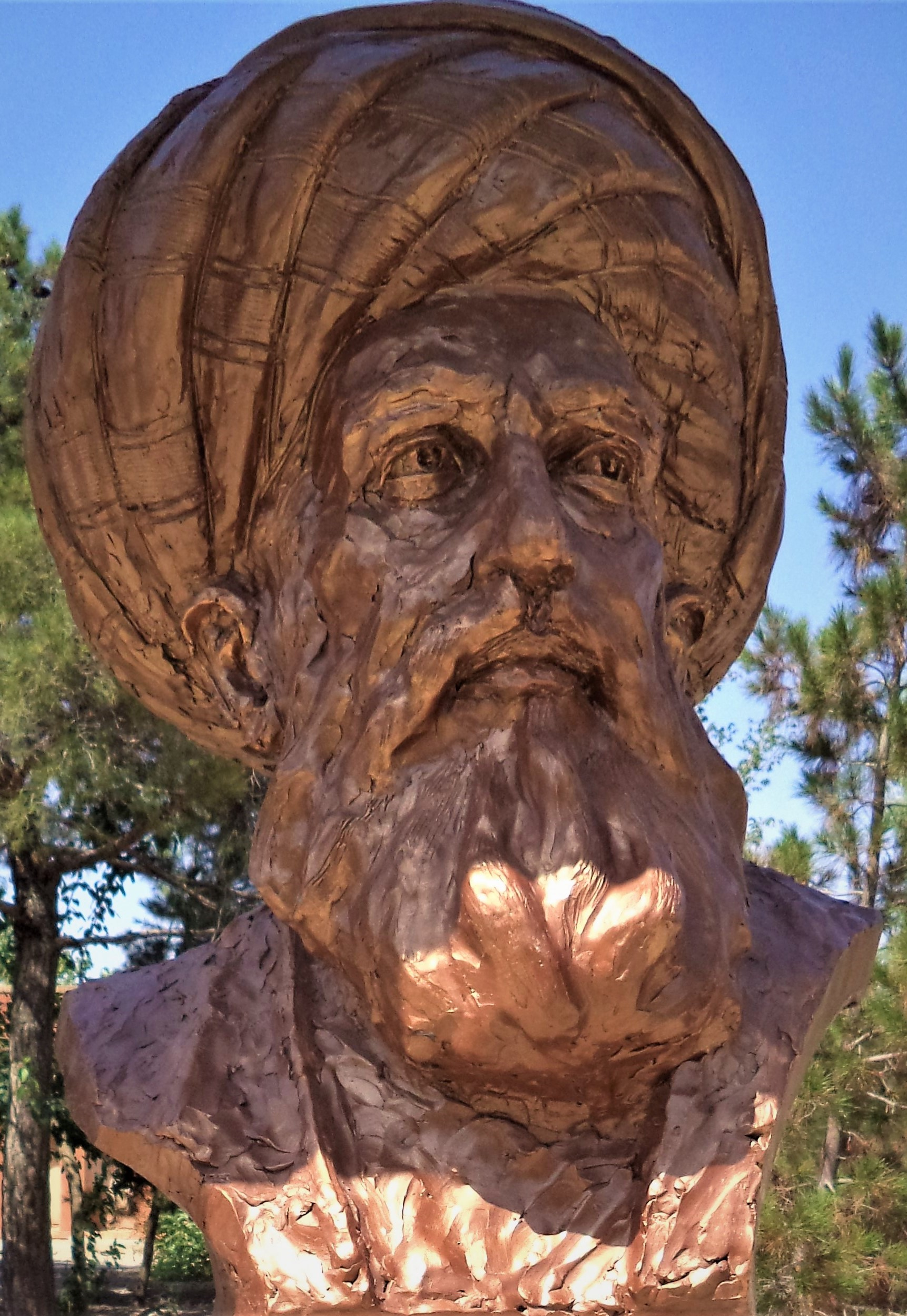
- Head statue of Agha Hosein Khansari

Personal life
- Born: Hossein ibn Jamal al-Din Mohammad Khansari; 1607 Khansar, Safavid Iran
- Died: 1687 (aged 79–80) Isfahan, Safavid Iran
- Resting place: Takht-e Foulad; 32°37′39″N 51°40′59″E
- Home town: Khansar
- Children: Agha Jamal Khansari Sa'adatyar; Agha Razi Khansari Sa'adatyar
- Education: Isfahan Seminary
- Other name: Mohaghegh Khansari

Religious life
- Religion: Islam
- Denomination: Shia
- Jurisprudence: Ja'fari
- Creed: Twelver

Muslim leader
- Teacher: Mir Fendereski; Mohammad Taghi Majlesi; Mohammad Bagher Sabzevari; Khalifeh Soltan
- Post: Officiacion of Suleiman of Persia in some travels Shaykh al-Islam of Isfahan
- Period in office: 1683 - 1687
- Predecessor: Mir Seyyed Mohammad Masum
- Successor: Mohammad-Baqer Majlesi
- Students: Al-Hurr al-Amili; Mohammad-Baqer Majlesi; Sheikh Jafar Qazi; Nematollah Jazayeri

Agha Hossein Khansari (Persian: آقا حسین خوانساری), full name Hossein ibn Jamal al-Din Mohammad Khansari (Persian: حسین بن جمال الدین محمد خوانساری), known as Mohaghegh Khansari (Persian: محقق خوانساری) and also known as "Master of all in all" (Arabic: استاد الکلّ فی الکلّ), who was nicknamed "the disciple of mankind" (Arabic: تلمیذ البشر) because of the many masters he acquired knowledge in their presence, was one of the great Iranian jurists of Isfahan jurisprudential school (born in 1607 in Khansar, died in 1687 in Isfahan) in the 11th century AH, who was also engaged in philosophy and wisdom. He was one of the high level scholars during the reign of Sultan Suleiman of the Safavid dynasty and after the death of Mir Seyyed Mohammad Masoom in 1683, he became the Shaykh al-Islām of Isfahan. His children are Jamaluddin Mohammad known as Agha Jamal Khansari and Raziauddin Mohammad known as Agha Razi Khansari.

== Life and educations ==
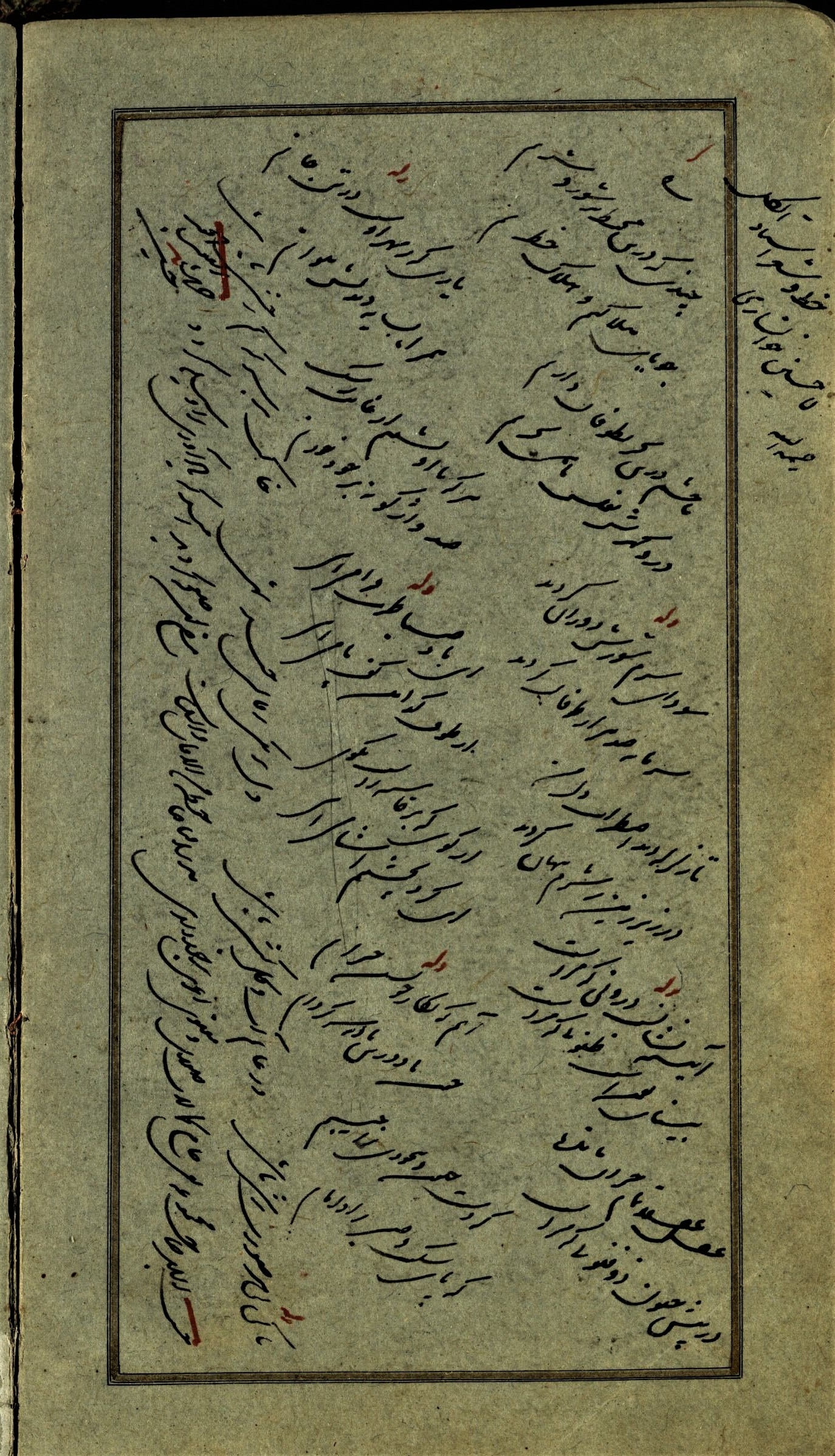
Islamic Manuscript (a poem) by Agha Hosein Khansari

Agha Hossein Khansari was born in 1607 in Khansar, Iran. Before reaching the age of puberty, Agha Hossein went to Isfahan to study Islamic sciences and studied at Khajeh Molk School of Isfahan Seminary. In Isfahan, he used the presence of many professors and for this reason he called himself "the disciple of mankind" which refers to the multiplicity of his professors.

He studied the rational sciences under the tutelage of Mir Fendereski and the traditional sciences under the tutelage of Mohammad Taghi Majlesi, Khalifeh Soltan, Mohammad Bagher Sabzevari, Heydar Khansari and Agha Hossein Khansari had important permits in review and issuance of Islamic scientific content, including the permission of about 20 pages from Mohammad Taghi Majlesi. Although he was afflicted with poverty during his studies, he eventually reached the point where Shah Suleiman entrusted him with the position of viceroy and overseer on the monarchy and the care of state affairs. He was proficient in rational and traditional sciences and, according to Mirza Abdollah Afandi Isfahani, was a "supporter of the scholars."

== Influence on others ==
=== From the point of view of Iranian scholars ===
Ali Khamenei, the current Supreme Leader of Iran, has said about the Khansari family:

"Undoubtedly, in the list of these often unknown stars in the sky of science and culture, the great family of Khansari, especially the prominent and unique researcher, the late Agha Hossein Khansari and his son, the wise and honorable Faqih, the late Agha Jamal Khansari. In the greatness and dignity of the late Agha Hossein Khansari, it is enough that great scholars such as Vahid Behbahani and Sheikh Ansari have mentioned him with the titles of "researcher" and "master of all in all" and the like. He and his son were sages, jurists, fundamentalists, theologians, mathematicians, Hadith narrators, and writers, and they made a great contribution to the flourishing and prosperity of the cultural and scientific field of Isfahan in the middle and late Safavid period. Although some of their jurisprudential works have been used by scholars, their collection of works has never been available to Islamic scholars in an acceptable manner."

— Congress in honor of researchers, Agha Hossein, Agha Jamal and Agha Razi Khansari (September 20, 1999)

Morteza Motahhari, has said about Agha Hossein Khansari:

"Agha Hossein Khansari, known as Mohaghegh Khansari, was brought up in the school of Isfahan and had comprehensive knowledge in rational and traditional sciences. His famous book in Fiqh is called "Mashareq al-Shomoos", which is a description on the book of "Al-Doroos" of Shahid Awwal."

— Understanding Islamic Sciences (1979)

=== Political and social activity: Influence on the Safavid shah Suleiman I ===
Agha Hossein Khansari had a special place in the government of Shah Suleiman, so that when the Shah traveled, he asked Agha Hossein Khansari to run the government affairs as his viceroy; And Agha Hossein Khansari had accepted.

Another prominent feature of Agha Hossein Khansari was his refuge for the poor and helpless, and he made great efforts to meet the needs of the people.

== Work and contribution ==
=== Students ===
Agha Hossein Khansari taught in both the rational and traditional categories and has trained prominent students in the field of Islamic sciences, including:

- Al-Hurr al-Amili
- Nematollah Jazayeri
- Mohammad-Baqer Majlesi
- Mohammad Saleh Hosseini Khatoon Abadi, who studied with him for 20 years.
- Mohammad Bagher Hosseini Khatoon Abadi
- Agha Jamal Khansari, his son.
- Agha Razi Khansari, his other son.
- Sheikh Jafar Qazi
- Mirza Mohammad ibn Hassan Shirvani
- Mullah Mohammad Jafar Sabzevari
- Mohammad ibn Abdolfattah Tonekaboni
- Alireza Shirazi, who was a great poet.
- Mirza Abdollah Afandi

=== Works ===
Agha Hossein Khansari was a prolific writer and left many works. His writings can be divided into 3 categories:

==== Printed works ====
- Masharegh al-Shomoos fi Sharhe al-Doroos (Arabic: مشارق الشموس فی شرح الدروس, English meaning: The Golden Tips in the Explanation of the Doroos): His famous book in Islamic jurisprudence, which is a commentary on the book of Al-Doroos written by Muhammad Jamaluddin al-Makki al-Amili (1334–1385). This book is incomplete and Agha Hossein Khansari has not succeeded in completing the description of the news of The Twelve Imams and the speeches of the Twelver jurists in each topic. Mohammad Bagher Khansari in his book Rawdat Al-Janat has said that this book is unique in terms of the number of researches. This book has been published twice in 1888 and 1893 in Tehran.
- Taligheh bar Hashieh Mohaghegh Sabzevari (Persian: تعلیقه بر حاشیه محقق سبزواری, English meaning: Comment on the Hashieh of Mohaghegh Sabzevari): Comment on the book Hashieh of the author Mohammad Bagher Sabzevari, Tehran, 1899
- Al-Resaleh fi Moghadamat al-Vajeb (Arabic: الرسالة فی مقدمةالواجب, English meaning: The message in the introduction to the assignment): Iran, 1899

==== Manuscripts ====
- Hashieh Esharat (Persian: حاشیه اشارات, English meaning: Comment on the book "Isharat")
- Ensha Darbareye Hormate Sharaab (Persian: انشاء درباره حرمت شراب, English meaning: Essay on the sanctity of wine)
- Hashieh bar Sharhe Tajreede Allame Helli (Persian: حاشیه بر شرح تجرید علامه حلی, English meaning: Comment on the book "Sharhe Tajreed" of Allamah Al-Hilli)
- Hashieh bar Mohakemat (Persian: حاشیه بر محاکمات, English meaning: Comment on the book "Mohakemat")
- Hashieh bar Elahiate Shafa (Persian: حاشیه بر الهیات شفا, English meaning: Comment on the book "Elahiate Shafa")
- Ensha dar Tarife Bahar (Persian: انشاء در تعریف بهار, English meaning: Essay in the definition of spring)
- Hashieh bar Motavval (Persian: حاشیه بر مطول, English meaning: Comment on the book "Motavval")
- Hashieh bar Mokhtasar al-Osool (Persian: حاشیه بر مختصر الاصول, English meaning: Comment on the book "Mokhtasar al-Osool")
- Resaleh Ejmae (Persian: رساله اجماع, English meaning: Thesis of Consensus)
- Tarife Sokhan (Persian: تعریف سخن, English meaning: Definition of speech)
- Shobheye Tafreh (Persian: شبهه طفره, English meaning: Suspicion of evasion)
- Fayedeh Darbareh Elme Bari Ta'ali (Persian: فایده درباره علم باری تعالی, English meaning: Benefits of the science of transcendence)
- Resaleh dar Khoms (Persian: رساله در خمس, English meaning: Treatise on Khums)
- Halle Shakk dar Taghseeme Jesm ta Binahaayat (Persian: حل شک در تقسیم جسم تا بی‌نهایت, English meaning: Resolving doubt in the division of the body to infinity)

==== Attributed works ====
- Al-Maedeh al-Soleimanieh (Arabic: المائدةالسلیمانیة, English meaning: Soleimanieh dining): About foods and drinks for Shah Suleiman of the Safavid dynasty.
- Tarjomeye Sahifeh Sajjadieh beh Farsi (Persian: ترجمه صحیفه سجادیه به فارسی, English meaning: Translation of Al-Sahifa al-Sajjadiyya into Persian)
- Resaleh dar Jabr va Ekhtiar (Persian: رساله در جبر و اختیار, English meaning: Treatise on Force and Authority)
- Javaher va Aeraz (Persian: جواهر و اعراض, English meaning: Essences and Accidents)
- Sharhe Kafieh Ibne Hajeb (Persian: شرح کافیه ابن‌حاجب, English meaning: Explanation on the book "Kafieh" of Ibne Hajeb)
- Sharhe Hey'at Farsi Qushchi (Persian: شرح هیأت فارسی قوشجی, English meaning: Explanation on the book "Hey'at" of Qushchi)
- Resaleh dar Shobheh Iman va Kofr (Persian: رساله در شبهه ایمان و کفر, English meaning: Treatise on Doubt of Faith and Unbelief)
- Resaleh dar Shobheh Estelzam (Persian: رساله در شبهه استلزام, English meaning: Treatise on Suspicion of Implication)
- Resaleh dar Tashkik (Persian: رساله در تشکیک, English meaning: Treatise on Doubt)
- Tarjomeye Ketabe Nahj ol-Haq Allame Helli beh Farsi Baraye Shah Soleiman Safavi (Persian: ترجمه کتاب نهج‌الحق علّامه حلّی به فارسی برای شاه‌سلیمان صفوی, English meaning: Translation of Allamah Al-Hilli's book Nahj al-Haq into Persian for the Shah Suleiman of the Safavid dynasty)
- Tafsire Sooreh Fateheh (Persian: تفسیر سوره فاتحه, English meaning: Interpretation of Surah Al-Fatiha)
- Hashieh bar Sharhe Hekmat al-Eyn (Persian: حاشیه بر شرح حکمة‌العین, English meaning: Comment on the book "Sharhe Hekmat al-Eyn")

== Death ==
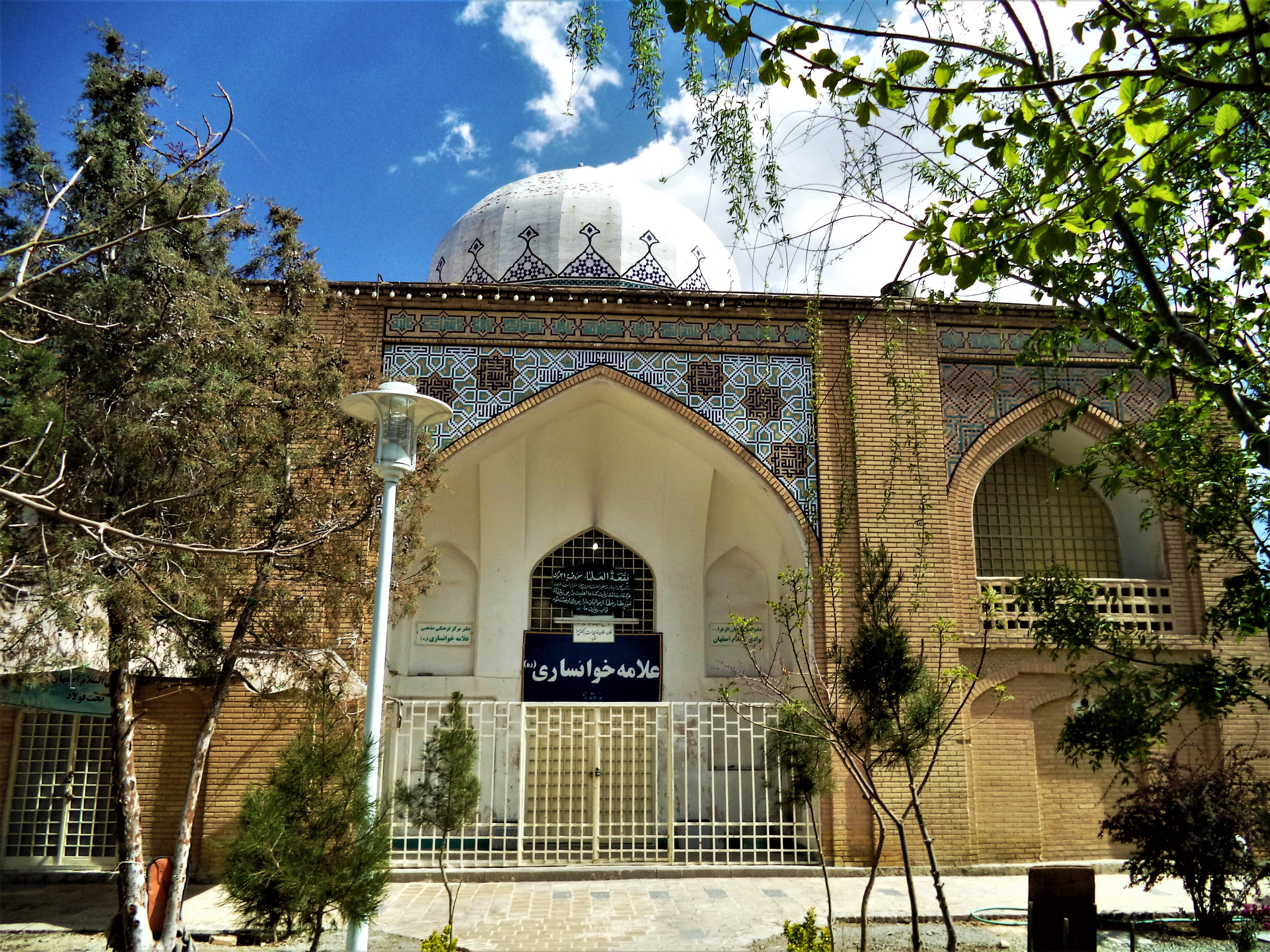
Agha Hossein Khansari Mausoleum, Takht-e Foulad, Isfahan, Iran

He died on 13 May 1687 at the age of eighty-two in Isfahan and was buried in the Takht-e Foulad cemetery, near the tomb of Baba Rokneddin Beyzayi. His sons Agha Jamaluddin and Agha Raziauddin are also buried there, in a tomb named Khansari Mausoleum.

== See also ==
- Mohammad Ibrahim Kalbasi
- Mirza-ye Qomi
- Zakaria ibn Idris Ash'ari Qomi
- Seyyed Mohammad Hojjat Kooh Kamari
- Ahmad ibn Ishaq Ash'ari Qomi
- Zakaria ibn Adam Ash'ari Qomi
- Sayyed Ibrahim Estahbanati
- Aqa Najafi Quchani
