= Sheykh ol-Eslam's House =

Iranian National Heritage Site

- خانه شیخ الاسلام
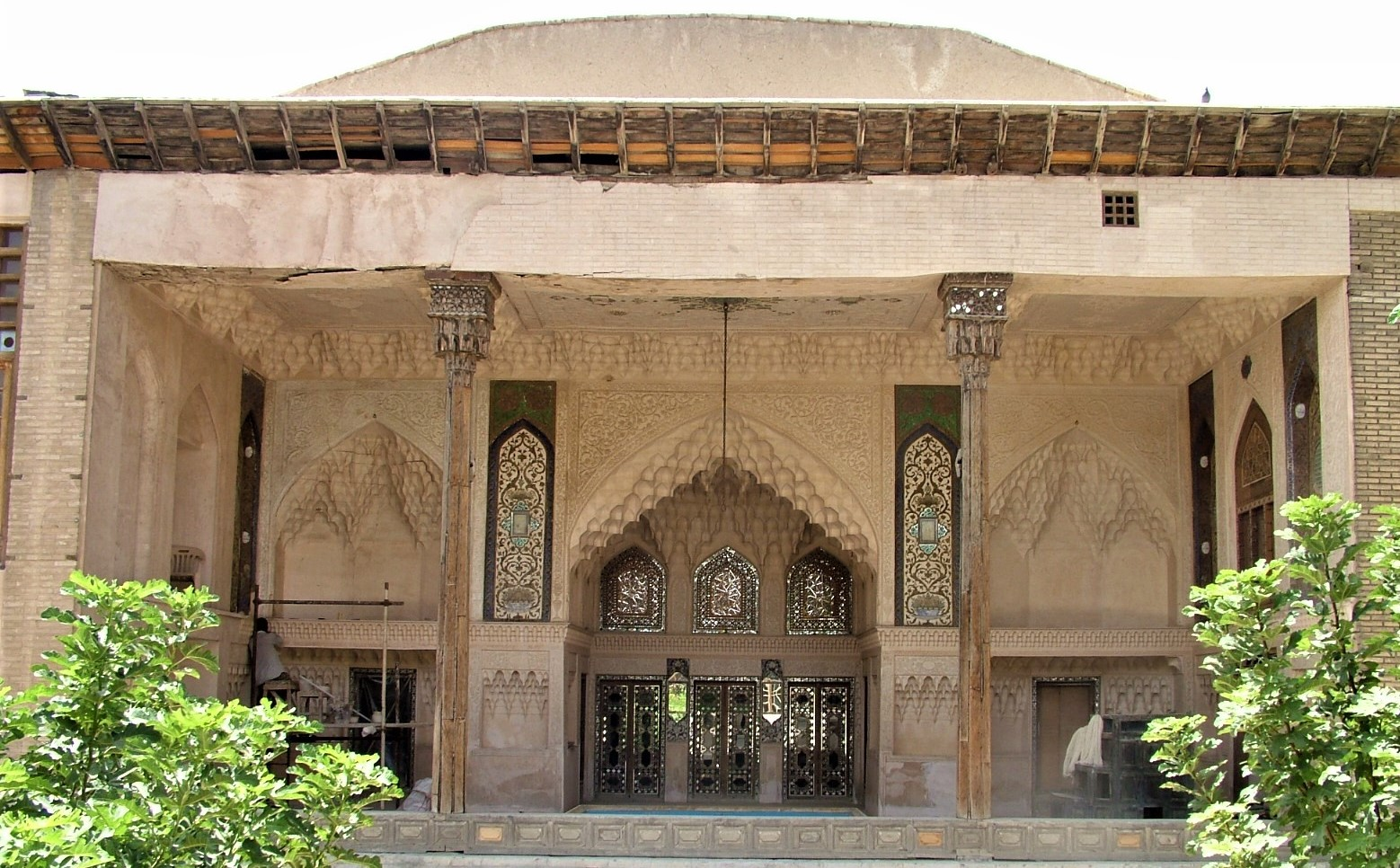

- Location within Iran

General information
- Status: Cultural
- Type: House
- Architectural style: Safavid style; Qajar style
- Location: Isfahan, Iran
- Coordinates: 32.6647°N 51.6718°E

The Sheykh ol-Eslam's house is a house dating to the Safavid and Qajar eras in Isfahan, Iran. On 20 September 1974, it was registered as a national monument of Iran.

== History and name ==
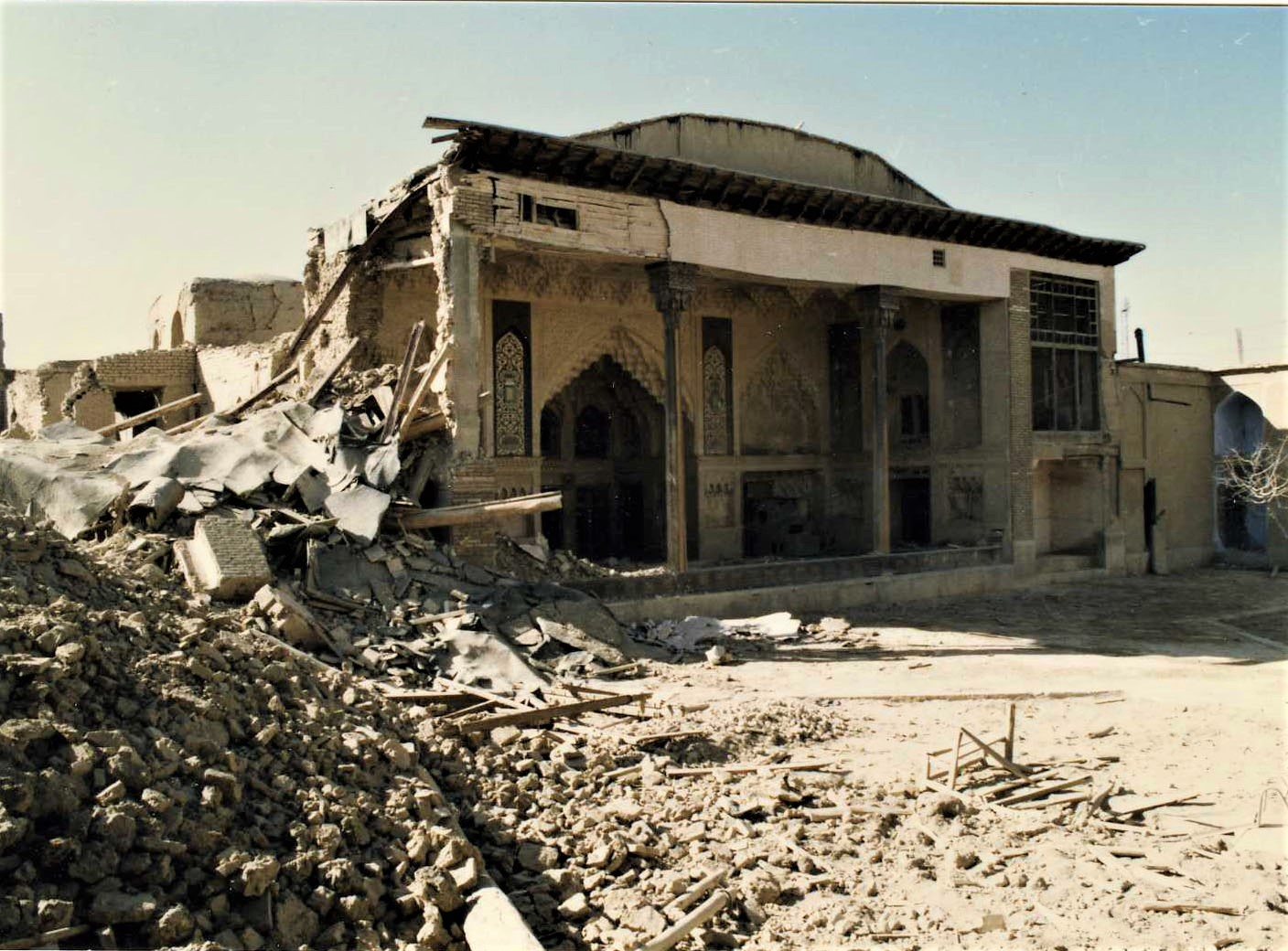
The south eastern part of the house destroyed in an Iraqi bombing, 1986

The house or court of Shaykh ol-Eslam was built in the Safavid era and new decorations were added to it in the Qajar era. In 1986, it was bombed in the War of the cities, a part of the Iran–Iraq War.

== Architecture ==
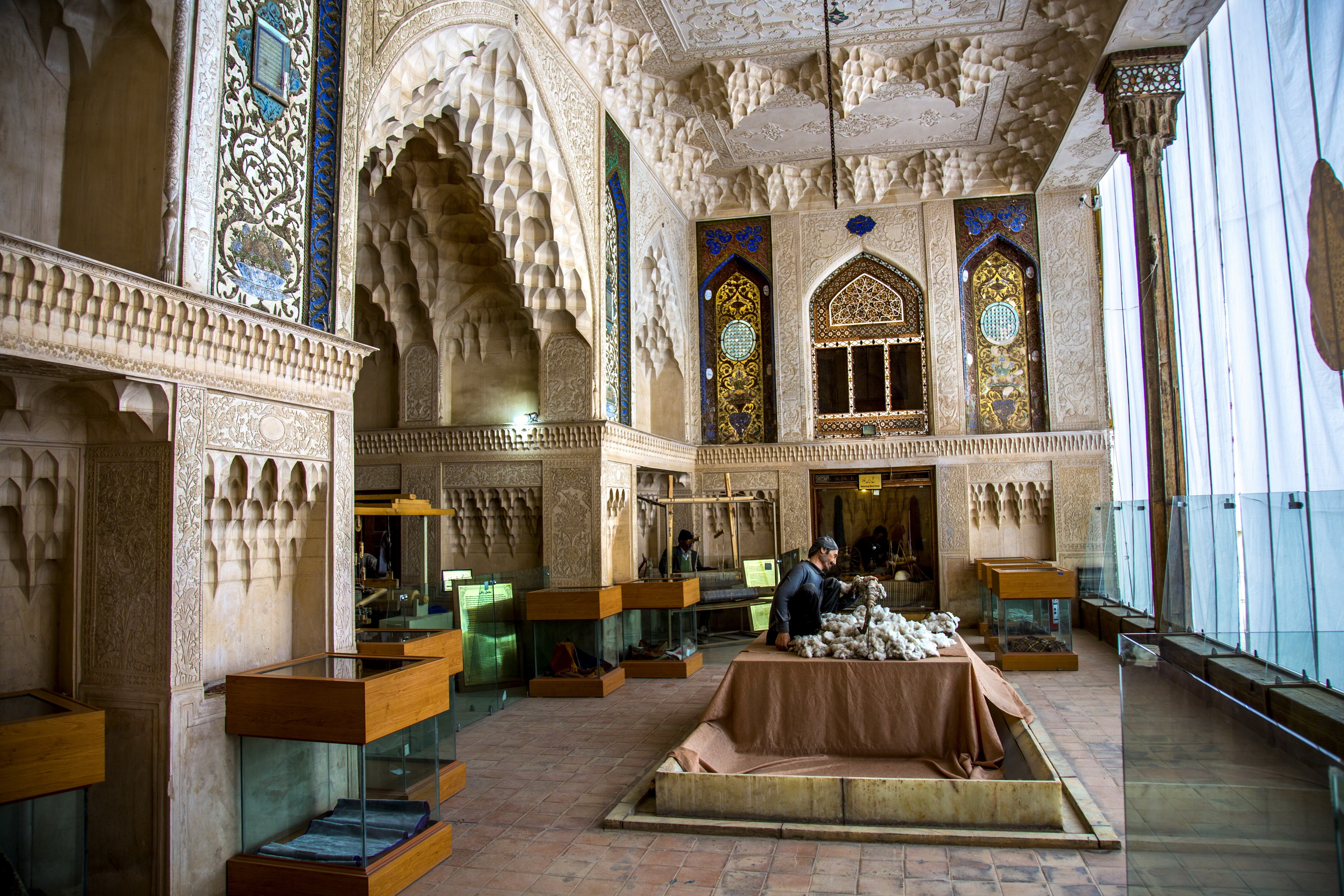
Interior of the house

The house is built on the northern and southern sides of a large yard. The reason for this unusual plan, which is completely different from other historical houses in Isfahan, is that the yard had been built originally as a Tekyeh for religious ceremonies. The main parts of the structure are on the southern side of the yard behind a veranda. Stucco, ayeneh-kari and muqarnas have made this part of the house much more prominent. There is a big reception hall with two rooms behind the southern veranda, and a howz and two small flower gardens opposite the northern veranda. In the southwestern part of the house, there is a small courtyard, which is connected to the main courtyard by a narrow corridor.

== Reasons for registering as a national work ==
The main part of the house is owned by the Cultural Heritage Organization.

== Traditional Textile House ==
The Cultural Heritage Organization inaugurated a traditional textile house in Isfahan on 7 February 2011, at the Sheikh al-Islam House. It is open to the public from 8:30 until 14:15 every day except for Fridays and public holidays.

== Gallery ==
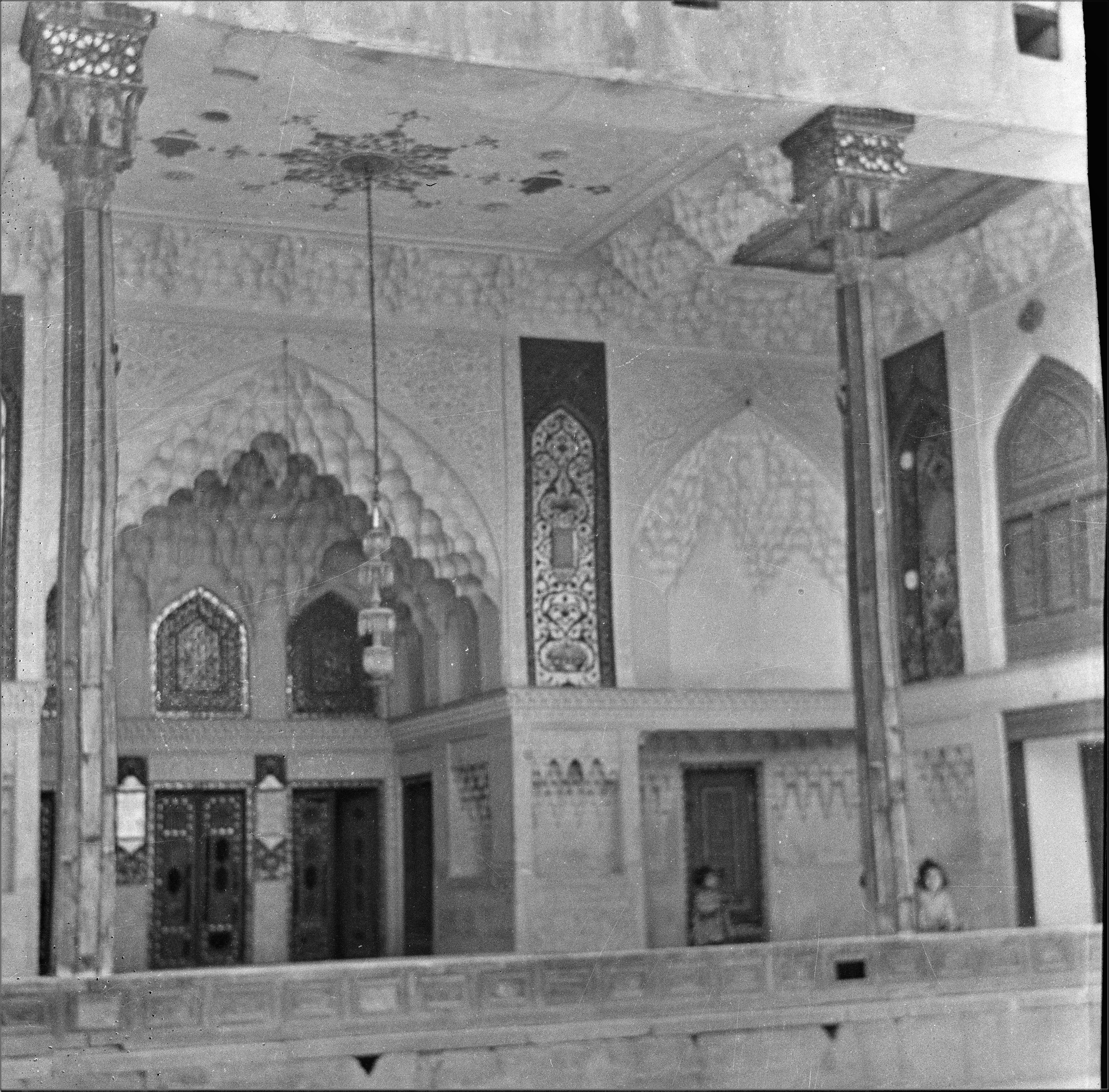
The house in 1956

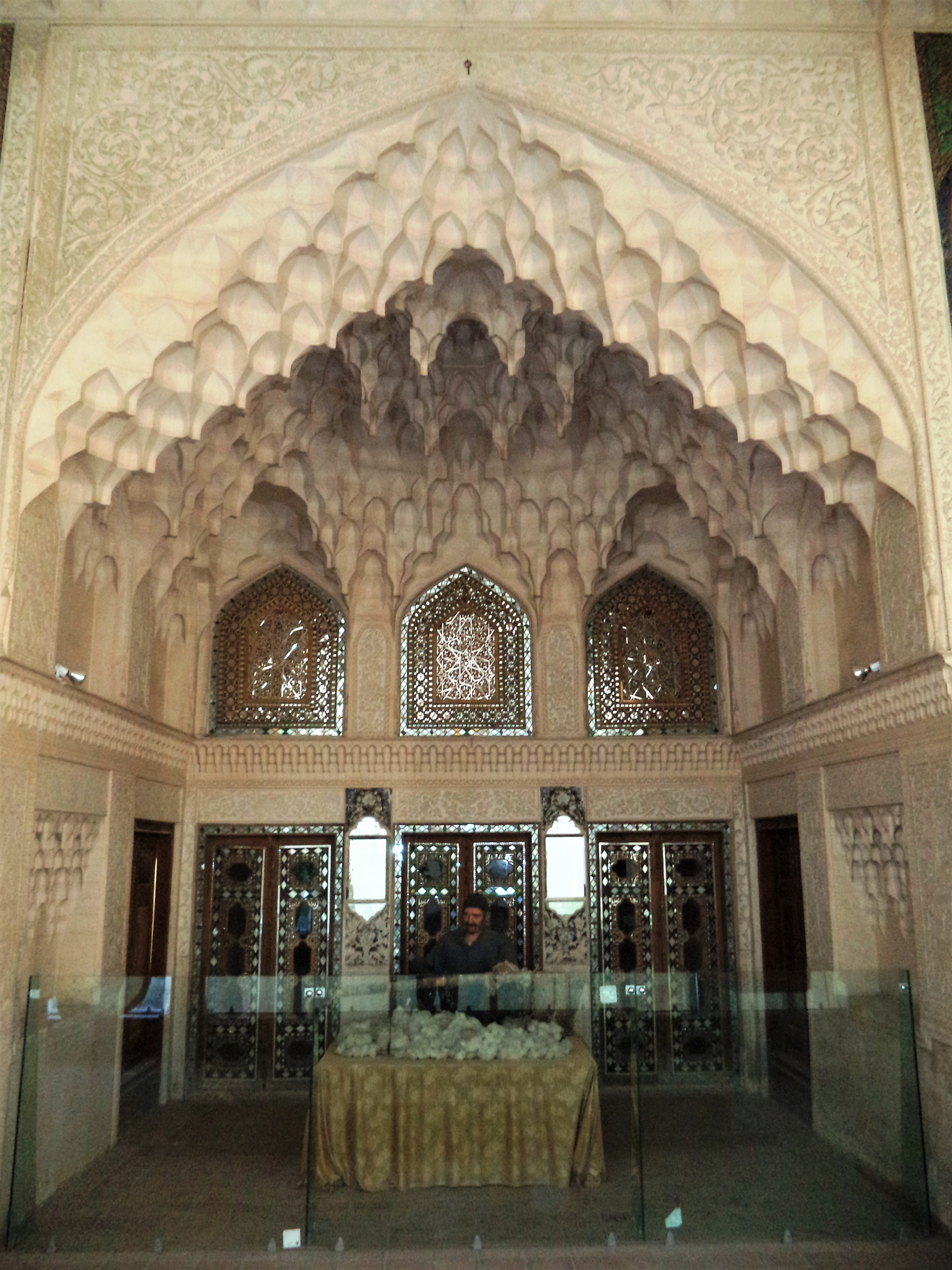
Muqarnas and Ayeneh-kari decorations

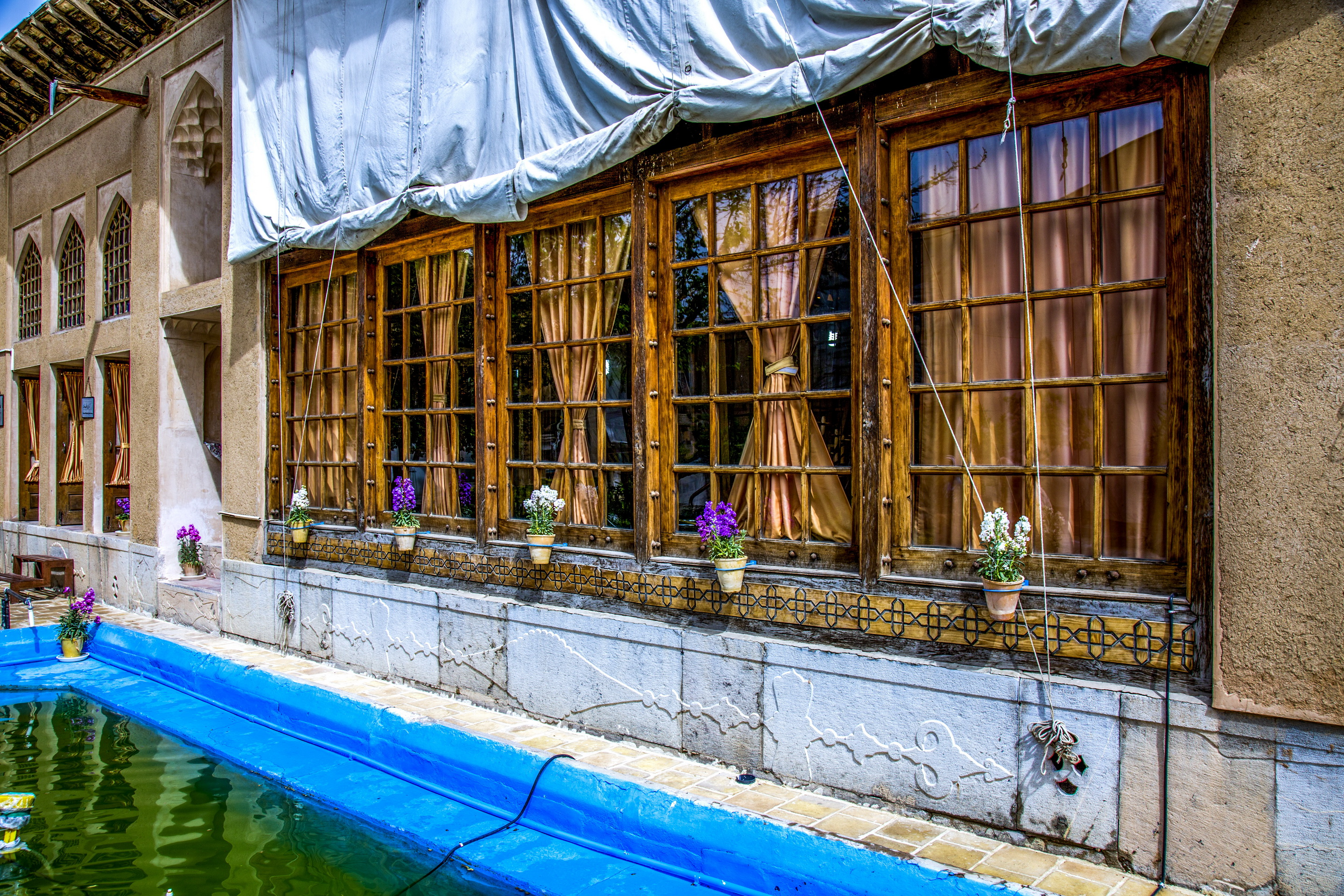
