= Zakaria ibn Idris Ash'ari Qomi =

Scholar of hadith from 8th century

- زکریا بن ادریس اشعری قمی
- Born: probably in the early 8th century
- Burial place: Sheikhan cemetery
- Occupations: Teacher, scholar of hadith
- Known for: Abu Jarir
- Parent: Idris ibn Abdullah Ash'ari (father)
- Relatives: Zakaria ibn Adam Ash'ari (cousin)

Zakaria ibn Idris Ash'ari Qomi or Zakaria ibn Idris ibn Abd-Allah al-Ash'ari al-Qomi (Persian: زکریا بن ادریس اشعری قمی, Arabic: زکریا بن إدریس بن عبدالله الأشعري القمي), known as Abu Jarir (Persian: ابو جریر), was a Shia Muhaddith (scholar of hadith) and one of the companions of Jaʿfar ibn Muḥammad aṣ-Ṣādiq (the sixth Shiite leader), Musa ibn Ja'far al-Kadhim (the seventh Shiite leader), and Ali ibn Musa al-Ridha (the eighth Shiite leader). A group of Shiite elders have considered him one of the influential people in the growth of Islam. Shaykh Tusi, while counting about 3300 narrators and companions of Jaʿfar ibn Muḥammad aṣ-Ṣādiq, has mentioned Zakaria al-Ash'ari.

== Genealogy ==
"Zakaria ibn Idris Ash'ari Qomi" is from the "Al-Ashari" family. His father is "Idris ibn Abdullah", whom Najashi called him a trustworthy person and mentioned a book by him. "Zakaria ibn Idris 's" exact date of birth is not available, probably in the early 8th century.

== Scholar of hadith ==
Shaykh Tusi in his book "Rejal Tusi" has considered "Zakaria ibn Idris Ash'ari Qomi" as one of the companions of Jaʿfar ibn Muḥammad aṣ-Ṣādiq, Musa ibn Ja'far al-Kadhim and Ali ibn Musa al-Ridha (Shia Imams). "Zakaria ibn Idris Ash'ari Qomi" has narrated several hadiths from these Shia Imams. Also, a correspondence has been narrated from him with Musa ibn Ja'far al-Kadhim about an Islamic jurisprudential issue.

After the martyrdom of Musa ibn Ja'far al-Kadhim and the emergence of the Waqifite sect, "Zakaria ibn Idris" went to Ali ibn Musa al-Ridha to investigate the matter of Imamate to ensure he is the head of the madhhab (school of thought).

According to Najashi, "Zakaria ibn Idris" had a book on hadith subject.

== Bibliography ==
"Zakaria ibn Idris Ash'ari Qomi", in addition to training outstanding and powerful students, also wrote books. Shaykh Tusi and Najashi have listed only one book in his name, and Agha Bozorg Tehrani has mentioned it in "Az-Zaree'a" under the title "Kitab al-Hadith" (Arabic: کتاب الحدیث).

== Demise ==
There is no record of the exact time of his death; but most likely at the end of the 2nd century AH (late eighth or early ninth century AD) and that he died in the city of Qom. He is buried in Sheikhan cemetery next to the grave of his cousin "Zakaria ibn Adam Ash'ari Qomi" in Qom, Iran.

Some have written that Ali ibn Musa al-Ridha after "Zakaria ibn Idris's" death, inquired about him and asked for mercy for him.

== See also ==
- Ahmad ibn Ishaq Ash'ari Qomi
- Zakaria ibn Adam Ash'ari Qomi
- Abu Hamza al-Thumali
- Safwan ibn Yahya
- Seyyed Mohammad Hojjat Kooh Kamari
- Muhammad Baqir Sharif Tabatabae
- Mohammad ibn Umar Kashshi
- Mirza Abolghasem Gilani
- Agha Hossein Khansari
- List of Shia hadith scholars
