= Anjoman-e Safakhaneh =

Isfahan, Iran location

Anjoman-e Safakhaneh انجمن صفاخانه
- Country: Iran
- City: Isfahan
- Area: Julfa
- Founder: Haj Aqa Nourollah

Anjoman-e Safakhaneh was situated in Isfahan's Julfa area (Isfahan Armenian neighborhood) located south of Isfahan. This location has been the site of religious debate. It was founded by Agha Najafi Esfahani and Haj Aqa Nourollah Najafi Isfahani in 1902. The Christian missionaries and representatives of the Muslims used to discuss there. This place was one of the first centers of conversation between religions and cultures.

Anjoman-e Safakhaneh is considered by some to be one of the first structured places designed for the discussion of religion. Haj Agha Nurollah Najafi, a prominent and influential cleric of Isfahan's constitution ordered its construction in the years before the Persian Constitutional Revolution in the Jolfa neighborhood of Isfahan to counter Christian propaganda against Islam at that time. Anjoman-e Safakhaneh was a safe place for scientific, rational, and religious debate. It offered discussion without insult.

== History ==
Christian missionaries who had traveled from Europe to India learned Persian, and published books against Islam came to Isfahan and began a struggle against Islam. Their leader was called Tizdal. He took up residence in the Jolfa neighborhood of Isfahan and invited scholars of Isfahan to debate. He published a book on the rejection of Islam called Janabi al-Islam. Agha Najafi Esfahani and Haj Aqa Nourollah tried to argue with them. In cooperation with Roknolmolk Shirazi, Dai-al-Islam was appointed to discuss them. While electing one person to debate Christianity's ideas and missionaries, Isfahan scholars, led by Agha Najafi Isfahani and Haj Agha Nourollah, formed a community called the Safakhaneh association in the Jolfa neighborhood.

== Al-Islam magazine ==
The first issue of Al-Islam was published three months after the establishment of the Anjoman-e Safakhaneh, in September 1903. The magazine published the work of the Anjoman-e Safakhaneh. The magazine described the debate between Shia scholars and Christian missionaries. It was widely used by Muslim thinkers to confront Christianity and other religions. This magazine was published by the editor of Mohammad Ali Da'i al-Islam, and its publication was sent to other cities and countries such as Egypt, India, Hejaz and Ottoman Empire, even to Muslims living in Europe. They used it to prove the power of Islamic reasoning and rationality. The publication of Al-Islam in the second decade in Persian and Urdu created a new wave of coexistence and rational dialogue between Islam and other religions.

== Anjoman-e Safakhaneh ==
The significance of the Safakhaneh association stems from the fact that it was formed to confront the negative propaganda from Tizdal and another group of Christian preachers. Ayatollah Najafi preferred to treat them with respect and courtesy.

== See also ==
- Isfahan National Holy Association
- Central Society
- Constitutional Revolution's Associations
- Mokhadarat Vatan Association
- Moqim va Mosafer
- Revolutionary Committee (Persia)
- Recapture of Isfahan
- Secret Center
- Secret Society (Persia)
- Shabnameh
- Society of Humanity
- National Consultative Assembly
