= Isfahan National Holy Association =

Isfahan National Holy Association Persian: انجمن مقدس ملی اصفهان
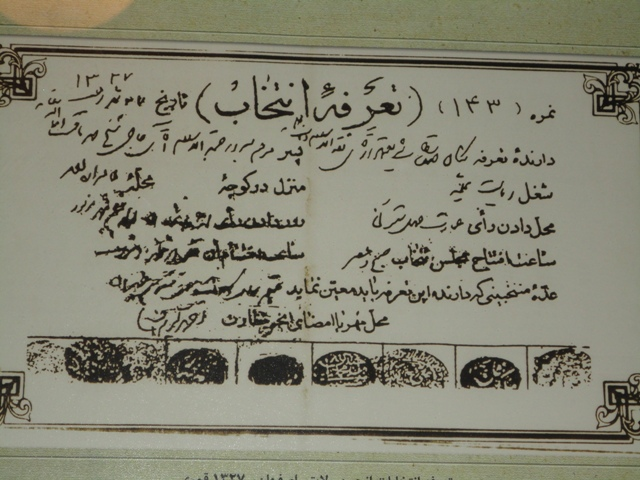
- Tariff of Election of Isfahan National Holy Society
- Formation: 1906
- Dissolved: 1908
- Type: Main political and decision-making bureau of Isfahan
- Location: Isfahan, Iran
- Presided by: Nurollah Najafi Isfahani

The Isfahan National Holy Association (1906 - 1908) was the main political and decision-making bureau of Isfahan, Iran during the first Persian Constitutional Revolution period. The members of the council were elected by the people of Isfahan and Nurollah Najafi Isfahani chaired the council. The association was formed between years 1906 and 1908, namely from the migration of Qom to the 1908 bombardment of the Majlis at the Fort of Chehel Sotoun in Isfahan.

== History ==
Following the Persian Constitutional Revolution, the people of Isfahan were able to expel Mass'oud Mirza Zell-e Soltan from Isfahan by pursuing their protests and rallies led by Aqa Najafi Isfahani. After that, the Isfahan National Holy Association was responsible of Isfahan city administration, whose members were elected by the people through free elections.

== Members ==
Members of the Isfahan National Holy Association were:

- Haj Agha Nourollah Najafi Isfahani, Seyed Abolghasem Zanjani and Sheikh Morteza Rizi from the Ulama guild election
- Mohammad Ibrahim Malek al-Tojjar and Mohammad Hussein Kazerouni from the trade union election
- Hassan Bonakdar and Mahmoud Bonakdar from guild class election
- Mirza Mohammad Ali Kalbasi and Hassan Modarres from the mullahs guild election
- Mirza Ali Akbar Sheikh al-Islam

== Actions ==
Among the features of the Isfahan National Holy Association and the important actions of its founding clerics are the following:

- Extensive and unparalleled mobilization of the people to support the goals of the Persian Constitutional Revolution
- The establishment of dozens of political and provincial associations
- Efforts to be accountable public officials and spreading the spirit of rational inquiry
- Effective measures to reform military, financial, commercial, regional welfare and economic services
- Efforts to establish new social institutions such as new banks and schools

Factor that caused tension in the relationship between the National Consultative Assembly and the Isfahan National Holy Association was the issue of the entry of the former ruler into the Isfahan and the serious opposition of the people and the Isfahan National Holy Association. This was despite the National Consultative Assembly strong request.

== Isfahan National Holy Association Newspaper ==
The newspaper of the Isfahan National Holy Association was published 15 days after the formation of the Association on 5 January 1907, reflecting the summary of the negotiations of the members of the Association. Expressing the principles of constitutionality and citing urban events was the focus of this newspaper's articles. Serajuddin Jebel Ameli Mousavi was the editor of this newspaper. The first 78 volume of this newspaper was published in the Isfahan by Mohammad Ali Chelunger efforts, sponsored by Isfahan Recreational Cultural Organization.

The subtle point in the headline of this newspaper is the conversion of Gregorian calendar to Solar Hijri calendar without mentioning the Iranian months. This change may be seen as a reaction to the foreigners and honoring the National Iranian calendar, which was undoubtedly due to the growing nationalism among Iranian people. The same attitude prompted the British Embassy's secretary to report to his country about two Isfahan newspapers (the Isfahan National Holy Association newspaper and the Jahade Akbar newspaper), especially those who spoke out against foreigners.

== See also ==
- Anjoman-e Safakhaneh
- Tarikhe Dokhanieh
- Constitutional Revolution's Associations
- Persian Constitutional Revolution
- Women's Freedom Association
- Jam'iyat-e Nesvan-e Vatankhah
- Women in Constitutional Revolution
- Mokhadarat Vatan Association
- Central Society
- Moqim va Mosafer
- Revolutionary Committee (Persia)
- Recapture of Isfahan
- Secret Center
- Secret Society (Persia)
- Shabnameh
- Society of Humanity
- National Consultative Assembly
