= Moqim va Mosafer =

Iranian political treatise (1909)

Moqim va Mosafer (transl. Conversations of the Resident and the Traveler)
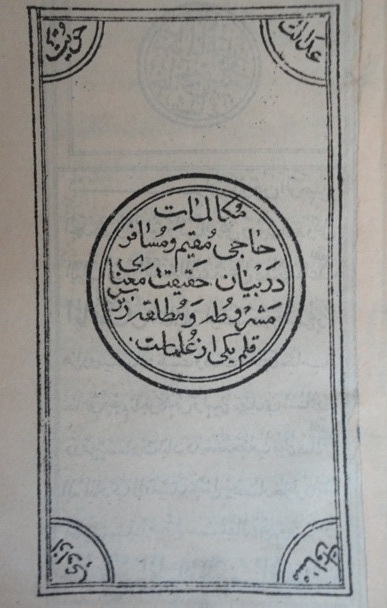
- Lithography of Moqim va Mosafer treatise
- Author: Haj Aqa Nourollah Najafi Isfahani (Persian: حاج آقا نورالله نجفی اصفهانی)
- Original title: رساله مقیم و مسافر
- Language: Persian
- Subject: Political philosophy, Political jurisprudence
- Publication date: 1909 AD (1327 AH, 1288 SH)
- Publication place: Iran

Mokalemate Moqim va Mosafer (Persian: مکالمات مقیم و مسافر, lit. 'Conversations of the Resident and the Traveler') is a political treatise by Noorollah Najafi Isfahani. The treatise was published in Isfahan in July 1909. It was written in the years between the first and the second Persian Constitutional Revolution. In this treatise, the author presents an Islamic version of the constitutional political system. The treatise Moqim va Mosafer, which was written in constitutional history, took a prominent place in its political treatises and explored the concept of constitutional jurisprudence with the idea of a "powerful government". The treatise Moqim va Mosafer proved by the powerful principle that injustice of the constitutional state are less than monarchy and almost controllable; yet it believes that if the constitution leads to mass despotism, there will be a great deal of tyranny that cannot be easily reformed.

On the first page of the book, in the four corners of the page, are the words justice, dignity, equality and freedom.

== The subject ==
The content of this book is about the intellectual defense of some kind of religious reading of the constitution and the author has sought to answer the questions of the parliamentary and constitutional system. This book is a theoretical design in form of a discussion. During the book, an informed constitutionalist discuss with an informed theocrat and finally the constitutionalist responds to the theocrat's criticism then he decides to testify on the constitutional necessity. This book is considered as the headline of religious democracy. In this treatise, Nourollah Najafi Esfahani seeks to answer the questions of the constitutional opponents who were either against authoritarianism or from a religious point of view, opposed to the constitution, or opposed the constitutional movements seeking extremism.

At the same time as writing this book, Muhammad Hossein Naini wrote his most famous religious work, the treatise Tanbihal Omma va Tanzihal Mellah in defense of the constitution.

== The writing style ==
The style of the book, which is based on dialogue, is a question-and-answer format that is new in its kind and tells the delicate taste of the author who is a aware Mujtahid of the time. In this dissertation, Haj Aqa Nourollah as the "traveler" (Mosafer) who represents a religious constitutionalist, with "Haji Moghim" (the Resident) representing religious figures who were pessimistic about the constitutionalism of some constitutionalists, with the presence of an observer named "Mirza Hedayatollah", he sat in an imaginary conversation about the government and the constitutional system.

At the end of this thesis we read:

                "The first volume of the book is finished with felicity and blessing."[4][6]

This phrase indicates that other volumes were either written or intended to be written, but no other volumes have been found so far.

The main source of Hajj Aga Nourollah's political thought is the Moqim va Mosafer treatise. The Moqim va Mosafer treatise is the most documented text that can illustrate the political thought of the Isfahan Seminary in the constitutional era. This treatise is similar to the philosophical-jurisprudential treatise of Tanbihal Omma va Tanzihal Mellah, which was also written in explaining the Islamic constitution and the state from the Islamic point of view in years between the first and the second Persian Constitutional Revolution. In this book, Hajj Aga Nourollah acted like Muhammad Hossein Naini in writing the Tanbihal Omma va Tanzihal Mellah treatise, but in simple terms, presents an Islamic version of the constitutional political system.

== Documentation principle ==
Among the points that the author has used in this dissertation is the principle of documenting and citing numerous evidences in various disciplines, so these increased text richness that informs the reader unlike the constitutional claims, the author is familiar with the issues of this affairs; for example, in expressing the constitutional emphasis from Marja's of Hawza Najaf, he mentions each of their ruling about it or in trying to express the difference between constitutionalists and tyrants in each case, he cite an example of the tyranny of the Iranian society.

== Moving from superstructure to analysis of fundamentals and assumptions ==
The author does not restrict the scope of his arguments and content to supersensitive topics; rather, he extends them to infrastructural analysis and theoretical presuppositions.

In the text of the book, the character "Moqim" goes beyond criticism of "political thought" to analysis of "political philosophy" when some peoples denounces the constitutionalism on the grounds that "constitutionalism is something new and unprecedented in Islam". From this approach the character "Moqim" shows, constitutionalism was not only invented by Europeans but rooted in Islam and religious principles; For this reason:

                            "The constitution is the same as Islam and Islam is the constitution, and constitutionalism is Islamism."[7][8][4][6]

Accordingly, the theoretical presuppositions of the topics have also been critically and elaborated in this thesis.

== See also ==
- Sheikh Fazlollah Noori
- Muhammad Hossein Naini
- Anjoman-e Safakhaneh
- Tarikhe Dokhanieh
- Constitutional Revolution's Associations
- Persian Constitutional Revolution
- Women in the Persian Constitutional Revolution
- Night letter
- Isfahan National Holy Association
