= Elections in Afghanistan =

Though Afghanistan has had democratic elections throughout the 20th century, the electoral institutions have varied as changes in the political regime have disrupted political continuity. Elections were last held under the Islamic Republic of Afghanistan, which was deposed by the Taliban in August 2021. The Taliban dissolved the Elections Commission in December 2021. In May 2022, when asked if the Taliban would hold elections, First Deputy Leader Sirajuddin Haqqani said the question was "premature". All political parties have been banned since August 2023.

== Kingdom of Afghanistan ==
=== 1949 ===
In 1949, Afghan Prime Minister Shah Mahmud Khan allowed relatively free national assembly elections, and the resulting seventh Afghan Parliament (1949–1951), which has become known as the "Liberal Parliament", gave voice to criticism of the government and traditional institutions, allowed opposition political groups to come to life, and enacted some liberal reforms, including laws providing for a free press. This being the seventh parliament, six must have been elected from 1924 to around 1945.

=== 1952 ===
The Afghan parliamentary election in 1952 was considered a step backward from the one in 1949. It occurred in the wake of a government crackdown in 1951.

=== 1964 ===
In 1964, King Mohammed Zahir Shah ordered the convening of a Loya jirga - a national gathering that included the members of the National Assembly, the Senate, the Supreme Court, and both constitutional commissions - to draft and approve a new Afghan constitution. This was the first election where women participated, since women's suffrage was introduced in Afghanistan in 1964.

167 members of the assembly were elected by the provinces, and 34 members were appointed directly by the king. Although most of the 452 people (including six women) assembled were predominantly officials who could be expected to support the royal line, the Loya Jirga of September 1964 also included members elected from the entire nation. While the government did screen out many potential dissidents, "on the whole ... delegates to the Loya Jirgah appeared to represent the full range of social, political, and religious opinion."

=== 1965 ===
Most observers described the 1965 election as remarkably fair despite difficulties such as widespread illiteracy, low voter turnout, lack of political parties, and attempts by some government officials to influence the results. The 216-member Wolesi Jirga, the lower house of parliament, included representation by anti-royalists, supporters of the king, Pashtun nationalists, both the left and right of the political spectrum, entrepreneurs and industrialists, political liberals, a small leftist group, as well as conservative Muslim leaders who still opposed secularization. This was Afghanistan's 12th parliament, so there must have been three more National Assembly elections in 1955–62.

=== 1969 ===
The 1969 parliamentary elections, with voter turnout not much higher than in 1965, produced a parliament that more or less reflected the distribution of power and population of rural Afghanistan - conservative landowners and businessmen predominated, and many more non-Pashtuns were elected than in the previous legislature. Most of the urban liberals and all female delegates lost their seats. Few leftists were in the new 13th parliament, although Babrak Karmal and Hafizullah Amin (a mathematics teacher educated in the United States) were elected from districts in and near the capital Kabul.

== Democratic Republic of Afghanistan (1978–1992) ==
=== 1987 ===
In 1987, the Soviet-backed Afghan communist government introduced a law permitting the formation of other political parties, announced that it would be prepared to share power with representatives of opposition groups in the event of a coalition government, and issued a new constitution providing for a new bicameral National Assembly (Meli Shura), consisting of a Senate (Sena) and a House of Representatives (Wolesi Jirga), and a president to be indirectly elected to a 7-year term.

Local elections were held throughout the country in August 1987, with a considerable number of the elected representatives reported to be non-PDPA members. On 30 September, Mohammad Najibullah was unanimously elected as President of the Revolutionary Council. In November 1987, a Loya jirga unanimously elected Najibullah as President of the State.

=== 1988 ===
In April 1988, elections were held for both houses of the new National Assembly. The People's Democratic Party of Afghanistan (PDPA) won 46 seats in the House of Representatives and controlled the government with support from the National Front, which won 45 seats, and from various newly recognized left-wing parties, which had won a total of 24 seats. Although the election was boycotted by the Mujahideen, the government left 50 of the 234 seats in the House of Representatives, as well as a small number of seats in the Senate, vacant in the hope that the guerrillas would end their armed struggle and participate in the government.

== Islamic State of Afghanistan ==
=== 1992 ===
Following the withdrawal of Soviet troops and the ouster of the communist government in April 1992, an indirect election for president took place in December 1992. An interim government, headed by a prime minister, was formed in June 1993.

== Islamic Republic of Afghanistan (2003–2021) ==
Due to the largely illiterate nature of Afghan society, ballots during the Islamic Republic of Afghanistan-era displayed images of the candidates, each of whom was also represented by a symbol of their choosing. Conservative Pashtun districts used a "proxy" system to register women voters, which was particularly susceptible to fraud.

=== 2004 ===
Under the 2001 Bonn Agreement, Afghanistan was scheduled to hold presidential and parliamentary elections in 2004 in order to replace the transitional government led by American-backed Hamid Karzai since his appointment in December 2001. Presidential elections were held in 2004, but parliamentary elections were not held until mid-September 2005. Hamid Karzai won the election with 55.4% of the votes and three times more votes than any other candidate.

=== 2005 ===
Afghanistan held parliamentary and provincial council elections on 18 September 2005. Final results were delayed by accusations of election fraud, and were finally announced on 12 November 2005.

Former warlords and their followers gained the majority of seats in both the lower house and the provincial council (which elects the members of the upper house). Women won 28% of the seats in the lower house, six more than the 25% guaranteed in the 2004 Constitution.

Turnout was estimated at 50%, substantially lower than at the presidential election in October 2004. This was blamed on the lack of identifiable party lists as a result of Afghanistan's new electoral law, which left voters in many cases unclear on who they were voting for.

=== 2009 ===
The Afghan presidential and provincial council elections held on 20 August 2009 were widely characterized as marred by lack of security, violence, extremely low voter turnout, and widespread ballot stuffing, intimidation, and other electoral fraud. Over 2,800 complaints were received by the Election Complaints Commission, with the largest proportion concerning irregularities at the poll, including ballot box stuffing and voter intimidation. The New York Times wrote, "fraud was so pervasive that nearly a quarter of all votes were thrown out." According to an article by The Times, "some 1.26 million recorded votes were excluded from an election that cost the international community more than $300 million." and another estimate placed the cost at $500 million.

Official election monitors and the UN placed voter turnout in the August 20 first round of the election at only around 30-33%.

On October 20, 2009, under heavy U.S. and ally pressure, President Hamid Karzai announced his acquiescence to a run-off vote between himself and his main rival, Abdullah Abdullah, to be held on 7 November. Finally on 1 November, however, Abdullah announced that he would no longer be participating in the run-off because his demands for changes in the electoral commission had not been met, and a "transparent election is not possible." A day later, on 2 November 2009, officials of the very same election commission cancelled the run-off and declared Hamid Karzai as President of Afghanistan for another 5-year term. According to The New York Times, the Afghan election commission and Karzai had been under intense pressure from the United States and its allies to cancel the run-off. Abdullah said the appointment had "no legal basis" and Afghans deserved a better government.

=== 2010 ===
The next parliamentary elections were held on 18 September 2010. In July 2010, Staffan de Mistura, the U.N. secretary-general's special representative for Afghanistan and head of the U.N. Assistance Mission in Afghanistan (UNAMA), described these as the "mother of all issues" elections. "They will not be Swiss elections, they are going to be Afghan elections," he said, suggesting the event might not fit the Western definition of democracy. More than 2,600 candidates, including more than 400 women, are running for office.

During the run-up to the elections in September 2010, the Taliban intimidated villagers in certain areas from voting. People in the villages would not vote because the Taliban left night letters warning they will cut off the finger of anyone if they find it marked with the indelible ink used to prevent multiple voting.

In late November 2010, Afghanistan's election commission disqualified 21 candidates from the 18 September parliamentary elections for alleged fraudulent activities, a spokesman said. 19 of the candidates were winning or leading their races, according to partial election results, while two others had failed to win seats.

=== 2014 ===
A presidential election was held in Afghanistan on 5 April 2014. Incumbent president Hamid Karzai was not eligible to run due to term limits. An initial field of 27 candidates was whittled down to 8 with front runners Abdullah Abdullah and Ashraf Ghani. Fraud allegations tainting the final result resulted in a recount of votes at 1,900 of the 23,000 polling stations. Ghani was eventually declared the winner in September 2014.

=== 2018 ===
Parliamentary elections were held on 20 October 2018 to elect members of the House of the People. They had originally been scheduled for 15 October 2016, but were initially postponed to 7 July 2018, and then again to 20 October. Much of the prelude to the elections focused on the debate over reforming the country's electoral laws. The new Parliament was later inaugurated on 26 April 2019.

== See also ==
- Electoral calendar
- Electoral system
