= Taliban propaganda =

Public relations tool used by the Taliban

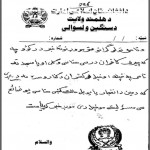
A Taliban "night letter" discouraging cooperation with foreign forces.

Since the 2001 fall of their national government in Afghanistan, Taliban propaganda has developed into a sophisticated public relations machine that is shaping perceptions in Afghanistan and abroad. Although polls show the movement remains unpopular, the insurgents have readily exploited a sense of growing alienation fostered by years of broken government promises, official corruption, and the rising death toll among civilians from airstrikes and other military actions. "The result is weakening public support for nation-building, even though few actively support the Taliban," says a report from the International Crisis Group, a think tank that monitors conflicts. An American official in Afghanistan agrees: "We cannot afford to be passive [communicators] any longer if we're going to turn this around."

Thomas Howard Johnson, who served as the American Special Envoy to Afghanistan (1989–92), says that "nearly the entire propaganda production platform for the Taliban’s information campaign carried out inside Afghanistan is located in Pakistan and overseen by ISI", including the magazines Al Somood, In Fight, Shahamat, Elhan, Murchal, the monthly pamphlet Srak and media studios and video production facilities of Alemarah, al Hijirat and Mana-ul Jihad. It was often alleged that there has been a great deal of help coming from the Pakistan's ISI (Inter–State Services). After the Fall of Kabul in August 2021, the Taliban have introduced a new propaganda in Afghanistan.

== Background ==
=== Post-9/11 ===
Early Taliban post-December 2001 media efforts were limited and cautious, reflecting the precarious nature of their position. The first media spokesman appointed after the collapse of the regime was Abdul Latif Hakimi. When Pakistani authorities arrested Hakimi on 4 October 2005, he was replaced by as many as three successors. One of these new spokesmen, Muhammad Hanif, was himself arrested in January 2007. The main aim of Taliban media activities during this time was to publicize, in an often exaggerated fashion, Taliban operations undertaken in Afghanistan. This was achieved mainly through contact with Pakistani or international press, usually through radio, telephone or newspapers.

== Strategy ==
The Afghan and Pakistani branches of Taliban have different aims and objective, but they share similar propaganda narratives. Taliban propaganda frames the war in Afghanistan as part of a "clash of civilizations", and it often emphasizes the history of wars between Christians and Muslims. In the Taliban's view, the Western world is fundamentally hostile to Islam, and the larger war on terror is in fact a war on Islam. The coalition forces are depicted as "occupiers", "foreigners", and "invaders" who want to crush Islam and turn Afghanistan into a Christian country. The group also tends to dismiss the coalition forces as weak and on the verge of collapse.

Taliban propaganda often portrays the government of Hamid Karzai as morally bankrupt minions of the United States. For example, a press release from August 2010, promulgated after a Washington Post report describing ties between the Central Intelligence Agency and Karzai's aides, called the Karzai government a "puppet multidimensional administration whose members are morally, politically and financially corrupt".

In October of 2010, the Taliban began portraying themselves as a viable alternative to the Karzai government, promising to promote transparency and reduce corruption. Unusually, they also claimed they would respect the rights of women. An anonymous intelligence official interviewed by The Washington Post speculated this may have been a reaction to a story from Time magazine about a woman who was mutilated by the Taliban.

=== Village-level ===
When the Taliban attempt to rally rural people within Afghanistan to their cause, they will often characterize the coalition as an army of "occupiers" who want to destroy Islam, typically by citing various Islamic texts and certain fatwas. Those who support the coalition and the Karzai administration are portrayed as betraying Islam, while those who oppose them and support the Taliban are seen as fulfilling a holy duty to defend the faith. If a village leader or group of village dwellers provide aid to the Karzai government or the coalition, the Taliban will typically send them threatening letters to sway them into withdrawing support.

== Effectiveness ==
The Taliban know how to take advantage of Western media outlets. For instance, on Aug. 18, the Taliban ambushed a French patrol about 30 miles from the Afghan capital, an attack that left 10 soldiers dead. Several weeks later, militants involved in the attack appeared in a glossy, eight-page magazine spread in Paris-Match, a leading French newsweekly, flaunting the weapons, uniforms and personal effects of the dead soldiers. Back in France, support for the war dropped to a new low. Defense Minister Herve Morin noted that the Taliban "understood that public opinion is probably the Achilles' heel" of the international community.

== Structure ==
In addition to regional military commands, the Afghan Taliban have 10 committees that deal with different aspects of government. One of these committees, Culture and Information, handles propaganda. Maulvi Qudratullah Jamal, a known member of the Quetta Shura, served as chief of the committee from 2002 to 2005. In 2010, it was led by Amir Khan Muttaqi, another member of the Quetta Shura.

=== Spokesmen ===
With exception of the group's first full-time spokesman, Mufti Latifullah Hakimi, all Taliban spokesmen are appointed by Mullah Omar himself via formal decree. The Taliban originally had only one spokesman, but after Hakimi was arrested in October 2005, the number was increased to two. One spokesman handles media affairs for the southern and western provinces (meaning Kandahar, Zabul, Oruzgan, Helmand, Herat, Nimroz, Farah, Badghis, Ghor and Sar-e-Pul), while the other covers eastern, central and northern provinces (Badakhshan, Baghlan, Balkh, Bamiyan, Daykundi, Faryab, Ghazni, Jowzjan, Kabul, Kapisa, Khost, Kunar, Kunduz, Laghman, Logar, Nangrahar, Nuristan, Paktia, Paktika, Panjsher, Parwan, Samangan, Takhar, and Wardak). In 2010, the former position was occupied by Qari Mohammad Yousuf Ahmadi and the latter by Zabihullah Mujahid.

These spokesmen further the Taliban's propaganda efforts by promoting the Taliban view of the war to the wider world and offering an counter-narrative that undermines the legitimacy of the Karzai administration. They are generally reluctant to divulge exact details about Taliban casualties, tactics, and commanders, but are very eager to share claims of Taliban successes, take responsibility for attacks, and refute claims made by the coalition and Karzai government. It is often easier to obtain information from a Taliban spokesman than it is with a coalition or government spokesman. Many of these spokesmen post press statements on Taliban websites, in multiple languages, and they often actively send out stories to the media via text, phone, email, and fax. They sometimes change their numbers to avoid being tracked by counterinsurgency forces, but nevertheless, they are often reachable via phone. Some even use Internet forums.

Some groups within the Taliban, such as the Salafi (Wahhabi) Taliban in Nuristan and east Kunar, the Tora Bora Military Front in Nangrahar, and the Haqqani Network in Khost, Paktia, and Paktika, have their own spokesmen, who act separately from the spokesmen who represent the Taliban as a whole. Mullah Dadullah also had his own spokesman, despite being a member of the Taliban's main governing council.

== Media ==
The Taliban generally disseminate propaganda using decentralized, conventional methods, such as leaflets and secret radio broadcasts. They have been particularly effective at preaching their messages at mosques and other public places. The coalition forces have difficulty counteracting these in-person methods, as their troops usually lack the knowledge and training to refute Taliban propagandists and often need to rely on Afghan officials. The Taliban also use newer forms of media, such as Facebook and Twitter.

=== Internet ===
According to a 2010 Huffington Post article by Abdulhadi Hairan, internet-based propaganda has been the Taliban's "fastest and the most useful propaganda tool" since the 2000s.

- Websites: The Taliban maintain their own websites, packed with news, sermons, photos, videos, audio clips, articles on conducting guerilla warfare, and press releases and statements from their various spokesmen. Many of these sites are multilingual and include information in Pashto, Dari, Arabic, Urdu, and English. They are difficult to take down, as whenever coalition agencies shut down a web site, it often resurfaces under a different name and server configuration. One such site, the "Islamic Emirate of Afghanistan" (based on the regime that ruled the country from 1996 to 2001), frequently switches service providers to avoid being shut down. A Washington Post investigation determined that it was hosted by a firm based in Houston for over a year, without the firm's knowledge. Some Taliban spokesmen also communicate with the public through Internet forums.
- Videos: Propaganda videos published on Facebook and YouTube help spread the Taliban's message to audiences and are used to attract aid and volunteers from outside Afghanistan and Pakistan. Taliban spokesmen are known for exploiting captives through propaganda such as Private Bergdahl who was captured in June 2009. Three videos of the missing private have been released, including one at Christmastime. In April 2010, a seven-minute video of the POW followed.
- Email: The Taliban frequently use email to speak with reporters and media agencies, take responsibility for attacks, provide information and clarifications, and send press releases. Taliban spokesmen are often reachable via email, and many insurgents are willing to do email interviews.

=== DVDs ===
The Taliban also disseminate propaganda videos through DVDs. Many of these cheap, mass-produced DVDs show Taliban insurgents executing enemies and conducting attacks against coalition forces. One particularly popular video features a montage of Afghan mujahideen fighting Soviet forces during the Soviet–Afghan War, in effect attempting to depict coalition forces as invaders. Other DVDs depict atrocities allegedly conducted by the coalition forces.

=== Night letters ===
The Taliban method for night letters usually entails a warning delivered under a gate or nailed to a door in the dead of night. During the run-up to the 2010 Afghan parliamentary elections, the Taliban intimidated villagers in certain areas from voting. People in the villages would not vote because the Taliban left letters at night warning they will cut off the finger of anyone if they find it marked with the election ink used to prevent multiple voting.

=== Magazines ===
Various different groups within the Taliban print their own magazines, often publishing them openly and distributing them for free in Peshawar and the adjacent areas. Some are written in Pashto, while others cater to Urdu and Arabic speakers. These magazines are generally quite biased and only include stories and articles if they support the Taliban's extremist narrative. They often feature long interviews with insurgent commanders, distorted news accounts, photos of victims, and discussions of politics and religion.

According to analyst and counterinsurgency expert Abdulhadi Hairan, many of these magazines "exploit a particular incident or issue by elevating it with seemingly related background information to provoke the local people to stand up for violence." For example, a 2010 issue of Shahamat (The Bravery), a Taliban propaganda magazine published in Pashto, describes an incident in the Maidan Wardak Province in the following terms:

The latest sad news is that the Christian Crusaders (Americans) have burned a copy of the Holy Quran in Wardak province and have thus shown their enmity with Islam and the Muslims... The saddest aspect of this incident is that the American invaders have committed this heinous crime in a province (Wardak) that has been known for long as home to mujahedeen (the holy warriors). The people of this province have taken active part in past and current jihadi movements. The people of this province have always defended their country bravely and heroically. The people of this province had played a historical role in the war against British occupiers...

Other Taliban magazines, which vary in frequency of publication, length, languages (Pashto but also Dari, Urdu and Arabic) and so on, include Al Somood (Resistance), Srak (Beam of Light), Tora Bora Magazine, In Fight, Elham (Inspiration/Revelation), Murchal (Trench), Mesaq-i-Esaar (Covenant of Sacrifice), Ihsas (Feelings), Resalat (Duty), Zamir (Conscience), Hittin, Wahdat, Nawa-I Afghan Jihad (Voice or melody of the Afghan Jihad), Likwal’ Hewad, and Khabroona.

== Counter-propaganda ==
In May 2009, Time claimed that American forces had "reportedly" launched a campaign in both Afghanistan and Pakistan to take down Taliban-affiliated websites and jam Taliban radio stations. The magazine also stated that the Afghan government had set up a $1.2 million media center, as part of an effort to fill in gaps in coverage that might be exploited by Taliban propagandists. The center was built with help from international groups and was staffed by "Western-trained spin doctors". The head of the center, Waheed Omer, told Time that his priorities were giving journalists enough positive stories to report and getting stories out quickly.
