= Dialogue Among Civilizations =

Theory of international relations

Former Iranian president Mohammad Khatami introduced the idea of Dialogue Among Civilizations as a response to Samuel P. Huntington's theory of a Clash of Civilizations. The term was initially used by Austrian philosopher Hans Köchler who in 1972, in a letter to UNESCO, had suggested the idea of an international conference on the "dialogue between different civilizations" (dialogue entre les différentes civilisations) and had organized, in 1974, a first international conference on the role of intercultural dialogue ("The Cultural Self-comprehension of Nations") with the support and under the auspices of Senegalese President Léopold Sédar Senghor.

== History ==
One of the first places where Dialogue Among Civilizations took place was in Isfahan, Iran at the Safa Khaneh Community that was established in 1902. Safa Khaneh was a place that Haj Aqa Nourollah and his older brother made. It was a place where Muslims and Christians talked about their religions with each other. It was one of the first interfaith centres in the world. Later a magazine was published based on the dialogues between Muslims and Christians in the Safa Khaneh and it was released in Iran, India and England. The founder of Safa Khaneh, Haj Aqa Nouroollah was one of the leaders of the Constitution Era in Iran. His house has become a museum named Constitution house of Isfahan.

== Introduction ==
The page dedicated to the United Nations Year of Dialog Among Civilizations introduces the idea as follows:

What is diversity? What can people do to open the lines of communication and redefine the meaning of diversity? How can we better understand diversity? What is the overall perception of diversity? These were the questions the General Assembly grappled with in 1998, when the year 2001 was announced as the United Nations Year of Dialogue Among Civilizations.

What does a dialogue among civilizations mean? One could argue that in the world there are two groups of civilizations – one which perceives diversity as a threat and the other which sees it as an opportunity and an integral component for growth. The Year of Dialogue Among Civilizations was established to redefine diversity and to improve dialogue between these two groups. Hence, the goal of the Year of Dialogue Among Civilizations is to nurture a dialogue which is both preventive of conflicts – when possible – and inclusive in nature.

To do this, Governments, the United Nations system and other relevant international and non-governmental organizations were invited by the United Nations General Assembly to plan and implement cultural, educational and social programmes to promote the concept of the dialogue among civilizations.

== The Vision ==
Here are some excerpts from the vision of the Foundation for Dialogue among Civilizations:

... The act of dialogue among cultures and civilizations faces multiple theoretical and practical questions. Fundamental questions regarding civilization and culture, and the intellectual and scientific preoccupations in this regard should not be underestimated. I would like, however, to emphasize that the main objective for this initiative of dialogue among cultures and civilizations is in fact to initiate a new paradigm in international relations and those among human beings in our contemporary world. This necessity will be clearer when we compare it with the other paradigms which currently form the basis of international relations. It is through a fundamental and structural critique of these paradigms that the raison d'être for this new paradigm is identified.

We cannot invite people and governments to the paradigm of dialogue of cultures and civilizations without learning lessons from history, without thoroughly investigating the reasons behind major world disasters in the twentieth century and their continuation in the current one, and without passing judgment on the existing dominant paradigm which is based on a dialogue of power and glorification of might.

Dialogue among civilizations, viewed from an ethical perspective, is in fact an invitation to discard what might be termed the power oriented will, in favour of a love oriented one. In this case, the result of dialogue will be empathy and compassion. And the interlocutors will primarily be thinkers, leaders, artists and all benevolent intellectuals who are the true representatives of their respective cultures and civilizations.

Relying on shared principles, objectives, and threats in order to find shared solutions is a major step towards changing the existing situation and isolating the extremists who, by sanctifying violence and force, have spoilt the world for all its inhabitants regardless of their culture or civilization. ...

== The Mission ==
Here are some excerpts from the mission of the Foundation for Dialogue among Civilizations:

... The foundation aims to build upon the successes of the United Nations year and further implement the recommendations of the relevant UN resolutions.

... The Foundation believes that dialogue among civilisations is conducive to mutual understanding, tolerance, peaceful coexistence and international cooperation and security.

Strategic objectives of the Foundation for Dialogue Among Civilisations include:

1. promoting and facilitating the peaceful resolution of conflicts and/disputes
2. reconciling tensions between cultures, countries and religions
3. promoting and facilitating the much needed dialogue between Muslim societies and other societies around the world
4. contributing to academic research and enriching the wider debate around peace in the world

Activities

The Foundation for Dialogue Among Civilisations will fulfill its objectives through:

1. the organization of diverse cultural, artistic, and scientific events including debates, fora, symposia and seminars designed to encourage exchange between cultures and civilisations in the spirit of the Foundation
2. maintaining, and when needed, initiating regular communication with experts in the field as well as with all other foundations or associations with similar or complementary objectives
3. the publication of articles and reports resulting from research carried out by the Foundation's committees and debates at its workshops

The Foundation welcomes proposals of cooperation, contribution and support by individuals and institutions with transparent activities in favour of dialogue, reconciliation and peace.

== Contrasting view: The Clash of Civilizations ==
In 1993, Huntington provoked great debate among international relations theorists with the interrogatively-titled "The Clash of Civilizations?", a controversial, oft-cited article published in Foreign Affairs magazine. Its description of post–Cold War geopolitics contrasted with the controversial End of History thesis advocated by Francis Fukuyama.

Huntington expanded "The Clash of Civilizations?" to book length and published it as The Clash of Civilizations and the Remaking of World Order in 1996. The article and the book posit that post–Cold War conflict would most frequently and violently occur because of cultural rather than ideological differences. That, whilst in the Cold War, conflict likely occurred between the Capitalist West and the Communist Bloc East, it now was most likely to occur between the world's major civilizations — identifying seven, and a possible eighth: (i) Western, (ii) Latin American, (iii) Islamic, (iv) Sinic (Chinese), (v) Hindu, (vi) Orthodox, (vii) Japanese, and (viii) the African. This cultural organization contrasts the contemporary world with the classical notion of sovereign states. To understand current and future conflict, cultural rifts must be understood, and culture — rather than the State — mern(?) nations will lose predominance if they fail to recognize the irreconcilable nature of cultural tensions.

In Eurasia the great historic fault lines between civilizations are once more aflame. This is particularly true along the boundaries of the crescent-shaped Islamic bloc of nations, from the bulge of Africa to central Asia. Violence also occurs between Muslims, on the one hand, and Orthodox Serbs in the Balkans, Jews in Israel, Hindus in India, Buddhists in Burma and Catholics in the Philippines. Islam has bloody borders.

— "The Clash of Civilizations?", original 1993 "Foreign Affairs" magazine article

Critics (for example, in Le Monde Diplomatique) called The Clash of Civilizations and the Remaking of World Order the theoretical legitimization of American-led Western aggression against China and the world's Islamic cultures. Nevertheless, this post–Cold War shift in geopolitical organization and structure requires that the West internally strengthens itself culturally, by abandoning the imposition of its ideal of democratic universalism and its incessant military interventionism. Other critics argued that Huntington's taxonomy is simplistic and arbitrary, and does not take account of the internal dynamics and partisan tensions within civilizations. Huntington's influence upon U.S. policy has been likened to that of British historian A.J. Toynbee's controversial religious theories about Asian leaders in the early twentieth century.

Personal Representative of the Secretary-General for the UN Year of Dialogue Among Civilizations has said:

History does not kill. Religion does not rape women, the purity of blood does not destroy buildings and institutions do not fail. Only individuals do those things.

Former UN Assistant Secretary-General Giandomenico Picco was appointed the Personal Representative to the Secretary-General for the United Nations Year of Dialogue Among Civilizations in 1999 in order to facilitate discussions on diversity, through organizing conferences, seminars and disseminating information and scholarly materials. Having served the United Nations for two decades, Mr. Picco is most recognized for participating in UN efforts to negotiate the Soviet withdrawal from Afghanistan and in bringing an end to the Iran-Iraq war. He believes that people should take responsibility for who they are, what they do, what they value, and what they believe in.

== Related comments ==
- "A basic change in political ethics is required for the realization of the proposal, The dialog among civilizations." (UNESCO 1999)
- "In order to understand the meaning of the phrase dialogue among civilizations as defined here, one has no choice but to closely pay attention to a number of points one of which is the relationship between a politician and an artist, and the other is the relationship between ethics and politics." (Khatami, UNESCO 1999)
- The Daniel Pearl Dialogue for Muslim-Jewish Understanding is a series of personal yet public conversations between Daniel Pearl's father, Professor Judea Pearl, President of the Daniel Pearl Foundation, and Dr. Akbar Ahmed, Chair of Islamic Studies at American University. The program grew out of Professors Ahmed and Pearl's shared concern about the deterioration of relationships between Muslim and Jewish communities around the world, and their strong belief that reconciliation between these two Abrahamic faiths can be achieved through frank and respectful dialogue. The discussions range from theological issues, historical perceptions to current events. In 2006 Professors Ahmed and Pearl were awarded the first annual Purpose Prize "in recognition of [their] simple, yet innovative approach to solving one of society's most pressing problems." Professor Judea Pearl is a well-known computer scientist, and the President of the Daniel Pearl Foundation.
- "Dear President Khatami...I welcome your call for a dialogue between Islamic and Judeo-Christian civilizations because I believe that tensions between these two great world civilizations represent the most significant foreign policy challenge for the world community as we enter the twenty-first century." Excerpt from "An American Citizen Replies" (letter by Anthony J. Dennis to Iranian President Khatami dated August 18, 2000) published in the book Letters to Khatami: A Reply To The Iranian President's Call For A Dialogue Among Civilizations. To date, this book, published and released on July 1, 2001, is the only published reply the now-former Iranian President Khatami has ever received from the West in response to Khatami's call for such a dialogue in an exclusive, hour-long interview on CNN with CNN Foreign Correspondent Christiane Amanpour broadcast in North America on January 7, 1998.

== See also ==
- Alliance of Civilizations
- Centre for Dialogue
- Dialogue of Civilizations
- Fethullah Gülen
- Institute for Interreligious Dialogue
- Interfaith dialogue
- KAICIID Dialogue Centre
- Parliament of the World's Religions
- World Against Violence and Extremism
