= 1837 in Iran =

- Decades
- See also: Other events of 1837; Years in Iran

The following lists events that happened during 1837 in Qajar era.

== Incumbents ==
- Monarch: Mohammad Shah Qajar

== Births ==
- ? – Sayyed Muhammad Tabatabei Fesharaki, shia Islam jurist.
