= 1846 in Iran =

- Decades
- See also: Other events of 1846; Years in Iran

The following lists events that happened during 1846 in the Qajar era.

== Incumbents ==
- Monarch: Mohammad Shah Qajar

== Births ==
- ? – Agha Najafi Esfahani, Iranian religious leade.
- ? – Reza Khan Arfa Danesh, Iranian diplomat and poet.

== Deaths ==
- June 18 – Abdollah Mirza Dara, Iranian poet and Qajar prince.
- ? – Vesal Shirazi, Iranian poet and calligrapher.
