= Censorship in South Asia =

Censorship in South Asia can apply to books, movies, the Internet and other media. Censorship occurs on religious, moral and political grounds, which is controversial in itself as the latter especially is seen as contrary to the tenets of democracy, in terms of freedom of speech and the right to freely criticise the government.

== Censorship by country ==
=== Bangladesh ===
In June 2006, the government of Bangladesh issued a restraining order preventing Sigma Huda, the UN's Special Rapporteur on trafficking in persons, from leaving the country to deliver a key report on trafficking before the Human Rights Council in Geneva on 11 June 2007. The U.N. High Commissioner for Human Rights Louise Arbour, 2007, asked Bangladesh to clarify corruption charges against a U.N. human rights investigator, which will prevent her from addressing the main U.N. rights body.

Selective blocking of web sites for brief periods has been reported, including:

- The Bangla blogging platform Sachalayatan during July 2008
- YouTube during March 2009
- Facebook in May 2010
- YouTube again in September 2012 was blocked for refusing to remove the controversial Innocence of Muslims movie trailer

Later these blocks were removed.

Several books of the Bangladeshi writer Taslima Nasrin have been banned in Bangladesh and West Bengal.

=== India ===
Several books that are critical of religions have been banned in India, or in parts of India, which was stated to be a precautionary measure to prevent riots or other attacks. India was the second country in the world to ban The Satanic Verses by Salman Rushdie. The book Understanding Islam through Hadis by Ram Swarup was also banned.

India is listed as engaged in selective internet filtering in the conflict/security and internet tools areas, and no evidence of filtering was found in the political and social areas by the OpenNet Initiative (ONI) in May 2007. ONI states that:

As a stable democracy with strong protections for press freedom, India’s experiments with [internet] filtering have been brought into the fold of public discourse. The selective censorship of [websites] and blogs since 2003, made even more disjointed by the non-uniform responses of [internet] service providers (ISPs), has inspired a clamor of opposition. Clearly government regulation and implementation of filtering are still evolving. … Amidst widespread speculation in the media and blogosphere about the state of filtering in India, the sites actually blocked indicate that while the filtering system in place yields inconsistent results, it nevertheless continues to be aligned with and driven by government efforts. Government attempts at filtering have not been entirely effective, as blocked content has quickly migrated to other [websites] and users have found ways to circumvent filtering. The government has also been criticized for a poor understanding of the technical feasibility of censorship and for haphazardly choosing which [websites] to block. The amended IT Act, absolving intermediaries from being responsible for third-party created content, could signal stronger government monitoring in the future.

=== Pakistan ===
The OpenNet Initiative listed internet filtering in Pakistan as "substantial" in the social and conflict/security areas, and as "selective" in the internet tools area, and as "suspected" in the political area in December 2010.

In late 2010 Pakistanis enjoyed unimpeded access to most sexual, political, social, and religious content on the internet. Although the Pakistani government does not employ a sophisticated blocking system, a limitation which has led to collateral blocks on entire domains such as Blogspot.com and YouTube.com, it continues to block websites that contain content that it considers to be blasphemous, anti-Islamic, or threatening to internal security. Pakistan has blocked access to websites that are critical of the government.

In early March 2006, the government temporarily had all websites hosted at the popular blogging service Blogger.com blocked. Millions of websites from all over the world are hosted at blogspot, along with thousands of Pakistani ones. This step by the government is possibly due to the Jyllands-Posten Muhammad cartoons controversy, as some blogspot websites put up copies of the cartoons.

=== Sri Lanka ===
Sri Lanka is listed as a country "under surveillance" by Reporters Without Borders in 2011.

Several political and news websites, including tamilnet.com and lankanewsweb.com, have been blocked within the country. Tamilnet has been producing news about the Sri Lankan civil war, focusing in the north and the east of the country, and is seen by the government as a Pro-LTTE news website. A government spokesman has said that he is looking to hire hackers to disable Tamilnet.

The Sri Lanka courts have ordered hundreds of porn sites to be blocked, stating that it is to "protect women and children". This is no longer true as of 2017.

In February of 2018, Facebook was blocked, as an effort to prevent racial-hate speech.

In October and November 2011 the Sri Lankan Telecommunication Regulatory Commission blocked the five websites, www.lankaenews.com, srilankamirror.com, srilankaguardian.com, paparacigossip9.com, and www.lankawaynews.com, for what the government alleges as publishing reports that amount to "character assassination and violating individual privacy" and damaging the character of President Mahinda Rajapaksa, ministers and senior government officials. The five sites have published material critical of the government and alleged corruption and malfeasance by politicians.

== See also ==
- Banned books
- Banned films^{All films banned as rated as "Adults Only" in Sri Lanka from August 2009. "Aksharaya" By Asoka Handagama in Sri Lanka from 2008.}
- Salman Rushdie
- Media bias in South Asia
- International Freedom of Expression Exchange
