= Abdul Latif Hakimi =

Taliban spokesman from 2001 till 2005

Mllah Abdul Latif Hakimi

Head of the Ranks Clearance Commission of Afghanistan
- Incumbent
- Assumed office 23 November 2021
- Defense Minister: Mohammad Yaqoob (acting)

Mullah Abdul Latif Hakimi, (/əbˈduːl ləˈtiːf hɑːkiˈmiː/ əb-DOOL lə-TEEF hah-kee-MEE; also known as Latif Hakimi or Hakim Latifi) was a media spokesman for the Taliban between January 2004 until his capture in October 2005 by Pakistani security forces.

== Life ==
Hakimi first claimed a suicide bombing on 28 January 2004, that killed a British soldier in Kabul, Afghanistan.

In June 2005, he confirmed that a helicopter had been shot down by insurgent fire during Operation Red Wings, killing the 16 U.S. Naval special operators and aviators aboard, representing the single largest loss of life in the Invasion for the Coalition forces at that time.

On 4 October 2005, Pakistani officials arrested Hakimi in Balochistan, Pakistan. After Hakimi's capture, Yousef Ahmadi represented the Taliban, along with Muhammad Hanif.

Hakimi was released on 18 March 2007 along with four other Taliban prisoners in exchange for the release of kidnapped Italian reporter Daniele Mastrogiacomo. Daniele was freed a day later but Daniele's driver Sayed Agha was beheaded days earlier after the Taliban claimed he was a spy. Daniele's translator Ajmal Naqshbandi was beheaded on 8 April 2007.

== See also ==
- Zabiullah Mujahid
