= Muhammad Hanif (Taliban spokesperson) =

Taliban spokesperson

Muhammad Hanif (Pashto: محمد حنيف) (d. November 2008) was a media spokesman for the Taliban from October 2005 until his capture by Afghanistan's National Directorate of Security (NDS) on January 17, 2007.

Hanif and Yousef Ahmadi were appointed in October 2005 after the previous spokesman, Latifullah Hakimi, was captured. His main tool of communication to news organizations was email. Shortly after the death of Abu Musab al-Zarqawi, Hanif reached the press by means of a satellite telephone, and read a statement about the "martyr" which he claimed was written by Mullah Omar.

On the day of his 2007 capture, Afghan intelligence officials released a recording of part of Hanif's interrogation in which Hanif tells his interrogators that the Taliban's leader Mullah Omar was staying in the Pakistani city of Quetta under the protection of the ISI, Pakistan's intelligence agency. This claim was then denied by Pakistan.

Muhammad Hanif was released from custody in 2008 as he apparently no longer had any contact with the Taliban. On November 28, 2008, it was reported that Hanif and three of his relatives were assassinated at his home in Nangarhar Province.

== See also ==
- Zabiullah Mujahid
