= Election ink =

Marker to prevent double voting

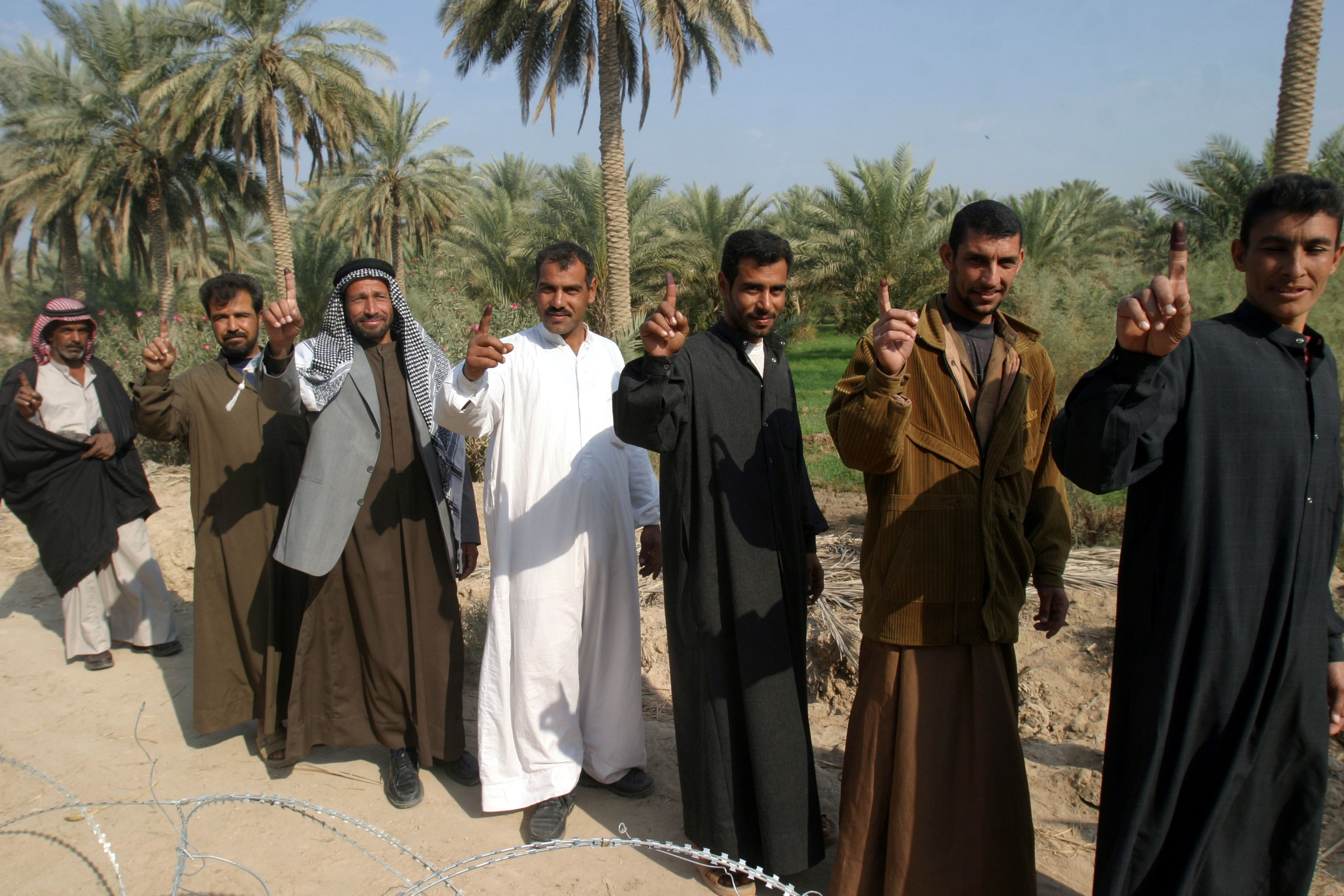
A line of voters showing their respective fingers during the 2005 Iraqi election.

Electoral ink, indelible ink, electoral stain or phosphoric ink is a semi-permanent ink or dye that is applied to the finger of voters (usually the index finger) during elections in order to prevent electoral fraud such as double voting. It is used in countries where voter identity documents have not been standardised or institutionalised. One of the more common ink is based on silver nitrate, which can produce a stain lasting several weeks. It was first used during the 1962 general election in India. The ink was developed by the National Physical Laboratory of India, a research institute under the Ministry of Science and Technology of India, and manufactured by Mysore Paints and Varnish Ltd. It is exported to more than 30 countries.

== Application ==
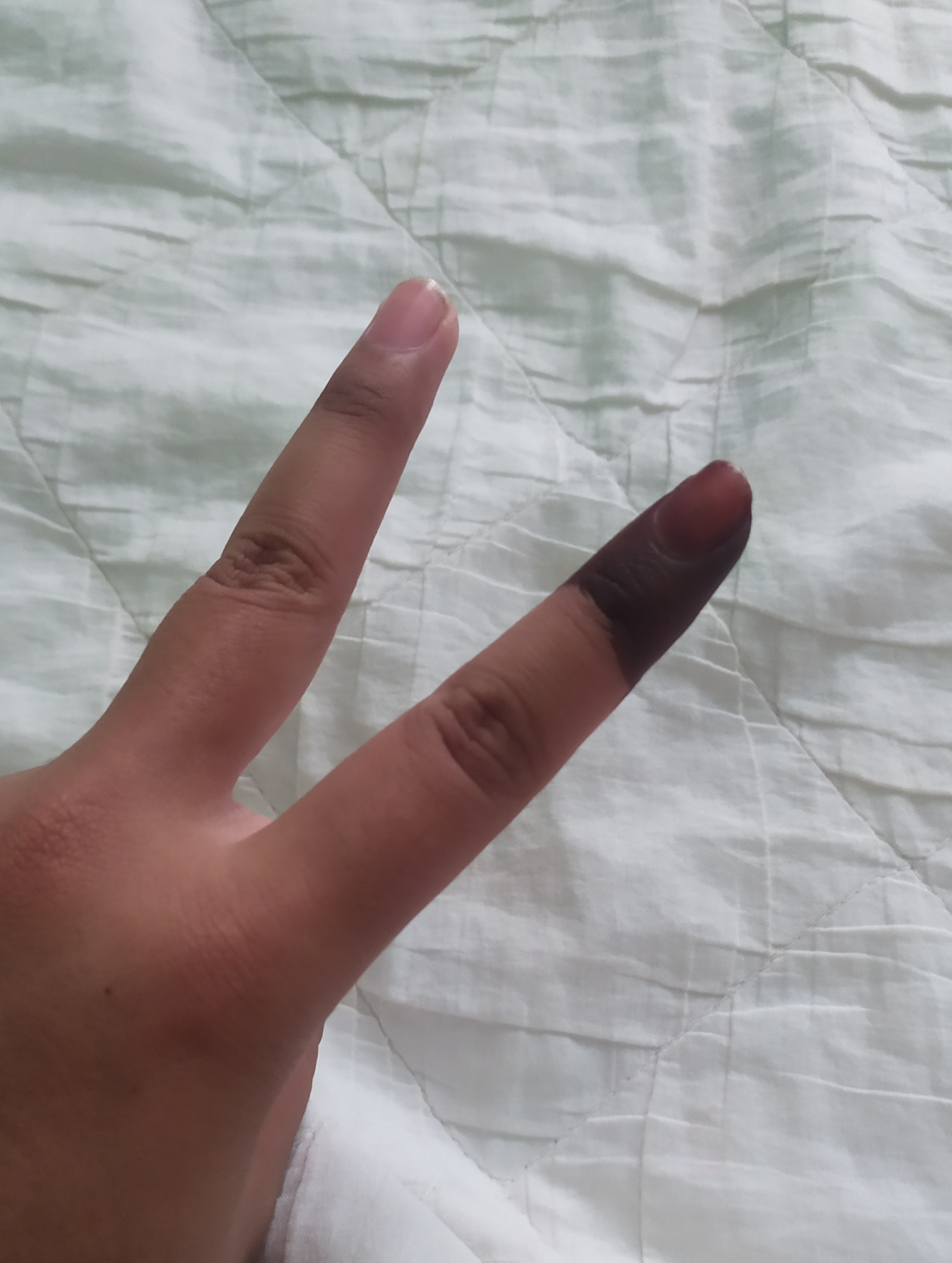
A voter's left hand index finger stained with election ink. 15th Malaysian general election.

Electoral stain is a practical security feature to prevent double voting in elections. Ink is typically applied to the left-hand thumb, over the nail and finger in a straight line, especially to the cuticle, where it is almost impossible to remove quickly. In some countries, like Sri Lanka, the ink is applied on the little finger on the left hand. Ink may be applied in various ways, depending on circumstance and preference. The most common methods are dipping bottles with sponge inserts, bottles with brush applicators, spray bottles, and marker pens.

== Composition ==
Electoral stain typically contains a pigment for instant recognition, a silver nitrate which stains the skin on exposure to ultraviolet light, leaving a mark that is impossible to wash off and is only removed as external skin cells are replaced. Industry-standard electoral inks contain 10%, 14%, or 18% silver nitrate solution, depending on when the mark must be visible. Although usually water-based, electoral stains occasionally contain a solvent such as alcohol to allow for faster drying, primarily when used with dipping bottles, which may include a biocide to ensure bacteria are not transferred from voter to voter. Hydroxides can easily remove silver chloride. Hence, other photosensitive pigmentation needs to be added. Silver nitrate can cause a condition called argyria, although this requires frequent or extreme exposure.

== Longevity ==
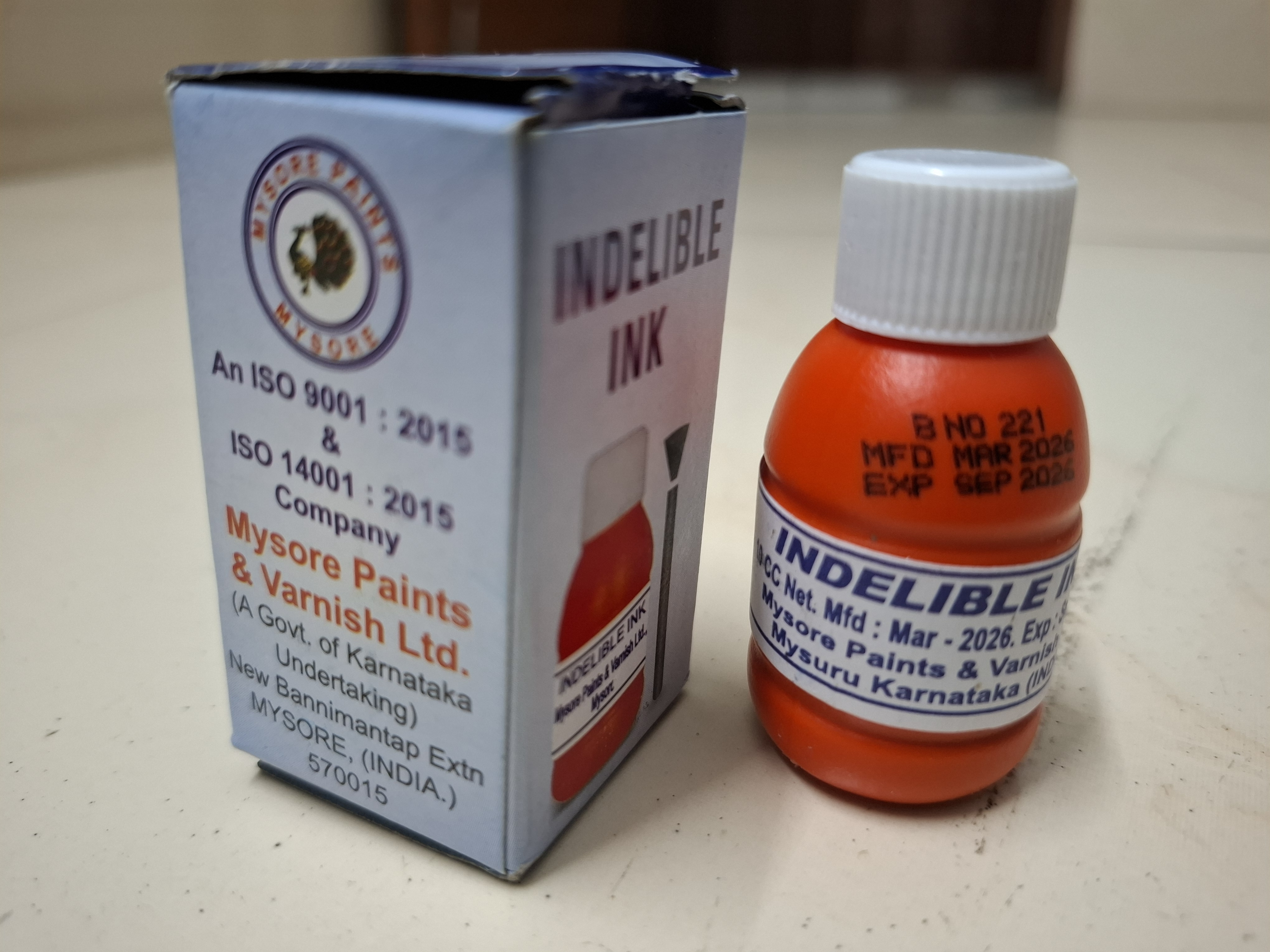
Election ink manufactured by Mysore Paints

Election stain typically stays on skin for 72–96 hours, lasting two to four weeks on the fingernail and cuticle area. The election ink used puts a permanent mark on the cuticle area, which only disappears with the growth of the new nail. It can take up to four months for the stain to be replaced completely by new nail growth. Stains with concentrations of silver nitrate higher than 18% have been found to have no added effect on stain longevity, as silver nitrate does not have a photosensitive reaction with live skin cells. This means that the stain will fade as new skin grows. Silver nitrate is an irritant and is used as a cauterizing agent at concentrations of 25% or higher.

== Colour ==
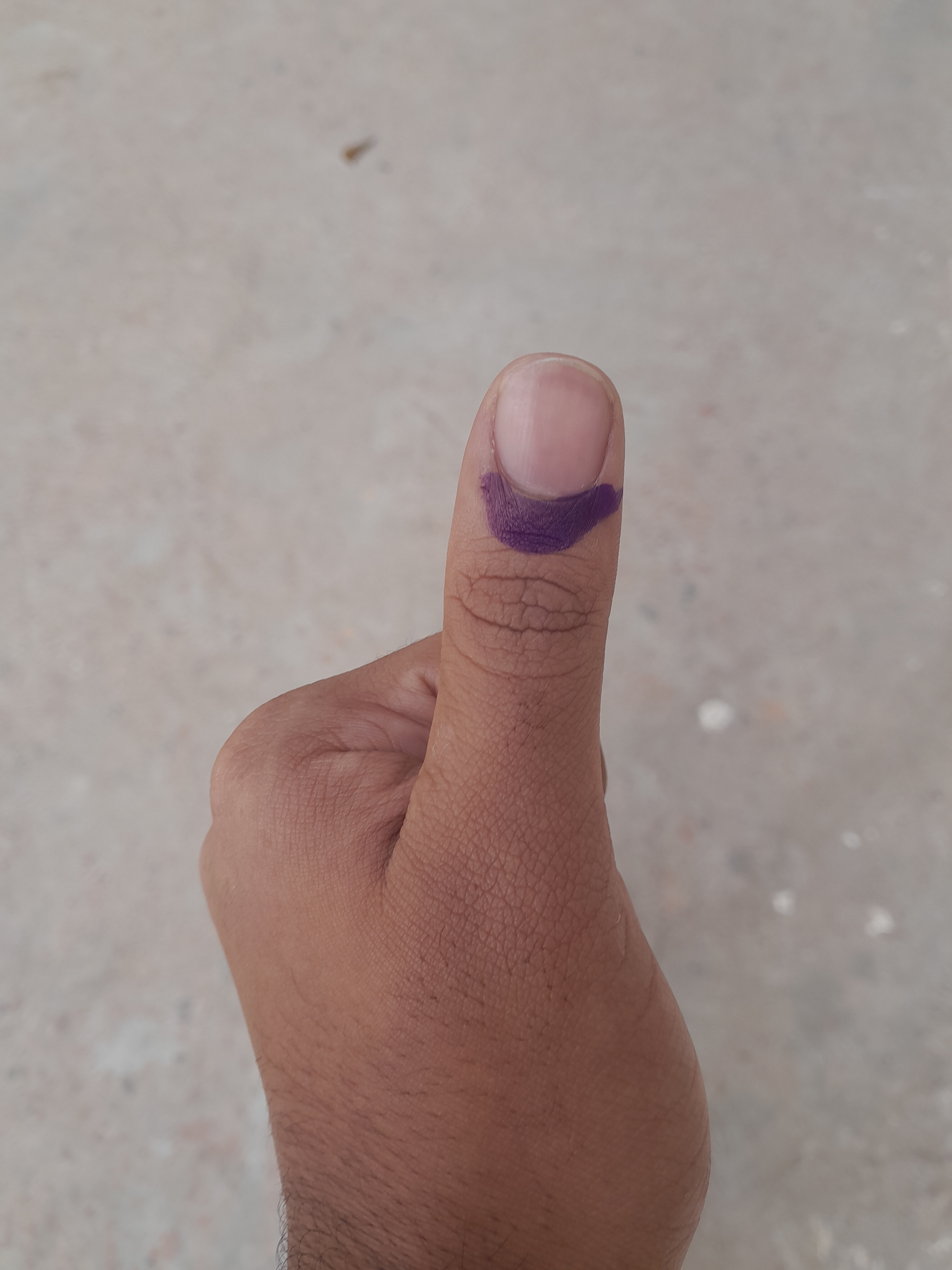
Violet coloured indelible ink in the thumb of a voter, 2026 Bangladeshi general election

Electoral stain is traditionally violet in colour before the photosensitive element takes effect to leave a black or brown mark. However, for the 2005 Surinamese legislative election, orange replaced violet as the colour for marking the voters' fingers. It was found to last just as long and be more appealing to voters, as it resembled the national colours.

== Efficiency ==
Marker pens are the most efficient use of ink, with one 5 ml pen able to mark 600 people, although dipping bottles are often preferred, despite a 100 ml bottle only marking 1000. Dipping bottles can leave a more comprehensive stain with slightly greater longevity (depending on silver nitrate content) than markers can. However, marker pens are much cheaper and easier to transport, considerably reducing costs to the election organisers, and the advised option when stains are only needed to be guaranteed for three to five days. Marker pens also leave a much smaller mark when properly applied, which is more agreeable to many voters.

== Controversies ==
The armed guerrilla Shining Path of Peru has repeatedly threatened to kill those found with indelible ink stains to dissuade from participation in elections.

In the 2004 Afghan presidential election, allegations of electoral fraud arose around the use of indelible ink stains, which many claimed were easily washed off. Election officials had chosen to use the more efficient marker pen option; however, regular marker pens were also sent out to polling stations, which led to confusion and some people being marked with less permanent ink.

In the 2008 Malaysian general election, the election authorities canceled the use of electoral stain a week before voters went to the polls, saying it would be unconstitutional to prevent people from voting even if they had already had their fingers stained. Additionally they cited reports of ink being smuggled in from neighboring Thailand to mark peoples' fingers before they had a chance to vote, thus denying them their rights.

During the 2008 Zimbabwean presidential election, reports surfaced that those who had chosen not to vote were attacked and beaten by government-sponsored mobs. The mobs attacked those without ink on their finger.

During the 2010 Afghan parliamentary election, the Taliban delivered night letters threatening to cut off anybody's finger which was marked with indelible ink.

During the 2013 Malaysian general election, in light of the first-ever implementation of electoral stain, voters reported that the ink could be easily washed off with running water, despite assurances by the Election Commission of Malaysia on the contrary.

== International use ==
A group of friends take a picture of their inked fingers together during the 2026 Malacca state election in Malaysia.

Some of the countries that have used election ink at some point includes:

- Albania
- Algeria
- Antigua and Barbuda
- The Bahamas
- Cambodia
- Dominica
- Egypt
- Guatemala
- Honduras
- India
- Indonesia
- Iraq
- Jamaica
- Kenya
- Lebanon
- Libya
- Malaysia
- Maldives
- Mexico
- Myanmar
- Nepal
- Nicaragua
- Nigeria
- Pakistan
- Philippines
- Saint Kitts and Nevis
- Solomon Islands
- South Africa
- Sri Lanka
- Sudan
- Syria
- Trinidad and Tobago
- Tunisia
- Uganda
- Zimbabwe

=== Former users ===
- Afghanistan (until 2021)
- Chile (until 2012)
- Peru (until 2011)
- Turkey (until 2009)
- Venezuela (until 2017)

== See also ==
- I Voted sticker
