= Mysore Paints and Varnish =

Public paint manufacturing company

Mysore Paints and Varnish Limited (MPVL)
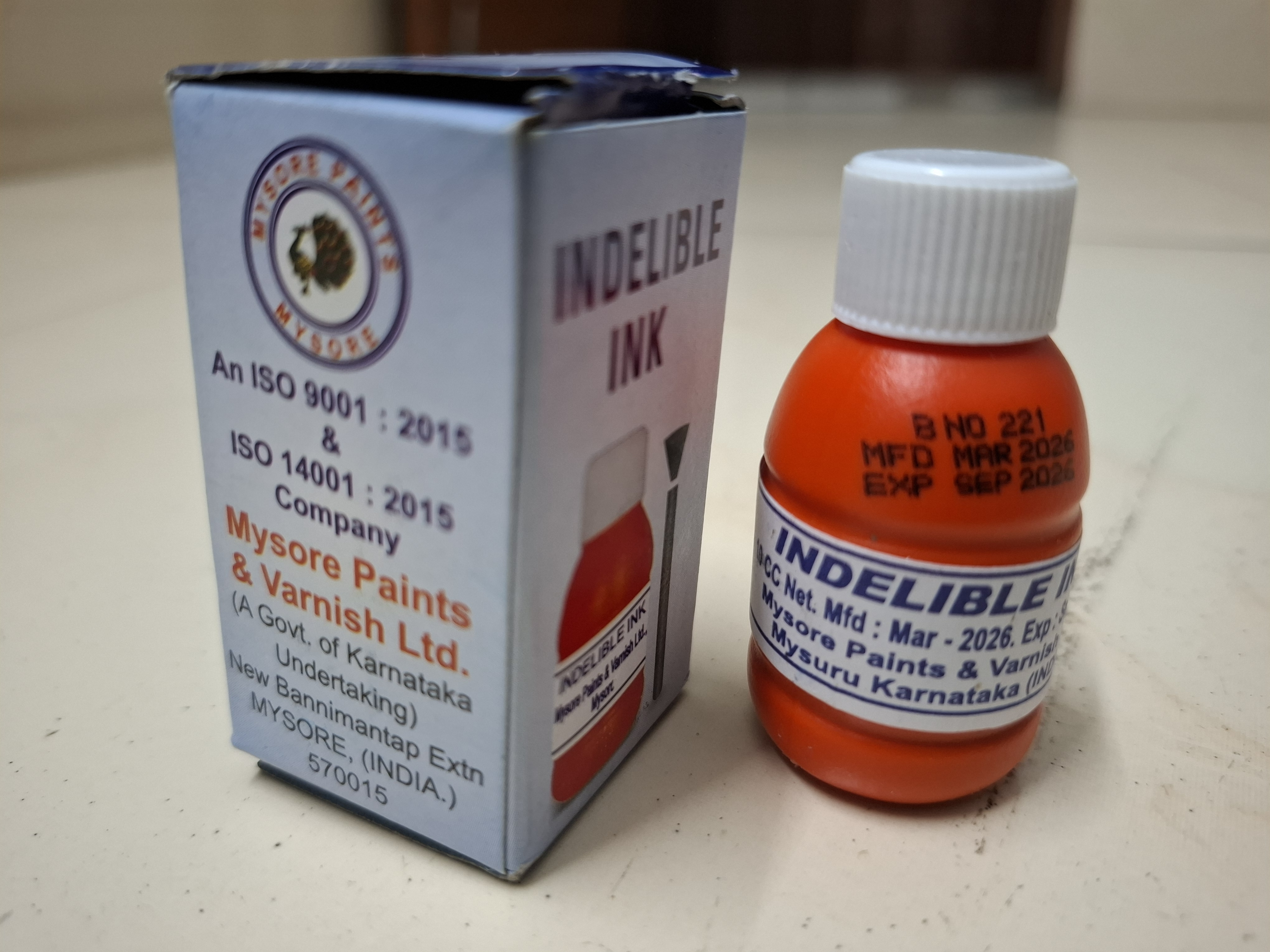
- Election ink manufactured by Mysore Paints & Varnish Limited
- Founder: Maharaja Krishnaraja Wadiyar IV
- Established: 1937
- Mission: Preparation of Indelible ink for the Elections in India and in some foreign countries.
- Owner: Government of Karnataka
- Formerly called: Mysore Lac and Paints Limited
- Location: Mysore, Karnataka, India
- Website: mysorepaints.karnataka.gov.in/english
- The company also manufactures other products such as chemical-resistant paints, enamels, primers, distempers, sealing wax, postage stamp cancellation, and polishes.

Mysore Paints and Varnish Limited, formerly Mysore Lac and Paints Limited, is a company located in the southern Indian city of Mysore, Karnataka. It is the only company in India authorised to produce indelible ink, which is used in elections to prevent people from voting multiple times. The company is currently owned and operated by the Government of Karnataka.

== History ==
Mysore Lac and Paints Limited was founded by Maharaja Krishnaraja Wadiyar IV in 1937 for manufacturing paints and related products. It became a public sector company when India gained independence in 1947. In 1962, it was selected to manufacture indelible ink, which was first used in the third general election of India. The manufacturing process is a closely guarded secret and is based on a chemical formula devised by the National Physical Laboratory of India.

== Products ==
=== Indelible ink ===
Indelible black ink was initially manufactured by the company to meet the needs of the Indian elections. It is usually applied on the finger nail of the voter and leaves an indelible mark which is not easy to erase. The mark stays on the finger for nearly 20 days. This prevents the voter from exercising the franchise again and hence checks fraud. The indelible ink is supplied in vials having volumes of 5 ml, 7.5 ml, 20 ml, 50 ml and 80 ml. A 5 ml vial can be used for about 300 voters.

One of the major customers for this ink is the Election Commission of India which places orders based on the number of voters involved in the election. The ink is then supplied to Chief Electoral Officers who further distribute it to individual voting centres. It is estimated that around 300 million people have had this ink applied over a period of 45 years.

The ink is also exported to countries like Thailand, Singapore, Nigeria, Malaysia and South Africa. It has also started manufacturing marker pens containing this ink for easy usage and this has also been used in elections held in Afghanistan. The company also manufactured indelible ink for Cambodian election in 2008 and 2013.

=== Other products ===
The company also manufactures other products such as chemical-resistant paints, enamels, primers, distempers, sealing wax, postage stamp cancellation, and polishes. The sealing wax manufactured by the MVPL is used by India Post, and the Election Commission to seal ballot boxes was the first product to be manufactured by them.

== Business ==
The company's business is highly dependent on the Indian general election (held once in five years) and in a year when the elections are held, significant increase in the revenue is observed. In the financial year 2006–2007, the company earned profits of ₹18 million (about $450K). For the 2004 general election of India, the company supplied orders worth ₹40 million (about $1 million). It earned ₹12.8 million (about $320K) when it supplied ink to the 2008 Cambodian general election.
