= World Against Violence and Extremism =

Proposal by Hassan Rouhani to denounce violence and extremism

The World against Violence and Extremism (Persian: جهان علیه خشونت و افراطی گری; acronym WAVE) is a conference proposed by Iranian President Hassan Rouhani. The United Nations voted approve President Rouhani's WAVE proposal at a general assembly in December, 2013 which resulted in a call for all nations across the globe to denounce violence and extremism.

In December, 2014, Tehran held a 2-day WAVE conference with representatives from more than 40 countries. This conference was referred to as, "the beginning of a new international coalition against extremism."

== See also ==
- Dialogue Among Civilizations
