= Rahimkhan Chalabianloo =

Iranian politician

- رحیم چلبیانلو
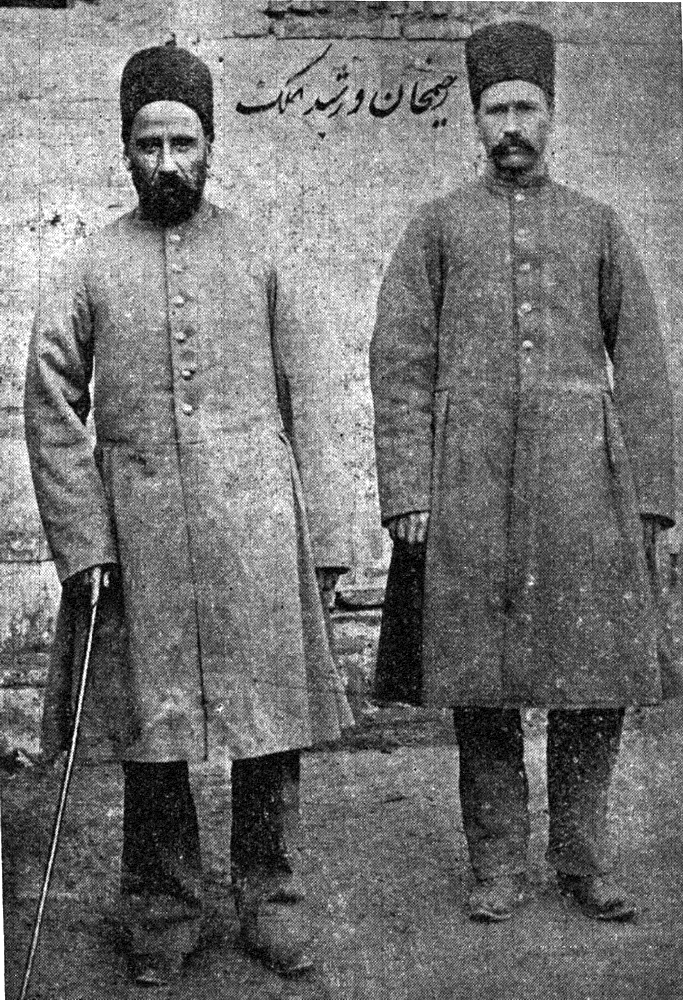
- Rahim Khan (left)

Personal details
- Born: Arasbaran
- Died: September 1911 Tabriz, Qajar Iran
- Military career
- Allegiance: Qajar Iran
- Rank: Major General
- Commands: Royal Guards
- Conflicts: Persian Constitutional Revolution; Recapture of Isfahan; Revolt of Mohammad Ali Shah Qajar

Rahimkhan Chalabianloo or Rahim Khan Chalabianlu, was a government official in power around the turn of the 19th century in Iran. He was from the Chalabianlu tribe and executed in 1911.

== Biography ==
According to the official documents Rahim Khan's ancestors had been exiled to the north of Arasbaran region by advancing Russian forces during the Russo-Persian War (1826–28). Rahim Khan was an army general during the era of Mozaffar ad-Din Shah Qajar. During the brief reign of Mohammad Ali Shah Qajar, Rahim Khan as the commander of the Royal Guards was a close confidant of the king. He was imprisoned after the revolutionary parliament accused his son of orchestrating the massacre of 200 peasants in Arasbaran. After he pretended to switch sides, the government sent him to fight a Kurdish rebellion in the West Azerbaijan province. He started anti-revolutionary activities as soon as he reached Ardabil and scored significant victories and completed the conquest of northeastern Azerbaijan. The revolutionary government in Tehran dispatched a well equipped force under the command of Yeprem Khan, which defeated Rahim Khan by the end of December 1909. He sought asylum in Russia.

In January 1911 Raḥīm Khan returned to Iran. He was soon lured to Tabrīz by the leaders of the provincial anjoman. There, first he was placed under police surveillance and, later, was incarcerated in the Ark. In September 1911, he was secretly executed during Moḥammad-ʿAlī Shah's unsuccessful attempt to reestablish himself in power.
