= Tarikhe Dokhanieh =

- Author: Hassan Isfahani Karbalayi (Persian: حسن اصفهانی کربلایی)
- Original title: Persian: تاریخ دخانیه یا تاریخ وقایع تحریم تنباکو
- Language: Farsi
- Subject: Tobacco Protest
- Genre: Historical
- Publication date: 1892 AD (1310 AH, 1271 SH)
- Publication place: Iran

Second Edition
- Republication Date: 1998 AD, 1377 SH
- Edited by: Rasoul Jafarian
- Pages: 232
- Publishers: Al-Hadi
- Published in: Iran
- ISBN: 964-4001-06-0

Third Edition
- Republication Date: 2003 AD, 1382 SH
- Edited by: Rasoul Jafarian
- Pages: 292
- Publishers: Islamic Revolution Document Center
- Published in: Iran
- ISBN: 964-8134-48-0

Tarikhe Dokhanieh (Persian: تاریخ دخانیه) (means: The History of Tobacco or History of Events of the Tobacco Sanctions) is one of the primary sources of Tobacco Protest events, written by Hassan Isfahani Karbalyi (born in Isfahan and living until 1 June 1904 in Kadhimiya). Hassan Isfahani Karbalyi was a student of Mirza Shirazi, who wrote this book at the request of Muhammad Hossein Naini, about the events of Tobacco Protest in 1892 AD (1271 SH, 1310 AH).

The second edition of Tarikhe Dokhanieh was published in Iran in 1998 after being revised by Rasoul Jafarian, who also wrote an introduction to the book. In 2003, Jafarian again edited and re-published the text.

== Hassan Isfahani ==
Isfahani also known as Hassan Isfahani Karbalyi, is the author of Tarikhe Dokhanieh. He was a distinguished scholar among Ayatollah Mirza Shirazi and Ayatollah Ismail as-Sadr's students. He emigrated to Samarra around 1883 AD (1300 AH, 1261 SH), and attended Ayatollah Mirza Shirazi's lectures, mapping his lessons in Jurisprudence (Fiqh) and Principles of Islamic jurisprudence. He completed the compilation of the Tarikhe Dokhanieh in 1892 AD (1310 AH, 1271 SH). He stayed in Samarra until the death of Mirza Shirzai, then returned to Karbala in 1896 AD (1314 AH, 1275 SH) and became Ismail as-Sadr's student. He died in Kadhimiya and was buried there on 1 June 1904 AD (1322 AH, 1283 SH).

His masters included Seyed Mohammad Esfahani, Sheikh Fazlollah Noori and Sayyed Muhammad Tabatabai Fesharaki. Hassan and Muhammad Hossein Naini were close friends. At that time, Hassan was a prominent mujtahid but not conversant as Naini. Naini told him to write Tarikhe Dokhanieh, among the most comprehensive books on this subject. After Hassan's death, Naini took charge of his family. Hassan's student Abd al-Husayn Sharaf al-Din al-Musawi was more courageous and more aroused in the controversy and debate than Naini.

== Book ==
Although Isfahani was a Faqīh, his book on the history of Tobacco Protest largely followed the style of historical writing. The author's commitment to writing the history of such a movement illustrates the high status that it had in his religious and political beliefs. He outlined his own intellectual orientation. The most important points are:

- The movement of the people, in other words the presence of the masses, in the Tobacco Protest.
- The precise concept of a nation was given to the Muslim nation of Iran, which had a common religious identity, and referred to the Ulama as the head of the nation and placed the government against them.
- In his view, "the exaltation of the word of the nation" is equal to the "exaltation of the word of Islam" and, in general, means the strength and power of this common religious identity among the masses.
- The use of telegraph text as movement documents, also letters from various cities.
- Getting acquainted with modern-day thoughts and those of critics of foreign imitation.

== See also ==
- Tobacco Protest
- Tobacco fatwa
- Mirza Shirazi
- Sheikh Fazlollah Noori
- Sayyed Muhammad Tabatabei Fesharaki
- Muhammad Hossein Naini
- Ismail as-Sadr
- Isfahan National Holy Association
