= Constitution House of Isfahan =

Historic house in Isfahan, Iran

Coordinates: 32°39′13.1″N 51°40′50.89″E

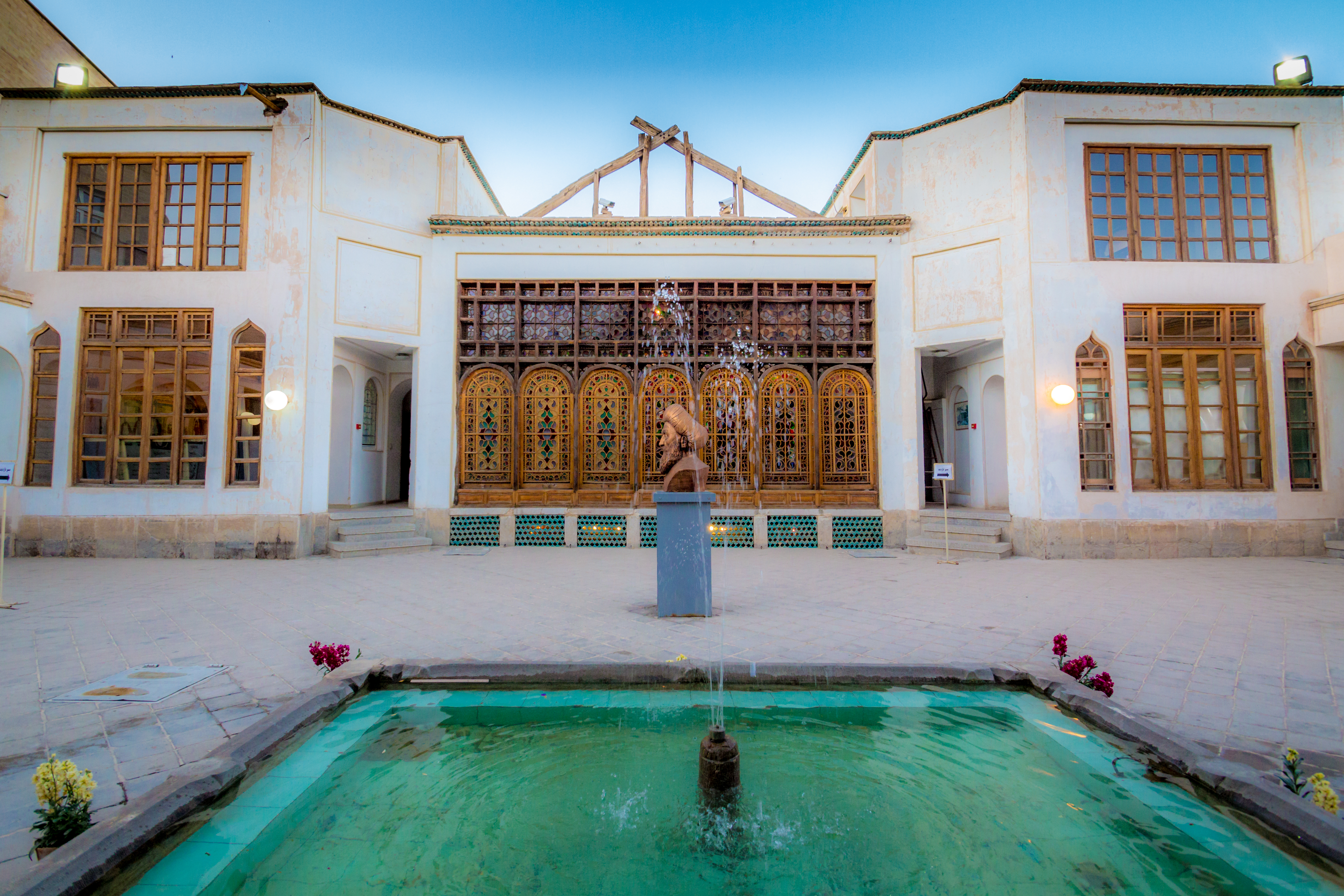

General information
- Location: Isfahan, Iran

Constitution House of Isfahan (Persian: خانهٔ مشروطه اصفهان), also known as Khaneh Mashroutiyat or Khaneh Haj Aqha Nourrollah Najafi Esfahani, is an edifice located next to the Naqsh-e Jahan Square, on Neshat Ave in Isfahan, Iran.

== History ==
Safa Khaneh was built by Haj Aqa Nourollah and his older brother.

== Gallery ==
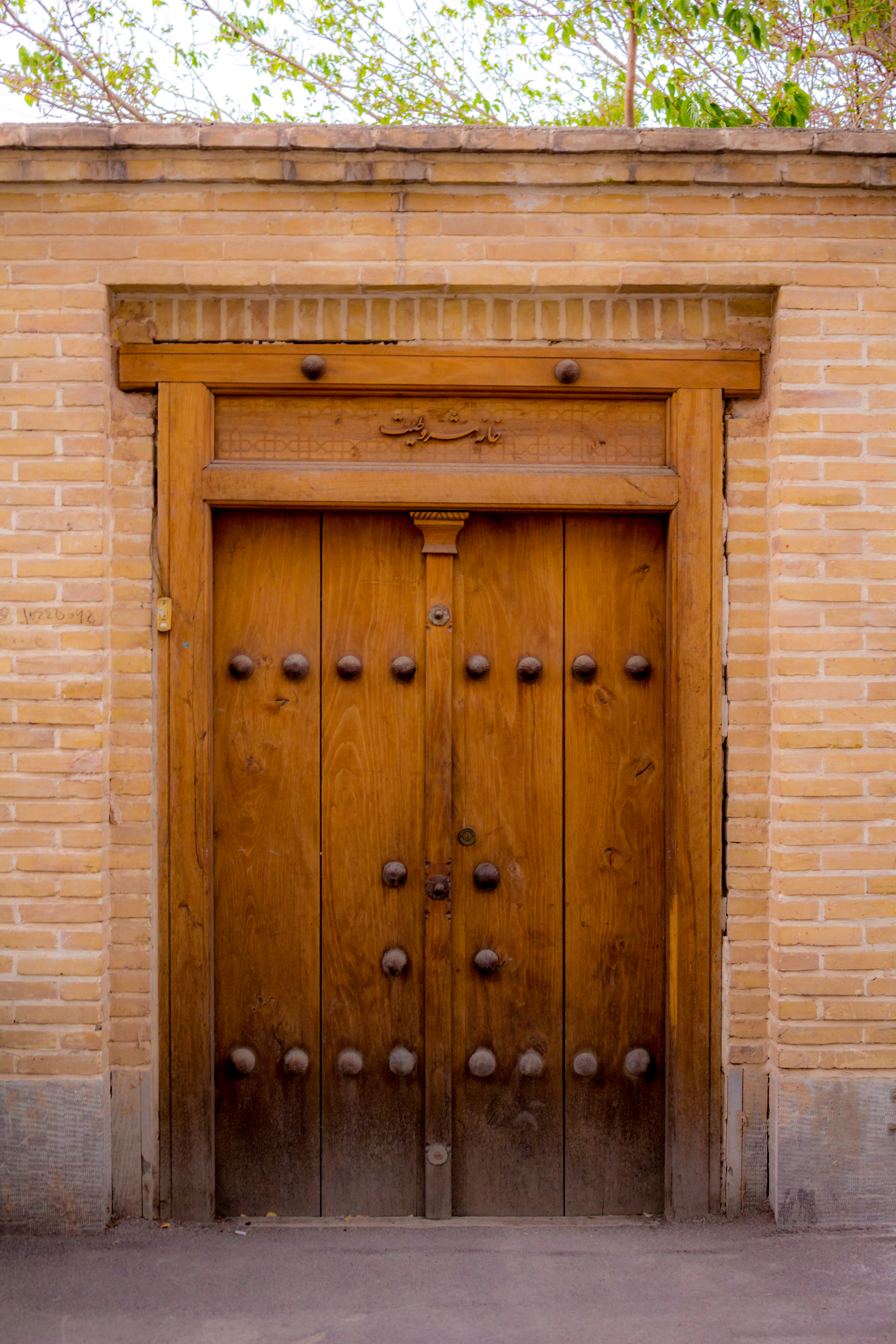
Entrance

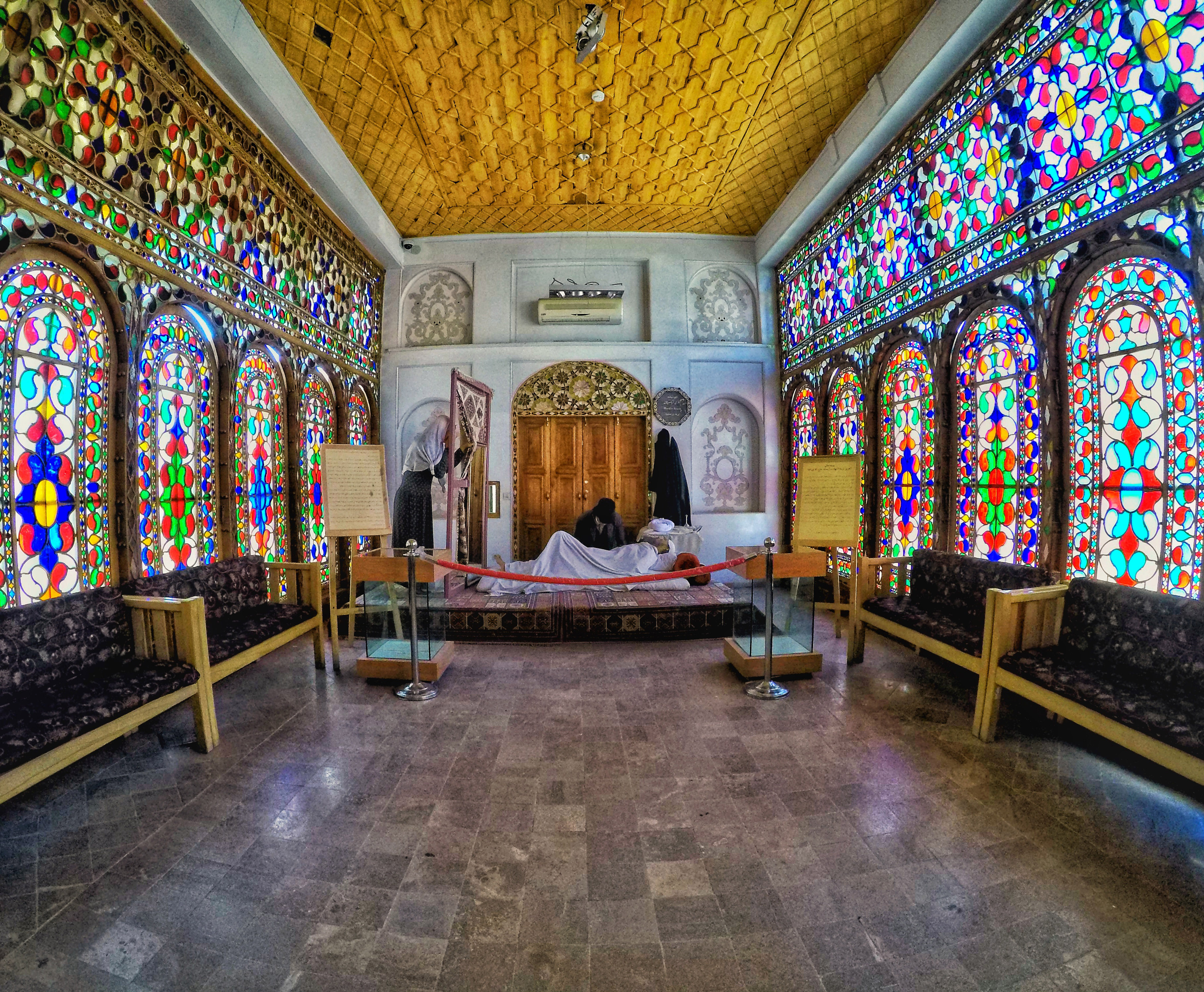
Interior
