= National Physical Laboratory of India =

Indian laboratory to set standards

National Physical Laboratory

Agency overview
- Formed: 4 January 1947
- Headquarters: New Delhi
- Agency executive: Prof.Dr. Venu Gopal Achanta, Director
- Parent agency: Council of Scientific and Industrial Research
- Website: nplindia.in

The CSIR- National Physical Laboratory of India, situated in New Delhi, is the measurement standards laboratory of India. It maintains standards of SI units in India and calibrates the national standards of weights and measures.

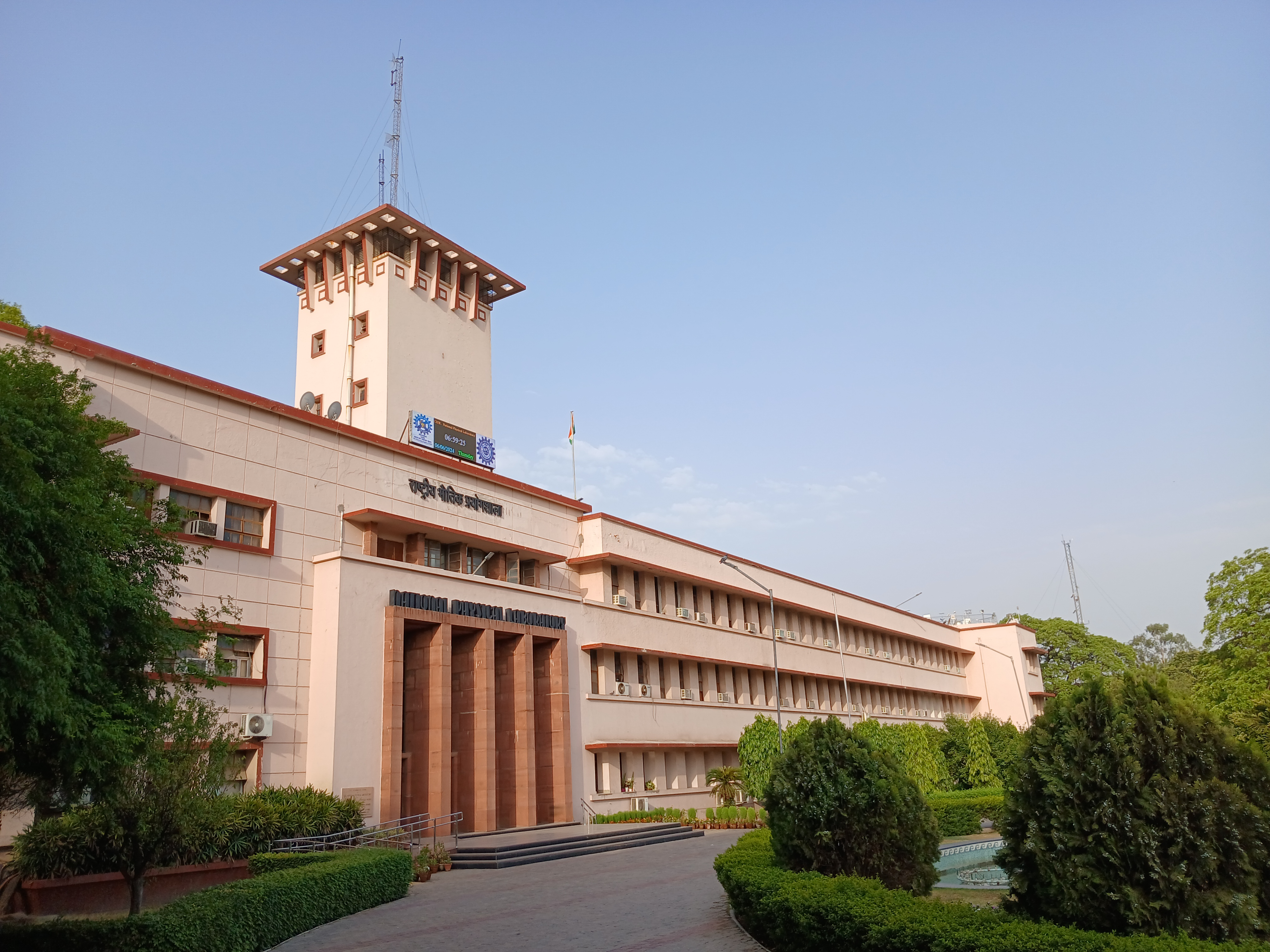
National physical laboratory in Delhi.

== History of measurement systems in India ==
In the Harappan era, which is nearly 5000 years old, one finds excellent examples of town planning and architecture. The sizes of the bricks were the same all over the region. In the time of Chandragupta Maurya, some 2400 years ago, there was a well - defined system of weights and measures. The government of that time ensured that everybody used the same system. In the Indian medical system, Ayurveda, the units of mass and volume were well defined.

The measurement system during the time of the Mughal emperor, Akbar, the guz was the measure of length. The guz was widely used till the introduction of the metric system in India in 1956. During the British period, efforts were made to achieve uniformity in weights and measures. A compromise was reached in the system of measurements which continued till India's independence in 1947. After independence in 1947, it was realized that for fast industrial growth of the country, it would be necessary to establish a modern measurement system in the country. The Lok Sabha in April 1955 resolved : This house is of the opinion that the Government of India should take necessary steps to introduce uniform weights and measures throughout the country based on metric system

Key Functions of NPL:

Maintaining SI Units: NPL establishes and maintains the Indian standards for the International System of Units (SI), which includes units like meter, kilogram, second, ampere, kelvin, candela, and mole.

Calibrating National Standards: NPL calibrates the national standards of weights and measures to ensure their accuracy and traceability to international standards.

Conducting Research: NPL conducts research in various fields of physics, including metrology, materials science, and nanotechnology.

Providing Calibration and Testing Services: NPL offers calibration and testing services to industries and other organizations to help them maintain product quality and comply with regulatory standards.

Disseminating Time and Frequency: NPL provides accurate time and frequency signals to various users through satellite, radio, and television broadcasts.

== History of the National Physical Laboratory, India ==
The National Physical Laboratory, India was one of the earliest national laboratories set up under the Council of Scientific & Industrial Research. Jawaharlal Nehru laid the foundation stone of NPL on 4 January 1947. Dr. K. S. Krishnan was the first Director of the laboratory. The main building of the laboratory was formally opened by Former Deputy Prime Minister Sardar Vallabhbhai Patel on 21 January 1950. Former Prime Minister Indira Gandhi, inaugurated the Silver Jubilee Celebration of the Laboratory on 23 December 1975.

NPL Charter:-

The main aim of the laboratory is to strengthen and advance physics-based research and development for the overall development of science and technology in the country. In particular its objectives are:

To establish, maintain and improve continuously by research, for the benefit of the nation, National Standards of Measurements and to realize the Units based on International System (Under the subordinate Legislations of Weights and Measures Act 1956, reissued in 1988 under the 1976 Act). To identify and conduct after due consideration, research in areas of physics which are most appropriate to the needsof the nation and for advancement of field

To assist industries, national and other agencies in their developmental tasks by precision measurements, calibration, development of devices, processes, and other allied problems related to physics.

To keep itself informed of and study critically the status of physics.

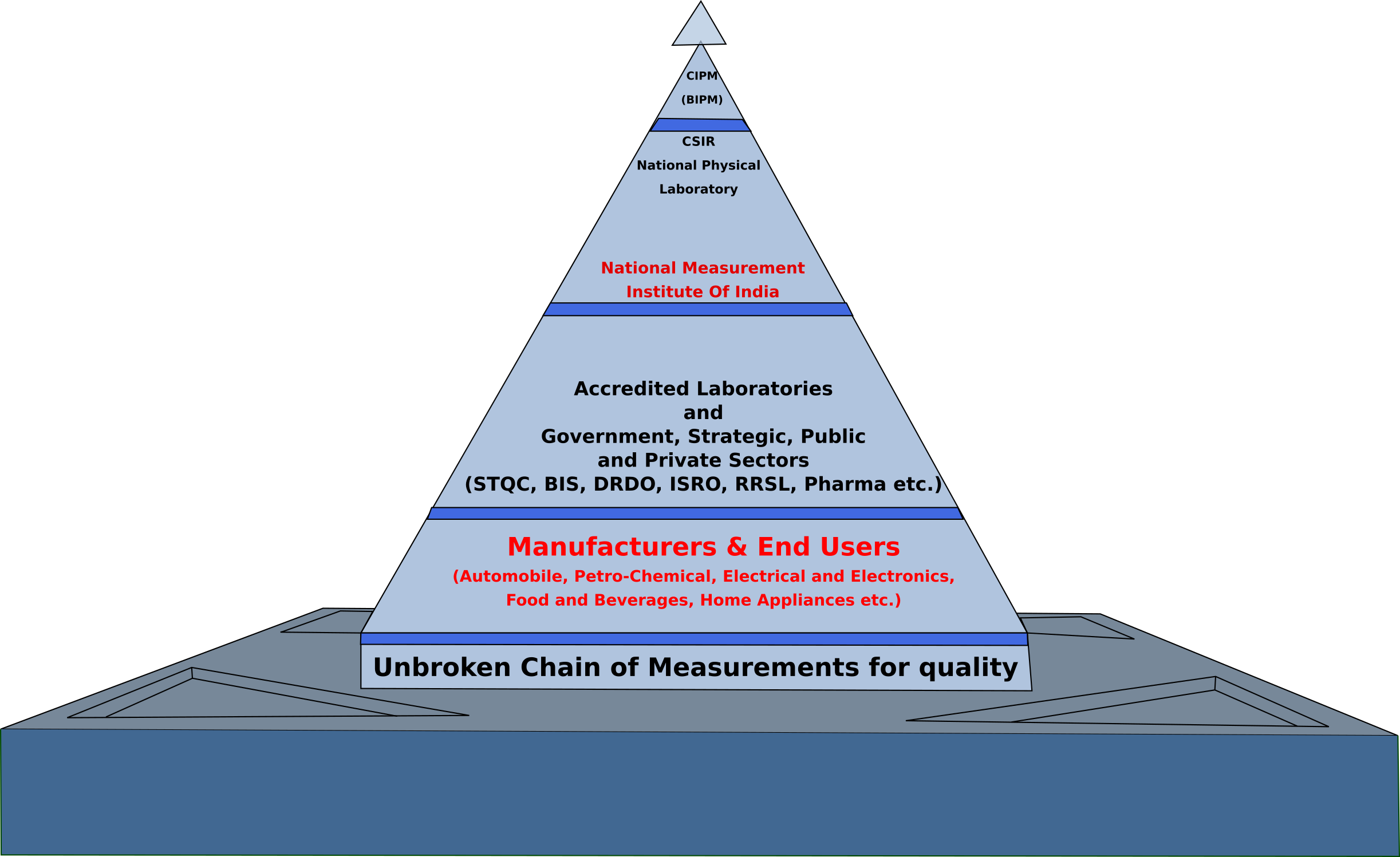
Newly established structures at NPL campus

In 1957, India became member of the General Conference of Weight and Measures (CGPM), BIPM, an International Intergovernmental organization constituted by diplomatic treaty, i.e. ‘The Metre Convention’. Being NMI of India and to fulfil the mandate, Dr. K. S. Krishnan, the then Director, CSIR-NPL signed the ‘Metre Convention’ on behalf of Government of India. In 1958, BIPM provided CSIR-NPL the Copies No. 57 (NPK) and No. 4 of International Prototypes of the Kilogram (IPK) and the platinum-iridium (Pt–Ir) Metre bar, respectively, to realize the SI base units ‘kilogram’ and ‘metre’. This was the milestone in the foundation of quality infrastructure in independent India.

In 1960, when the metric system was officially adopted as the basis for SI units, the number of base units being maintained at the NPL increased. However, in 1963 on the recommendation of Nobel Laureate P.M.S. Blackett, these groups were brought together under a single umbrella. The objective was to bring greater coordination between the various groups and to give the standards activity a programme-based approach on a bigger scale and enable the Laboratory to play its role more effectively. Other physical standards in the form of standard cells, standard resistance coils, standard lamps, etc. were acquired and calibration and testing work were started in these areas also. It has since been maintaining six SI base units; namely, metre (for length), kilogram (for mass), second (for time), kelvin (for temperature), ampere (for current) and candela (for luminous intensity).

== Maintenance of standards of measurements in India ==
Each modernized country, including India has a National Metrological Institute (NMI), which maintains the standards of measurements. This responsibility has been given to the National Physical Laboratory, New Delhi.

=== Metre ===
The standard unit of length, metre, is realized by employing a stabilized helium-neon laser as a source of light. Its frequency is measured experimentally. From this value of frequency and the internationally accepted value of the speed of light (299792458 m/s), the wavelength is determined using the relation:

$$wavelength = \frac{velocity-of-light}{frequency}$$

The nominal value of wavelength, employed at NPL is 633 nanometer. By a sophisticated instrument, known as an optical interferometer, any length can be measured in terms of the wavelength of laser light.

The present level of uncertainty attained at NPL in length measurements is ±3 × 10^{−9}. However, in most measurements, an uncertainty of ±1 × 10^{−6} is adequate.

=== Kilogramme ===
The Indian national standard of mass, kilogramme, is copy number 57 of the international prototype of the kilogram supplied by the International Bureau of Weights and Measures (BIPM: French – Bureau International des Poids et Mesures), Paris. This is a platinum-iridium cylinder whose mass is measured against the international prototype at BIPM. The NPL also maintains a group of transfer standard kilograms made of non-magnetic stainless steel and nickel-chromium alloy.

The uncertainty in mass measurements at NPL is ±4.6 × 10^{−9}.

=== Second ===
The national standard of time interval, second as well as frequency, is maintained through four parameters, which can be measured most accurately. Therefore, attempts are made to link other physical quantities to time and frequency. The standard maintained at NPL has to be linked to different users. This process, known as dissemination, is carried out in a number of ways. For applications requiring low levels of uncertainty, there is satellite based dissemination service, which utilizes the Indian national satellite, INSAT. Time is also disseminated through TV, radio, and special telephone services. The caesium atomic clocks maintained at NPL are linked to other such instituted all over the world through a set of global positioning satellites.

=== Ampere ===
The unit of electric current, ampere, is realized at NPL by measuring the volt and the ohm separately.

The uncertainty in measurement of ampere is ± 1 × 10^{−6}.

=== Kelvin ===
The standard of temperature is based on the International Temperature Scale of 1990 (ITS-90). This is based on the assigned temperatures to several fixed points. One of the most fundamental temperatures of these is the triple point of water. At this temperature, ice, water and steam are at equilibrium with each other. This temperature has been assigned the value of 273.16 kelvins. This temperature can be realized, maintained and measured in the laboratory. At present temperature standards maintained at NPL cover a range of 54 to 2,473 kelvins.

The uncertainty in its measure is ± 2.5 × 10^{−4}.

=== Candela ===
The unit of luminous intensity, candela, is realized by using an absolute radiometer. For practical work, a group of tungsten incandescent lamps are used.

The level of uncertainty is ± 1.3 × 10^{−2}.

=== Mole ===
Experimental work has been initiated to realize mole, the SI unit for amount of substance

=== Radiation ===
The NPL does not maintain standards of measurements for ionizing radiations. This is the responsibility of the Bhabha Atomic Research Centre, Mumbai.

== Calibrator of weights and measures ==
The standards maintained at NPL are periodically compared with standards maintained at other National Metrological Institutes in the world as well as the BIPM in Paris. This exercise ensures that Indian national standards are equivalent to those of the rest of the world.

Any measurement made in a country should be directly or indirectly linked to the national standards of the country, For this purpose, a chain of laboratories are set up in different states of the country. The weights and measures used in daily life are tested in the laboratories and certified. It is the responsibility of the NPL to calibrate the measurement standards in these laboratories at different levels. In this manner, the measurements made in any part of the country are linked to the national standards and through them to the international standards.

The weights and balances used in local markets and other areas are expected to be certified by the Department of Weights and Measures of the local government. Working standards of these local departments should, in turn, be calibrated against the state level standards or any other laboratory which is entitled to do so. The state level laboratories are required to get their standards calibrated from the NPL at the national level which is equivalent to the international standards.

== Bharatiya Nirdeshak Dravya (BND) or Indian Reference Materials ==
Bharatiya Nirdeshak Dravya (BND) or Indian reference materials are reference materials developed by NPL which derive their traceability from National Standards.

== Research programs ==
NPL is also involved in research. One of the important research activities undertaken by NPL is to devise the chemical formula for the indelible ink which is being used in the Indian elections to prevent fraudulent voting. This ink, manufactured by the Mysore Paints and Varnish Limited is applied on the finger nail of the voter as an indicator that the voter has already cast his vote.

NPL also have section working on development of biosensors. Currently the division is headed by Dr. C. Sharma and section is primarily focusing on development of sensor for cholesterol, measurement and microfluidic based biosensors. Section is also developing biosensors for Uric acid detection.

=== India’s polar research program ===
During the 28th Indian Scientific Expeditions to Antarctica (ISEA) (2008-2009), CSIR-NPL established a state of art Indian Polar Space Physics Laboratory (IPSPL) at Indian Permanent Research Base Maitri (70 0 46’ S, 110 43’ E), Antarctica on the occasion of International Polar Year (IPY) for continuous and real time monitoring of high latitude ionosphere to address the scientific interest of high latitudinal ionospheric consequences caused by the modulation of near-earth space environmental conditions. In 2011 CSIR-NPL provided leadership to the Antarctic expedition to India's newly constructed 3rd permanent scientific base “Bharati” (69° 24’ S, 76 ° 11’) to test & validate its facilities during extreme winter conditions. CSIR NPL is also the part of India's arctic expeditions. Himadri is India's first permanent Arctic research station located at the International Arctic Research base, Ny-Ålesund at Spitsbergen, Svalbard Norway. It was set up during India's second Arctic expedition in June 2008. It is located 1200 km from the North Pole.

== NPL's contributions ==
=== The indelible mark/ink ===
During general election, nearly 40 million people wear a CSIR mark on their fingers. The indelible ink used to mark the fingernail of a voter during general elections is a time-tested gift of CSIR to the spirit of democracy. Developed in 1952, it was first produced in-campus. Subsequently, industry has been manufacturing the Ink. It is also exported to Sri Lanka, Indonesia, Turkey and other democracies.

=== Pristine air-quality monitoring station at Palampur ===
National Physical Laboratory (NPL) has established an atmospheric monitoring station in the campus of Institute of Himalayan Bioresource Technology (IHBT) at Palampur (H.P.) at an altitude of 1391 m for generating the base data for atmospheric trace species & properties to serve as reference for comparison of polluted atmosphere in India. At this station, NPL has installed state of art air monitoring system, greenhouse gas measurement system and Raman Lidar. A number of parameters like CO, NO, NO_{2}, NH_{3}, SO_{2}, O_{3}, PM, HC & BC besides CO_{2} & CH_{4} are being currently monitored at this station which is also equipped with weather station (AWS) for measurement of weather parameters.

=== Gold standard (BND-4201) ===
The BND-4201 is first Indian reference material for gold of ‘9999’ fineness (gold that is 99.99% pure with impurities of only 100 parts-per-million).

== Honors and awards bestowed upon CSIR-NPL Staff ==
=== Padma Bhushan ===
- Dr. K.S. Krishnan - 1954
- Dr. A.R. Verma – 1982
- Dr. A.P. Mitra - 1989
- Dr. S.K. Joshi - 2003

=== Padma Shri ===
- Dr. S.K. Joshi – 1991

=== Shanti Swarup Bhatnagar Prize ===
- Dr. K.S. Krishnan - 1958
- Dr. A.P. Mitra – 1968
- Dr. Vinay Gupta - 2017

== Other awards ==
Contributors to Nobel Peace Prize-winning team for Intergovernmental Panel on Climate Change IPCC Dr. A.P. Mitra & Dr. Chhemmendra Sharma – 2007

== See also ==
- National Institute of Standards and Technology in the United States
- National Physical Laboratory (United Kingdom)
- Versailles project on advanced materials and standards
