= Secret Society (Persia) =

The Secret Society (Persian: انجمن مخفی, romanized: Anjoman-e Maxfi) was a politically active secret society in Persia, founded in 1904. It played an important role in the Persian Constitutional Revolution. Contrary to allied organizations such as the Revolutionary Committee, the Society of Humanity, the Social Democratic Party, and the Secret Center which were organized by the modern intelligentsia, it drew its members predominantly from the traditional middle class.
