= Central Society =

The Central Society (Persian: انجمن مرکزی, romanized: Anjoman-e markazi) was an influential federation of more than 140 pro-Constitutional Revolution associations and organizations in Persia, based in Tehran. It was able to organize general strikes in bazaar, mobilize over 50,000 demonstrators and 3,000 armed volunteers to defend the Majlis of Iran.
