= Agha Najafi Esfahani =

Iranian religious leader

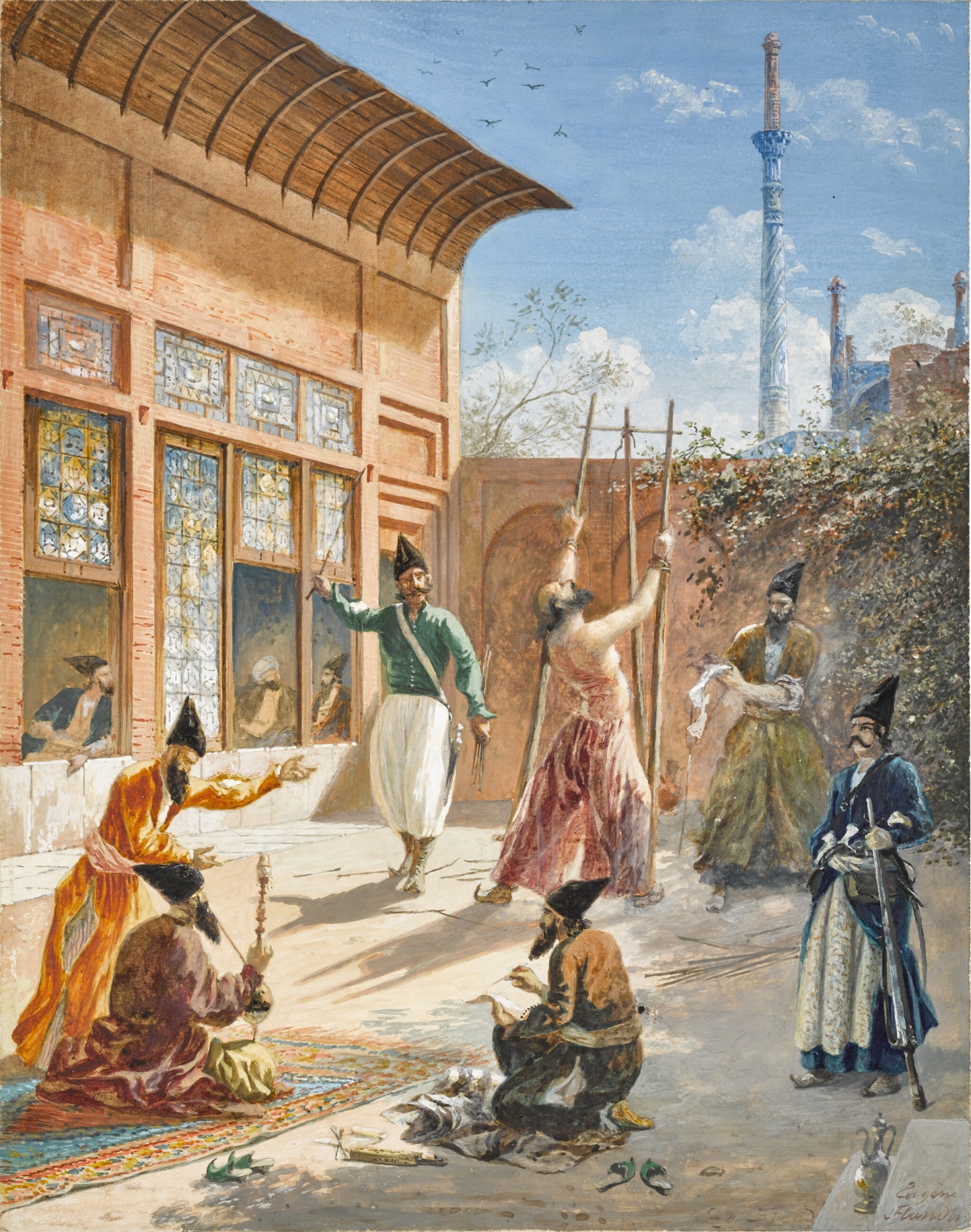
A view of Agha Najafi Esfahani's home in Isfahan, during the reign of Qajar shah Naser al-Din Shah (r. 1848-1896). The city's Shah Mosque can be seen in the background. Painted by Eugène Flandin

Hajji Shaikh Mohammad-Taqi Esfahani (1846-1914; Persian: حاج شیخ محمدتقی نجفی اصفهانی), commonly known as Agha Najafi Esfahani (آقانجفی اصفهانی), was a prominent Iranian religious leader during the Qajar era, particularly in the city of Isfahan, where he served as the prayer leader at the Shah Mosque (Masjed-e Shah), Isfahan's foremost mosque.

Hailing from a lineage associated with the local rulers (khans) of Varamin near Tehran, Agha Najafi's family migrated to Isfahan, a thriving center for religious studies at the time. The family produced a lineage of eminent scholars, including numerous olama and mojtaheds—high-ranking Shi'i jurisprudents. Agha Najafi's grandfather, Shaikh Mohammad-Taqi ibn Abdolrahim (entitled Saheb-e Hashia; died 1832), and his father's uncle, Shaikh Moḥammad-Hosayn ibn ʿAbdolrahim (entitled Saheb-e Fosul; died 1845), established a notable school of Shi'ite jurisprudence. This institution gained recognition and garnered followers, among them later Shi'ite authorities such as Akhund Khorasani.
