= Sayyed Muhammad Tabatabei Fesharaki =

Shia Islam jurist

Sayyed Muhammad Tabatabei Fesharaki (Persian:سید محمد طباطبایی فشارکی) was an eminent shia jurist in 13th Lunar Hijrah. He was considered as Master of eminent religious scholars such as Muhammad Hosein Na'ini and Abdul-Karim Ha'eri Yazdi, the founder of Qom Seminary.

== Life ==
He was born in a known family of Tabatabaei Sadat. His father Abulqasem had a child called Sayyed Muhammad in Fesharak Isfahan. Sayyed Muhammad lost his father during his early childhood years. His mother raised him until he finished his education. Travelling in Karbala, Muhammad participated in the courses of Hasan ibn Sayyed Muhammad Mujahid. He also learned about fiqh and principles from Fazil Ardekani an eminent master. He also traveled to Najaf and took part in the courses od Mirazye Shirazi. He had a particular relation with his master Mirza Shirazi such a way that Mirza consulted with him in solving the problems and different subjects.

== Pupils ==
He could introduced eminent pupils in shia religious sciences. some of them are as follow:

- Abdul-Karim Ha'eri Yazdi the founder of Qom Seminary
- Agha Zia Addin Araghi
- Allameh Shaykh Muhammad javad balaghi
- Hoseini Tehrani
- Mirza Muhammad Hosein Na'ini
- Sayyed ali Modarres Kochak
- Sayyed Hasan Modarres
- Shaykh Muhammad Reza Masjed Shahi

== Works ==
- Al Eqsal
- Al furu Al Muhammadyyah
- Al Khiarat
- Dima Al Salasah
- Essay on Al Kholal
- Essay On Primary of Bara'ah

== Ethical characters ==
He avoided to being familiar as Mujtahid and try to live in unfamiliarity.

== See also ==
- Intellectual movements in Iran
- Iranian Constitutional Revolution
- Mirza Hussein Naini
- Mohammad-Kazem Khorasani
