= Recapture of Isfahan =

- Part of Persian Constitutional Revolution
Date	1909
Location	Isfahan, Qajar Iran
Result	Revolutionary victory
Territorial changes	Revolutionary forces captured Isfahan

Belligerents
Iranian Constitutionalists	Qajar Iran

Commanders and leaders
Ali-Qoli Khan Bakhtiari	Rahim Khan (surrendered)

The Recapture of Isfahan was a battle of the Persian Constitutional Revolution which saw the arrival of Mujahideen Bakhtiari forces in Isfahan in early 1909.

== Background ==
After the bombardment of the Majlis by order of Mohammad Ali Shah Qajar and the beginning of the period known as the Minor Tyranny, many constitutionalists were arrested, exiled, or killed. This repression led to widespread dissatisfaction across Iran. In response, various groups including clerics, intellectuals, and different social classes openly supported the constitutional movement. This created the conditions for coordinated action by constitutionalist forces.

== Event ==
At this time, Bakhtiari tribal leaders united against Mohammad Ali Shah. Ali-Qoli Khan Bakhtiari, who was in Europe, returned to Iran after learning about the resistance in Tabriz and called for unity against the Shah. The Bakhtiari forces, in cooperation with local constitutionalist fighters in Isfahan, marched toward the city. After military operations and clashes, they succeeded in capturing Isfahan and bringing it under the control of the constitutionalists.

== Aftermath ==
With the fall of Isfahan, the city came under constitutionalist administration. This victory strengthened the revolutionary movement and helped pave the way for further advances, including the eventual march toward Tehran.

The capture of Isfahan, together with movements in other regions such as Gilan, played an important role in the later Conquest of Tehran, which led to the downfall of Mohammad Ali Shah and the restoration of constitutional rule.
