= Yousef Ahmadi =

Taliban spokesperson

Yousef Ahmadi یوسف احمدى
- Supreme Leader: Hibatullah Akhundzada
- Prime Minister: Hasan Akhund (acting)
- Minister: Khairullah Khairkhwa

Personal details
- Born: 1970s Zabul Province, Afghanistan
- Party: Taliban
- Children: 7
- Occupation: Spokesman, Taliban member

Qari Mohammad Yousef Ahmadi (Pashto: قارى محمد يوسف احمدى) is one of the two Taliban spokesmen, the other being Zabiullah Mujahid. In 2006, Ahmadi contacted Reuters, the Associated Press, Canadian Press and Afghan Islamic Press by satellite phone to offer Taliban messages regarding southern Afghanistan.

In August 2008, his name began appearing once again, as the focus of a number of Canadian Press interviews with Toby Cohen, in which he advised Canadians that they should elect a Prime Minister who would remove Canadian troops in Afghanistan. Ahmadi is quoted as saying that "the election is being held in Canada. That is why our attacks on Canadians are increased". He is also alleged to have said that the Taliban "don't want to fight with Canadians. Actually we want to create friendship with Canadians".

In November 2012, Ahmadi accidentally used CC instead of BCC when emailing a routine Taliban press release, exposing the names and email addresses of more than 400 Taliban press contacts. The list consisted mostly of journalists, as well as email addresses that may have belonged to an Afghan legislator, a provincial governor, academics, activists, an Afghan consultative committee, and a representative of Gulbuddin Hekmatyar.

== Personal information ==
Ahmadi was born and raised in Zabul Province. He has four sons and three daughters.

== Recent activities ==
Ahmadi is noted as a contributor/editor to the Taliban magazine Al Somod. In April 2014, he reported in detail on a suicide bomber that used a motorcycle to assassinate 50 US and ally soldiers.

His byline also appears on English-language Internet postings claiming to report insurgent activities.

On 24 August 2021, Ahmadi was introduced by Zabiullah Mujahid in a press conference. He was appointed as head of Taliban regime's Media and Information Center on 30 May 2023.

== See also ==
- Ahmadi (surname)
