= Society of Humanity =

Persian pseudo-Masonic group

Society of Humanity جامع آدمیت
- Founder: Mirza Abbas Quli Khan Qazvini
- Founded: 1904
- Dissolved: 1908
- Headquarters: Tehran
- Ideology: Utopian socialism Saint-Simonianism
- Political position: Left-wing

Society of Humanity (Persian: جامع آدمیت, romanized: Jāmeʿ-e Ādamīyat) was a pseudo-Masonic group in Persia, active from 1904 to 1908.

Inspired by the radical positivism of Saint Simon and the liberal humanism of Auguste Comte, it played an important role in the Persian Constitutional Revolution.
