= Haj Aqa Nourollah =

Iranian political leader (1859–1927)

Grand Ayatollah Haj Aqa Nourollah
- حاج آقا نورالله نجفی اصفهانی
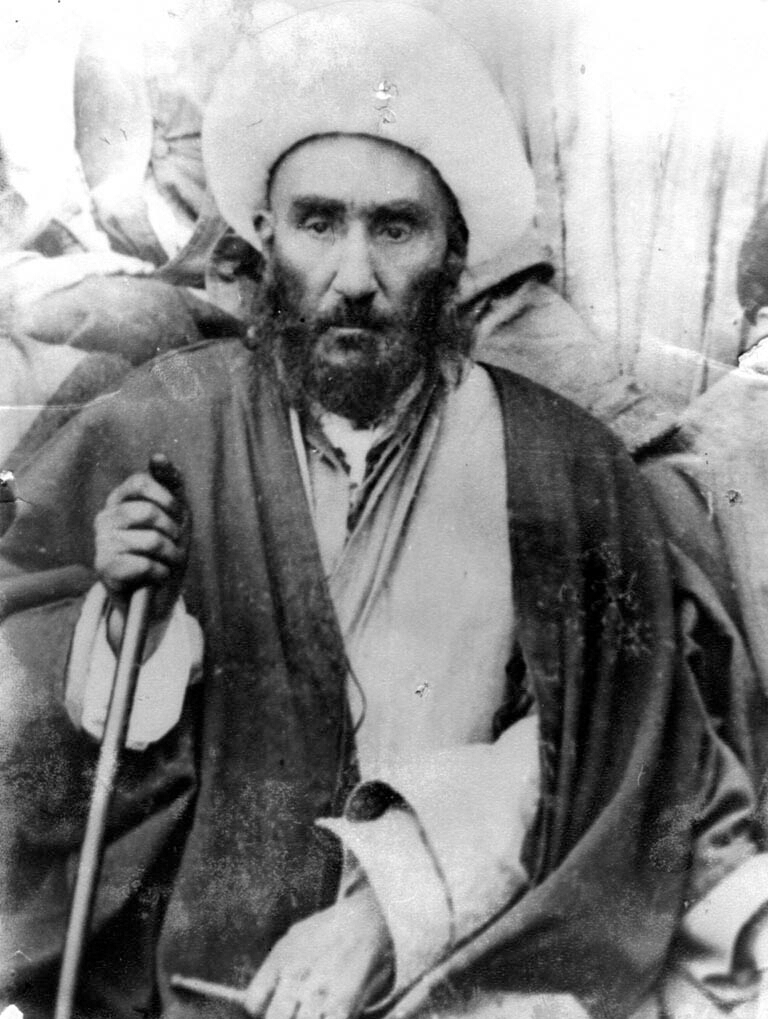

Personal details
- Born: Haj Aqa Nourollah; 1859 Isfahan, Sublime State of Iran
- Died: 1927 (aged 71) Qom, Imperial State of Iran
- Party: Learned Council

Haj Aqa Nourollah (Persian: نورالله نجفی اصفهانی; 1859–1927) was a political leader in the Persian Constitutional Revolution.

== Biography ==
Haj Aqa Nourollah was the son of Ayatollah Sheikh Mohammad Baqer Najafi–the author of Hedayat Al-Mosttahsredin. Haj Aqa Nourollah's grandmother was the late Ayatollah Sheikh Mohammaed Jafar Kashef Al-qeta’s daughter who was one of the descendants of Malek-e Ashtar Nakhai, the commander of Alī ibn Abī Ṭālib.

He was born in 1859. After finishing his education in Islamic science, he became a mujtahid (clergyman practicing religious jurisprudence). He believed that the main problem of Iran during the Qajar era was the Russian and English interventions in Iranian affairs as well as the shah's and oppressors’ tyranny. Nouroullah along with his brother, the late Ayatollah Shekikh Mohammad Taqi Najafi was entitled to Aqa Najafi. He struggled in Isfahan for half a century over the “tobacco boycott movement” (1309 AH) until Reza Shah Pahlavi's reign (1346 AH).

== Activities ==
Among his important measures were fighting against foreign goods; using domestic products; the idea of establishing Qeraatkhaneh; Islamic hospitals; establishing Yatimkhaneh (orphanage); establishing newspaper Safa Khaneh Community (a place for discussion between Muslims and Christians) and many other social and cultural activities. He was recognized as the head of the clergy of Iran; moreover Marja’-e taghlid (source of imitation) introduced him to the parliament as one of the five clergy who supervised the religious laws.

He called for jihad against Russia and England during World War I and protested against the colonial treaty in 1915 and 1919 (the treaty concluded by Vosugh od-Dowleh).

== Book ==
He wrote The Dialog Between the Settler and the Traveler which is an intellectual vindication of a kind of religious reading of the constitution. It is a theoretical plan in the form of discussion; considered the rubric of "the religious democracy" and also a chapter in the experience of "the Islamic government of shine scholars".

== Later life ==
The last chapter of his life was his struggle against Rezā Shāh Pahlavi's tyranny. The uprising started by him against the monarchy (1346) caused hundreds of scholars and the most prominent clergymen to gather in Qom to protest. He was martyred in Qom.

== Constitution house ==
More than 80 years after his death, his house became a museum that showcases his work, the constitution era and especially Isfahan.
