= Night letter =

Type of anonymous leaflet

A night letter is an unsigned leaflet distributed clandestinely.

== Afghanistan ==
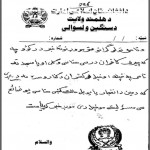
A Taliban "night letter" discouraging cooperation with foreign forces.

Night letters have been a tactic employed by the Taliban and other extremist groups in Afghanistan to intimidate supporters of secular government and education.

== Iran ==
A shabnama (Persian: شبنامه, lit. 'night letter') is a pamphlet communicating warnings or direction, which are surreptitiously distributed. Shabnama have been found throughout Iranian history. Shabnameh were widely distributed in the 20th century in Iran over the course of several revolutionary movements. An early 20th century example would be following the Persian Constitutional Revolution, when shabnameh were distributed in Tehran decrying the occupation of parts of Iranian territory by Russian troops, and against the changing of the legal examination laws.

== Israel ==
In the late 1970s, Israeli peace activists belonging to the Shelly Party, a small left-wing party then holding two seats in the Knesset, distributed numerous such night letters in the postboxes of Tel Aviv houses. The leaflets contained eye-witness testimonies on severe human rights violations committed by IDF soldiers in the Occupied Territories, whose publication was forbidden by the military censorship. The leaflets were unsigned and at the time the party denied any connection with them. Only many years later did Uri Avnery, at the time Knesset member for Shelly, admit to having composed the leaflets and organised their distribution, stating that this act was justified since the censorship had abused its power to withhold information from the public.

== United States ==
Hate groups in the United States, often affiliated with the contemporary Ku Klux Klan movement, use fliers distributed anonymously at night as a recruitment technique and intimidation tactic. As of May 2024, a Southern Poverty Law Center database had catalogued over 27,000 individual instances of hate group flyering across the country.

On January 28, 2025, police in Sweetwater, Tennessee began to investigate "hate propaganda flyers" claiming to be from the Trinity White Knights of the Ku Klux Klan, a Kentucky-based hate group. The flyers, which had a cartoon depiction of Uncle Sam standing on a cage with people inside it, encouraged readers to "self-deport and avoid detention." William Bader, a Kentucky man who identified himself to journalists as the leader of the Trinity White Knights, claimed responsibility for the flyering campaign and expressed support for Tom Homan, the "border czar" overseeing the mass deportation of illegal immigrants in the second presidency of Donald Trump.

== See also ==
- Samizdat: a similar form of surreptitious dissident literature in the Soviet Union
