= Golestan Shohada of Isfahan =

One of the Iran's cemetery in Isfahan

- گلستان شهدای اصفهان
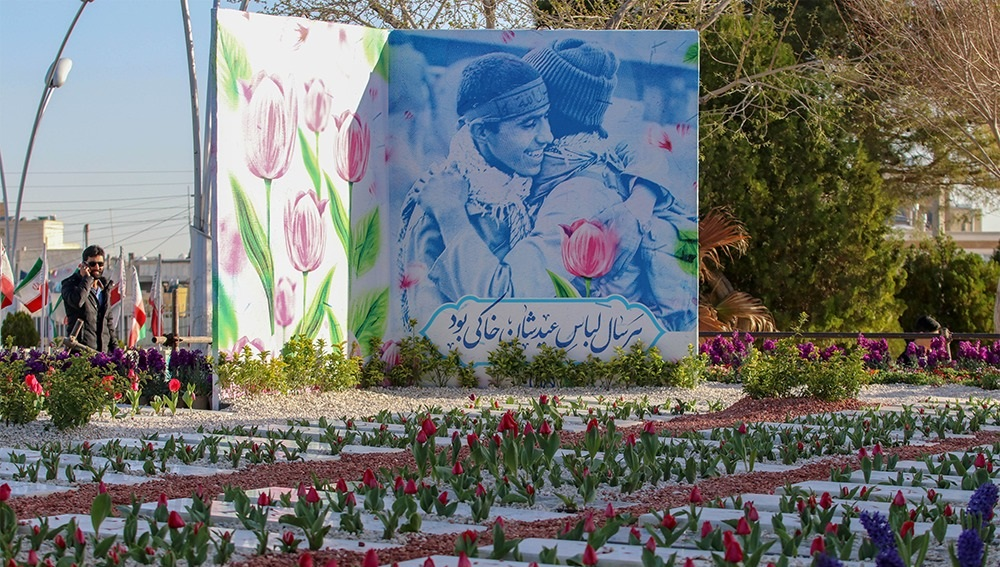
- Interactive map of Golestan Shohada of Isfahan

Details
- Established: April 28, 1976
- Location: Isfahan, Isfahan Province, Next to Takht-e Foulad
- Country: Iran
- Coordinates: 32.6275°N 51.683056°E
- Type: Public, Muslim, Veterans, Historic, National
- Style: Architectural, Artistic and Cultural style
- Owned by: Municipality of Isfahan
- Size: 113,969 square meters

Golestan Shahada of Isfahan is a cemetery in Isfahan, Iran which is located near Takht-e Foulad Mausoleum. People buried there include Mohammad Ali Naseri, Abdoldjavad Falaturi, Mohammad Reza Zahedi, Husayn Kharrazi, Ahmad Kazemi, Mahmoud Shahbazi, Akbar Agha Babaei, Mohammad Hejazi, Gholamreza Yazdani, Abdullah Maithami and Ata'ollah Ashrafi Esfahani. This cemetery was formed on April 28, 1976, with the burial of Abulhasan Shamsabadi.

== History ==
This mausoleum was formed next to the Takht-e Foulad. This cemetery was formed by the burial of Abulhasan Shamsabadi on April 28, 1976. In 1979, several people killed in the struggles of the Iranian revolution were buried in this cemetery.

Golestan Shahada is extended from the south side next to Sajjad street and on the west side next to Feiz street and on its north side to the alley of Lesan Ol-Arz and the alley of Shahid Zamani, all these corners are formed in a continuous zone with an area of 113,969 square meters.

This place has been the meeting place of the people of Isfahan and holding Du'a' Kumayl prayers on Friday nights. Even now, ritual and religious ceremonies are held in this cemetery, and there is also a cultural center next to it.

== Sections ==
Golestan Shahada is divided into sections, in each section specific people are buried. These sections are:

- Section of Hamzeh Seyyed ol-Shohada: in front of the entrance door of Golestan Shahada, next to the mausoleum of Abulhasan Shamsabadi. The number of people buried: 242 people, including: Hassan Beheshtinejad, Ali Akbar Ejehei (the victims of the bombing incident in the office of the Islamic Republic Party), Abdullah Maithami, Mohammad Hejazi, Mohsen Safavi and Habibullah Khalifeh Soltani.
- Section of Hanzaleh: in the west of the tomb of Ata'ollah Ashrafi Esfahani.
- Section of the Farmandehi Kole Qowa and Beit ol-Moqaddas
- Section of Samen-ol-A'emeh and Chazabeh
- Section of Tariq al-Quds: in the east of cemetery. The number of people buried: 457 people, including Valiullah Nikbakht and Abbas Kordabadi.
- Section of Fath-ul-Mobin, Beit ol-Moqaddas and Ramazan: in the south of Golestan Shahada and on the west side of the entrance door.
- Section of Habib ibn Mazaher: in the southwest of the tomb of Ata'ollah Ashrafi Esfahani.
- Sections of Muharram: four separate sections in the south of the Prophet Joshua's tomb in Lesan Al-Arz. The number of people buried: 601 people, including Akbar Agha Babaei and Mohammad Reza Afioni.
- Sections of Valfajr: in the easternmost point of Golestan Shahada.
- Sections of Shohadaye Kheibar: In the north of Golestan, the buried, including Abdorrasul Zarrin.
- Section of Shohadaye Gharb
- Section of Shohadaye Badr
- Section of Shohadaye Ghader
- Section of Shohadaye Gomnam
- Section of Shohadaye Karbalaye 5 (known as Farmandehan section): in the northwest of Golestan Shahada. The number of buried people: 322 people, including Husayn Kharrazi, Mohammad Reza Zahedi, Ahmad Kazemi, Ali Quchani, Hassan Ghazi, Gholamreza Yazdani, Abbas Ali Jan Nesari, Mohammad Reza Habibbullahi and Hossein Kuhrangiha.
- Section of Shohadaye Beit ol-Allah el-Haram: the burial place of those killed in the massacre of pilgrims in Mecca (1987), the Mena disaster (2015) and the Holy Shrine Defender, including Hossein Rezaei, Moslem Khizab and Ali Shahsanaei.

== Gallery ==
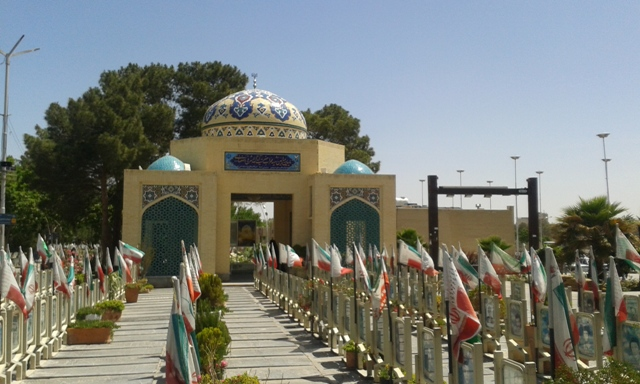
The tomb of Ata'ollah Ashrafi Esfahani

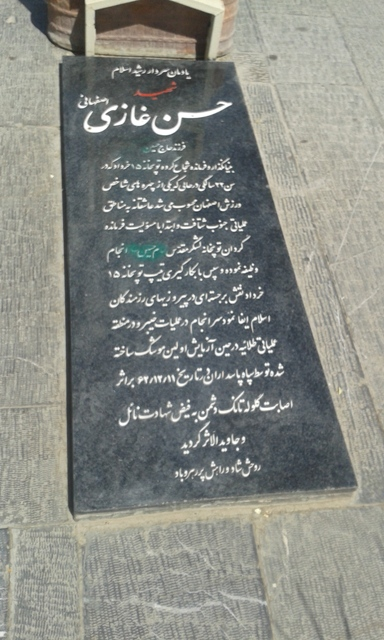
Grave of Hassan Ghazi

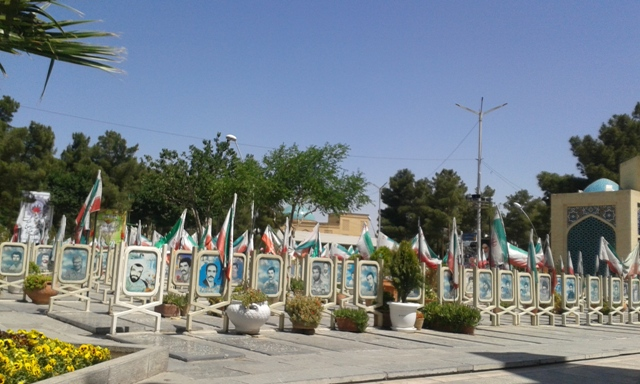
Entrance sections of Golestan Shahada

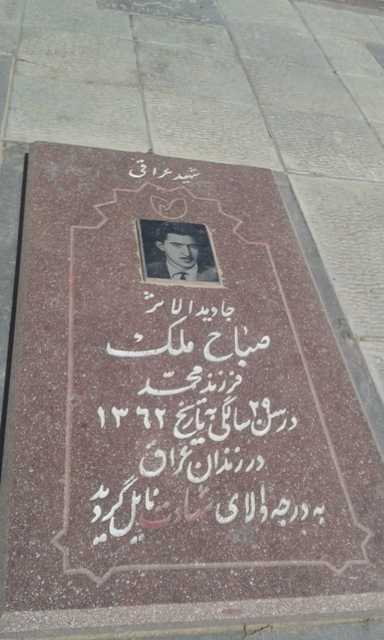
The memorial stone

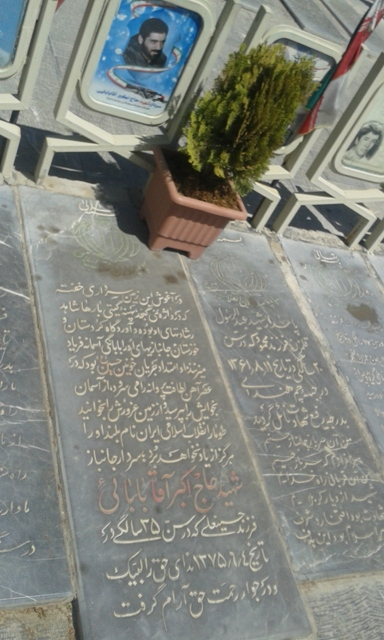
The grave of Akbar Agha Babaei

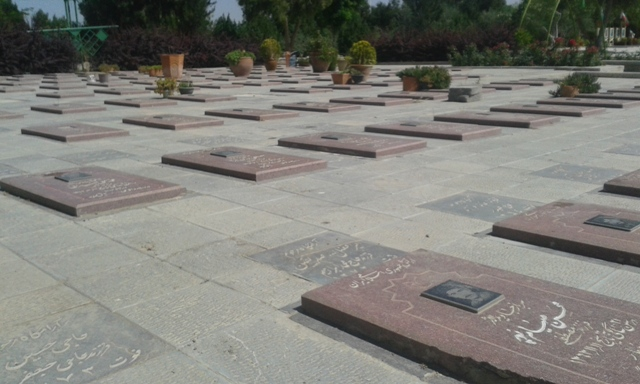
A view of the martyrs' graves

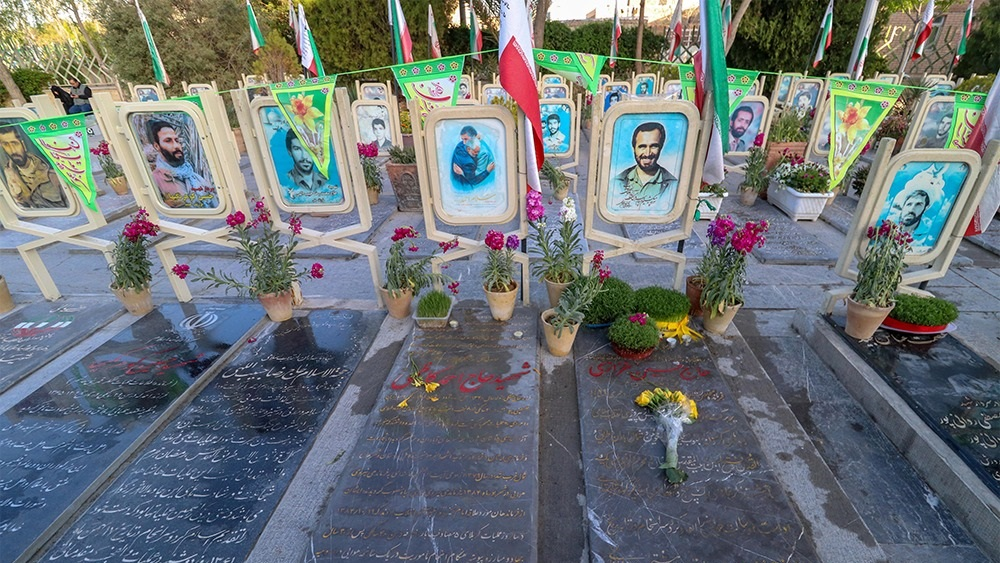
The graves of Husayn Kharrazi and Ahmad Kazemi

== See also ==
- Mausoleum of Ruhollah Khomeini
- Behesht-e Zahra
- List of cemeteries in Iran
- Sheikhan cemetery
- Doulab Cemetery
- Ibn Babawayh Cemetery
- Imamzadeh Abdollah, Ray
- Golzar Shohada of Qom
- Imamzadeh Ali ibn Jafar
