= List of cemeteries in Iran =

- Ebn-e Babveih Cemetery – Tehran (Rey)
- Emamazadeh Abdullah Cemetery – Tehran (Ray)
- Behesht-e Zahra – Tehran
- Emamzadeh Taher Cemetery – Karaj
- Behesht-e Sakineh Cemetery – Karaj
- Doulab Christian Cemetery – Tehran (Doulab)
- Nor Burastan Cemetery – Tehran (Khavaran)
- Tehran War Cemetery – Tehran (Gholhak)
- Tehran Protestant Cemetery – Tehran (Old Qom Road)
- Zahir-od-dowleh cemetery – Tajrish
- Khavaran Cemetery – Tehran
- Mesgarabad Cemetery – Tehran
- Golestan-e Javid Baha'i Cemetery – Tehran
- Beheshtieh Jewish Cemetery – Tehran
- Giliard Jewish Cemetery – Giliard
- Takht-e Foulad Cemetery – Isfahan
- Golestan Shohada of Isfahan – Isfahan
- New Julfa Armenian Cemetery – New Julfa, Isfahan
- Bagh- Rezvan Cemetery (fa) – Isfahan
- Sarah bat Asher Cemetery – Isfahan (Lenjan)
- Dar ol-Salaam Cemetery (fa) fa:دارالسلام شیراز – Shiraz
- Vadi-e Rahmat – Tabriz
- Maqbarat ol-Sho'ara – Tabriz
- Sheikhan cemetery (fa) – Qom
- Golzar Shohada of Qom – Qom
- Bagh-e Ferdows (fa) – Kermanshah
