= Mohammad Ali Modarres Khiabani =

Iranian author, mojtahed and scholar

Coordinates: 34°38′33.5″N 50°52′53.7″E

- محمدعلی مدرس خیابانی
- Born: Mohammad Ali Ibn Mohammad Taher Ibn Nader Ibn Mohammad Taher Tabrizi, 1878; Tabriz, East Azerbaijan province, Qajar Iran
- Died: 5 April 1954 (aged 75–76); Tabriz, East Azerbaijan province, Pahlavi Iran
- Burial place: Qom, Sheikhan cemetery
- Occupations: Author; Scholar; Biographer
- Known for: Modarres Khiabani Tabrizi

Mohammad Ali Ibn Mohammad Taher Ibn Nader Ibn Mohammad Taher Tabrizi or Mohammad Ali Modarres Khiabani or Mohammad Ali Modarres Tabrizi was an Iranian author, mojtahed and scholar. He was born in 1878 in Tabriz, East Azerbaijan Province, Iran and died on 5 April 1954 in Tabriz, East Azerbaijan Province, Iran and buried in Sheikhan cemetery, Qom, Iran.

== Life and educations ==
Mirza Mohammad Ali Modarres Khiabani was born in 1878 in Tabriz, East Azerbaijan Province, Iran. He went to Talibiyeh School in Tabriz to study the basics of Arabic sciences and to study the books of jurisprudence, principles and mathematics. He studied with the famous masters of that time. After that, he studied intellectual sciences with Mirza Ali Lankarani. He studied Ijtihad courses and Islamic principles in the school of Mirza Abolhassan Angji. He also spent some courses in the seminary of Mirza Sadegh Mojtahed Tabrizi.

After completing his education, Modarres Tabrizi received permission for ijtihad from the authorities of that time, such as Seyyed Mohammad Hojjat Kooh Kamari, Sadr al-Din al-Sadr, Mohammad Ali Shahabadi Tehrani, Mohammad Hossein Kashif al-Ghatta, and Mirza Abdolhossein Rashti.

Also, scholars such as Hibatuddin Shahrestani, Agha Bozorg Tehrani, and Muhsin al-Hakim allowed him to lecture and teach.

In the last years of his life, Modarres Khiabani was active in the Shahid Motahari University in Tehran and discussed, wrote and researched there for twelve years.

He also trained many students, the most famous of whom are Mohammad Khiabani, Mehdi Mohaghegh and Ahmad Mahdavi Damghani.

== Death ==
Mohammad Ali Modarres Khiabani died on 5 April 1954 at the age of 76 in Tabriz, after which his body was transferred to Qom and buried in Sheikhan Cemetery.

== Bibliography ==
His most important works are:

- Kefayat al-Mohasselin fi Tabsarate Ahkam al-Din (title means The adequacy of the students in understanding laws of Islam) in 2 volumes, Arabic, 1935
- Hiaz al-Zalael fi Riaz al-Masael (title means The Useful points of Riyadh al-Masael book), Arabic, 1906
- Al-Dorr al-Samin aow Divan al-Masoumin (title means The precious gem or divan of infallible), Arabic, republished 2005
- Qayat al-Mena fi Tahqiq al-Kena (title means All meanings for research in epithets), In the expression of animal nicknames, Arabic, 1913
- Al-Tohfat al-Mahdavieh (title means Masterpiece of Mahdavi), about the history of Islam and Imamate, Arabic, 1935
- Reyhanat Al-Adab (title means Useful literary information), in 8 volumes with the biographies of more than five thousand scholars and scholars, Persian, 1947
- Farhange Nobahar (title means Nobahar lexicon), Persian to Persian dictionary with 19443 words in 2 volumes, Persian, 1929
- Farhange Baharestan (title means Baharestan lexicon), Includes Persian synonyms, Persian, 1930
- Farhange Negarestan (title means Negarestan lexicon), in 5 volumes, Persian, 1931
- Qamous al-Ma'aref (title means Dictionary of Knowledges), an encyclopedia containing 45,000 entries in religious, philosophical, theological, mathematical and astronomical terms in 7 volumes, Persian, 1911–1926
- Dastour Zabane Farsi (title means Persian grammar), This book was an article in the introduction of his Qamous al-Ma'aref book, Persian, republished 2009
- Nasr al-Leali dar Sharhe Nazm al-Leali (title means Explain the poem book of al-Leali), Persian, 1944
- Amsal va Hokame Torkie Azarbayejani (title means Azerbaijani Turkish proverbs and verdicts), Persian, republished 2015

== See also ==
- Mohammad Taghi Modarres Razavi
- Mahmoud Ansari Qomi
