= Imamzadeh Ali ibn Jafar =

Religious monument in Qom, Iran

- امامزاده علی بن جعفر
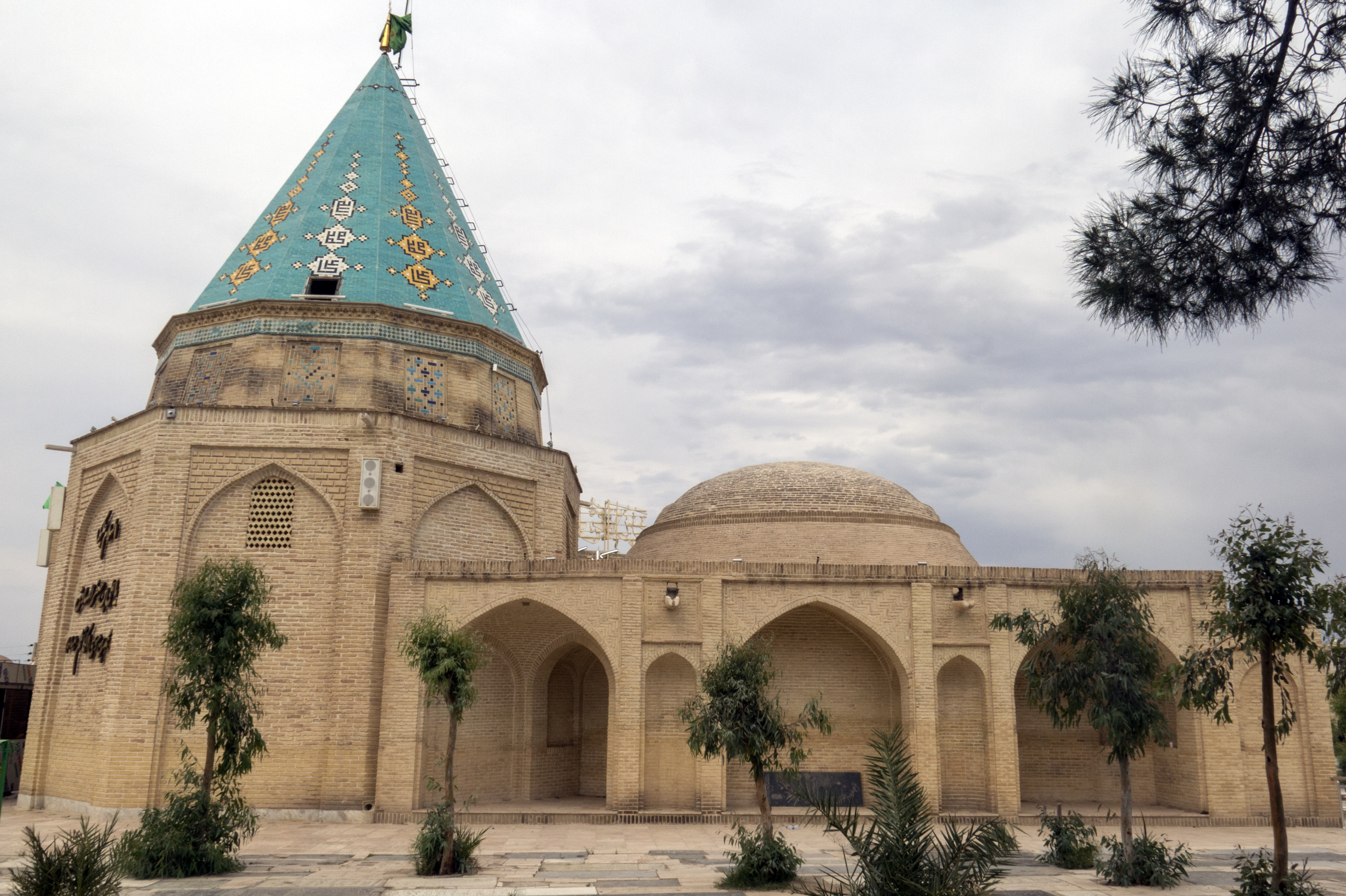
- Imamzadeh Ali ibn Jafar

- Location of the complex in Iran

Religion
- Affiliation: Shia (Twelver)
- Ecclesiastical or organisational status: Imamzadeh and mausoleum
- Status: Active

Location
- Location: Next to the Golzar Shohada of Qom, Qom
- Country: Iran
- Interactive map of Imamzadeh Ali ibn Jafar
- Coordinates: 34°37′51″N 50°53′51″E

Architecture
- Type: Islamic architecture
- Style: Seljuk; Ilkhanid
- Completed: 1061 CE (tomb); 1307 CE (mausoleum); 1340 CE (façade)

Specifications
- Dome: One
- Spire: One

Iran National Heritage List
- Official name: Emamzadeh Ali ibn Jafar
- Type: Emamzadeh
- Designated: 1935
- Part of: Golzar Shohada of Qom
- Reference no.: 240
- Conservation organization: Cultural Heritage, Handicrafts and Tourism Organization of Iran

The Imamzadeh Ali ibn Jafar (Persian: امامزاده علی بن جعفر) is a Twelver Shi'ite imamzadeh and mausoleum, located on Enghelab Street (Chahar Mardan), next to the Golzar Shohada, in the city of Qom, Iran. The tomb was completed in 1061 CE (the 8th century AH) and further additions made until 1340 CE in the Seljuk and Ilkhanid styles.

The complex was added to the Iran National Heritage List on 7 December 1935, administered by the Cultural Heritage, Handicrafts and Tourism Organization of Iran.

== Overview ==
Abbas Qomi stated in the book Muntahi al-Ama that Ali ibn Jafar, a respectable and polite gentleman, was extremely pious. He was a great scholar, a hadith narrator, and possessed great grace. He served elders like Imam Muhammad al-Jawad. According to the author of the major book Omdat ol-Mataleb, Ali ibn Jafar also served Imam Ali al-Hadi; that is, he understood the life of the five Shia Imams and continuously supported his honorable brother, Imam Musa al-Kazim. Ali ibn Jafar obtained permission from his brother, Imam Musa al-Kazim, to narrate the religious courses and Prophet Muhammad's sayings to those interested.

== Gallery ==
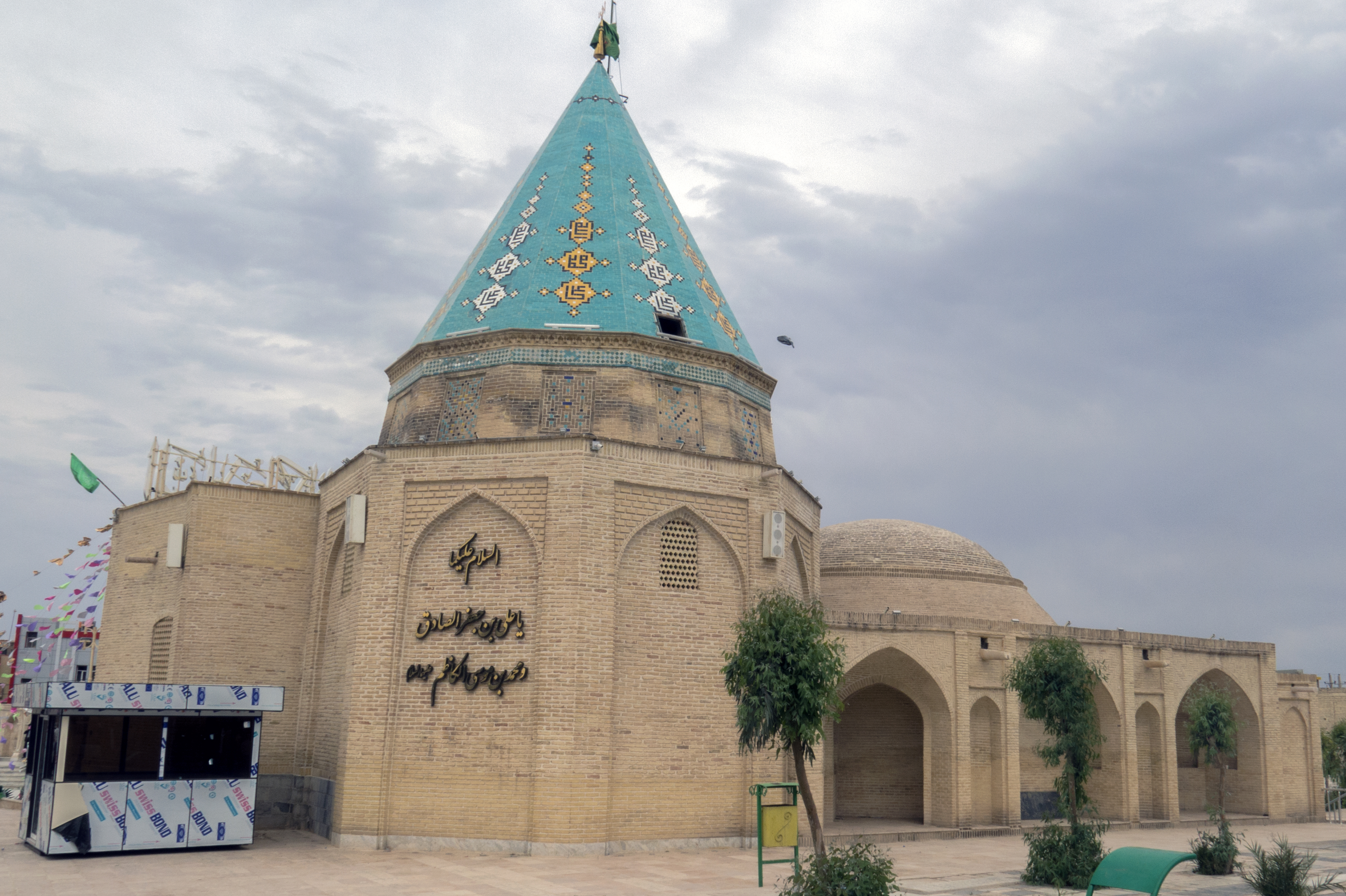

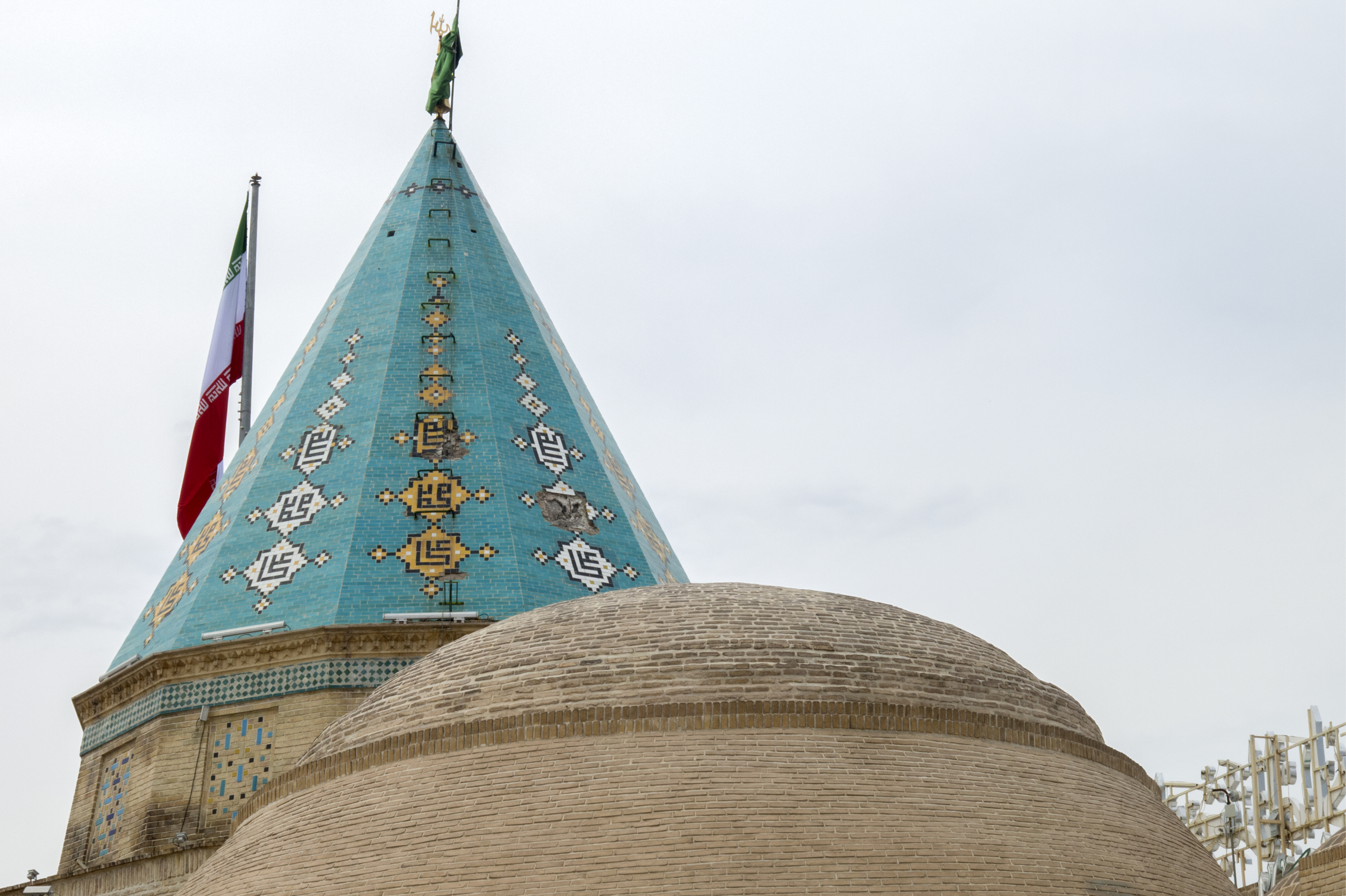

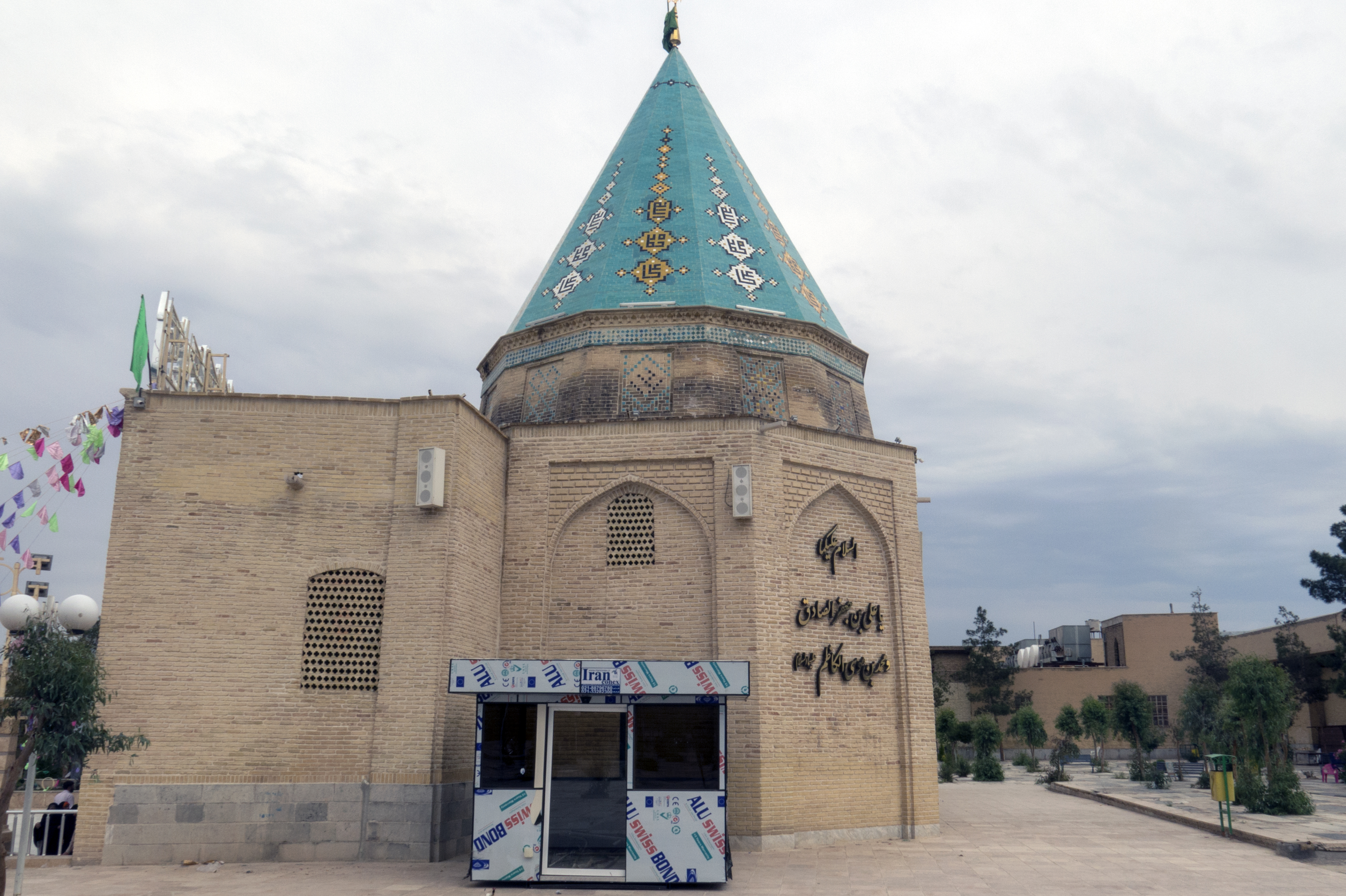

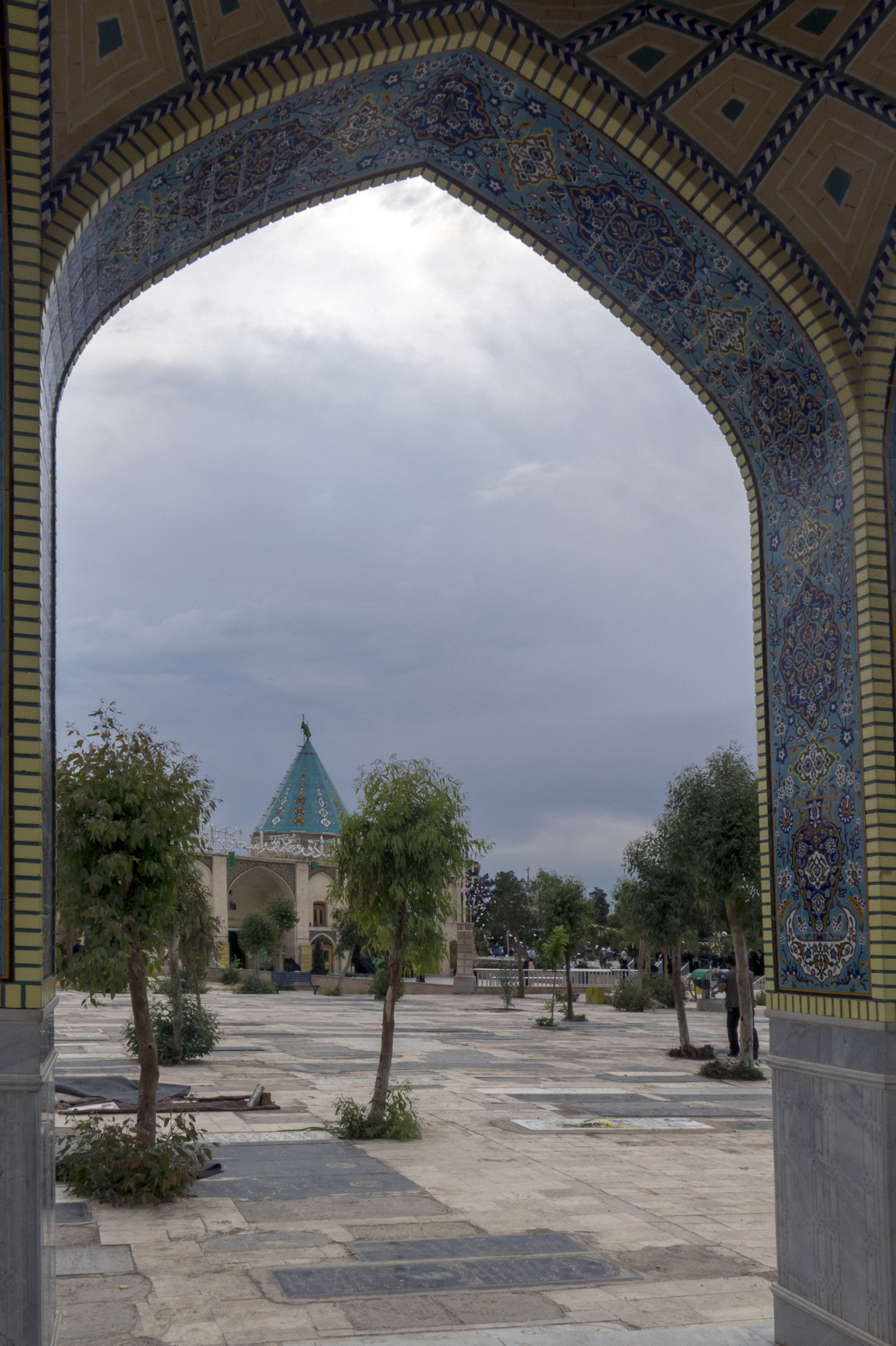

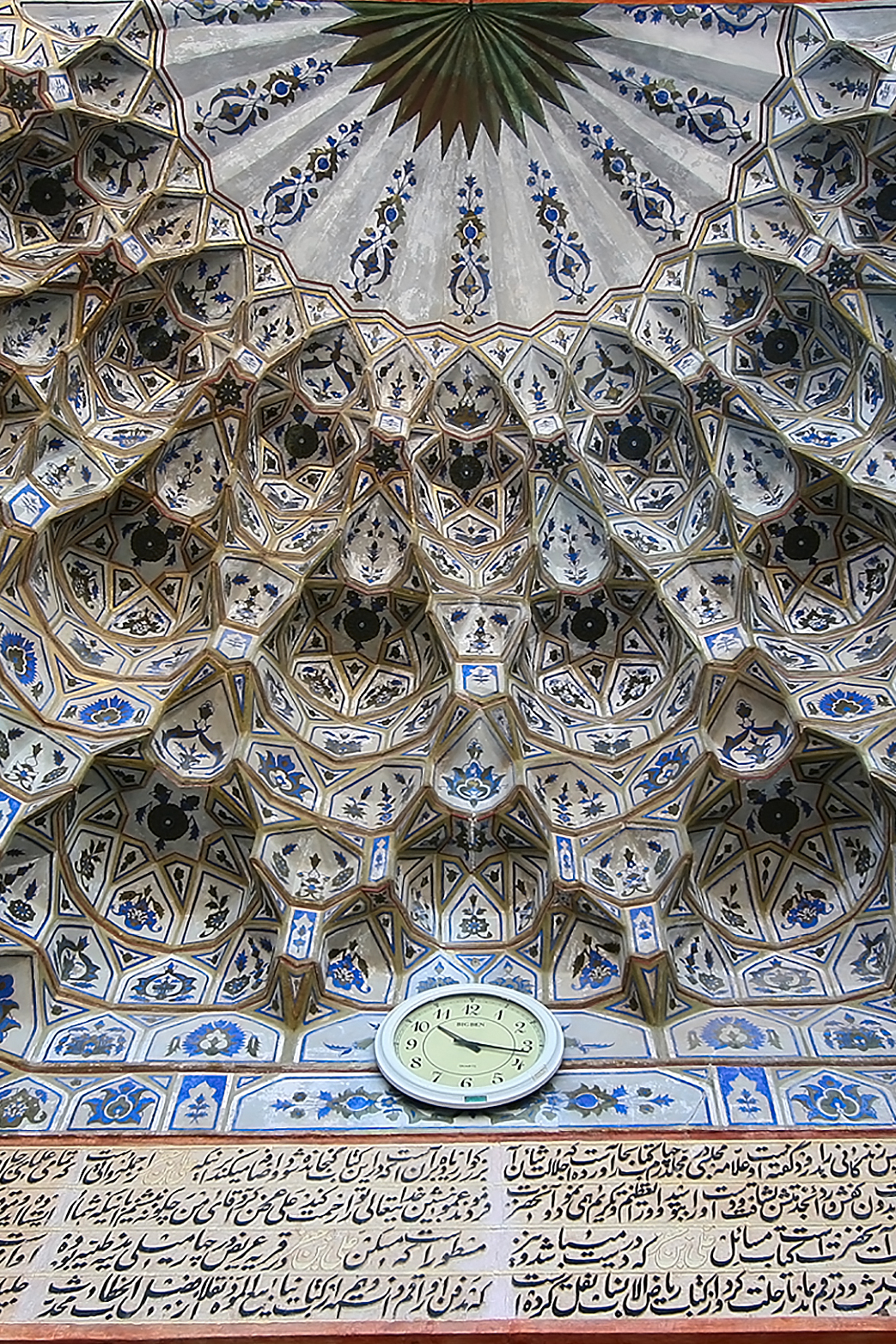

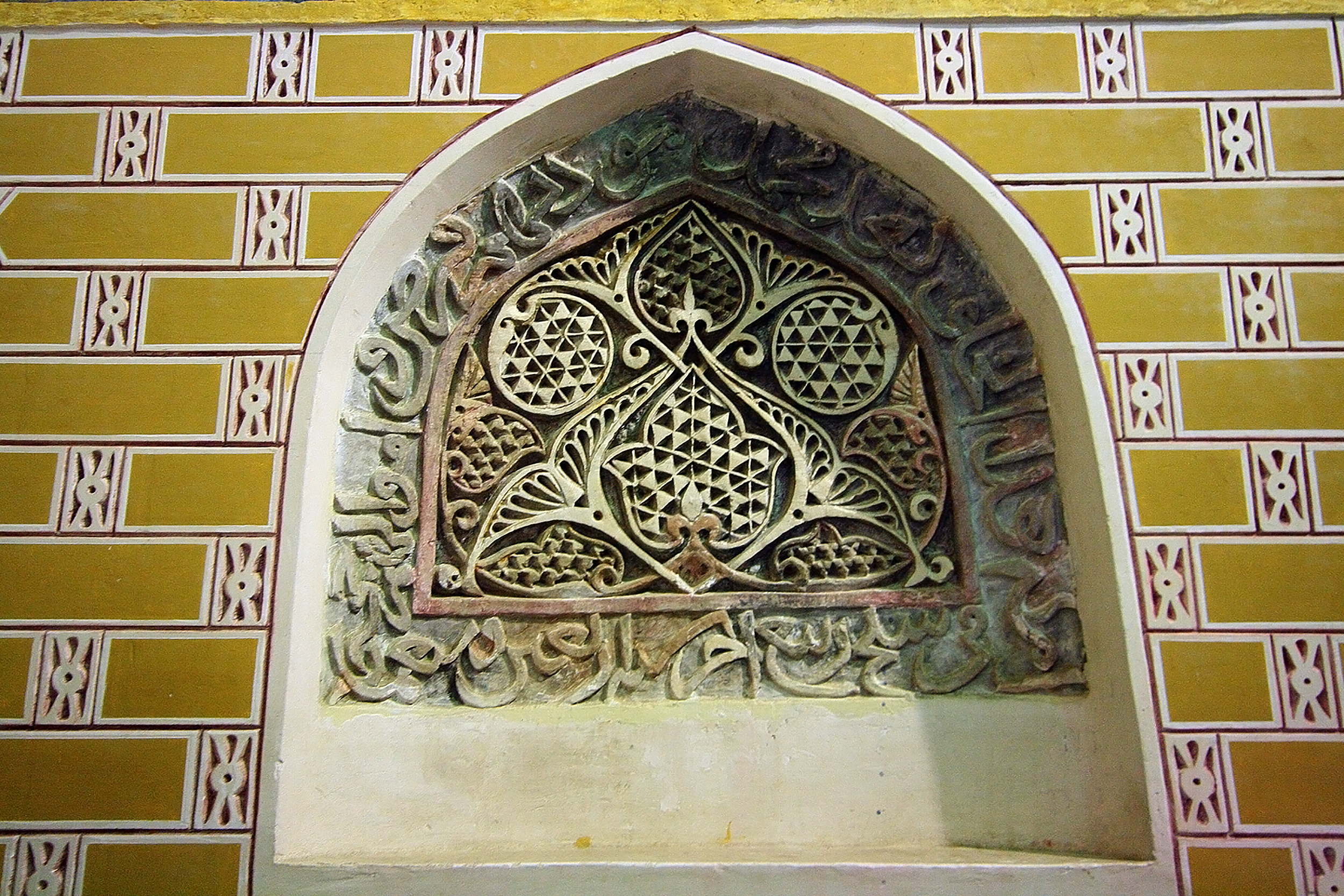

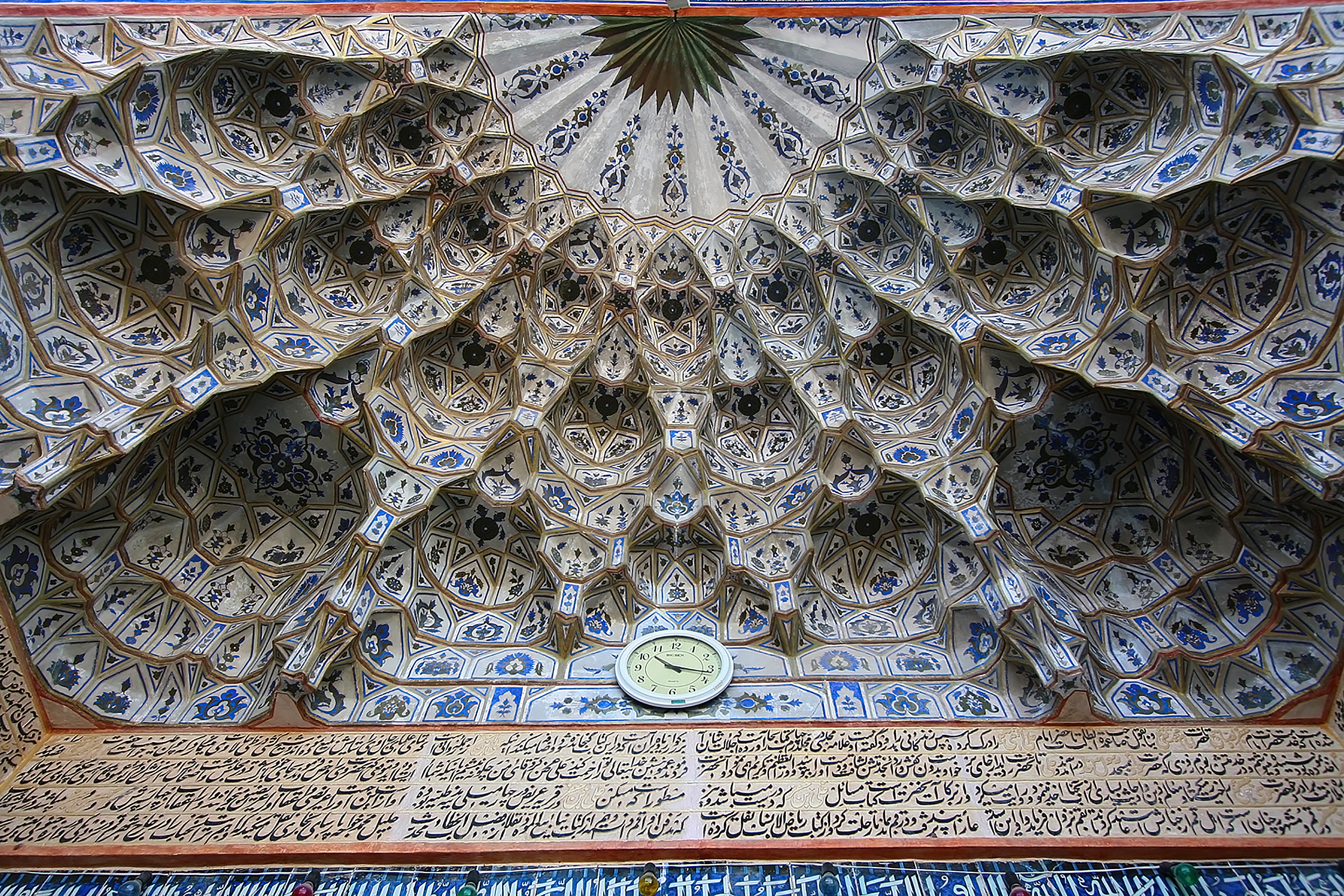

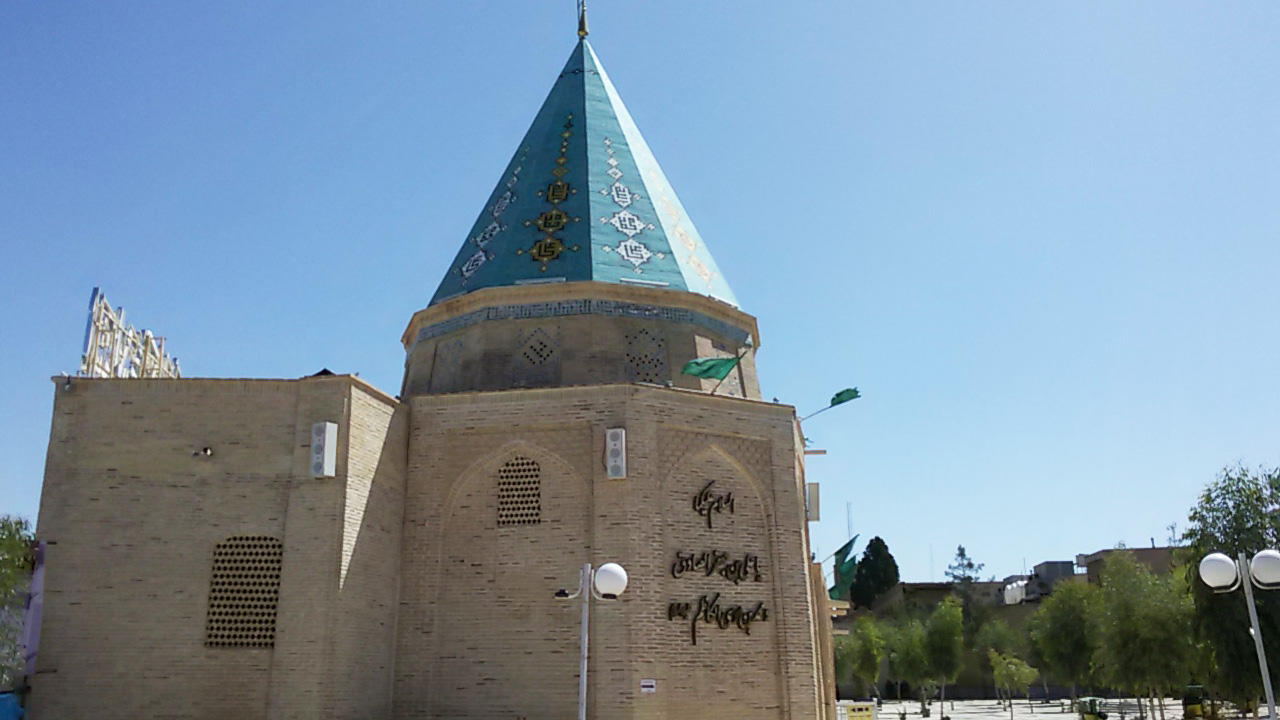

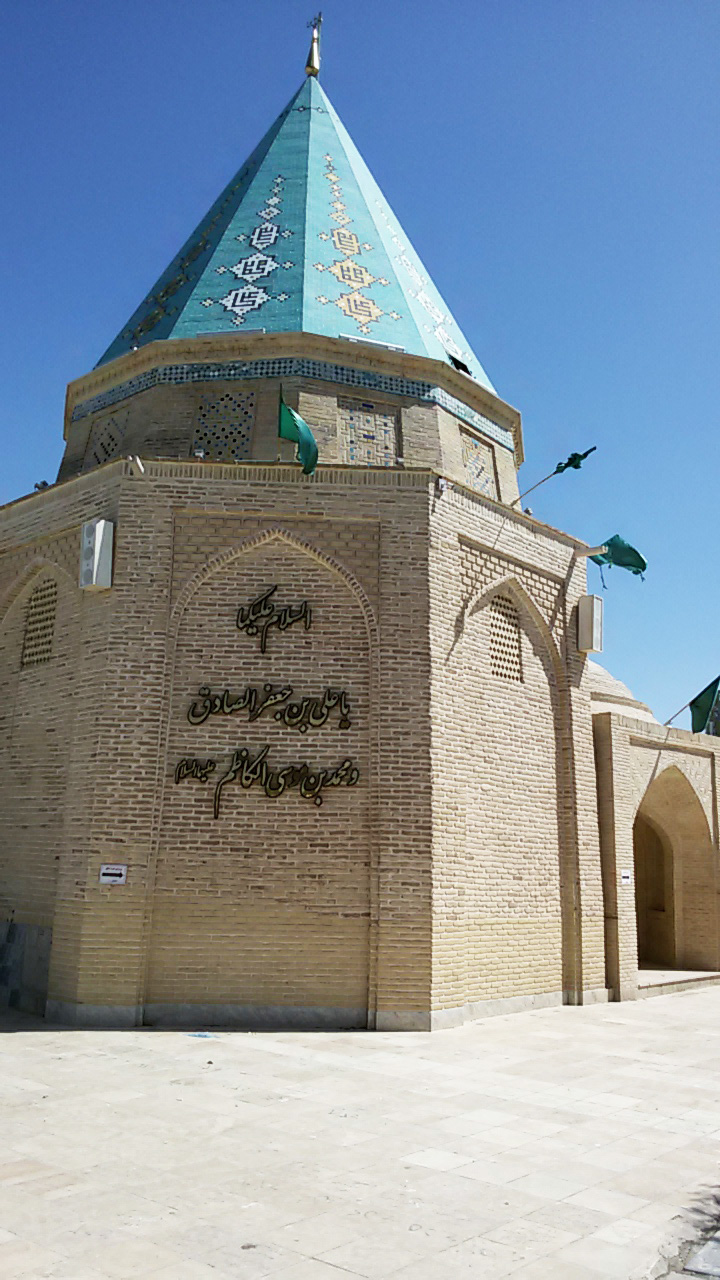

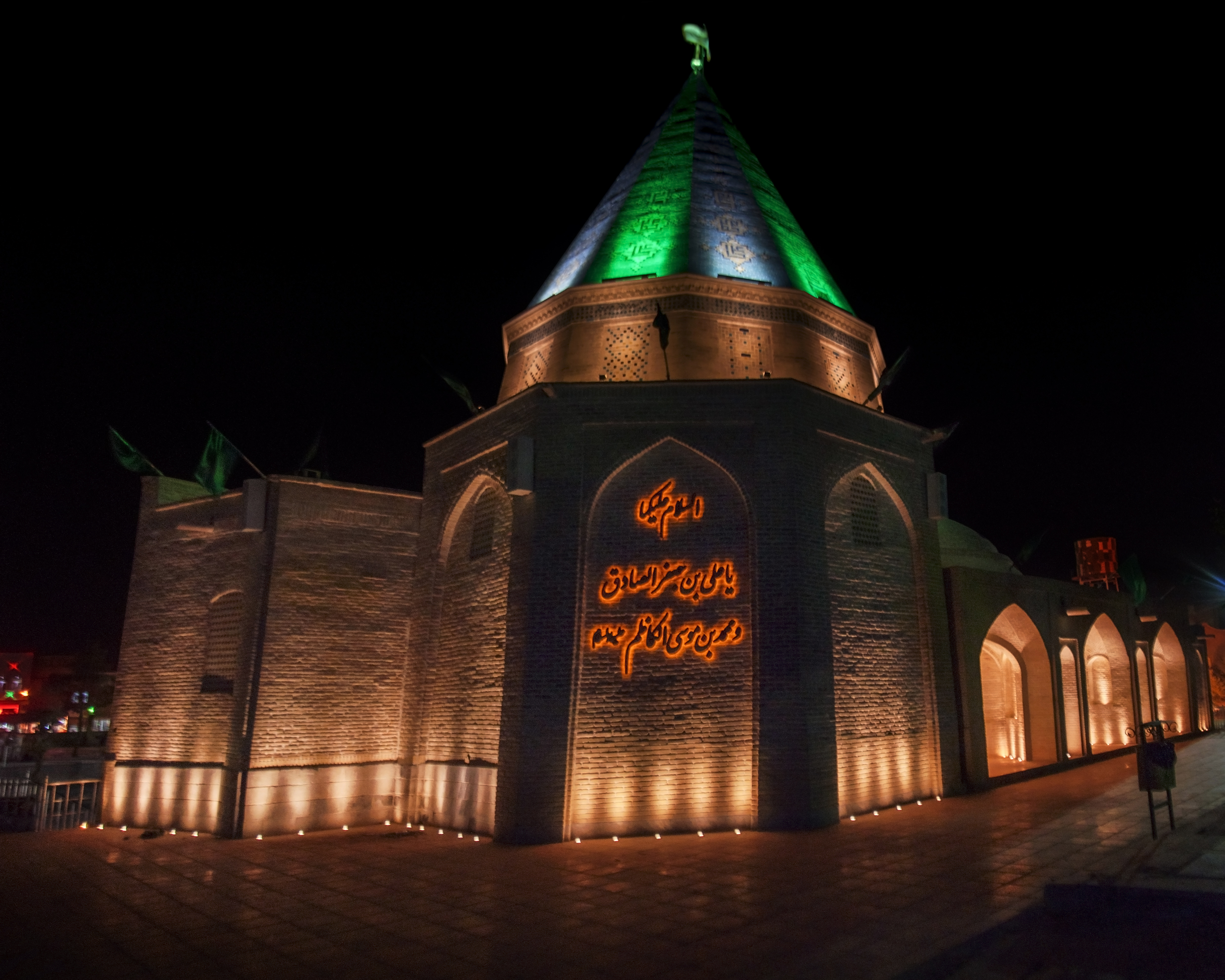

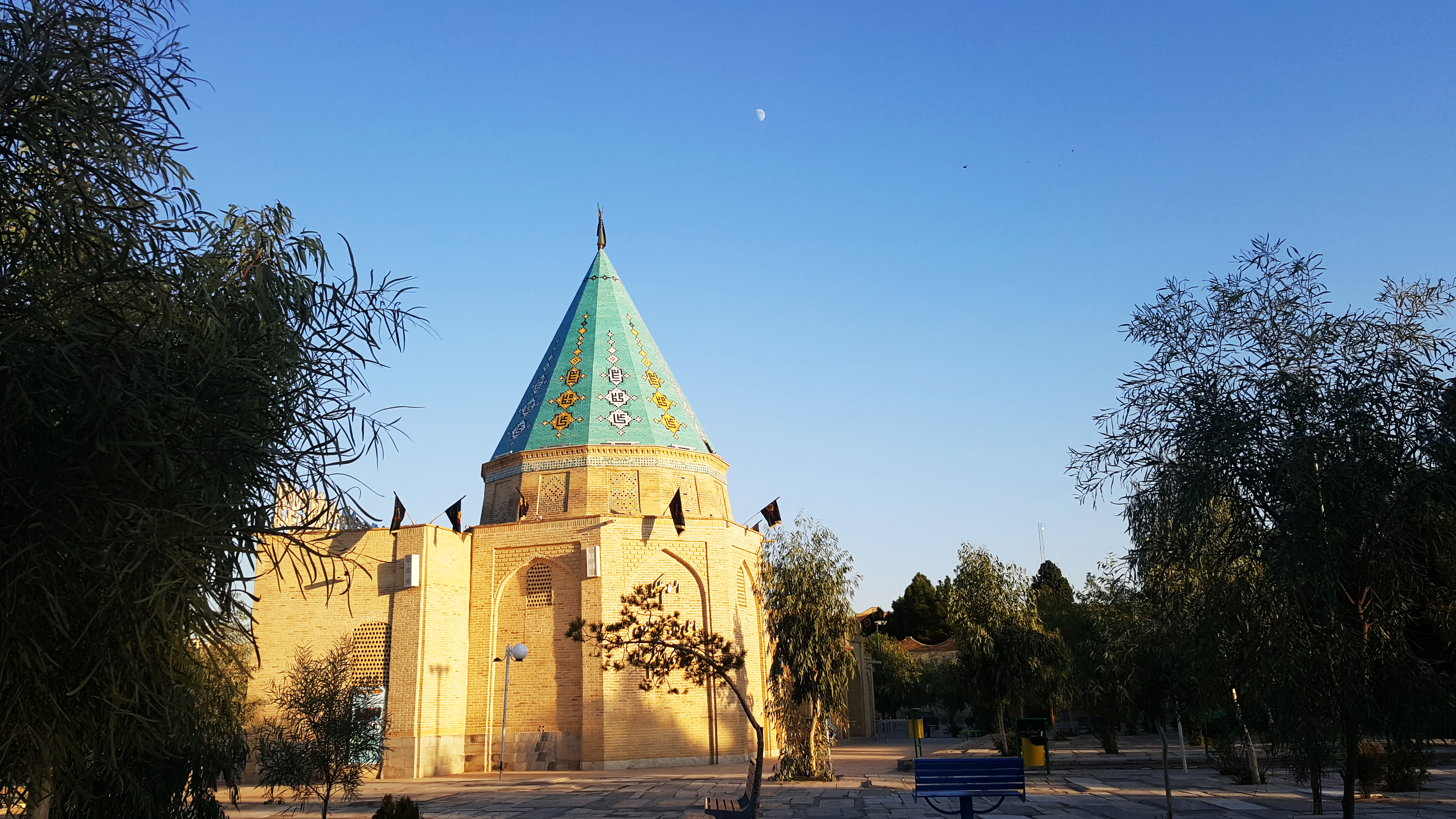

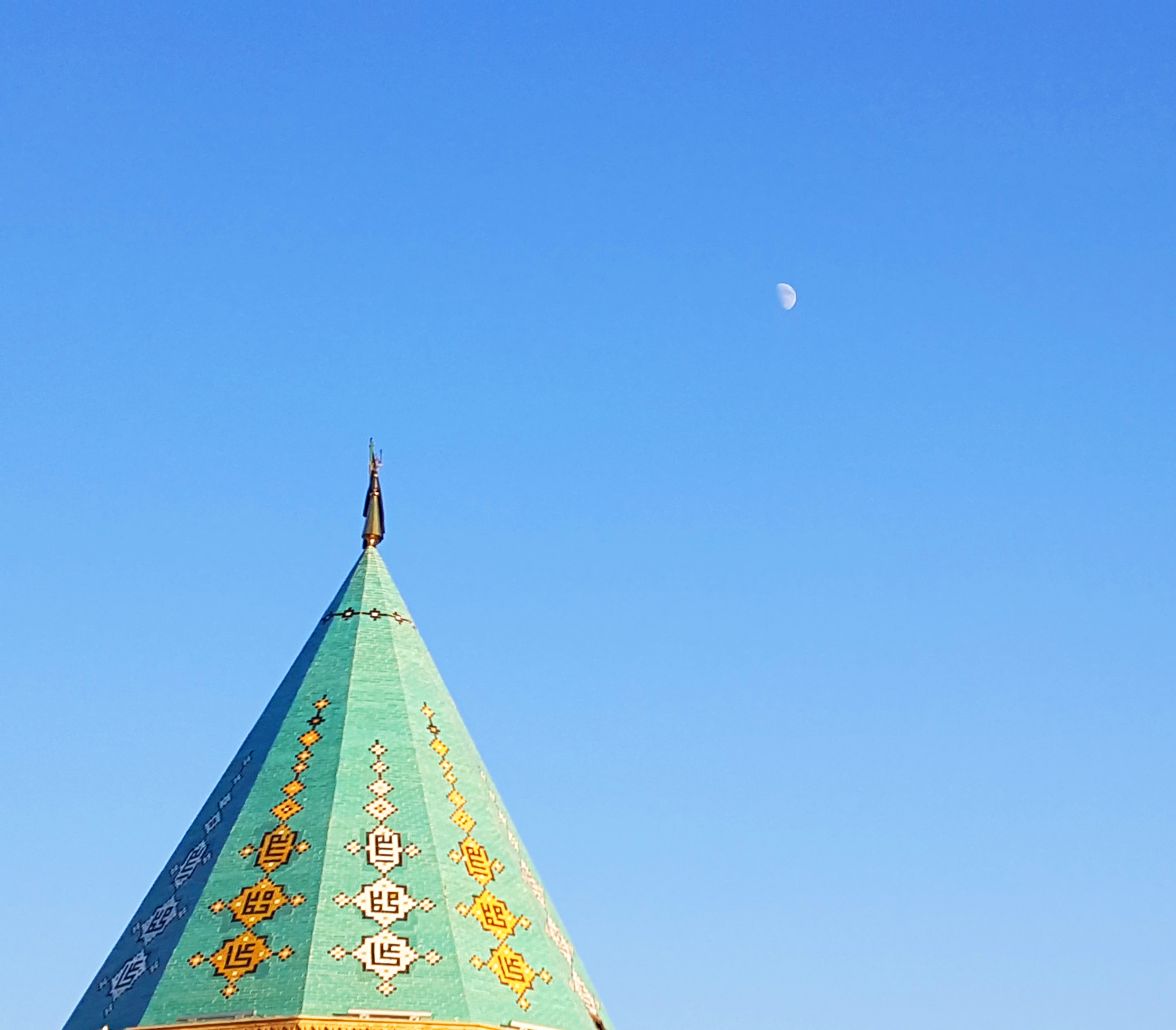

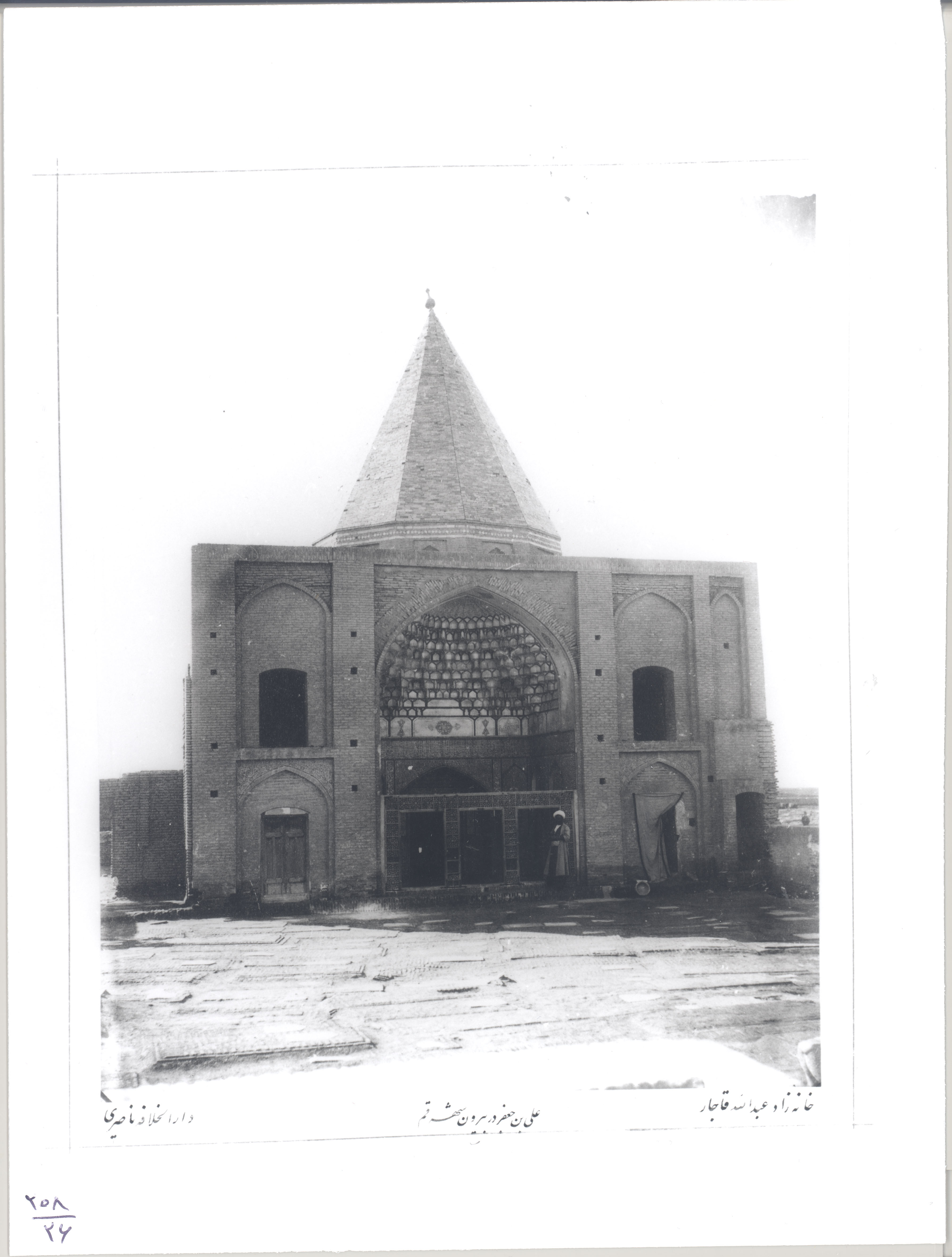

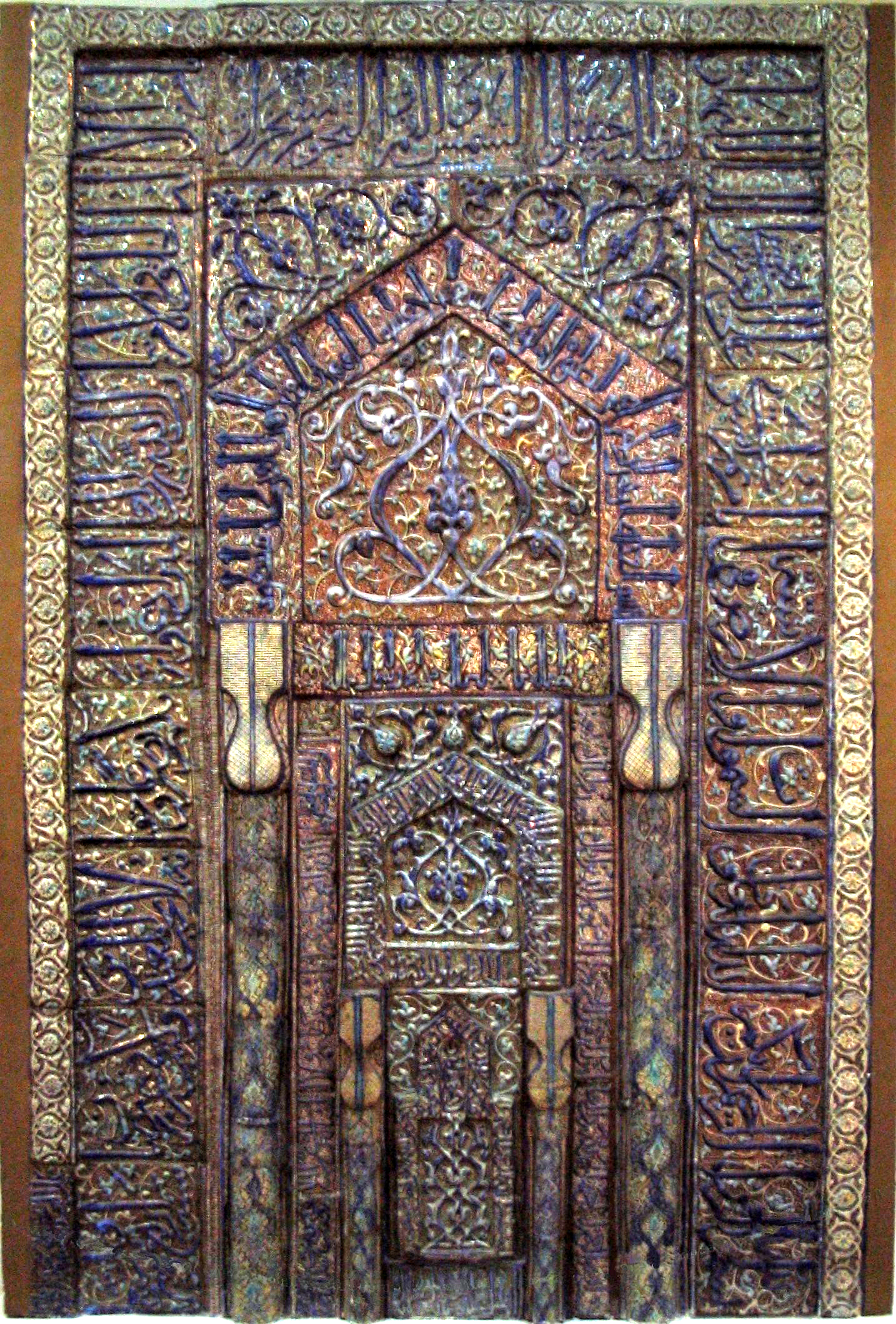
The original Ilkhanid luster mihrab now housed in the National Museum of Iran

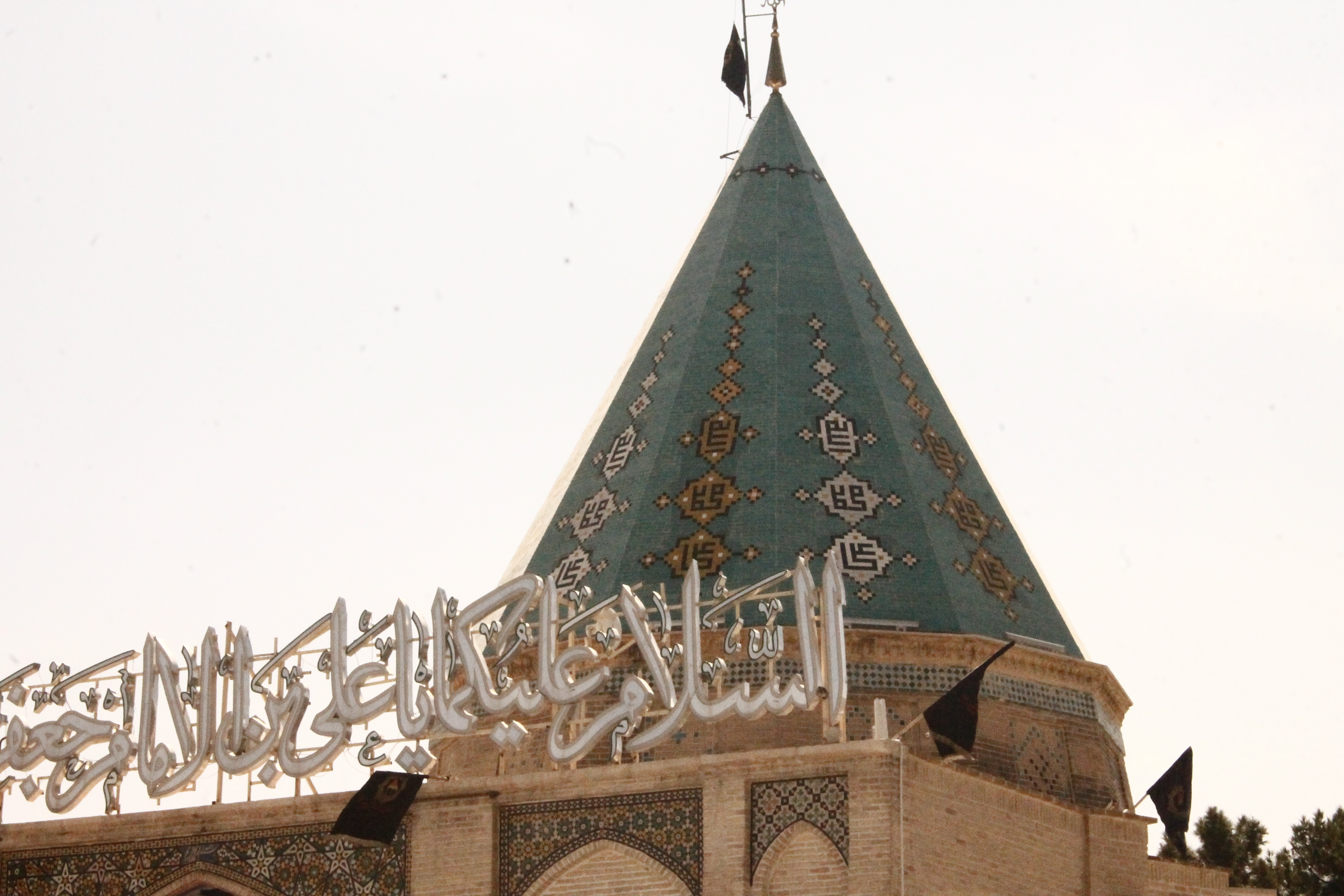

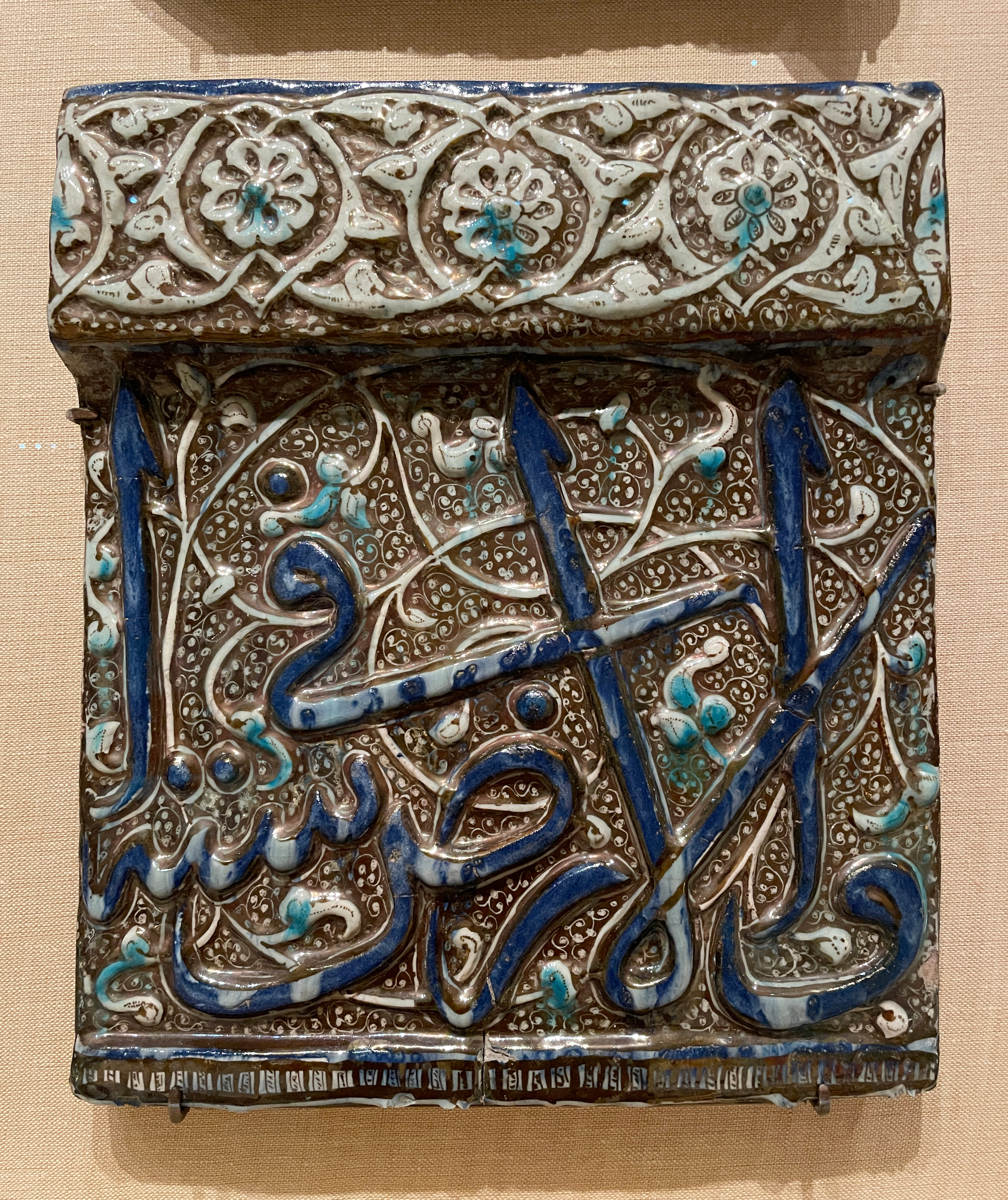
Original tile fragment from the inscriptional frieze around the mihrab now in the MET

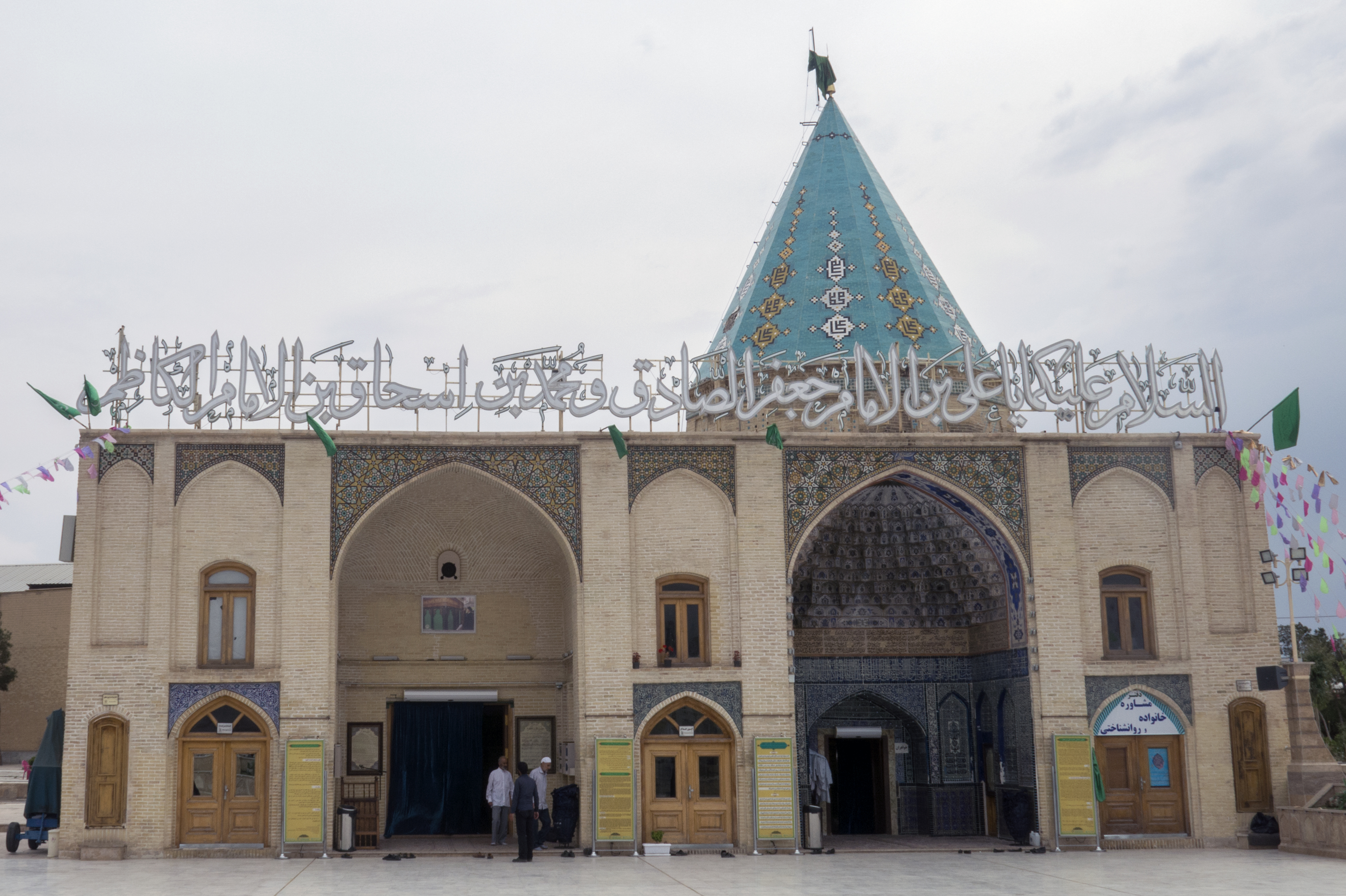

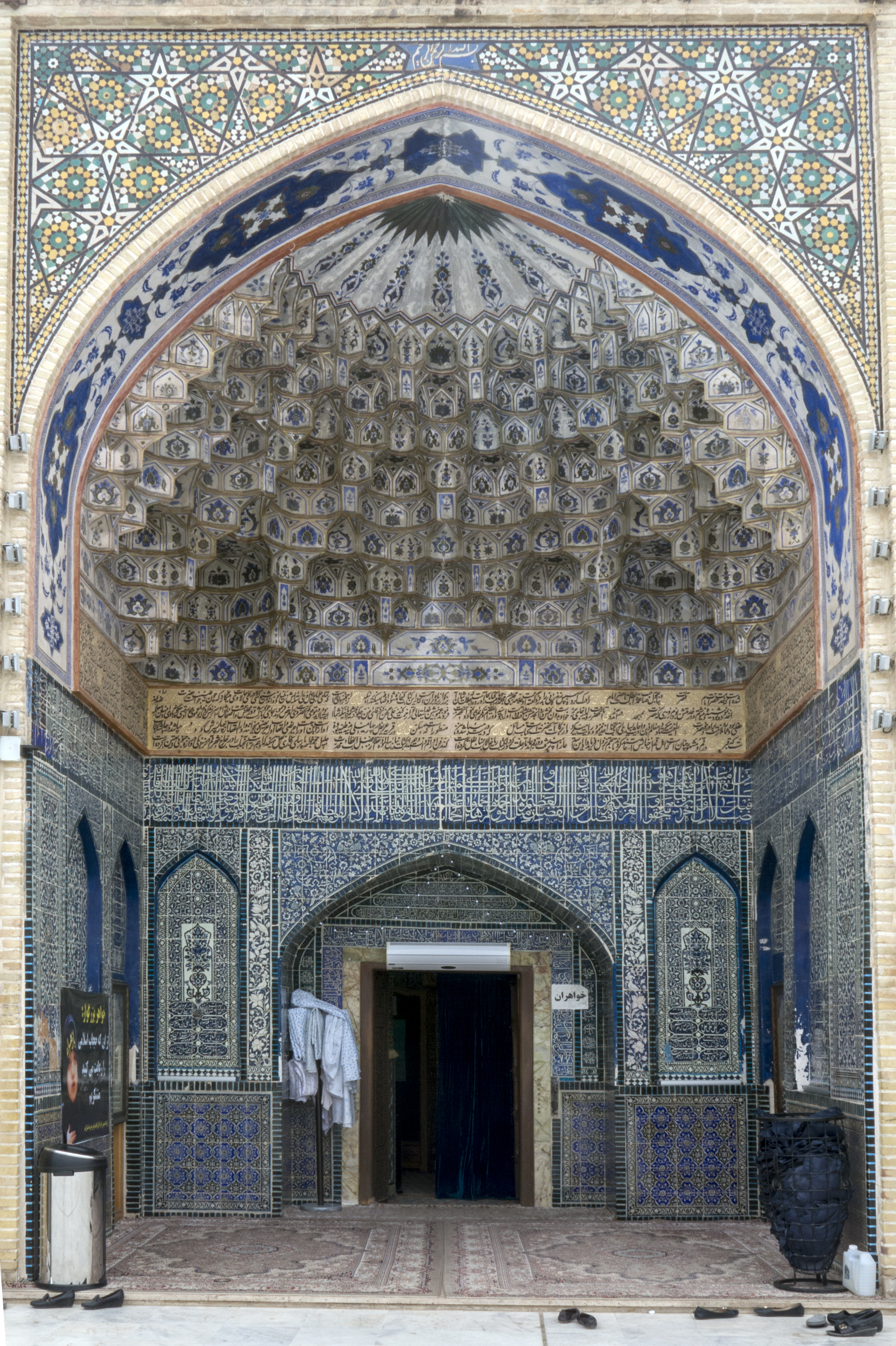

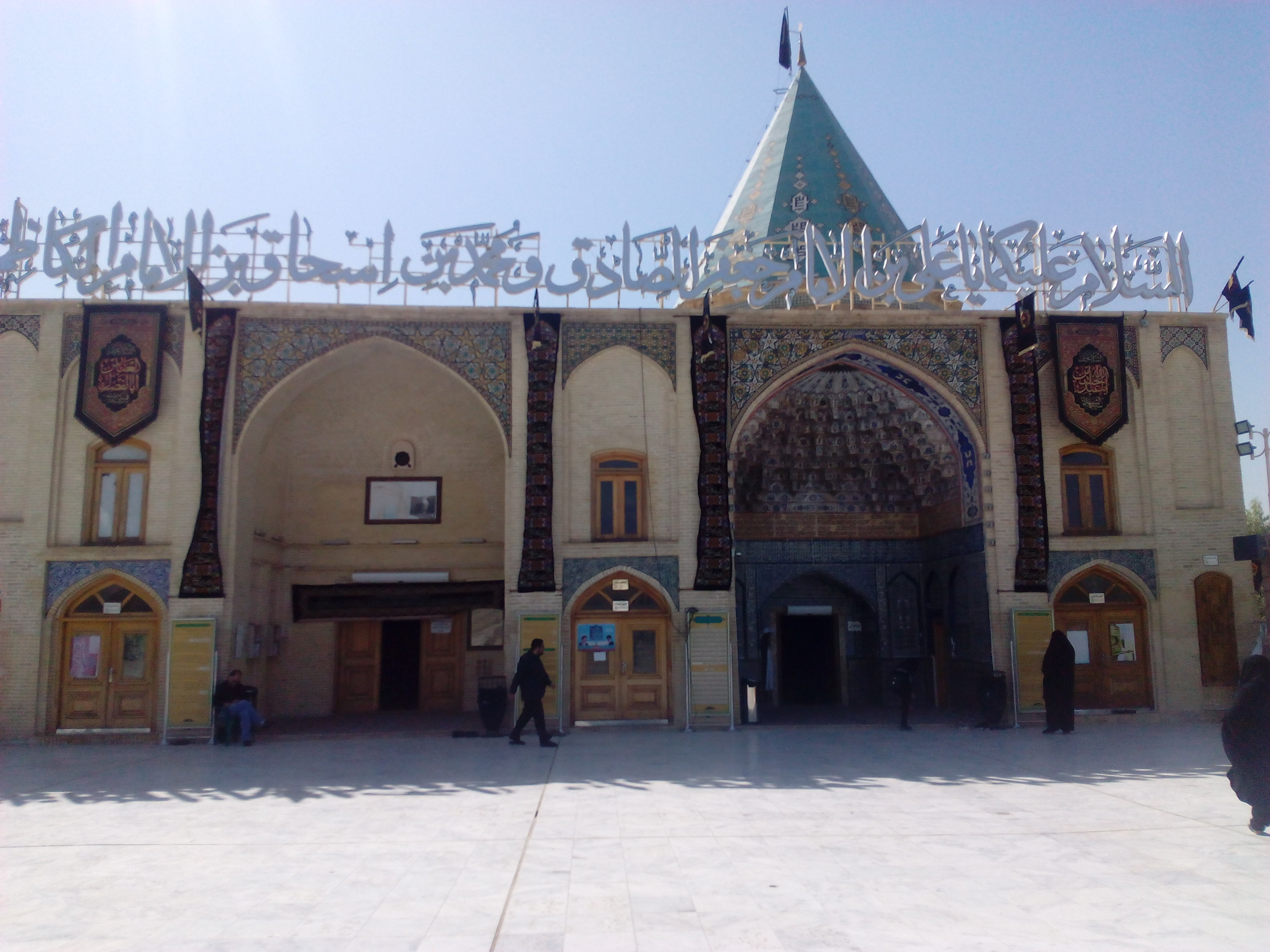

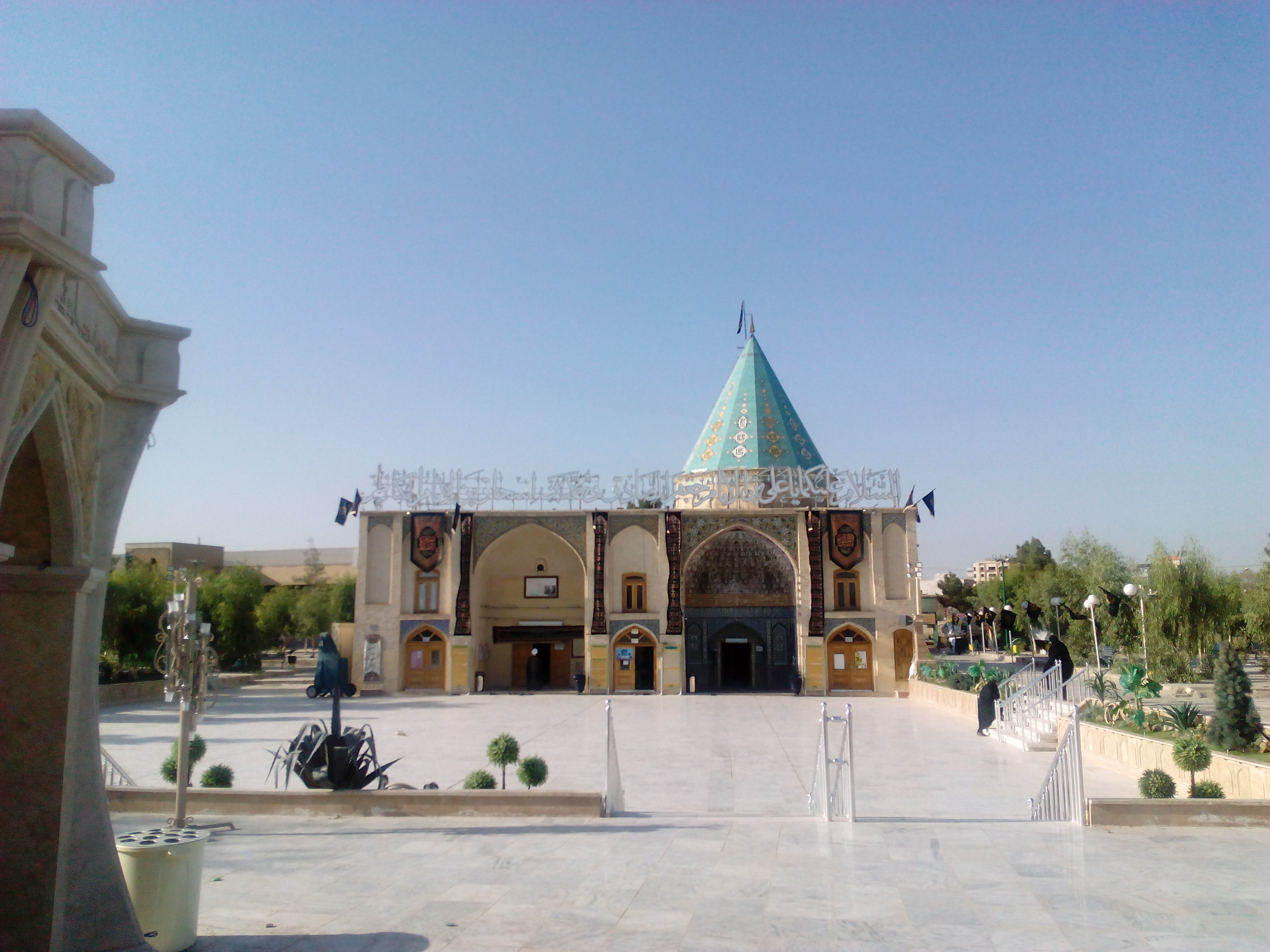

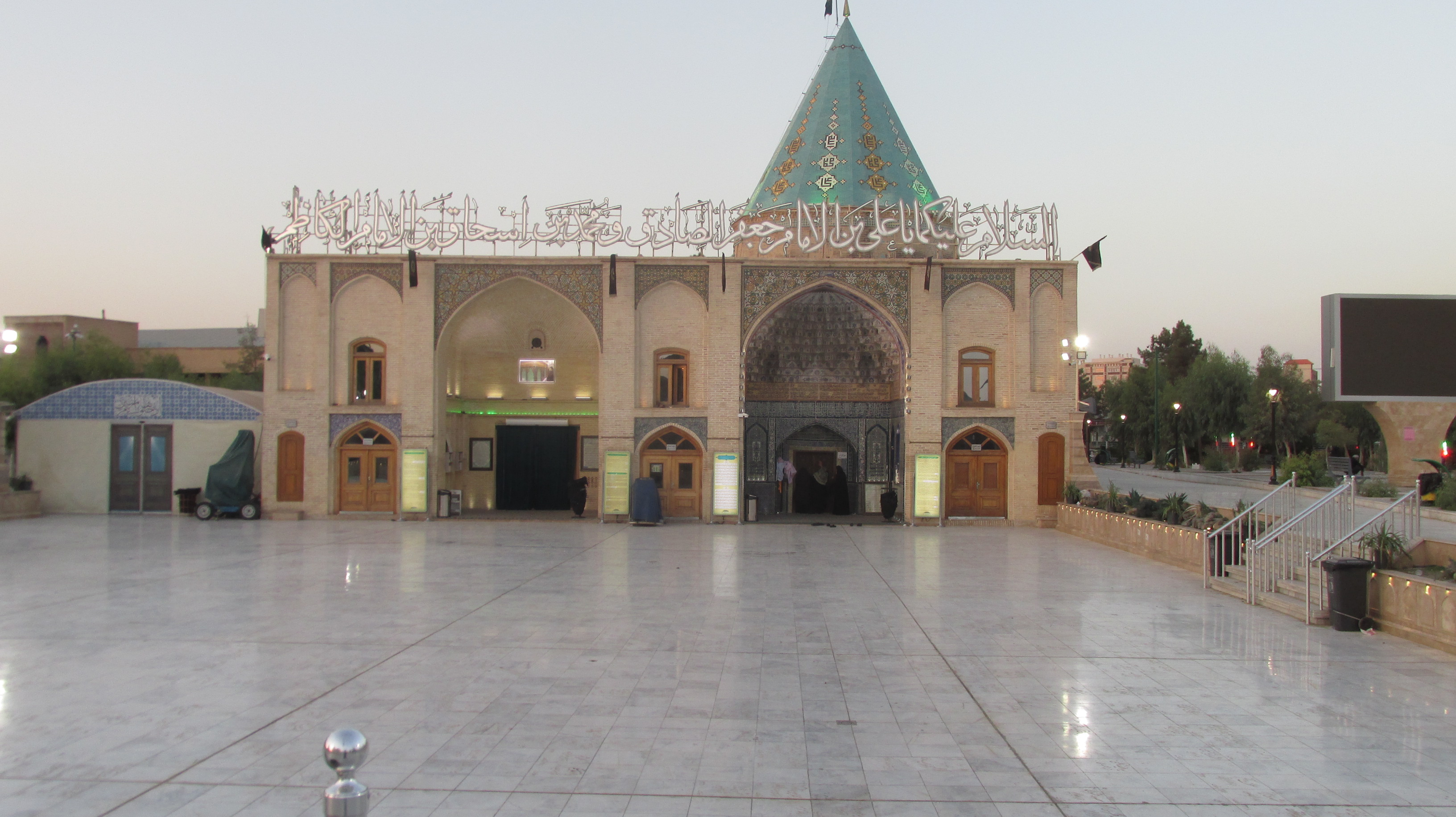

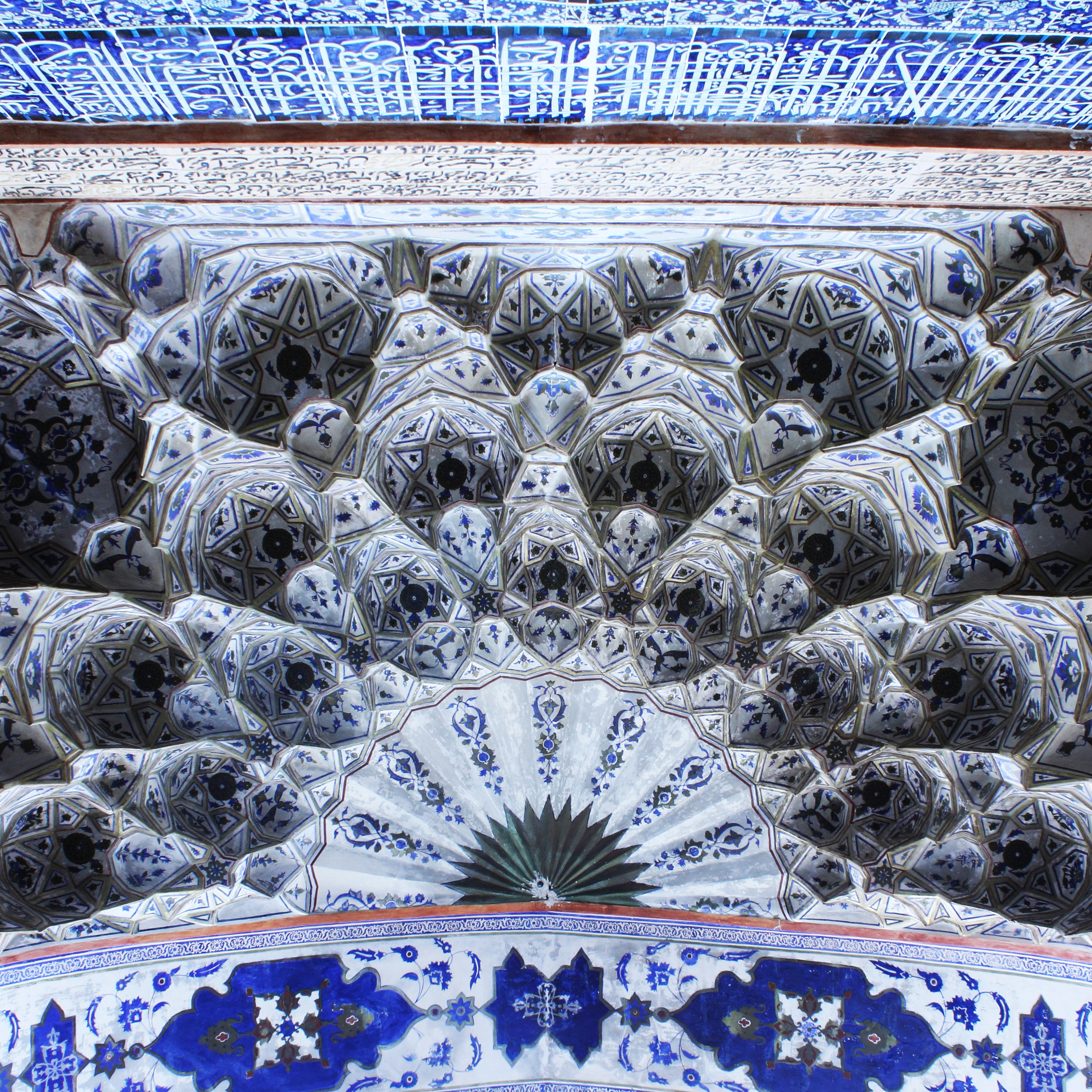

== See also ==
- List of imamzadehs in Iran
- List of cemeteries in Iran
- List of mausoleums in Iran
- Shia Islam in Iran
