= Golzar Shohada of Qom =

One of the Iran's cemetery in Qom

- گلزار شهدای قم گلزار شهدای علی ابن جعفر (ع)
- Interactive map of Golzar Shohada of Qom

Details
- Location: Qom, Qom Province
- Country: Iran
- Coordinates: 34.63124°N 50.8974°E
- Type: Public, Muslim, Veterans, Historic, National
- Style: Architectural, Artistic and Cultural style

Golzar Shahada of Qom or Golzar Shahada Ali Ibn Jafar is a cemetery in Qom, Iran. This cemetery is the burial place of famous and historical people, also burial place of the martyrs of the Iran-Iraq war. This cemetery is the largest cemetery in Qom province. This cemetery is known as the second national cemetery of Iran with 3,000 martyrs belonging to the Iran-Iraq war and more than a thousand international martyrs. In this cemetery, prominent and important people are buried, including the martyrs related to the events of the Iranian revolution and the victims related to the 2015 Mina incident. Also, apart from Qomi and Iranian martyrs, there are also Iraqi martyrs who refused to fight in the Iraqi front, so they fought alongside the Iranian fighters against the Ba'ath regime and are buried in this cemetery.

== See also ==
- Imamzadeh Ali ibn Jafar
- Mausoleum of Ruhollah Khomeini
- Behesht-e Zahra
- List of cemeteries in Iran
- Sheikhan cemetery
- Doulab Cemetery
- Ibn Babawayh Cemetery
- Imamzadeh Abdollah, Ray
- Golestan Shohada of Isfahan
