= Giliard =

Coordinates: 35°41′N 52°02′E

Giliard is a village near the city of Damavand, Iran. It is the site of an ancient Jewish cemetery. It is also called Jilard by the people living there.
