= Ata'ollah Ashrafi Esfahani =

Iranian Ayatollah (1902-1982)

Ayatollah Ata'ollah Ashrafi Esfahani

Personal life
- Born: 1902 Homayoun Shahr, Esfahan Iran
- Died: 15 October 1982 (aged 80) Bakhtaran, Kermanshah, Iran

Religious life
- Religion: Twelver Shia Islam

Ayatollah Ata'ollah Ashrafi Esfahani (Persian: آیت‌الله عطاءالله اشرفی اصفهانی; 1902 – 15 October 1982) was an Iranian religious leader. He was born near Esfahan and educated in Esfahan and at the Qom Seminary. He became a mojtahed when he was 40. After the Islamic Revolution of 1979, he was selected as the Imam Jumu'ah (the chief mullah for Friday prayers) for the city of Kermanshah. He was killed during Friday prayer on 15 October 1982.

== Early life ==
Esfahani was born in 1902 in Khomeyni Shahr (then called Sadeh), a city located some 10 kilometres (6.2 mi) west of the central city of Esfahan. His father, Mirza Asadollah, was a religious scholar; his mother, Lady Najmeh, was a daughter of Sayyed Mohammad Taghi MirDamadi. He is a descendant of one of the Jabal Amel (Arabic: جبل عامل) scholars who converted to Islam in the early days of Islam; his ancestors then moved to the area near Esfahan.

== Education ==
Esfahani lived in his birthplace, Sadeh (later called Khomeyni Shahr after the Islamic Revolution), until the age of 12. He then attended the Esfahan Hawza (Seminary) for around 10 years, learning from such scholars as Ayatollah Besharati and Hassan Modarres. In 1923, at age 20, he moved to the Qom Seminary to continue his education. At first, he went to the Razawieh Seminary (Persian: مدرسه رضویه) for one year, then the Feyzieh Seminary (Persian: مدرسه فیضیه) for about one more year before starting to study with Abdul Karim Haeri Yazdi. After Haeri Yazdi's death in 1937, he studied under Mohammad Taghi Khansari, Seyed Mohammad Hojjat Kuh-Kamari, and Seyed Sadreddin Sadr. At age forty, he was certified for ijtihad (Persian: اجتهاد) by Mohammad Taghi Khansari.

When Seyyed Hossein Borujerdi went to Qom, Esfahani studied with him for 15 years.

== Relationship with Khomeini ==
Khomeini said about Esfahani: "This our dear altar martyr that was martyred in last Friday, was the great person who I have devotion towards him. I know this Blessed person almost sixty years." The feelings were apparently mutual; Esfahani said that "No one can be compared with Imam Khomeini." After death of Boroujerdi in 1961, Esfahani tried to declare Khomeini the Grand Marja', replacing Boroujerdi.

== Religious and political activities ==
=== Going to Kermanshah ===
In 1956, Esfahani moved to Kermanshah at Ayatollah Borujerdi's command, to spread the teachings of Islam and reopen the seminary in Kermanshah. In 1963, Khomeini appointed him as his representative in Kermanshah. After the Islamic Revolution on 6 October 1979, Khomeini selected him as Imam Jumu'ah of Kermanshah.

=== Role in the Islamic Revolution in Iran ===
Esfahani was one of the followers of Khomeini during the Iranian Revolution. Commemoration of the demise of Mostafa Khomeini by Esfahani was the base of the revolutionary movement in Kermanshah. On 5 January 1978, with the publication of an insulting article in the Ettela'at newspaper against Khomeini, there were demonstrations in many Iranian cities, including Kermanshah. Esfahani was the leader of the demonstration in Kermanshah, as well as many others in that city.

=== Iran–Iraq war ===
During the Iran–Iraq War, he went to the war zones and spoke with Iranian soldiers. Also he stressed the importance of the war in sermons during Jumu'ah prayers.

=== Trying to unite Sunni and Shia ===
He tried to unite Sunni and Shia in Kermanshah. To attempt this, he visited Paveh, Javanrood, and Ravansar, the Sunni cities of Kermanshah, and held many meetings with Sunni scholars.

=== Books ===
- Al-Bayan
- Interpretation of Qur'an (A brief review of Shia and Sunni interpretations)
- Majma-Al-Shatat
- The books about Muqatta'at
- A book about Imam Mahdi.

== Death ==
On 15 October 1982, after two unsuccessful attempts to kill him, he was assassinated.

== See also ==
- List of Shia Muslim scholars of Islam
