= Mahmoud Ansari Qomi =

Iranian Ayatollah (1921-1999)

Mahmoud Ansari Qomi (Persian: محمود انصاری قمی) was an Iranian cleric.

== Early life ==
He was born around 1921 to a family in Qom. He lost his father at age ten and under the tutelage of his brothers, initial lessons were learned. Mahmoud Ansari was in young individuals to study in Najaf and the area was great training. He studied under Tehran scholars and Abu al-Qasim al-Khoei in Najaf.

== Professors ==
He trained under masters including:

- Syed Abdul Hadi Shirazi
- Muhsin al-Hakim
- Abu al-Qasim al-Khoei
- Mohammad-Reza Golpaygani
- Ahmad Khonsari
- Ruhollah Khomeini
- Agha Bozorg Tehrani
- Shahab al-Din Mar'ashi Najafi

== Islamic revolution ==
He was arrested before the Islamic Revolution in 1963. He played an important role in encouraging Najaf scholars. Around 1964 he moved to Tehran.

== Social service ==
He helped establish dozens of mosques and two hospitals.

== Death ==
He died on 12 March 1999 at age seventy-seven. He was buried in the Sheikhan cemetery in Qom.
