= Hassan Ghazi =

Iranian footballer (1959–1984)

Sardar Shahid Hassan Ghazi
- Born: 9 July 1959; Isfahan, Iran
- Died: 1 March 1984; Talaiye, Khuzestan Province, Iran
- Allegiance: IRGC
- Battles / wars: Iran–Iraq War †

Major General Hassan Ghazi (Persian: حسن غازی) (9 July 1959 – 1 March 1984) was an Iranian footballer who was captain of Sepahan and was the main architect of the Iranian missile system in the Islamic Revolutionary Guard Corps during Iran–Iraq War.

== Biography ==
Ghazi was born on 9 July 1959 in Isfahan. After graduating from high school, Ghazi went to Isfahan University of Medical Sciences.

=== Club career ===
He was captain of the Sepahan under-23 team. In 1974, he was considered one of the best Iranian players despite his age. Due to his talent, young age, and impressive performances, he was transferred to Iran under-23 team.

=== As developer of Iran's missile program ===
Ghazi took part in the 1979 Iranian Islamic Revolution. He had important roles in the Iran-Iraq war in the establishment of the first artillery and of the missile command center in AGIR.

== Death ==
On 1 March 1984, Ghazi was killed during Operation Kheibar at the age of 24.

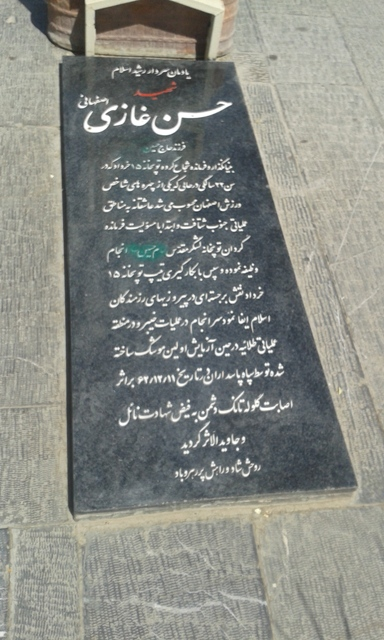
Ghazi gravestone in Takht-e Foulad

== Legacy ==
Ghazi Stadium, Ghazi Military base and Ghazi Bridge in Isfahan are named after him.

== In popular culture ==
Shaghayeghe Ashegh(fa: شقایق عاشق) (27 January 2014), ed. Zeynan Ataee, Isfahan: Setaregane Derakhshan; consisted of brief biographies of Hassan Ghazi and a collection of memories of officers and other people about them.

== See also ==
- List of Iranian commanders in the Iran–Iraq War
