= Sheikhan cemetery =

Cemetery in Qom, Iran

- گورستان شیخان
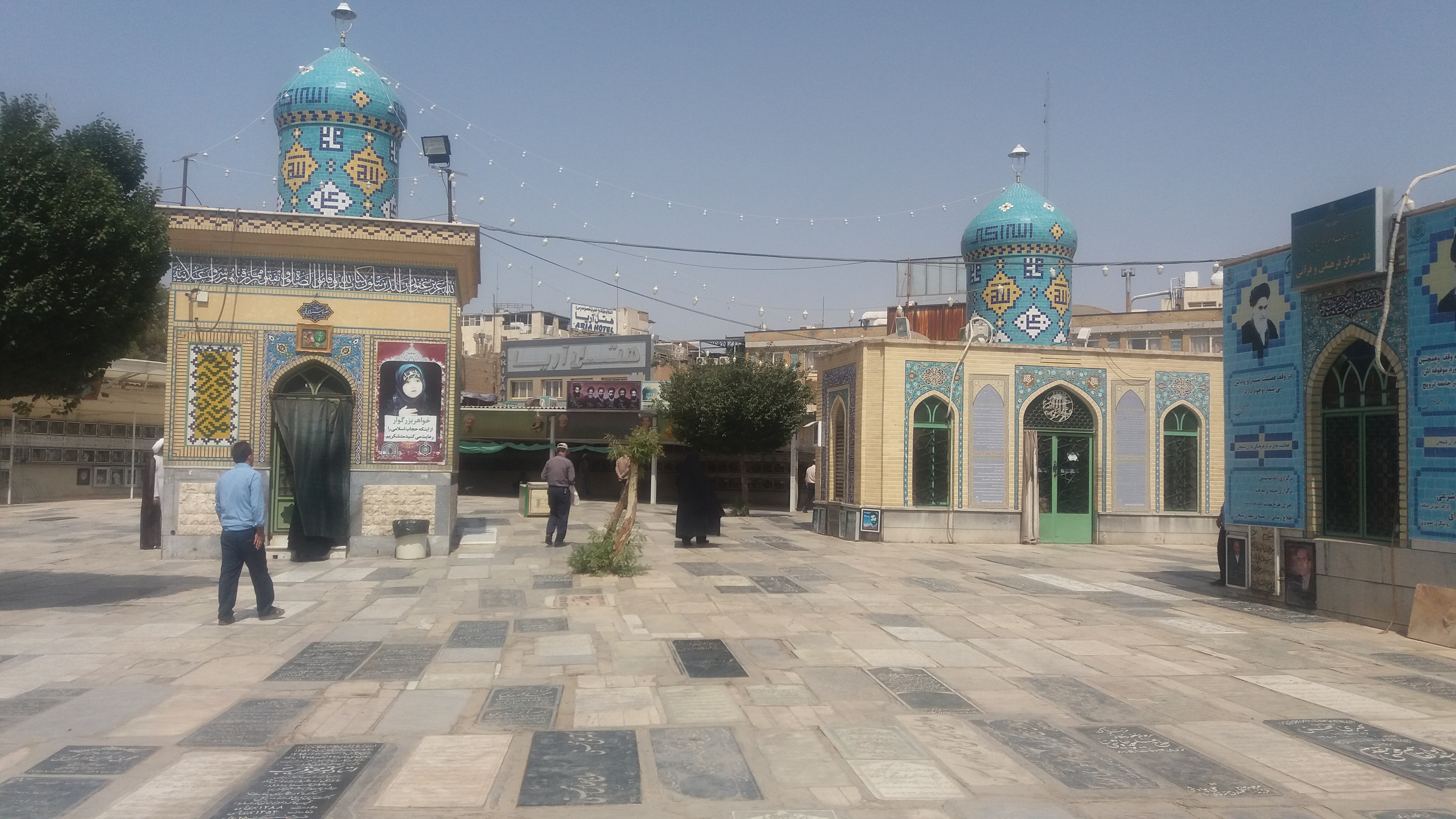
- Interactive map of Sheikhan cemetery

Details
- Established: Over a thousand years ago
- Location: Qom, Qom Province
- Country: Iran
- Coordinates: 34°38′33.5″N 50°52′53.7″E
- Type: Public, Muslim, Veterans, Historic, National
- Style: Architectural, Artistic and Cultural style

Sheikhan cemetery (Persian: گورستان شیخان, lit. 'Scholars' Cemetery') is the second historical cemetery in the Islamic world and one of the oldest cemeteries in Qom, Qom Province, Iran which is located near the Fatima Masumeh Shrine. The cemetery dates back over a thousand years.

This cemetery is currently the burial place of some Shiite scholars such as Zakaria ibn Idris Ash'ari Qomi, Zakaria ibn Adam Ash'ari Qomi, Mirza-ye Qomi, Mohammad Ali Modarres Khiabani and Mahmoud Ansari Qomi, as well as those killed during the Iranian Revolution (1979) and Iranian soldiers killed during the Iran-Iraq war.

The eight victims of the Haft-e Tir bombing, along with their families, as well as Dr. Mohammad Gharib (father of Pediatrics in Iran) are buried in this cemetery. Also, Mirza Jawad Maleki Tabrizi, the famous Faqīh and Mysticism as well as Fakhr al-Sadat Borghei, one of the victims of the Chain murders of Iran, are buried in this cemetery.

== Gallery ==
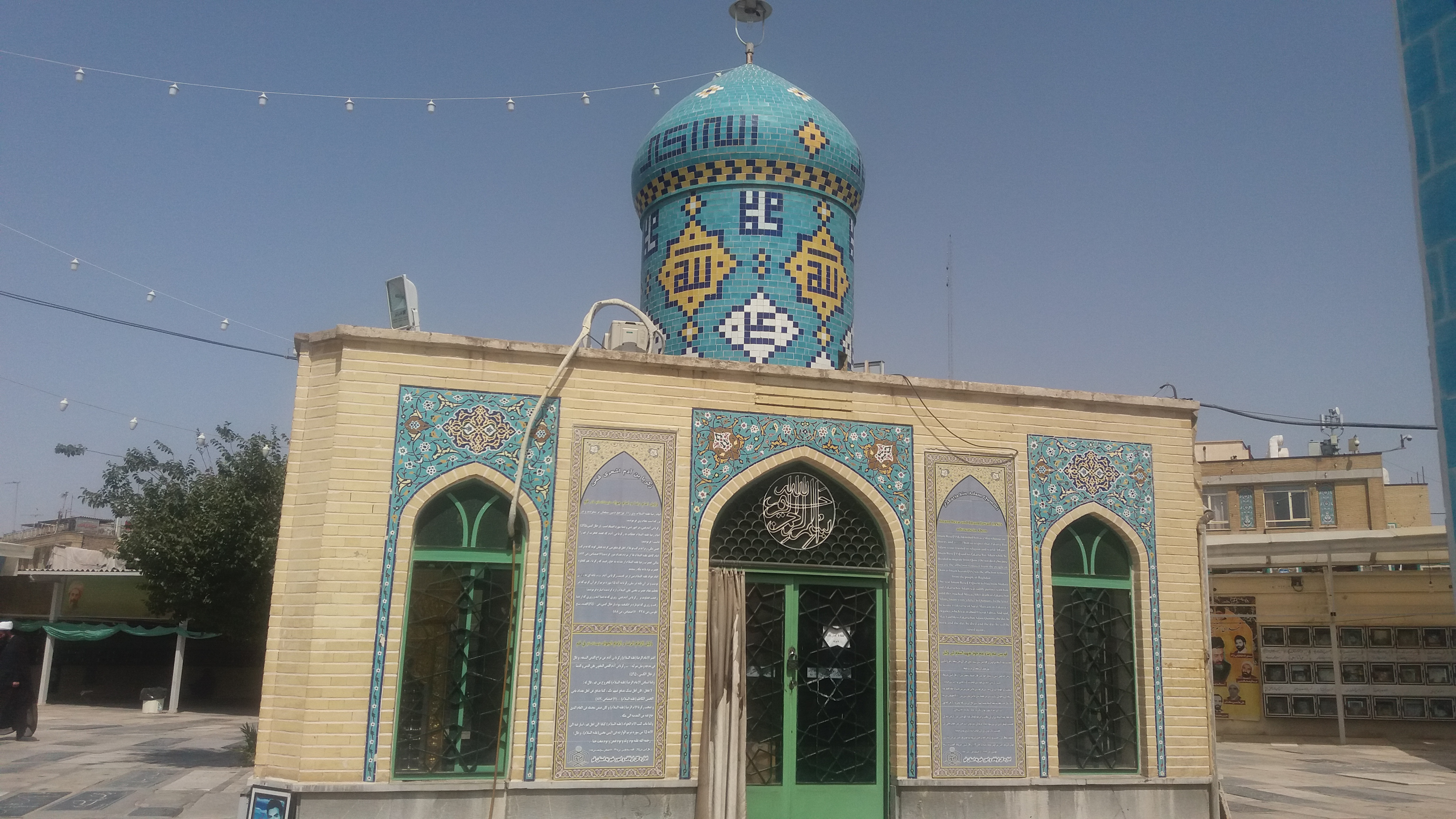
Tomb of "Zakaria Ibn Adam Ash'ari" – 2016

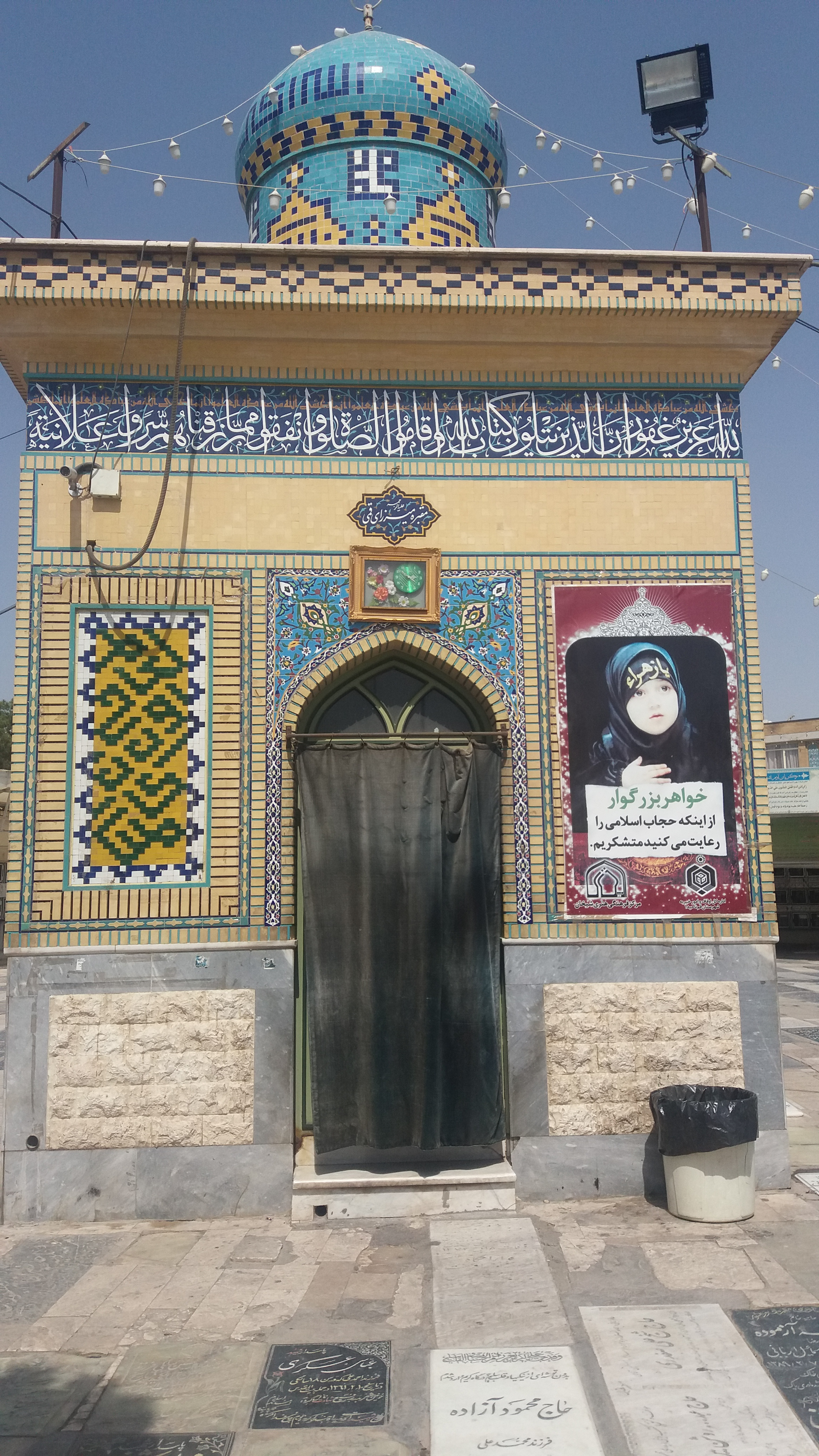
Tomb of "Mirza Qomi" – 2016

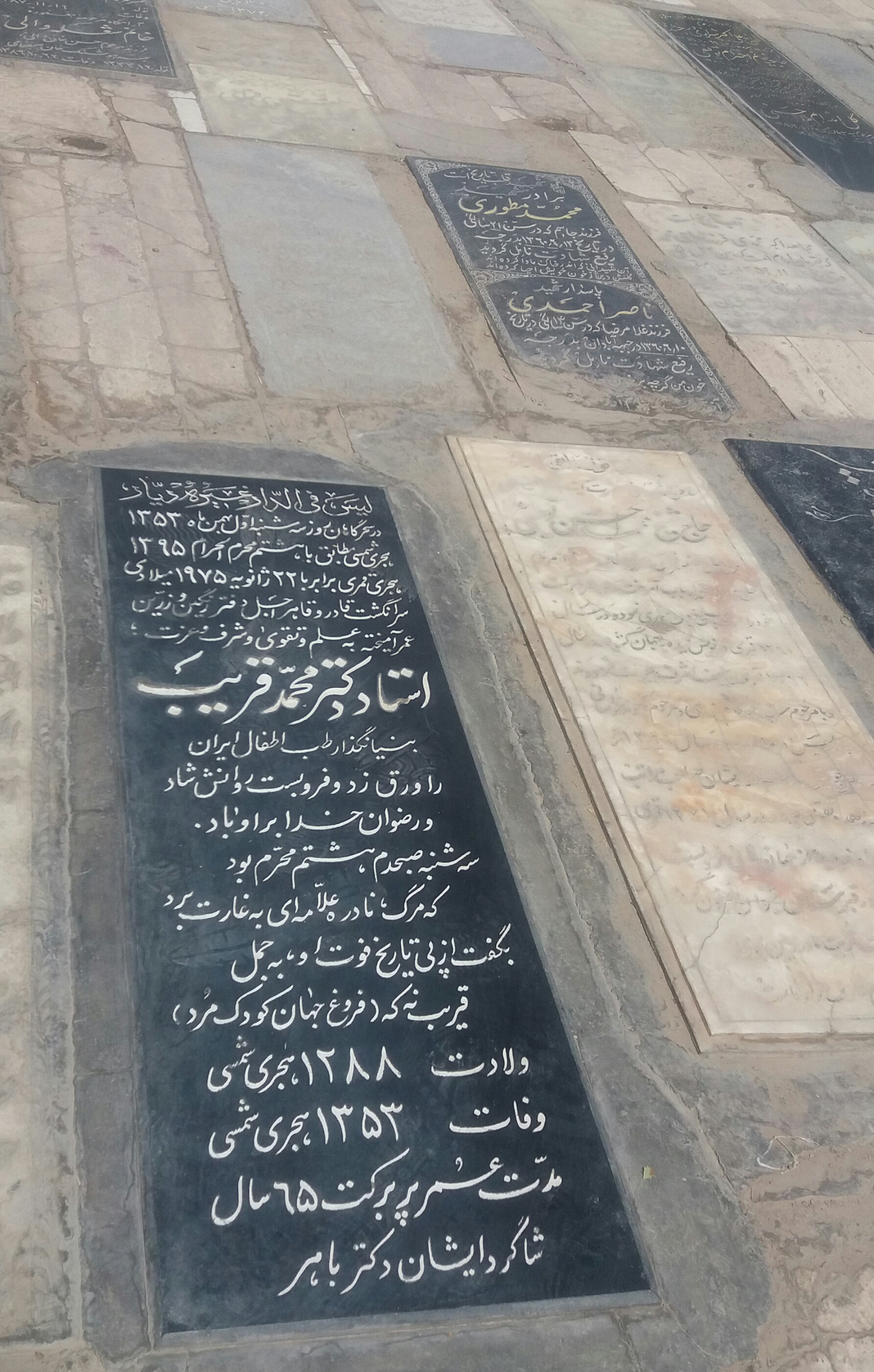
Tomb of "Dr. Mohammad Gharib" – 2016

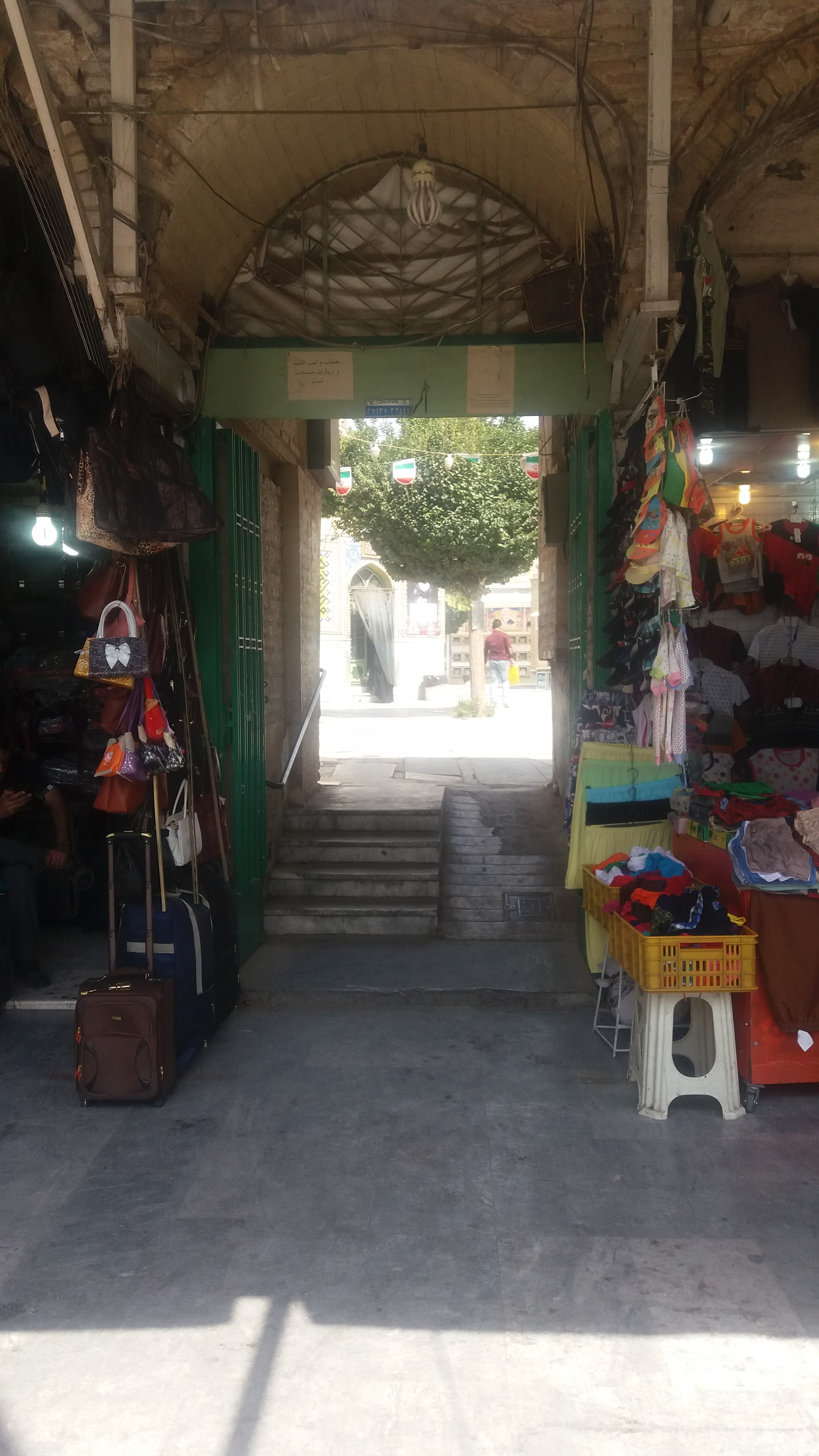
Sheikhan cemetery entrance – 2016

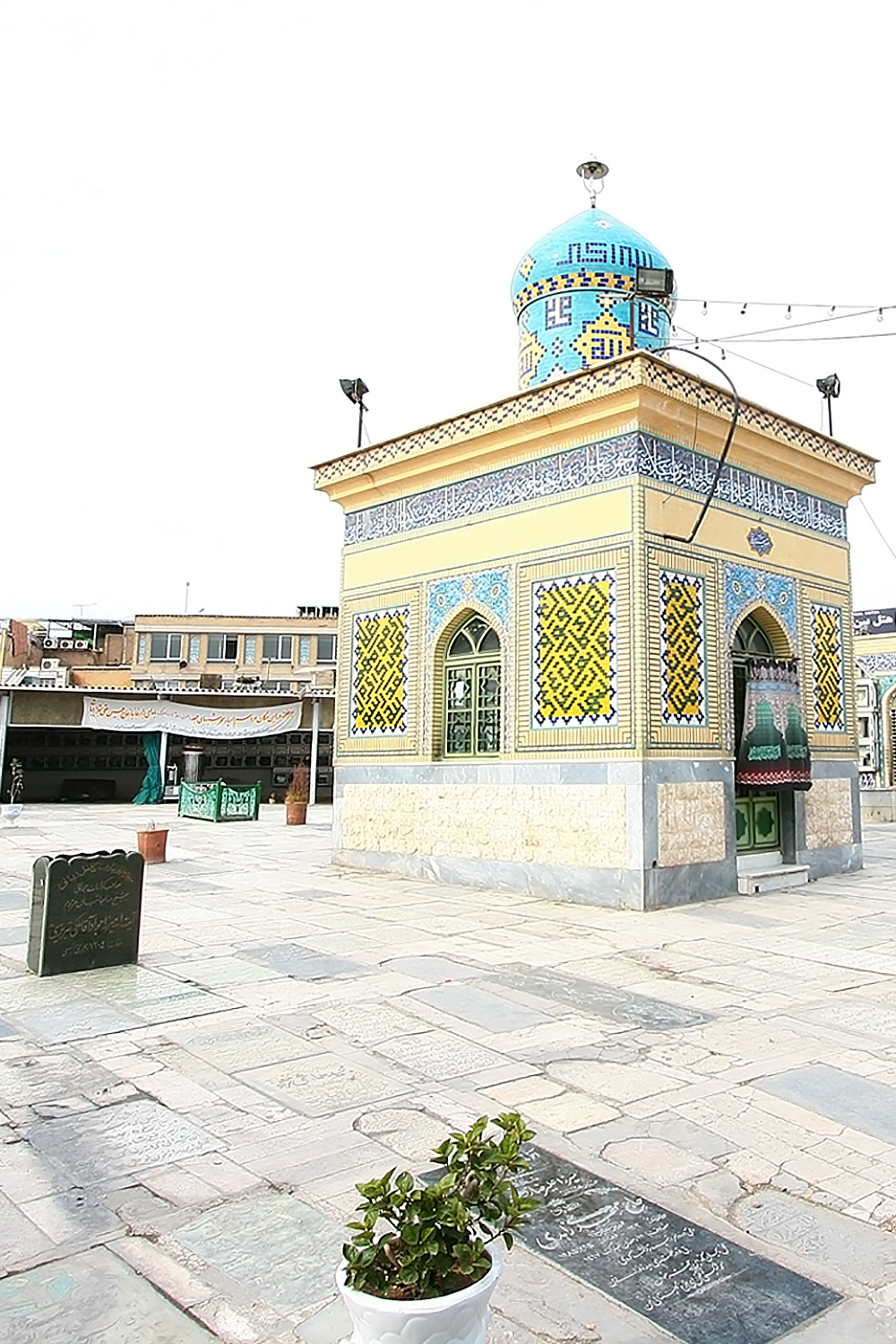
Another view – 2016

== See also ==
- Behesht-e Zahra
- Doulab Cemetery
- Ibn Babawayh Cemetery
- Imamzadeh Abdollah, Ray
- Golestan Shohada of Isfahan
- Golzar Shohada of Qom
