= Shahrokndin =

Shahrokndin may refer to:

- Monument of Shahrokndin
- Bath of Shah Rokn al-Din, also known as Bath of Shahrokndin
