= Agha Mirza Mohammad Baqer Chahar Suqi Mosque =

Mosque in Isfahan, Iran

- مسجد آقا میرزا محمد باقر چهارسوقی
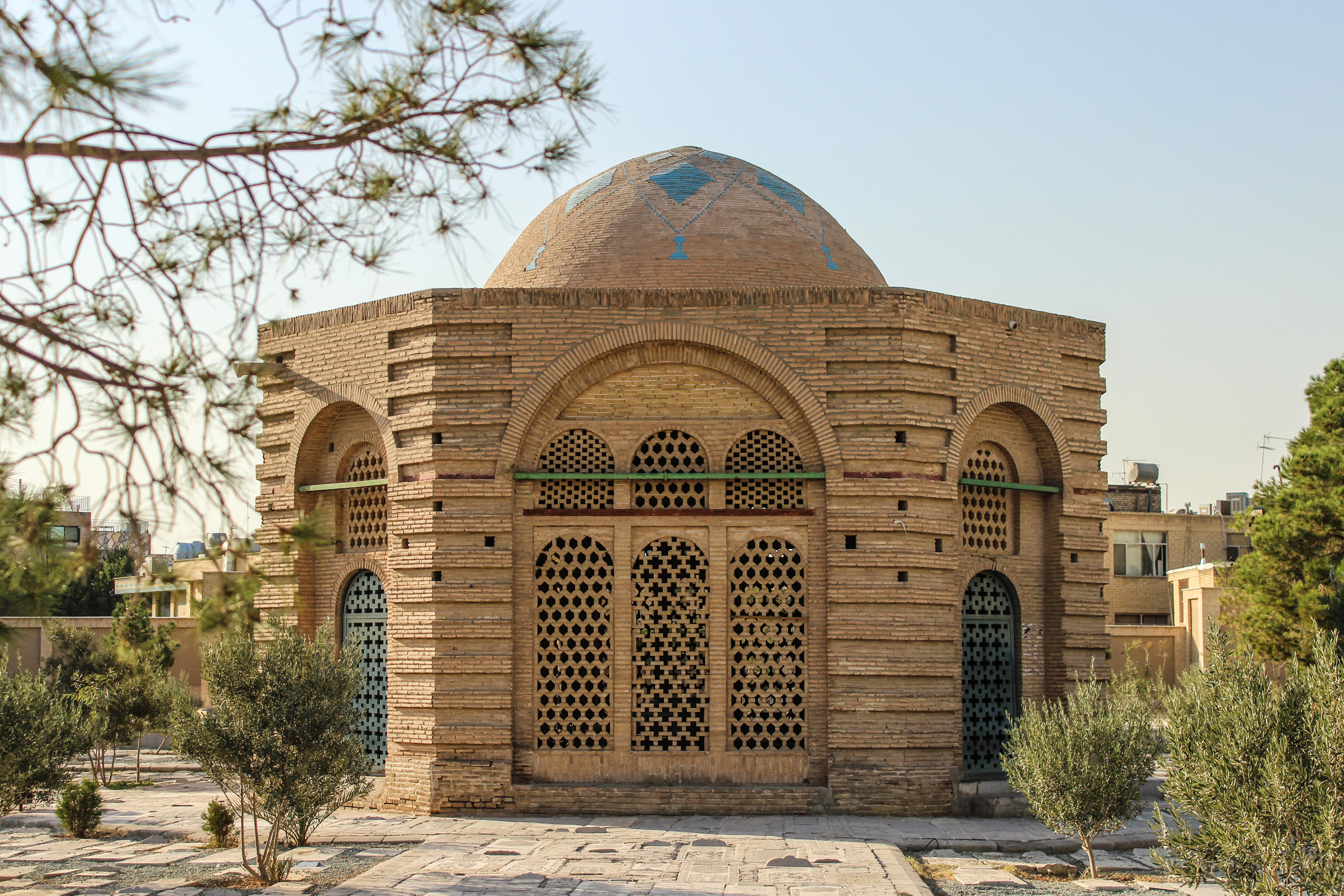
- The mosque in 2018

- Location of the mosque in Iran

Religion
- Affiliation: Shia Islam
- Ecclesiastical or organizational status: Mosque
- Status: Active

Location
- Location: Takht-e Foulad, Esfahan, Isfahan province
- Country: Iran
- Interactive map of Agha Mirza Mohammad Baqer Chahar Suqi Mosque
- Coordinates: 32°37′39″N 51°40′58″E

Architecture
- Type: Mosque architecture
- Style: Qajar

Specifications
- Dome: One
- Materials: Bricks

Iran National Heritage List
- Official name: Agha Mirza Mohammad Baqer Chahar Suqi Mosque
- Type: Built
- Designated: 2 August 2005
- Reference no.: 12301
- Conservation organization: Cultural Heritage, Handicrafts and Tourism Organization of Iran

The Agha Mirza Mohammad Baqer Chahar Suqi Mosque (Persian: مسجد آقا میرزا محمد باقر چهارسوقی) is a Shi'ite mosque, located in Takht-e Foulad, a cemetery in the city of Isfahan, Isfahan province, Iran. The mosque was completed during the Qajar era.

The mosque was added to the Iran National Heritage List on 2 August 2005, administered by the Cultural Heritage, Handicrafts and Tourism Organization of Iran.

== See also ==
- Shia Islam in Iran
- List of mosques in Iran
