= Mausoleum of Shah Rokneddin =

Imamzadeh in Dezful, Iranian national heritage site

- بقعه شاه رکن الدین
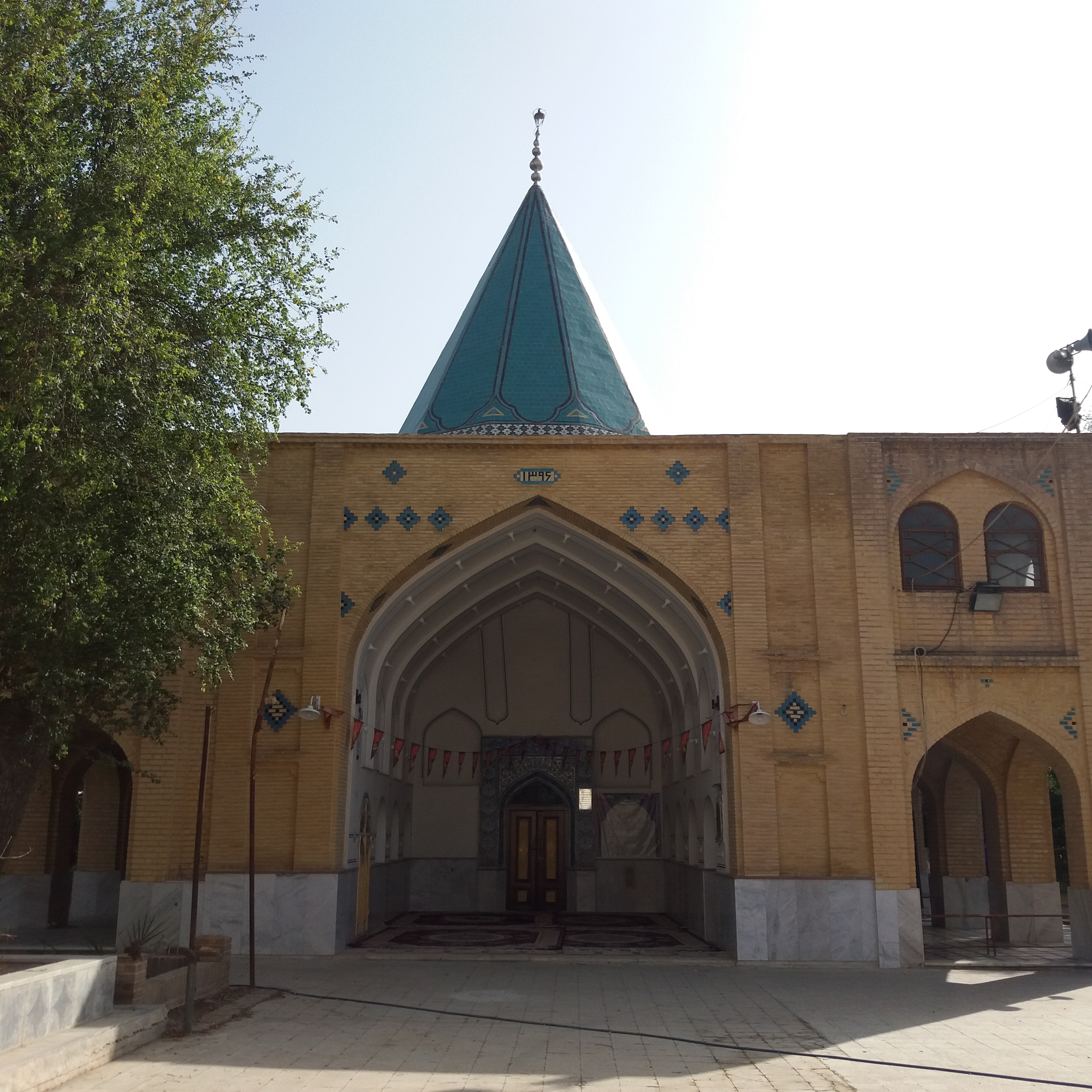
- Entrance to the mausoleum, 2019

- Location of mausoleum in Iran

Religion
- Affiliation: Islam
- Ecclesiastical or organizational status: Mausoleum
- Status: Active

Location
- Location: Shah Rokn-ed-din, Dezful, Khuzestan province
- Country: Iran
- Interactive map of Mausoleum of Shah Rokneddin
- Coordinates: 32°22′44″N 48°23′52″E

Architecture
- Type: Islamic architecture
- Style: Timurid
- Completed: 15th century CE; 18th century (minarets added); 1971 (renovations); 1991 (renovations)

Specifications
- Dome: One
- Minaret: Two
- Monument: One: Ali al-Mashhour
- Materials: Brick

Iran National Heritage List
- Official name: Mausoleum of Shah Rokneddin
- Type: Built
- Designated: 23 May 1977
- Reference no.: 1377
- Conservation organization: Cultural Heritage, Handicrafts and Tourism Organization of Iran

The Mausoleum of Shah Rokneddin (Persian: بقعه شاه رکن الدین; Arabic: قبر شاه ركن الدين) (Note: Also known as the Shah Rukn-al Din Mausoleum, the Monument of Shahrokndin, and the Tomb of Shah Rokn al-Din.) is a mausoleum located in the Shah Rokn-ed-din district of Dezful, in the province of Khuzestan, Iran. It was built in the 15th century CE, during the Timurid era, and is the resting place of, Ali al-Mashhour, a son of Baba Rokneddin Wali.

The mausoleum was added to the Iran National Heritage List on 23 May 1977 and is administered by the Cultural Heritage, Handicrafts and Tourism Organization of Iran.

== History ==
The mausoleum and its turquoise conical dome were built in the 15th century during the rule of Timurid ruler, Shah Rukh. During the Qajar era, two minarets were added to the structure. During the 18th century and up until 1885 CE, the structure was used as a Sufi lodge. During the 20th century the iwans were added.

Every Muharram, a large festival is held at the mausoleum.

== Architecture ==
The tomb of Shah Rokneddin is the central part of the complex. It is topped by a blue conical dome with fourteen sides. It is attached to a small mosque, which is usually closed. Attached to the mausoleum is the Shah Rokn al-Din Bathhouse bathhouse. Also completed during the Timurid era, the bathhouse is separately listed on the Iran National Heritage List.

== Gallery ==
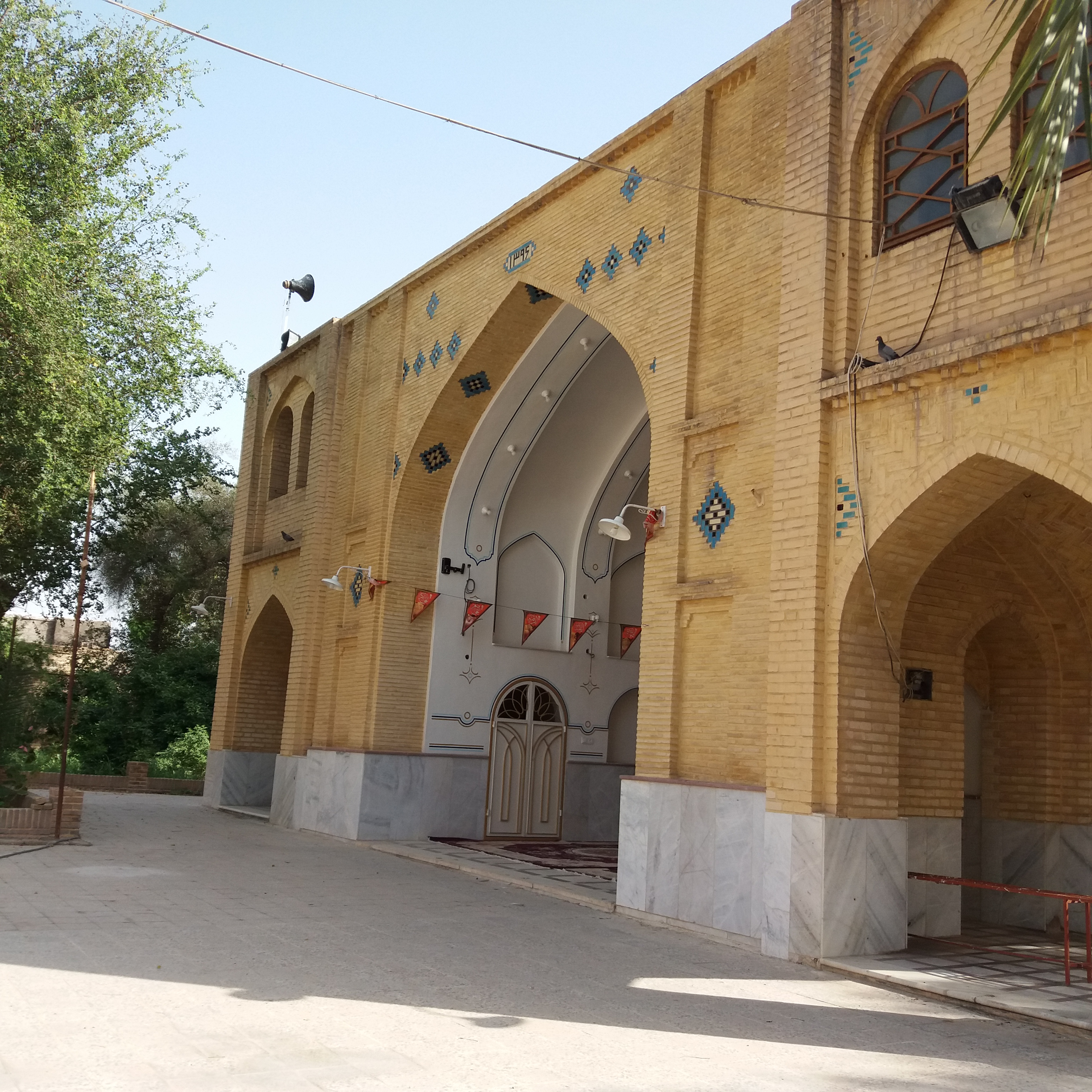

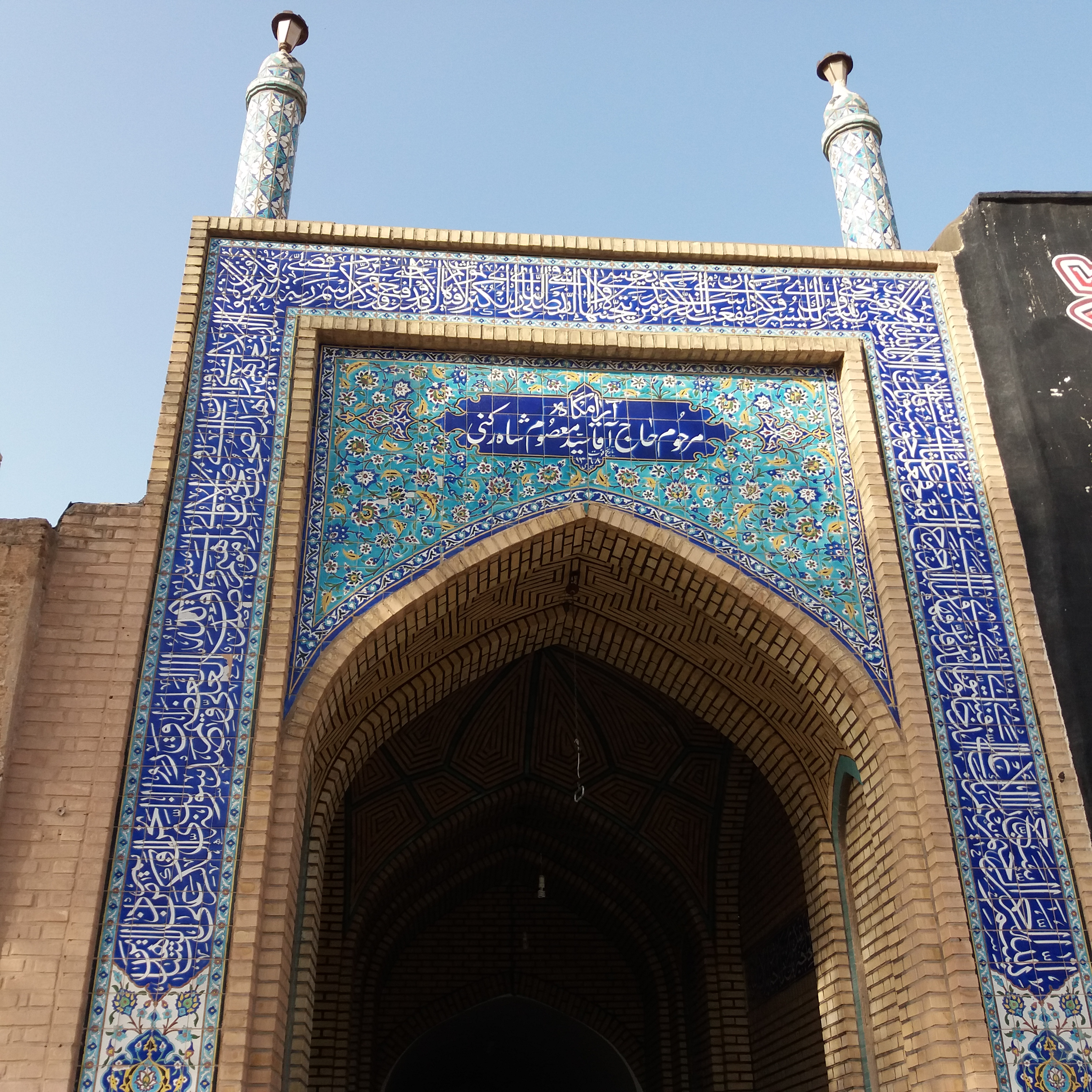

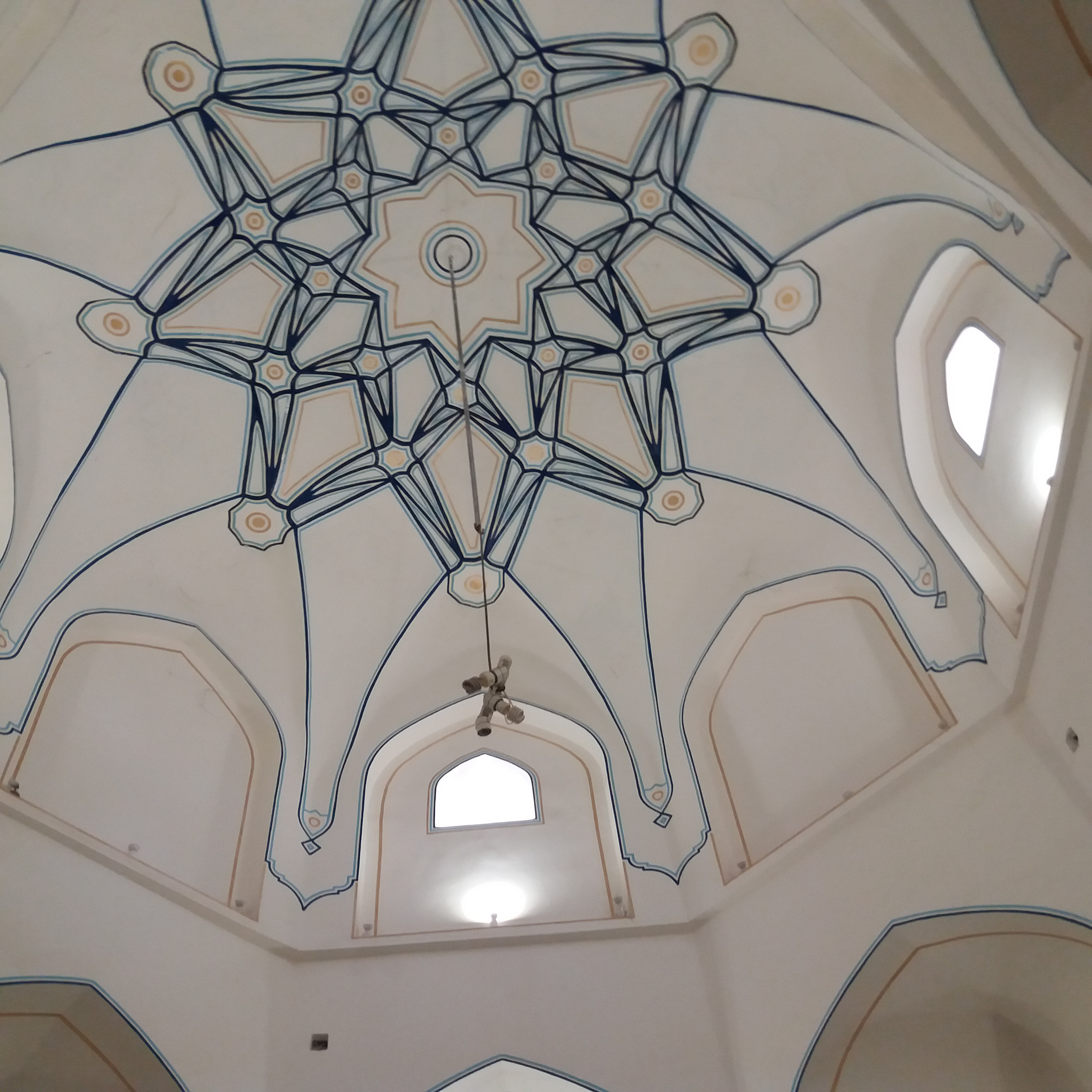

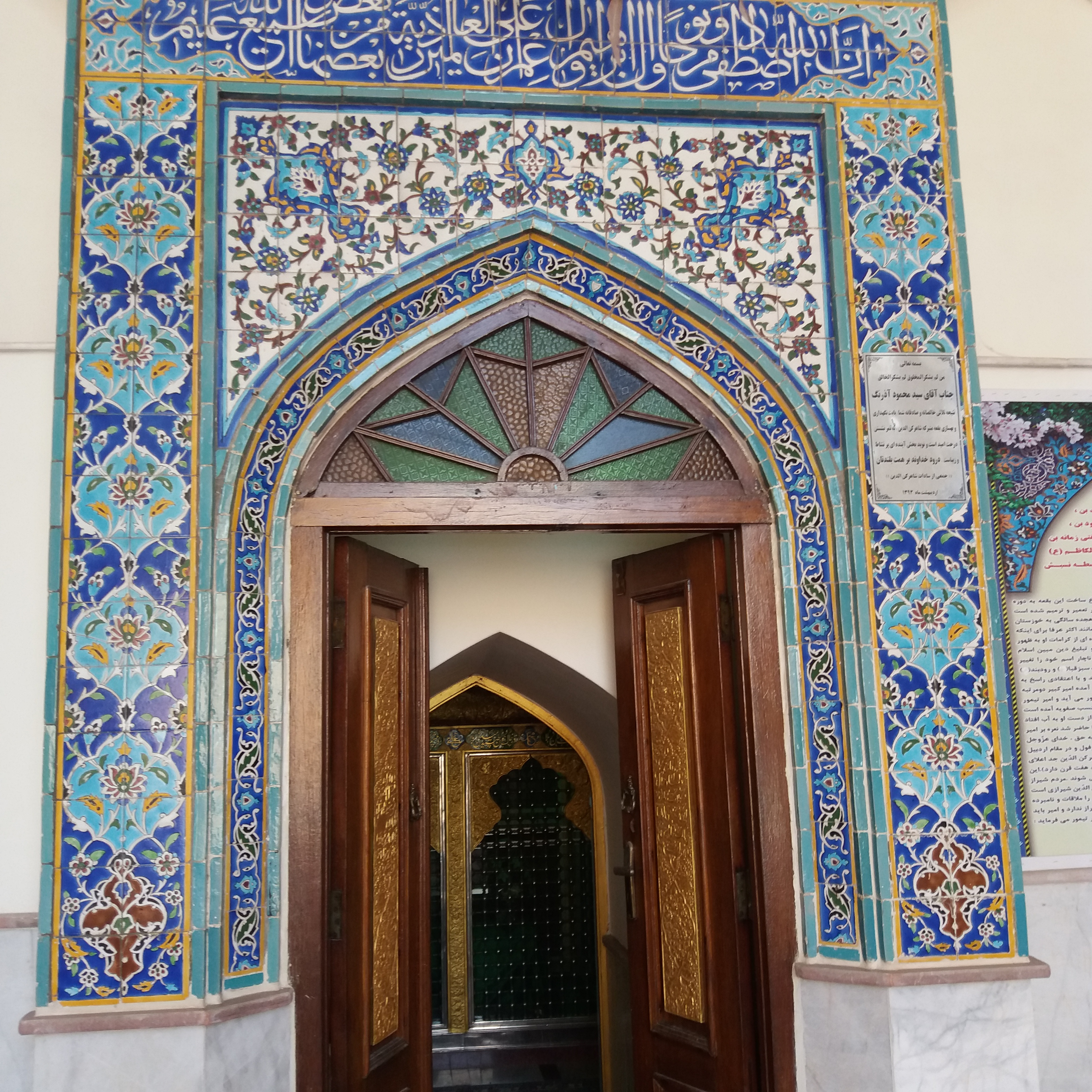

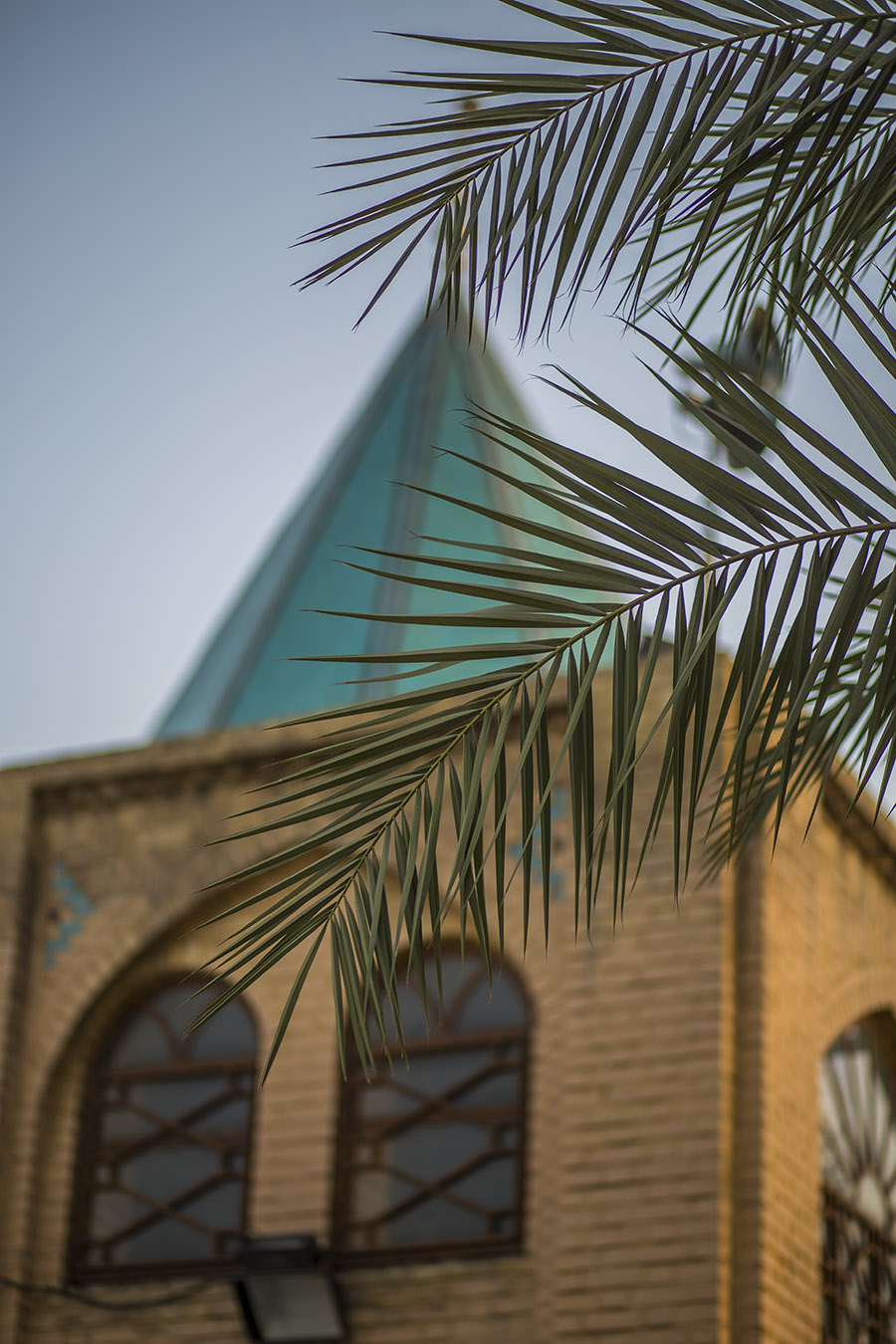

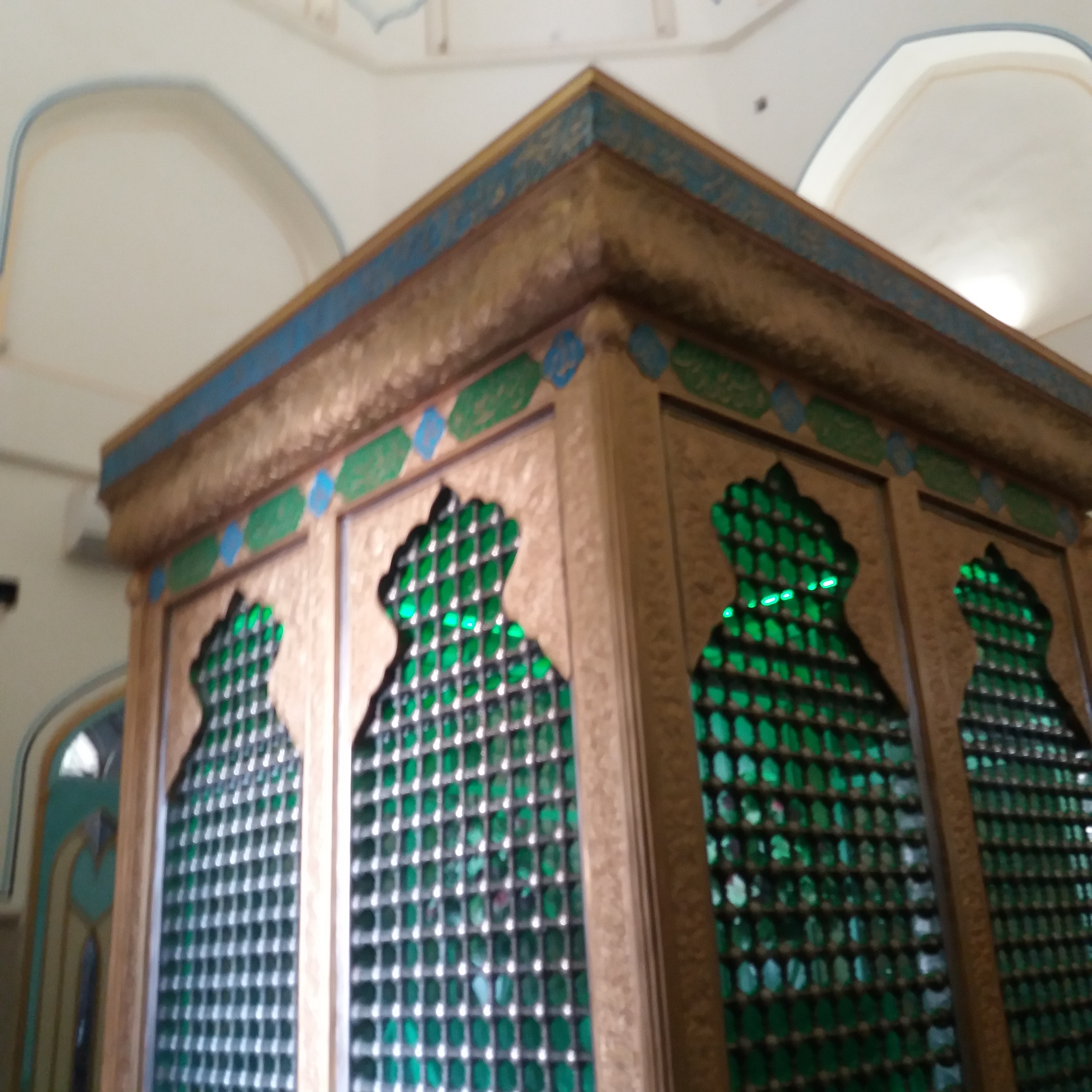
Shah Rokneddin's grave in the mausoleum

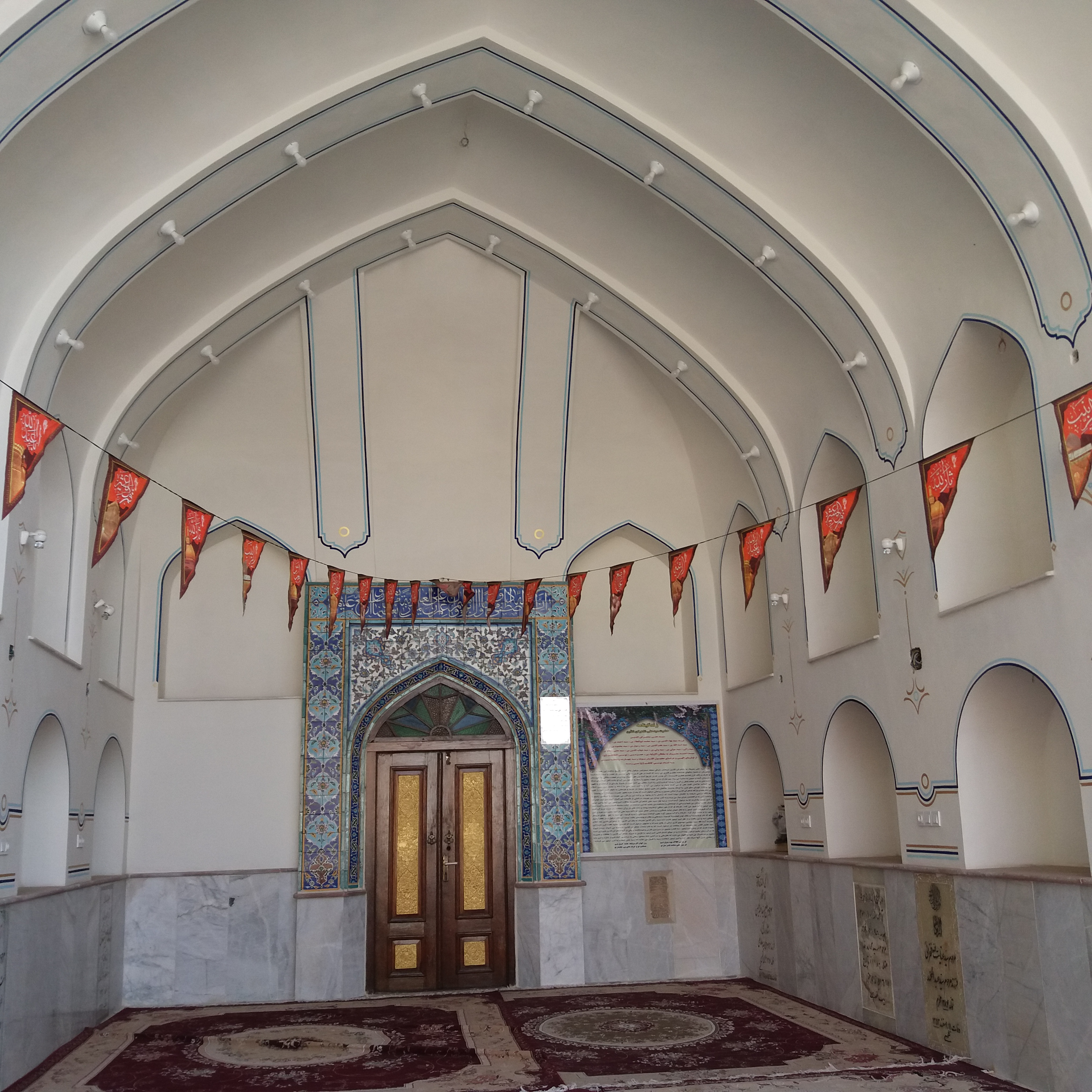
The prayer hall of Shah Rokneddin Mosque

== See also ==
- Islam in Iran
- List of mausoleums in Iran
