= 1839 in Iran =

- Decades
- See also: Other events of 1839; Years in Iran

The following lists events that happened during 1839 in Qajar era.

== Incumbents ==
- Monarch: Mohammad Shah Qajar

== Events ==
- Allahdad Massacre.

== Births ==
- ? – Muhammad Kazim Khurasani, Iranian Shi'a jurist and political activist.
- ? – Roknolmolk, Iranian author and politician.
- ? – Zeyn al-Abedin Maraghei, Persian novelist.
