= Roknolmolk Mosque =

Twelver Shi'ite mosque in Isfahan, Iran

- مسجد رکن الملک
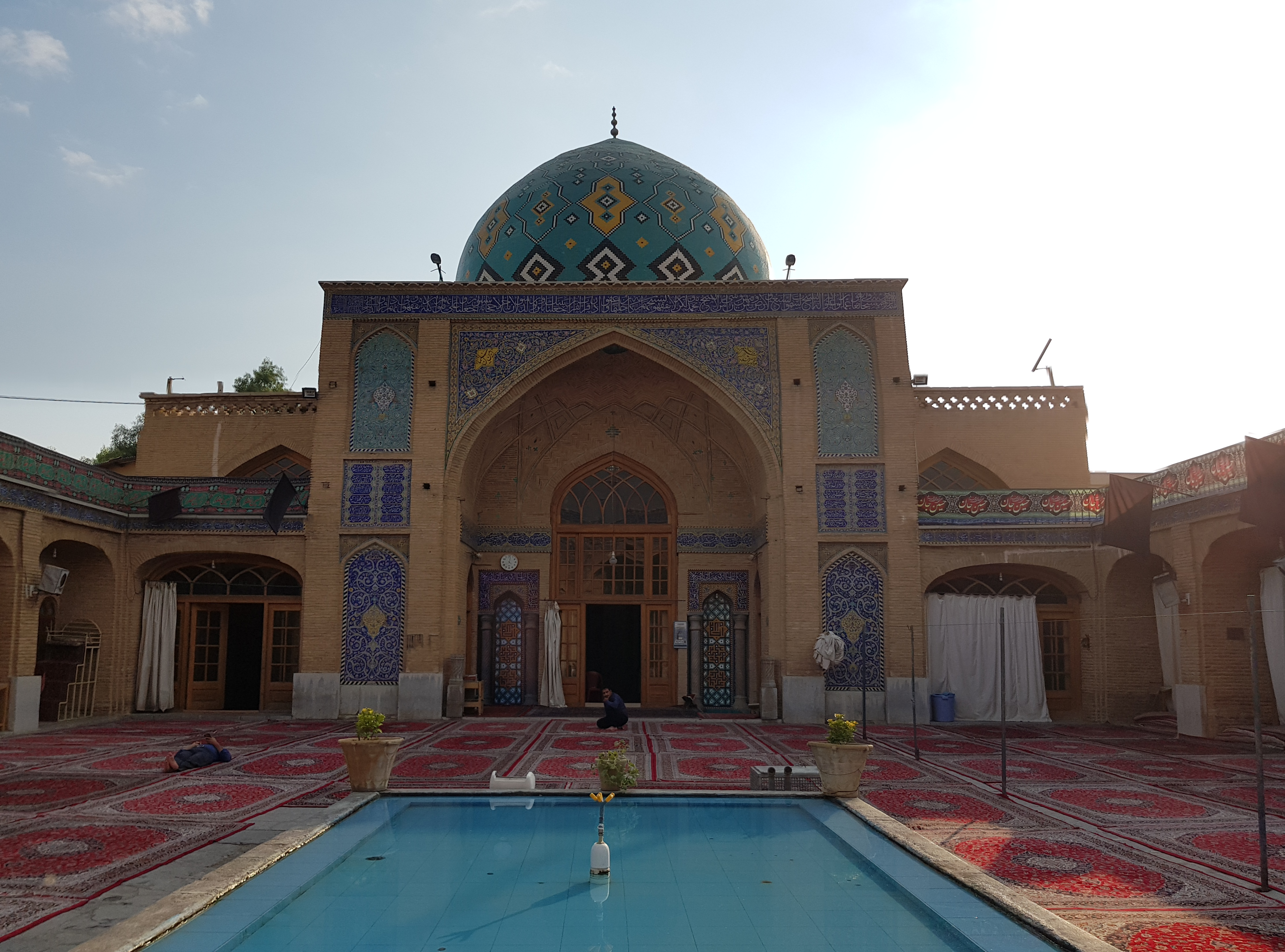
- The mosque in 2020

- Location of the mosque in Iran

Religion
- Affiliation: Shia (Twelver)
- Ecclesiastical or organisational status: Mosque
- Status: Active

Location
- Location: Takht-e Foulad, Esfahan, Isfahan province
- Country: Iran
- Coordinates: 32°37′42″N 51°41′08″E

Architecture
- Type: Mosque architecture
- Style: Isfahani
- Founder: Roknolmolk
- Groundbreaking: 1901
- Completed: 1907 (first structure); 1958 (renovations)

Specifications
- Dome: One
- Materials: Brick; mortar; tiles

Iran National Heritage List
- Official name: Roknolmolk Mosque
- Type: Built
- Designated: 15 May 1978
- Reference no.: 1604
- Conservation organization: Cultural Heritage, Handicrafts and Tourism Organization of Iran

The Roknolmolk Mosque (Persian: مسجد رکن الملک; Arabic: مسجد ركن الملك), formerly known as the Aksa Mosque, is a Twelver Shi'ite mosque, located in Esfahan, in the province of Isfahan, Iran. Completed in the early part of the 20th century, the mosque was built during the Qajar era and is situated adjacent to the Takht-e Foulad cemetery. It was founded in 1901 and built by and named after Mirza Soleyman Khan Shirazi, who was known as Roknolmolk.

The mosque was added to the Iran National Heritage List on 15 May 1978, administered by the Cultural Heritage, Handicrafts and Tourism Organization of Iran.

== History ==
The mosque was founded in 1901 by Roknolmolk and completed in 1907. In 1914, seven years later, Roknolmolk was buried in an empty room of the mosque. An inscription on the mosque dates the completion of a final renovation to 1958.

== Architecture ==
Made out of bricks, the mosque has two doors and an entrance gate decorated with flower designs. The arch of the main door is approximately 9 metres (30 ft) wide. There are steps for the muezzin to climb onto the roof of the prayer hall, as the mosque has no minarets.

Behind the entrance of the mosque, there is a secluded space that leads to a room that is the mausoleum for the Shi'ite clerics who belonged to the Kalbasi family. On the south side of the courtyard, there is a door that is the entrance to a water fountain. After passing through the main hall, a corridor connects the small court to the bigger court of the mosque. In the same hallway, there is a doorway on the left, which leads to a small room where the tombs of Roknolmolk himself and his wife are located. A wooden zarih encloses the two graves together.

On the west of the mosque courtyard is a musalla which is for the winter season.

== See also ==
- Shia Islam in Iran
- List of mosques in Iran
