= Mausoleum of Baba Rokneddin =

Mausoleum in Isfahan, Iran

Mausoleum of Baba Rukn al-Din
- مقبره بابا رکن الدین
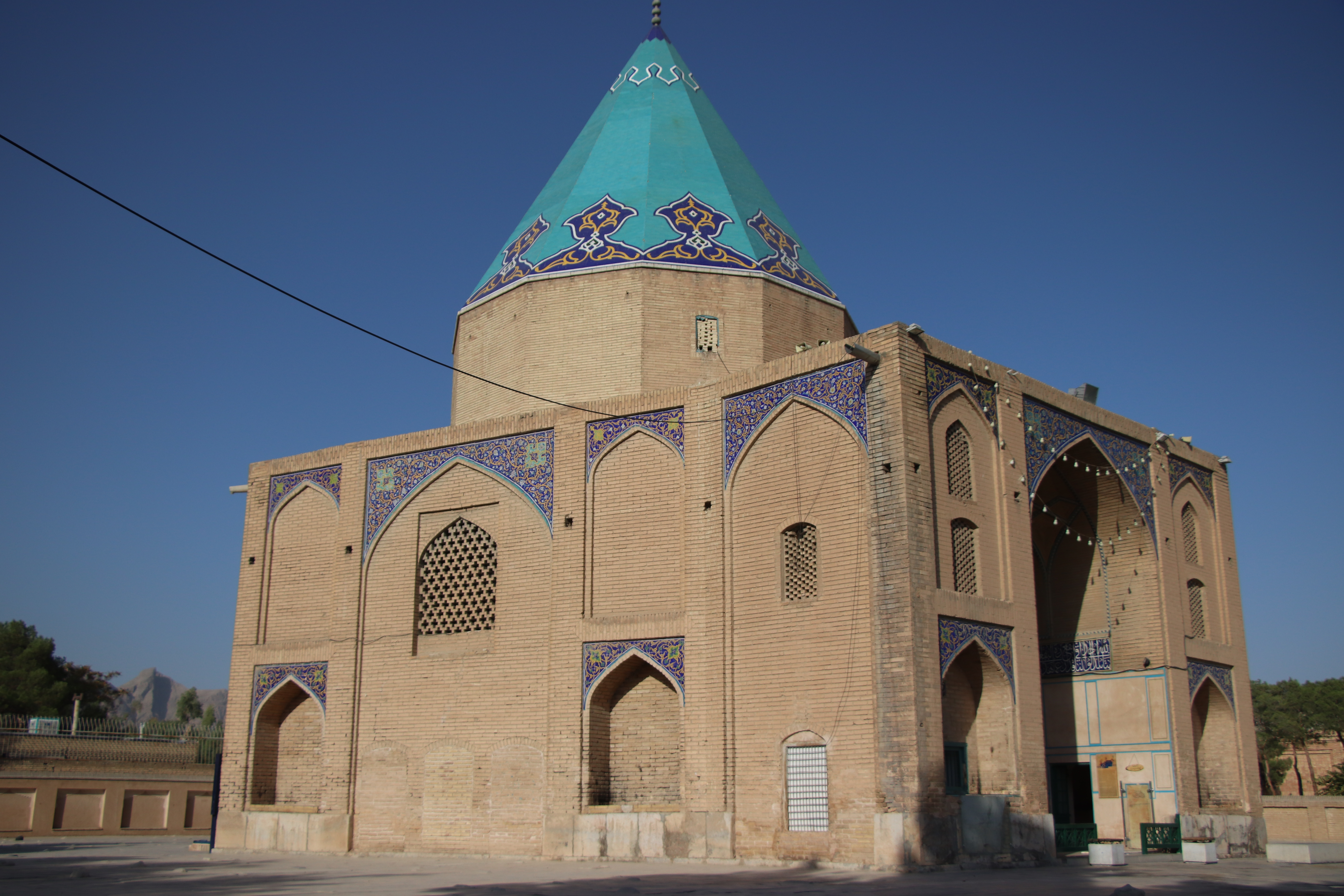
- The complex in 2018

- Location of the complex in Iran

Religion
- Affiliation: Islam
- Ecclesiastical or organisational status: Mausoleum
- Status: Active

Location
- Location: Takht-e Foulad, Esfahan, Isfahan province
- Country: Iran
- Interactive map of Mausoleum of Baba Rukn al-Din
- Coordinates: 32°37′28″N 51°40′52″E

Architecture
- Type: Islamic architecture
- Style: Ilkhanid; Safavid
- Completed: 14th century CE; 1630 CE (renovations)

Specifications
- Dome: One: (conical)
- Shrine: One: Tomb of Masoud ibn Abdullah al-Beyzawi
- Materials: Bricks; tiles; plaster; marble

Iran National Heritage List
- Official name: Mausoleum of Baba Rokneddin
- Type: Mausoleum
- Designated: 1933
- Reference no.: 201
- Conservation organization: Cultural Heritage, Handicrafts and Tourism Organization of Iran

The Mausoleum of Baba Rukn al-Din (Persian: مقبره بابا رکن الدین; Arabic: ضريح بابا ركن الدين), or simply known as the Mausoleum of Baba Rokneddin, is a mausoleum located within the grounds of the Takht-e Foulad cemetery in the city of Esfahan, in the province of Isfahan, Iran. The mausoleum entombs the remains of the Sufi mystic Masoud ibn Abdullah al-Beyzawi, who is known by his title Baba Rukn al-Din.

The complex was added to the Iran National Heritage List on 31 July 1933, administered by the Cultural Heritage, Handicrafts and Tourism Organization of Iran.

== History ==
The original construction of the mausoleum dates from the Ilkhanate era. During the reign of Shah Abbas I, restorations and renovations were done to the mausoleum. These works added a tiled porch and several new facilities to the mausoleum. Baba Rukn al-Din's tomb was the only surviving structure from the Ilkhanid era, and this remains true in the present time.

== Architecture ==
The mausoleum is made with bricks, while the exterior of the building is covered in decorative tiles. The dome is conical in shape, but has five sides. Inside the mausoleum, there are alcoves on each side of the structure (save for the entrance). One of them holds the grave of Baba Rukn al-Din. His grave has a tombstone made of marble.

== Gallery ==
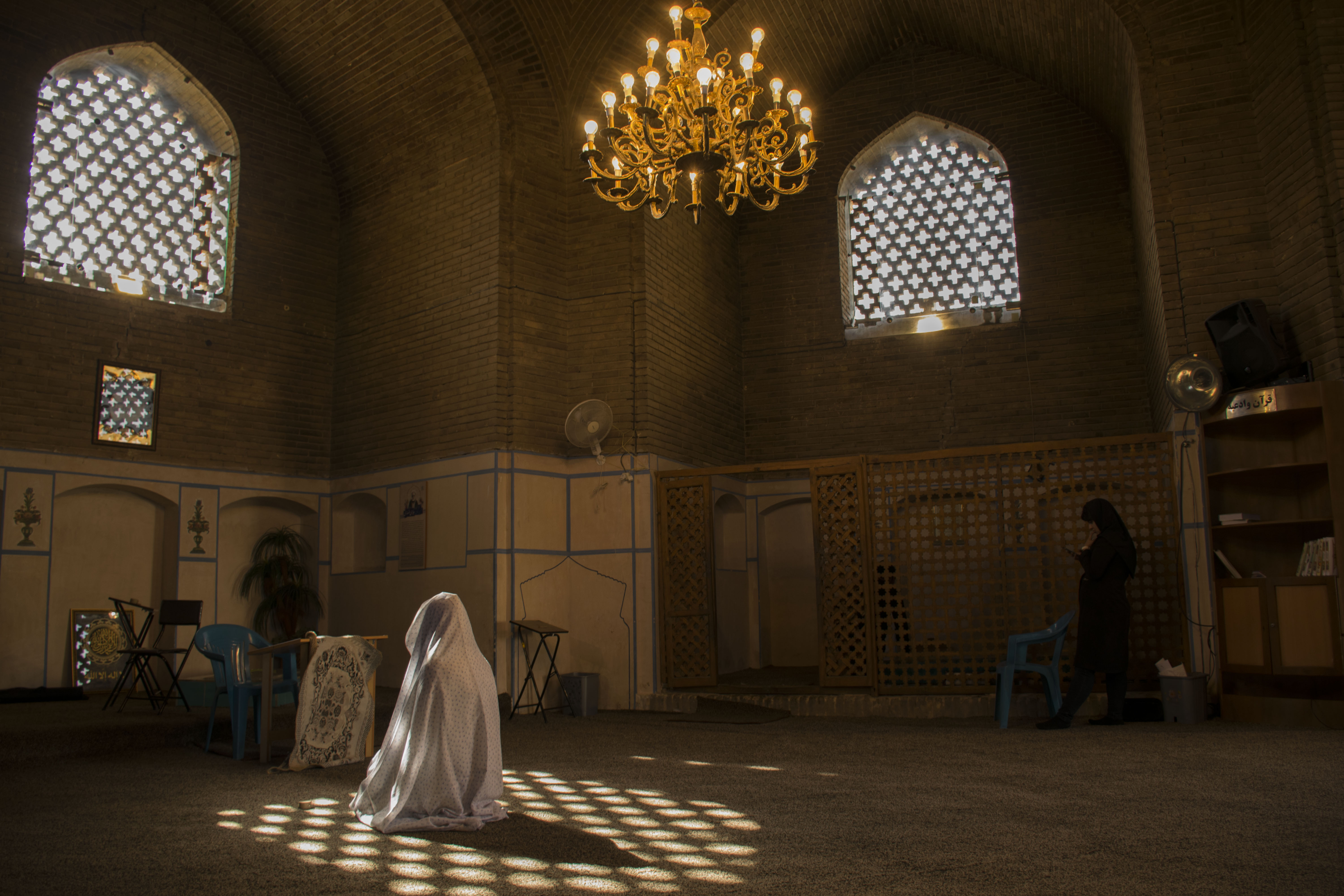
Mausoleum interior

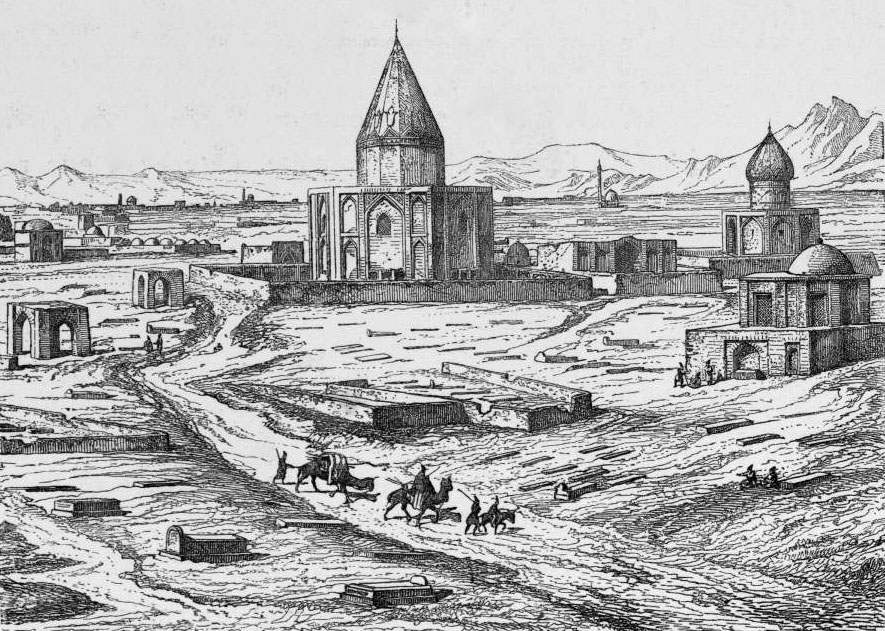
An illustration of the mausoleum by Pascal Coste, 1840

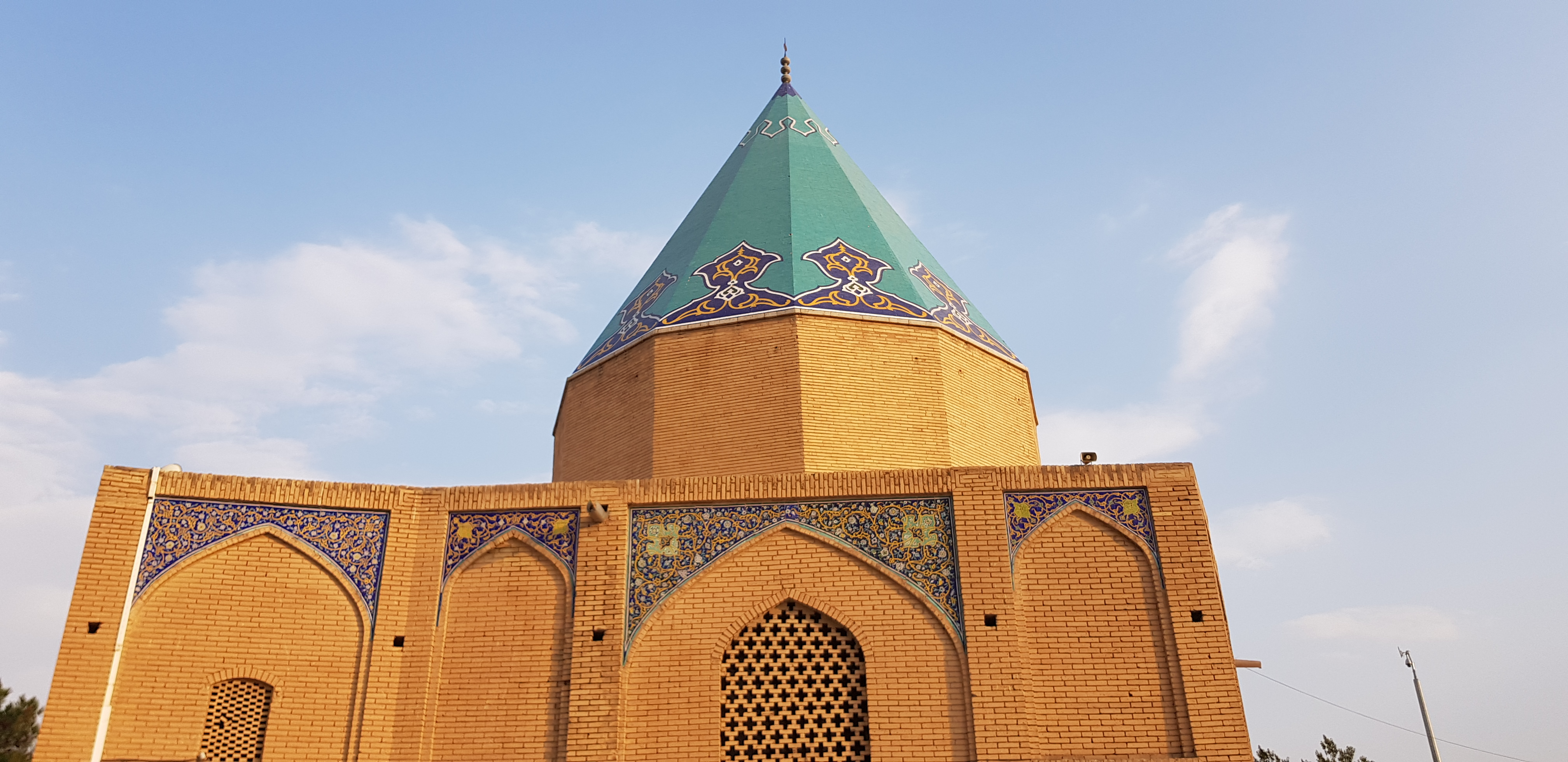
A close up of the mausoleum's exterior

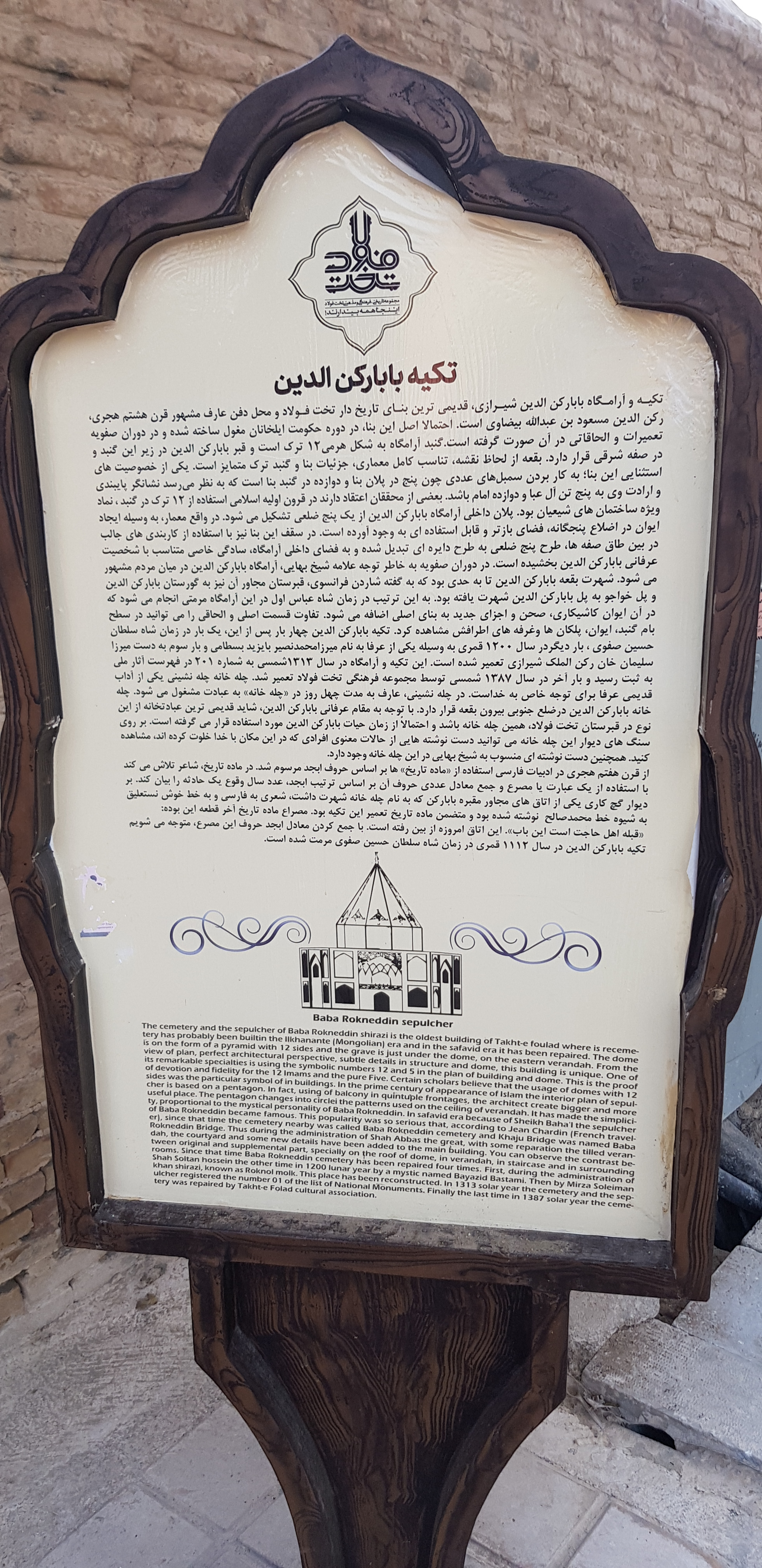
A signboard outside of the mausoleum

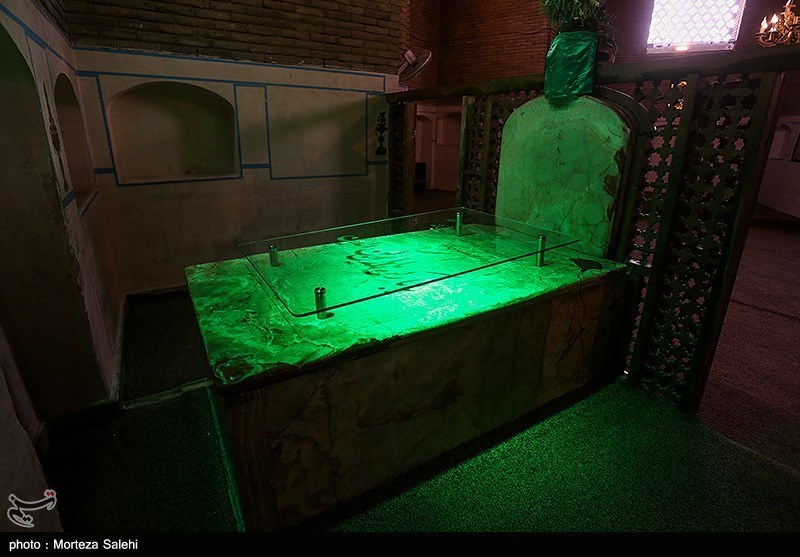
The grave of Baba Rukn al-Din inside the mausoleum

== See also ==
- Baba Rukn al-Din
- List of mausoleums in Iran
- Islam in Iran
