= Baba Rokneddin Shirazi =

Iranian poet

Mas'ūd ibn ʿAbd Allah Bayḍawi
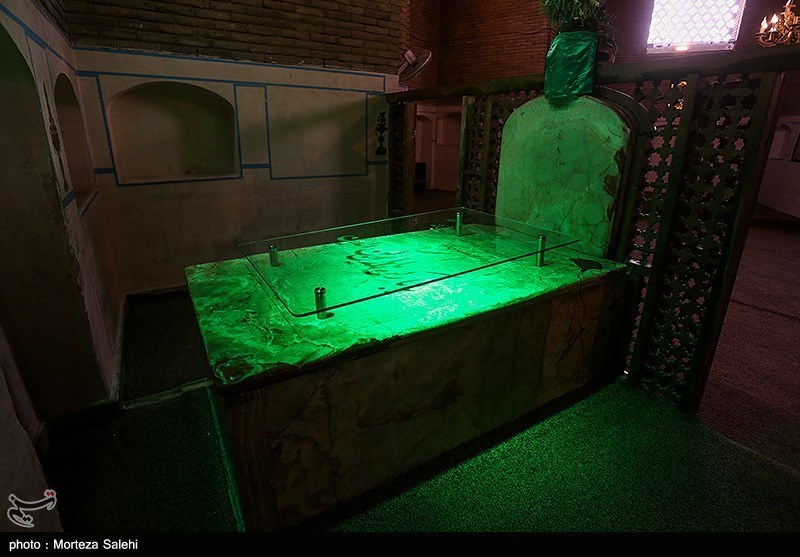
- The tomb of Baba Rukn al-Din in his mausoleum at Takht-e Foulad cemetery, Isfahan

Baba Rukn al-Din
- Born: Masoud ibn Abdullah al-Baydawi; Shiraz
- Died: 1367 or 1368; Isfahan
- Venerated in: Shi'ism and sects of Sunnism who venerate mystics
- Major shrine: Mausoleum of Baba Rokneddin in Takht-e Foulad cemetery, Isfahan, Iran
- Influences: Ibn Arabi, Abd al-Razzaq Kāshānī, Dawud al-Qaysari, Nu'man al-Khwarizmi

Mas'ūd b. ʿAbd Allah al-Bayḍawi (Persian: مسعود ب. عبدالله بیضایی) more commonly known as Baba Rukn al-Din Shirazi or Baba Rokneddin Shirazi (died 1367 or 1368) was a 14th-century Sufi mystic and follower of Ibn Arabi. His name means Father Rukn al-Din, the latter which transliterates as "Pillar of the Faith."

== Biography ==
From childhood, Masud ibn Abdullah had an interest in Sufism. He eventually studied and learned spirituality and started his mystical journey at a young age. He studied the basics of Sufism under Abdul Razzaq al-Kashani. He then studied the Fusus al-Hikam of Ibn Arabi under Dawud al-Qaysari, with help from Nu'man al-Khwarizmi. In adulthood, he wrote many works on Sufism and scholarly knowledge, such as a commentary and exegesis of the Fusus al-Hikam.

== Works ==
Some of his most famous works:

- Nusus al-khusus fi tarjimat al-fusus: A commentary and exegesis on Ibn Arabi's Fusus al-Hikam. It was reprinted in 1980 by Tehrani publishers.
- Kashf al-durr fi nazm al-durr: A commentary on the al-Ta'iya al-kubra work from Ibn Farid. This work exists in manuscript format, and is preserved in national libraries in Iran.

== See also ==
- Ibn Arabi
- List of Sufi saints

== Sources ==
- Shams, Mohammad Javad (2020). "بابا رکن الدین شیرازی". The Great Islamic Encyclopaedia (in Persian).
