= Takht-e Foulad =

Historic cemetery in Isfahan, Iran

- تخت فولاد
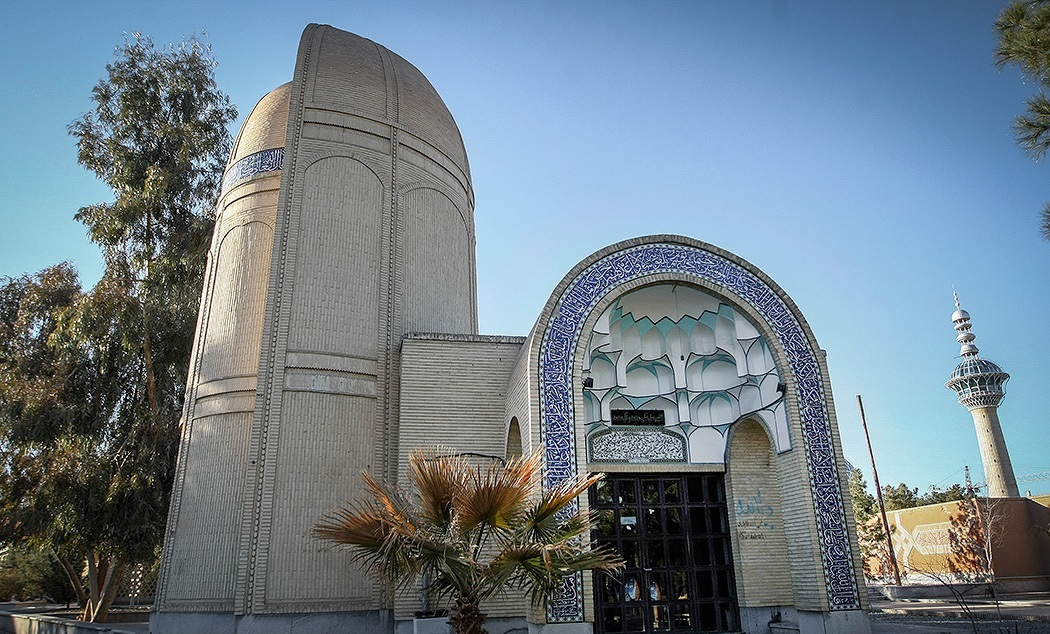
- The main iwan portal gateway to Takht-e Foulad cemetery
- Interactive map of Takht-e Foulad

Details
- Established: c. 10th century CE
- Location: Valeh St, Takht Foulad, Esfahan, Isfahan province
- Country: Iran
- Coordinates: 32°37′39″N 51°40′59″E
- Type: Public, Islamic; historic
- Style: Safavid architecture
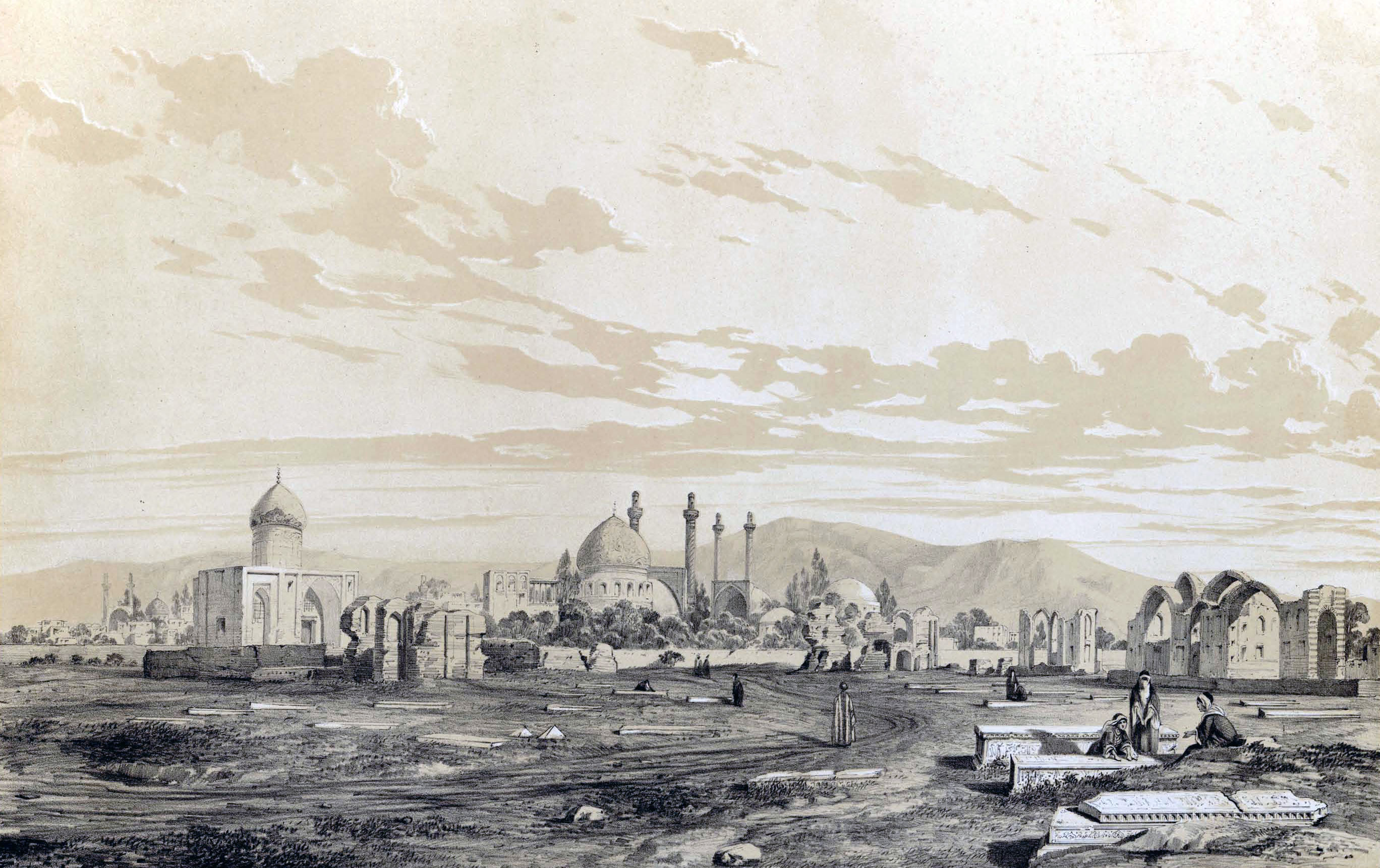
- The cemetery depicted by Eugéne Flandin, during the reign of Mohammad Shah Qajar

Iran National Heritage List
- Official name: Takht-e Foulad
- Type: Built
- Designated: 15 June 1996
- Reference no.: 1735
- Conservation organization: Cultural Heritage, Handicrafts and Tourism Organization of Iran

The Takht-e Foulad (Persian: تخت فولاد), also known as Lissanul Arz (Persian: لسان‌الارض), is a historical, predominately Islamic, cemetery located in Esfahan, in the province of Isfahan, Iran. It is a large funerary complex that includes several historic mausoleums, mosques, tekyehs, sub-cemeteries and standalone graves. It is estimated that the cemetery was established in c. 10th century CE and is noted for its Safavid architecture.

The cemetery was added to the Iran National Heritage List on 15 June 1996 and is administered by the Cultural Heritage, Handicrafts and Tourism Organization of Iran.

== History ==
The exact origins of the cemetery are not known, but some historians have theorised that it may have pre-Islamic origins. During the rule of the Mongol Ilkhanate in the 14th century, the mausoleum of Baba Rokneddin Shirazi was built, and the cemetery was named after him. The cemetery subsequently became a place for Sufi dervishes to have mystical gatherings.

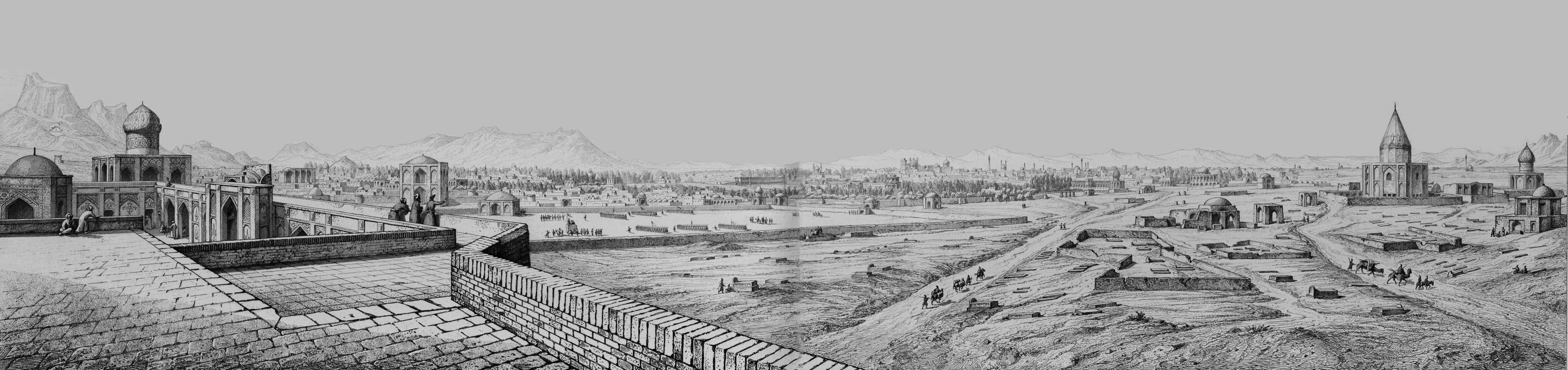
A panorama of the cemetery in the 19th century by Pascal Coste, published 1840

The cemetery was expanded during the Safavid era, under the rule of Shah Suleiman I. But later on during the rule of the Safavid Shah Soltan Hoseyn, many of the mausoleums from the Ilkhanid era were demolished, under the orders of Mohammad-Baqer Majlesi, the Shaykh-ol Islam hired by the ruler. The Sufis and their dervishes were also banned from visiting the cemetery, regardless whether they were Shi'ite or not. During the rule of Nader Shah Afshar, the cemetery was largely ignored, save for a small number of burials.

During the Qajar era, Fath-Ali Shah Qajar built a takyeh in the cemetery, which he dedicated to his mother. In the 20th century, however, Mass'oud Mirza Zell-e Soltan, the Qajar prince who governed Isfahan, demolished several Safavid-era structures in the cemetery. Later on, in the 1980s, a sub-cemetery was established around the grave of cleric Abolhassan Shamsabadi, and in the cemetery were buried those who were killed in the Haft-e Tir Bombing and the Iranian Revolution.

During the Pahlavi era, the cemetery had become full. Locals were then forbidden from carrying out any further burials. They were still allowed to visit the sites in the cemetery, however.

== Landmarks in the cemetery ==
=== Mausoleum of Baba Rokneddin ===
Baba Rukn al-Din, or Baba Rokneddin, was one of the most prominent Persian Sufis of the 14th century. He died in 1367, and the mausoleum was built during the Ilkhanid era. It had fallen into disrepair later on and was restored during the Safavid era under Shah Abbas I. It is the only structure from the Ilkhanid era to survive till modern day.

=== Khatoon Abadi Mausoleum ===
One of the takyeh buildings located in the cemetery. Clerics belonging to the Khatoon Abadi family are buried in there, an example being Mohammed Hossein Khatunabadi, a Shi'ite Hadith scholar. There is a small cellar underneath the tomb, speculated to be a place where the ascetic-inclined Khatunabadi secluded himself and meditated.

=== Mausoleum of Mir Fendereski ===
The burial place of the famous mystic and scholar in the Safavid era, Mir Fendereski. His grave has a stone tombstone, which bears the date 1640, the year he died. Next to the grave, a ghazal of the poet Hafez, in the Nastaliq script, made with stucco, by Mir Emad Hassani, is visible on the wall of the place.

=== Mausoleum of Agha Hossein Khansari ===
Agha Hossein Khansari was a very influential scientist and scholar in the court of the Safavid ruler Suleiman I. His mausoleum is topped with a single cupola dome, and it is the only mausoleum in the cemetery which was built for a scientist or engineer.

=== Roknolmolk Mosque ===
It was formerly known as the Aksa Mosque. The mosque was built in the Qajar era, and is at the edge of the Takht-e Foulad cemetery. The mosque has a room that contains the graves of both Roknolmolk and his wife, located near to the entrance, as well as a mausoleum for clerics of the Kalbasi family.

=== Mohammad Jafar Abadei Tekyeh ===
Established by the Qajar viceroy, Roknolmolk, named for the Shi'ite scholar, Mohammad Ja'far Abadei. It is adjacent to the Roknolmolk Mosque.

== Golestan-e Shohada Cemetery ==
This smaller sub-cemetery is attached to the cemetery of Takht-e Foulad. The cemetery is where several martyrs are buried, hence the name Shohada, is a Persianised form of the word Shuhada which means Martyr in Arabic. One of the first burials in the cemetery is that of Abolhassan Shamsabadi. Those killed in the Haft-e Tir Bombing of 1981, and those who lost their lives during the Iranian Revolution are buried here as well.

Within the cemetery, there is also a cenotaph attributed as a grave to the Biblical prophet Joshua however there is no evidence that he is buried there.

== Gallery ==
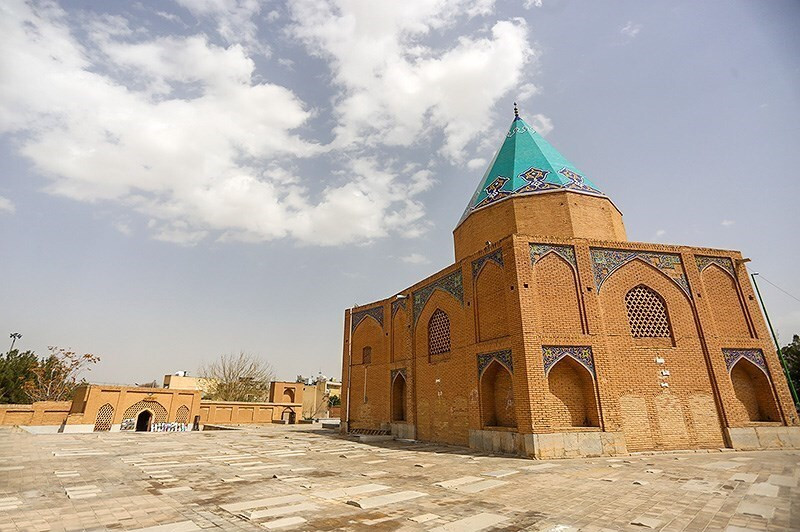
Mausoleum of Baba Rokneddin

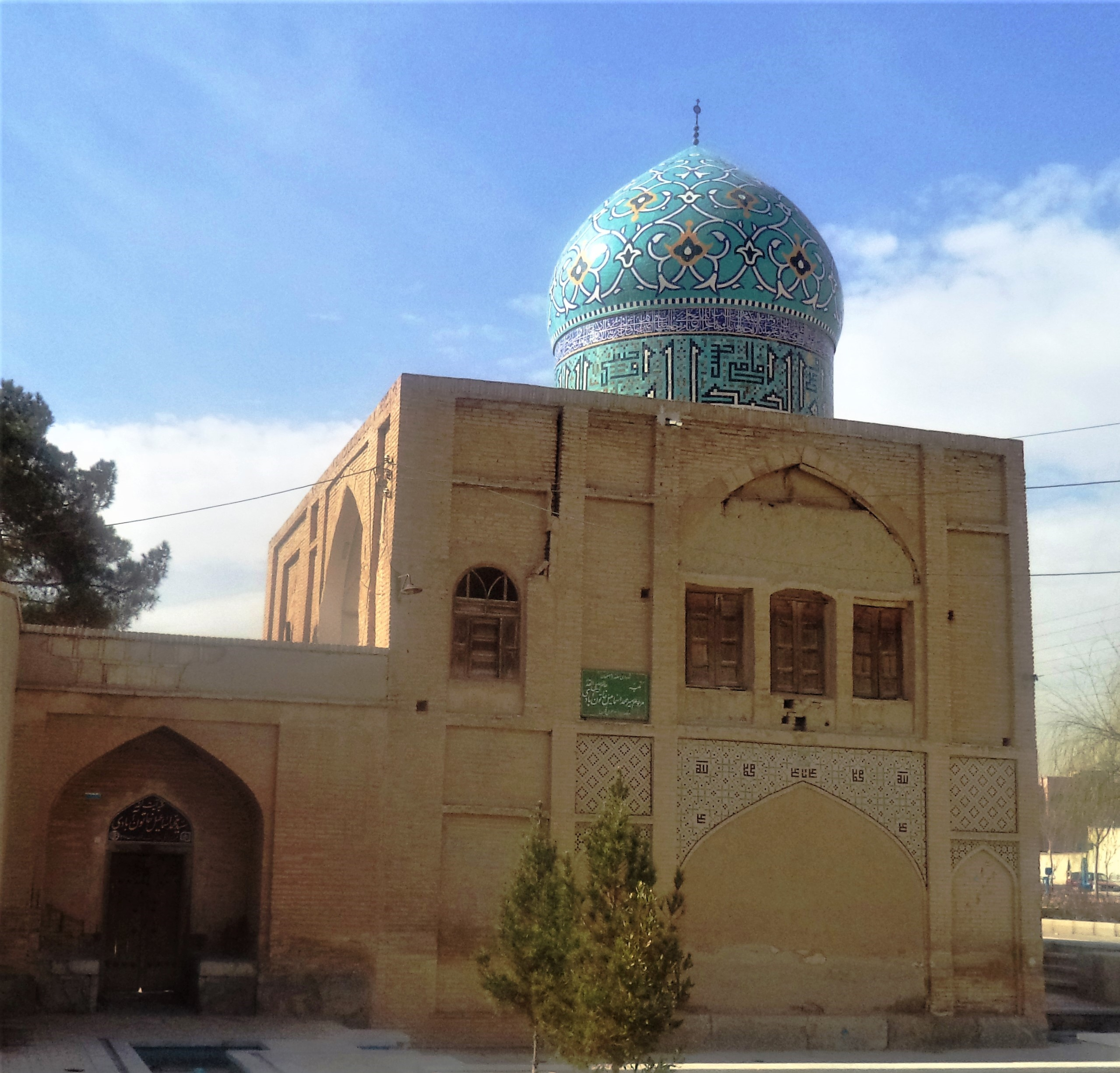
The mausoleum and takyeh housing the remains of the Khatunabadi family

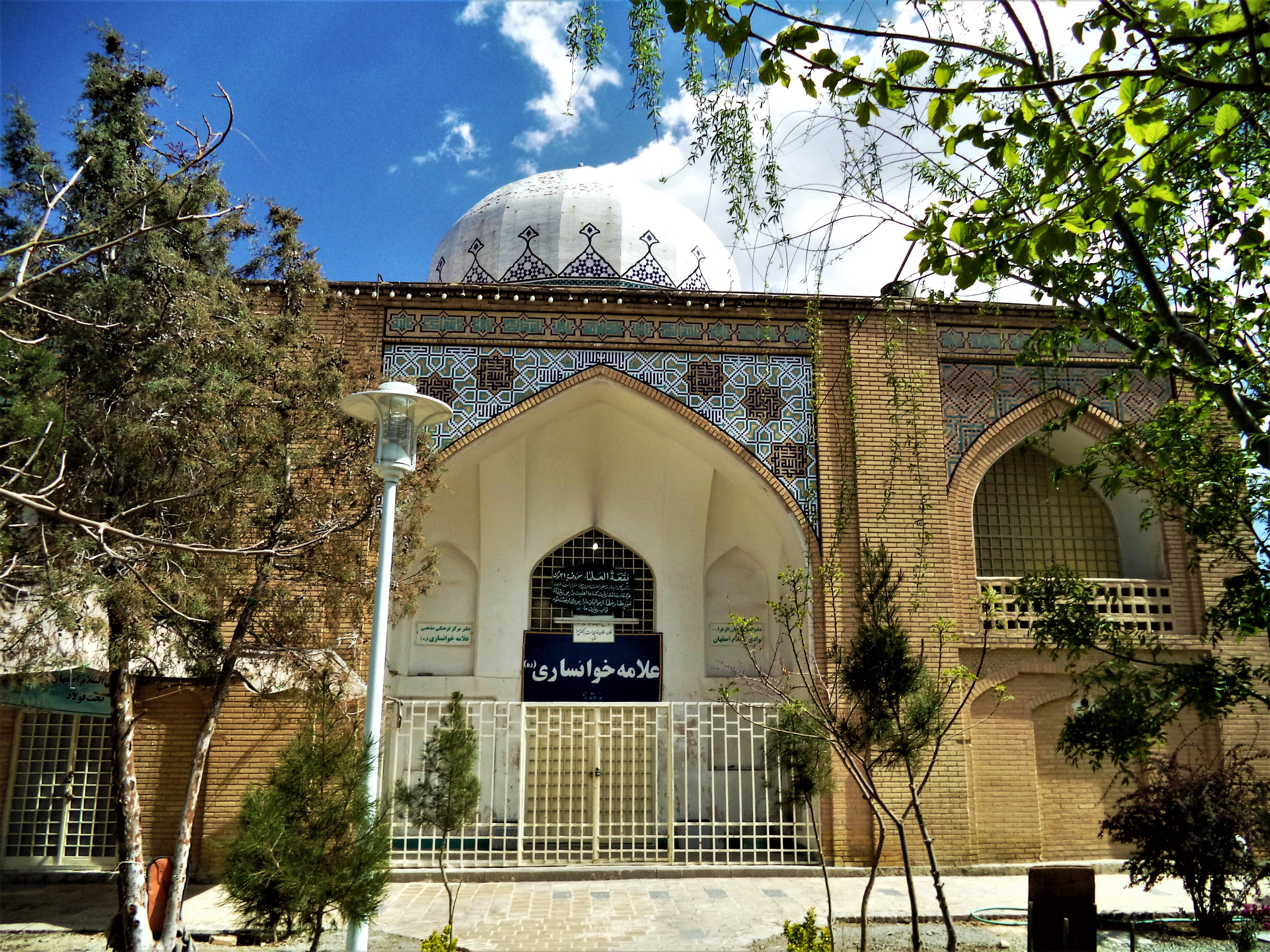
Mausoleum of Agha Hossein Khansari

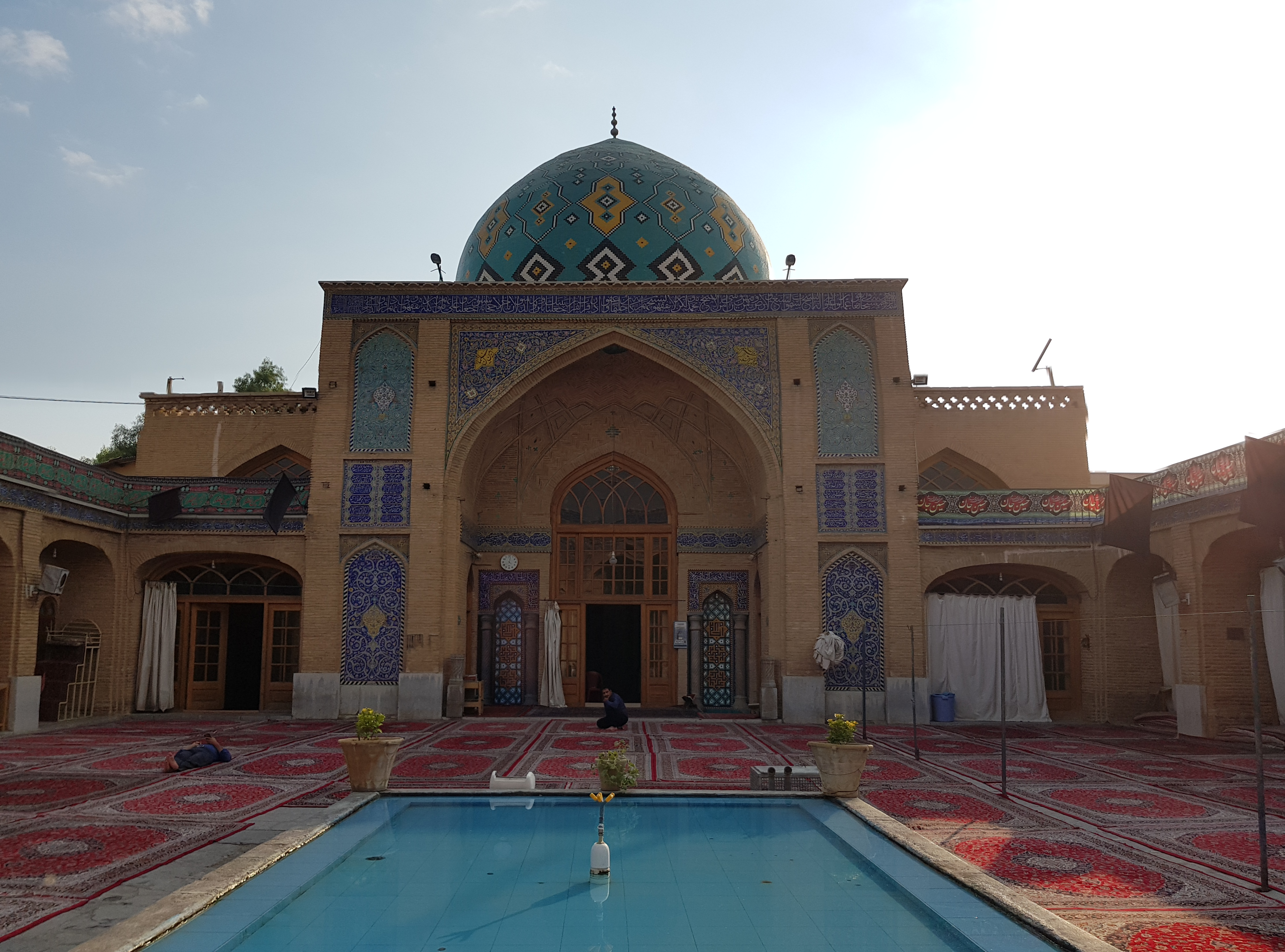
Roknolmolk Mosque

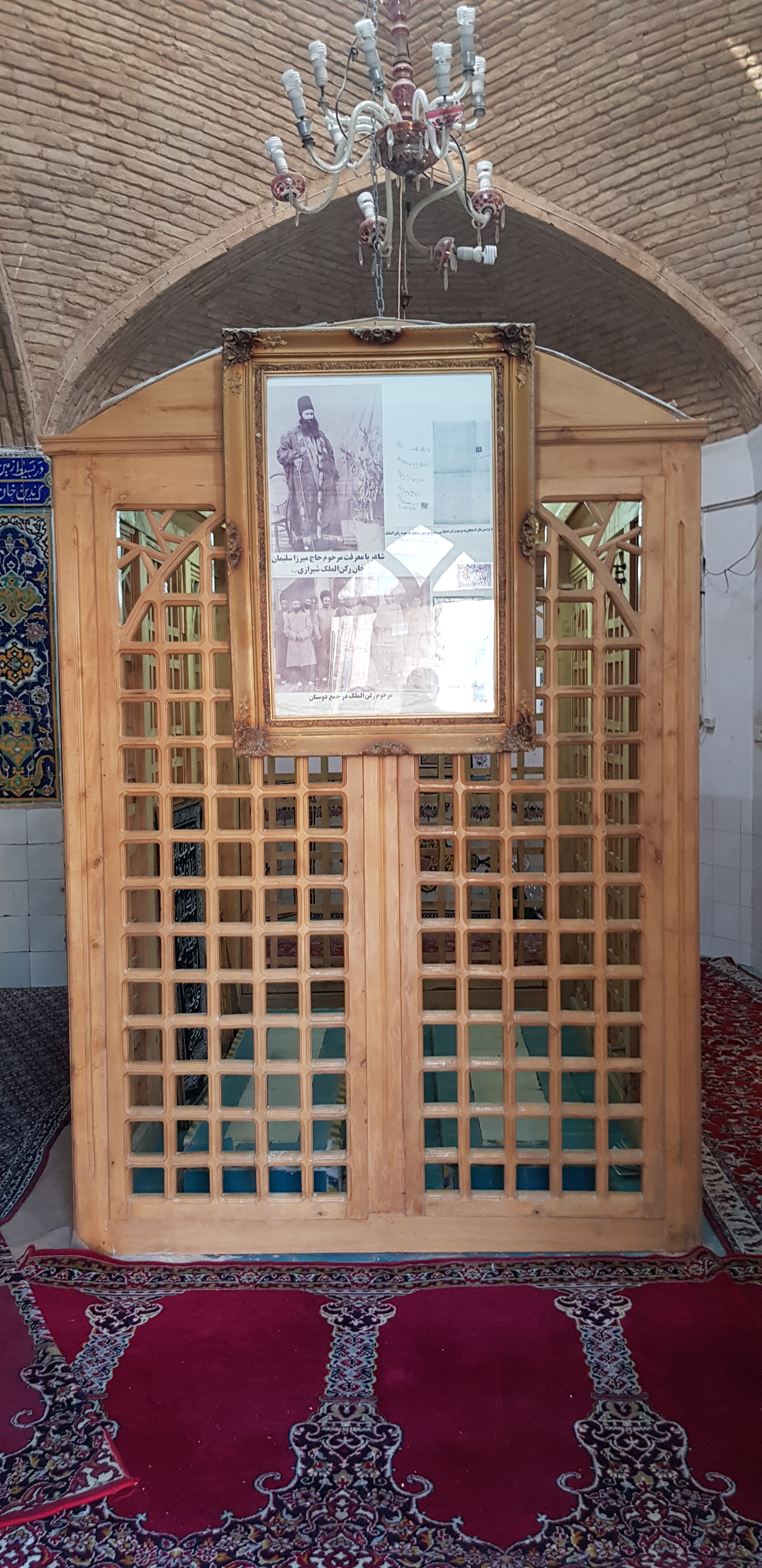
Tomb of Roknolmolk inside the mosque

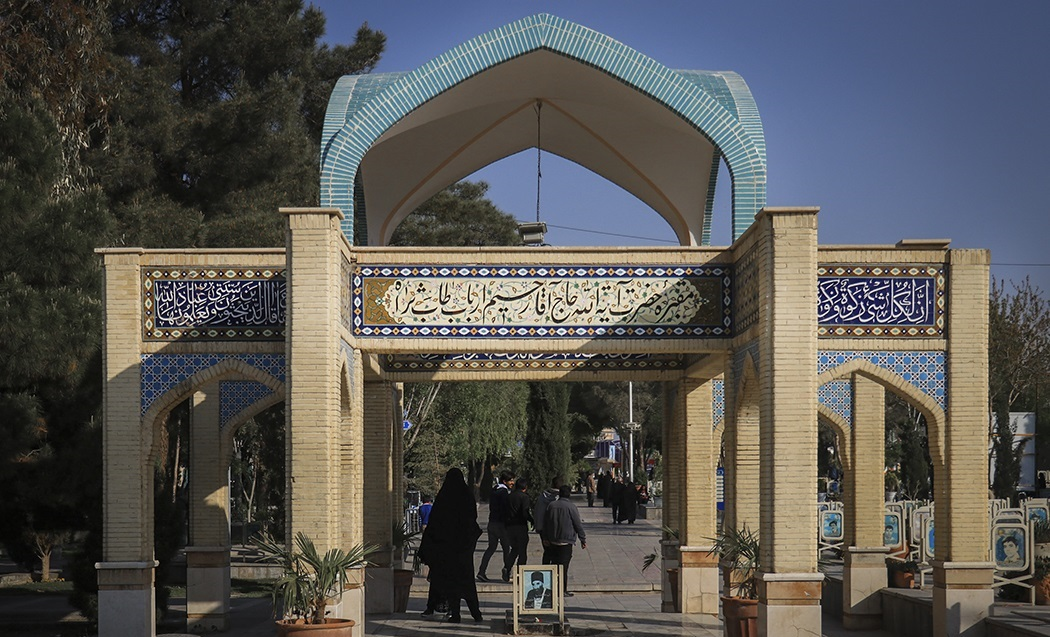
Entrance to the Golestan-e Shohada Cemetery

== See also ==
- List of historical structures in Isfahan
- List of mausoleums in Iran
