= Roknolmolk =

Iranian author and politician (1839–1914)

Mirza Soleyman Khan Shirazi
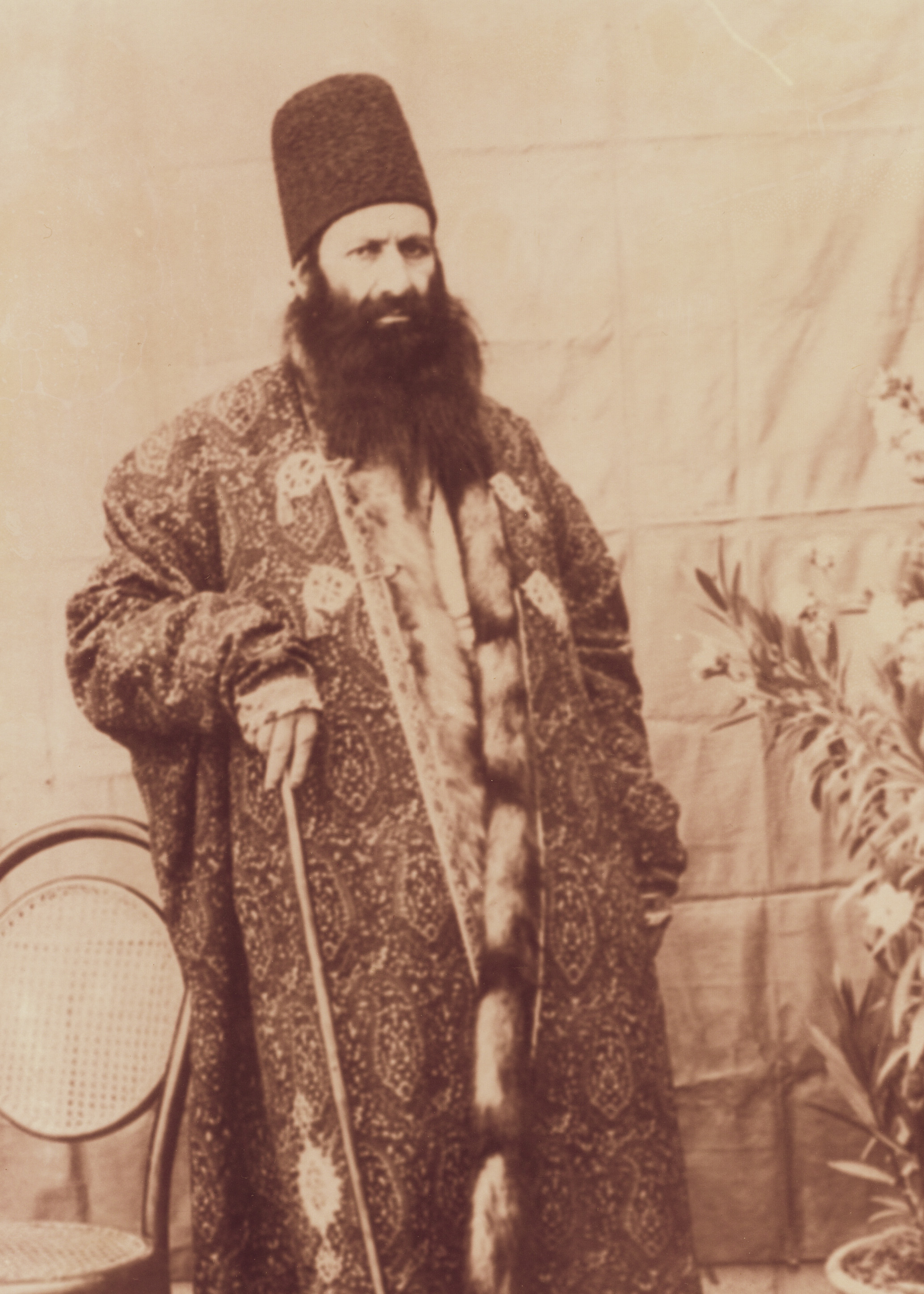
- Photograph of Roknolmolk

Roknolmolk (Support of the Sovereignty)
- Born: 1839; Shiraz, Qajar Iran
- Died: 1914; Isfahan, Qajar Iran
- Major shrine: Buried in his tomb at the Roknolmolk Mosque, Isfahan, Iran
- Attributes: Viceroy of Isfahan under the Qajar government, secretary of the governor of Fars
- Major works: Roknolmolk Mosque and Mohammad Jafar Abadei Tekyeh

Mirza Soleyman Khan Shirazi, (Persian: میرزا سلیمان خان شیرازی; 1839–1914), also known as Roknolmolk (رکن‌الملک), was a poet and viceroy of Isfahan during the Qajar era. He was also the secretary of the governor of Fars province. Roknolmolk is also the founder of the mosque named after him and Mohammad Jafar Abadei Tekyeh, both sites located in Isfahan.

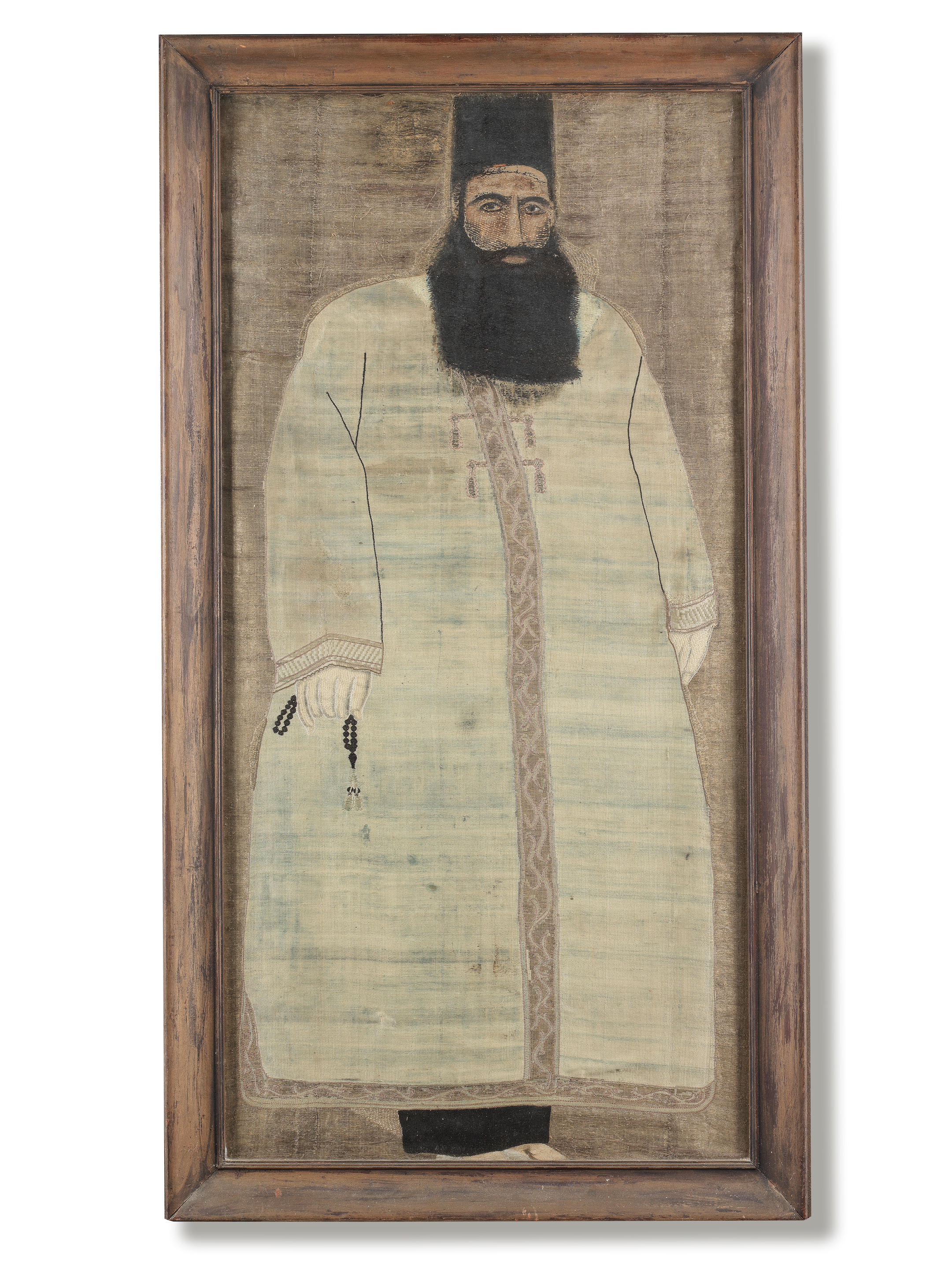
An illustration of a Qajar official on silk canvas, theorised to have been a depiction of Roknolmolk

== Biography ==
Mirza Soleyman Khan Shirazi was born in 1839, to a family who descended from one of Shah Ismail I's commanders. In 1886, he became the secretary to Mass'oud Mirza Zell-e Soltan, who was governor of Isfahan and Fars. During his time as a secretary, he established a factory, which was a printing press, where copies of the Qur'an were printed alongside some other books such as Ibn al-Qayyim's Za'd al-Ma'ad. He also founded a mosque which was named after him and a tekyeh for a Shi'ite cleric, Mohammed Ja'far Abadei.

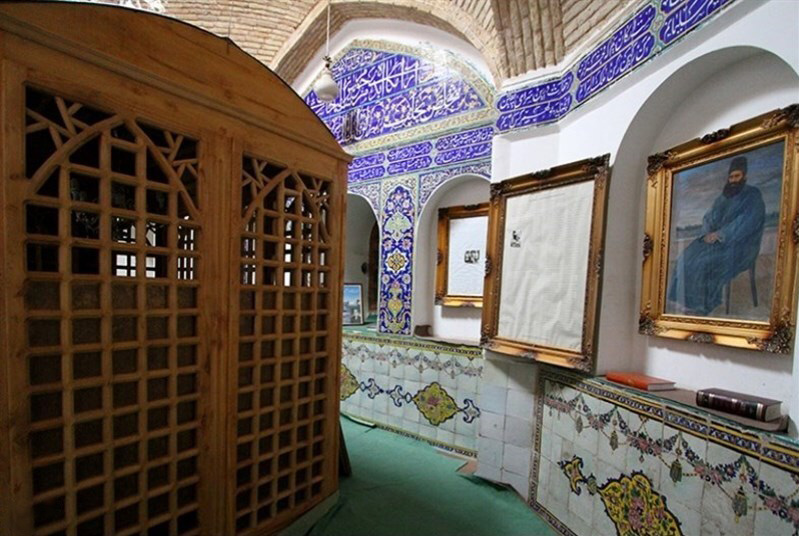
Roknolmolk's tomb inside his mosque

Roknolmolk died in Isfahan in 1914. He is buried alongside his wife at the mosque he founded, located near the cemetery of Takht-e Foulad.

== See also ==
- Qajar dynasty
- Rabi' al-Madkhali
