= Shah Rokn al-Din Bathhouse =

Bath of Shah Rokn al-Din
- حمام شاه رکن‌الدین (Persian); کتاب‌خانه عمومی شاه رکن الدین (Persian)
- A photo of the place after the reconstruction
- Interactive map of Bath of Shah Rokn al-Din
- Location: Dezful, Dezful County, Khuzestan province, Iran

History
- Built for: Safavid dynasty
- Rebuilt: 2006 (۱۳۸۵ shamsi date )

Site notes
- Owner: Cultural Heritage, Handicrafts and Tourism Organization of Iran
- Website: weblogکتابخانه عمومی شاه رکن الدین (weblog Shah Rokn-ad-din Public Library)

The Shah Rokn al-Din Bathhouse or Bath of Shah Rukn al-Din dates back to the Safavid era and is located in Shah district of Rokn al-Din, Dezful. The bathhouse was registered as a national monument of Iran on 9 May 2003 with the registration number 8379.

== Restoration and transformation of the bathroom into the library ==
In 2006, Shamsi was quoted as saying by the IRNA media that the bath of Rokn al-Din Shah is being repaired. Gholam Ali Baghban, director of the cultural heritage of Dezful, announced that measures such as water and sewage network reform, the redevelopment of electricity grids and redevelopment are ongoing, and after a long time the reconstruction of the place has become a cafe and library.

== Gallery ==
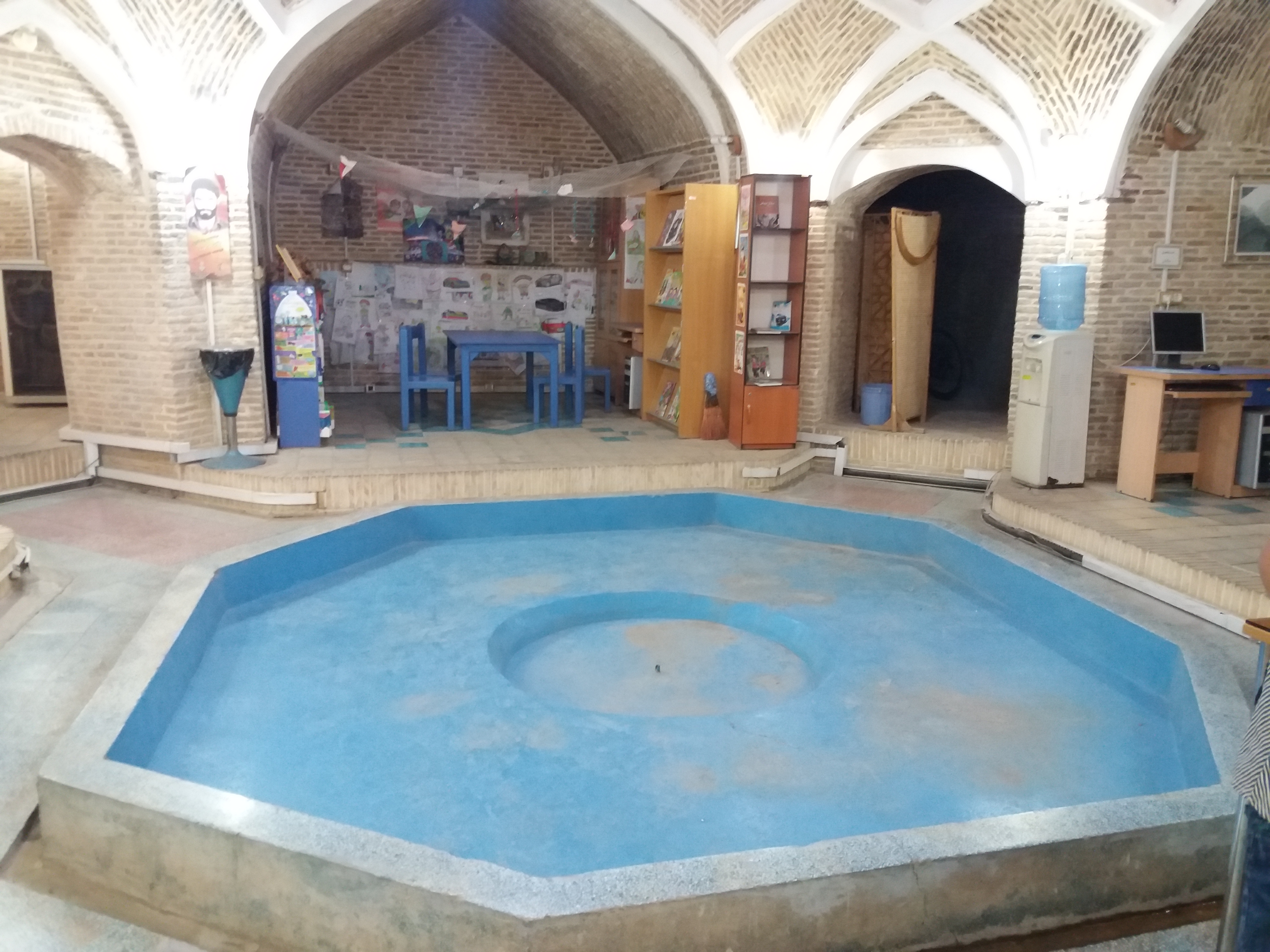
Refurbished dock photo bath of shah rukn al-din Photo by Hossein Daramad

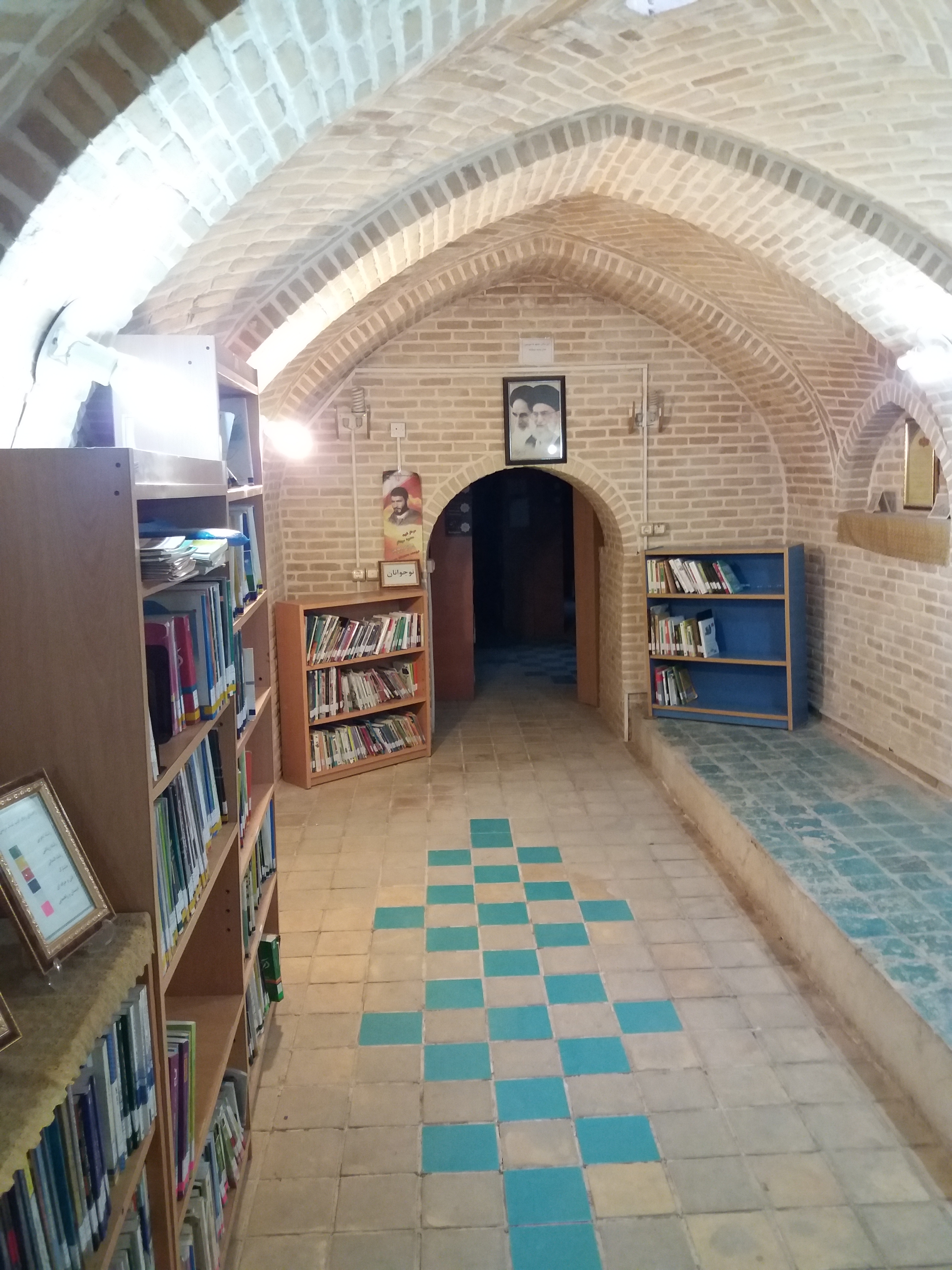
Picture of a downstairs and a teenager's bookcase the Bath of Shah Rokn al-Din Photo by Hossein Daramad

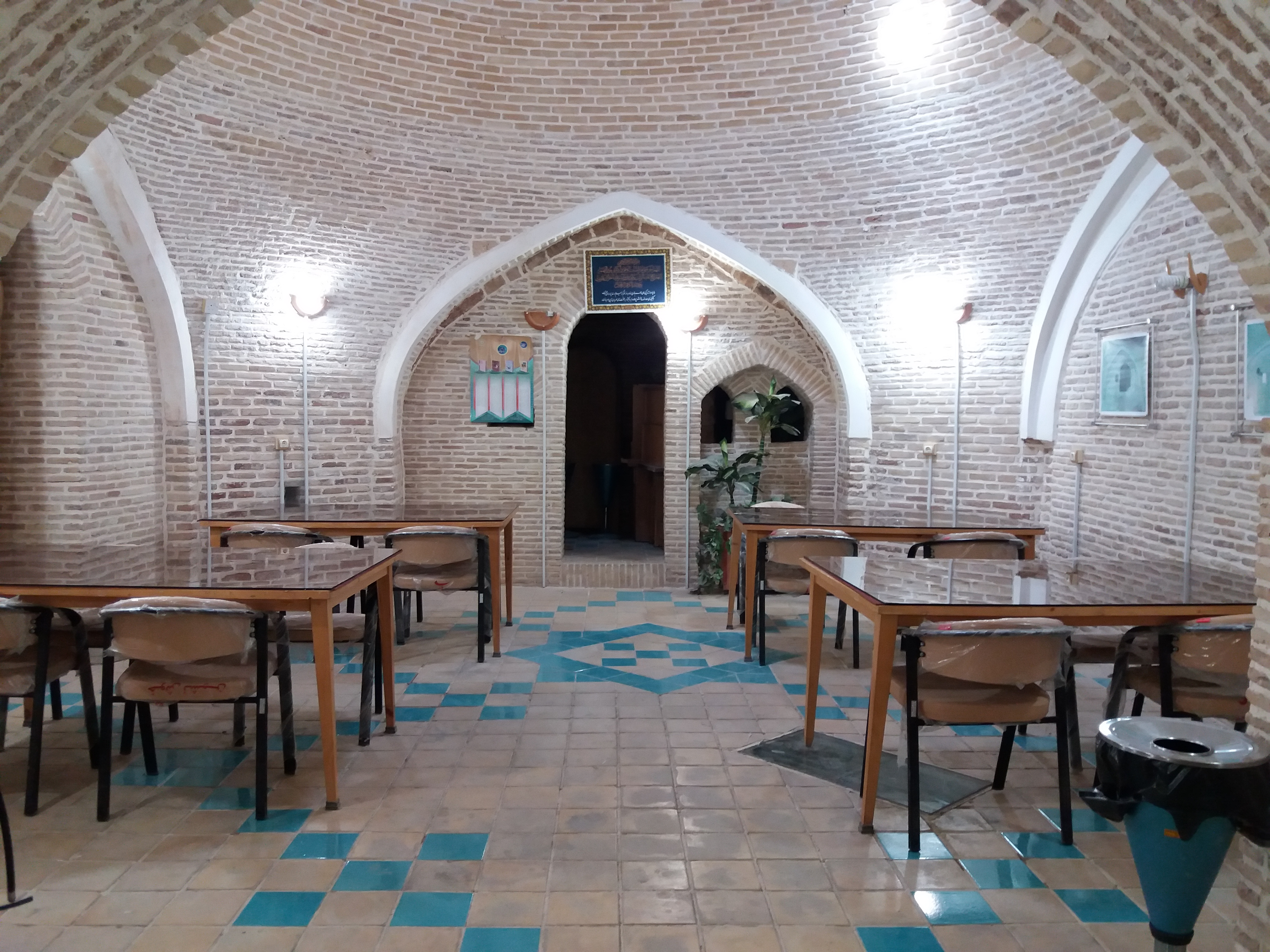
Picture of downstairs study hall the Bath of Shah Rokn al-Din Photo by Hossein Daramad

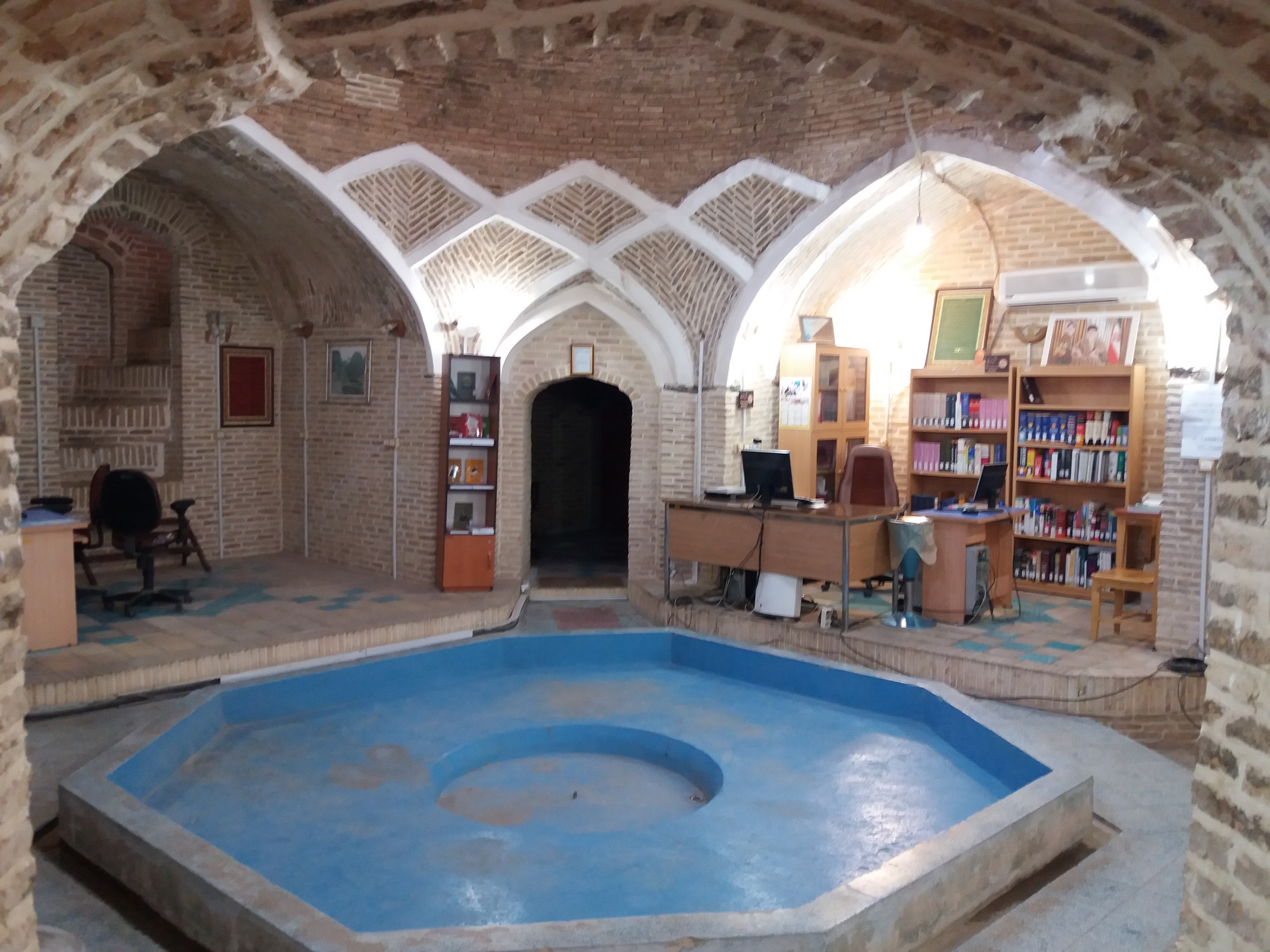
Picture of the interior the Bath of Shah Rokn al-Din Photo by Hossein Daramad

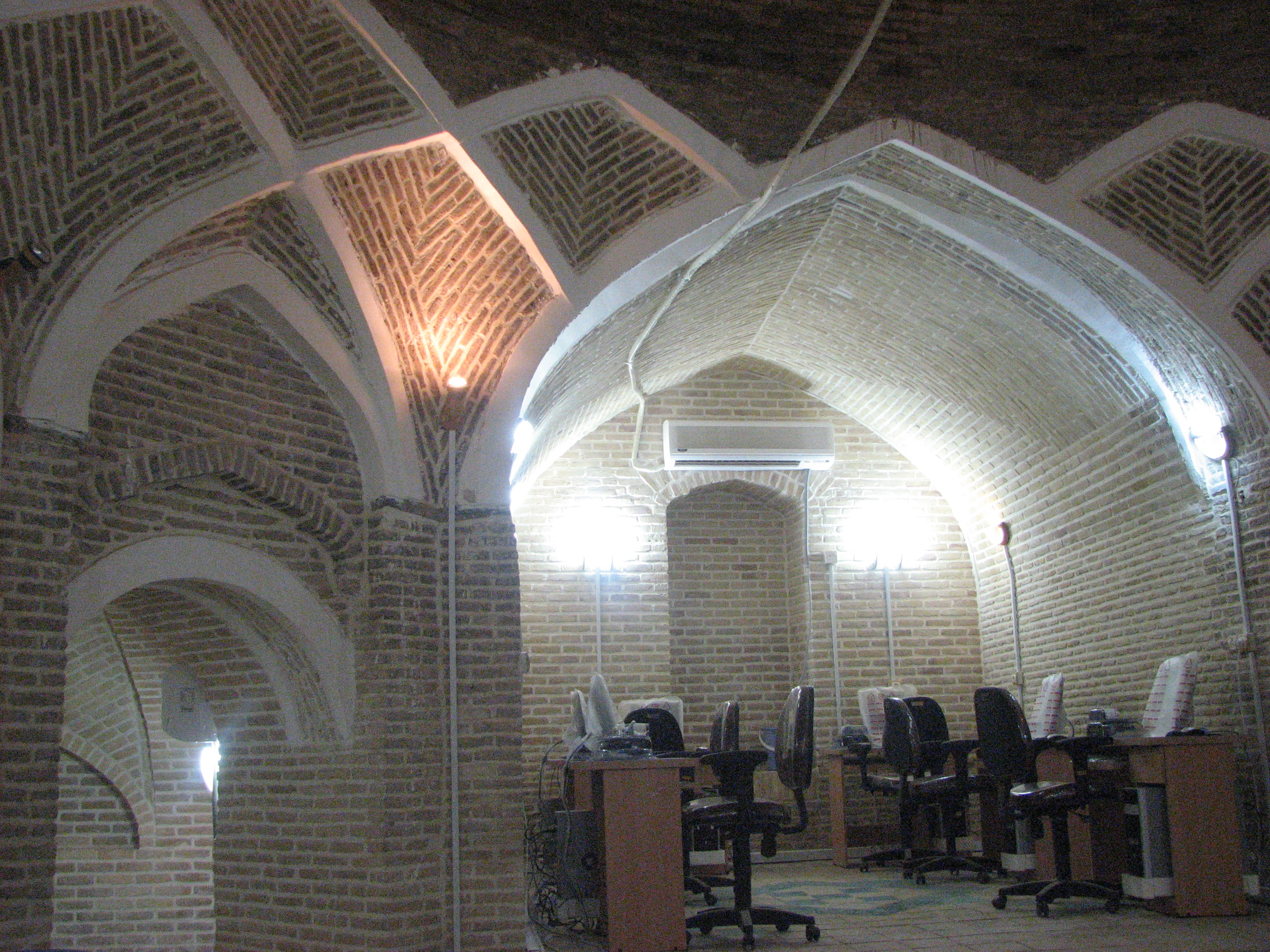
Picture of the 2007 cafe section bath of shah rukn al-Din the lower floor of the study hall

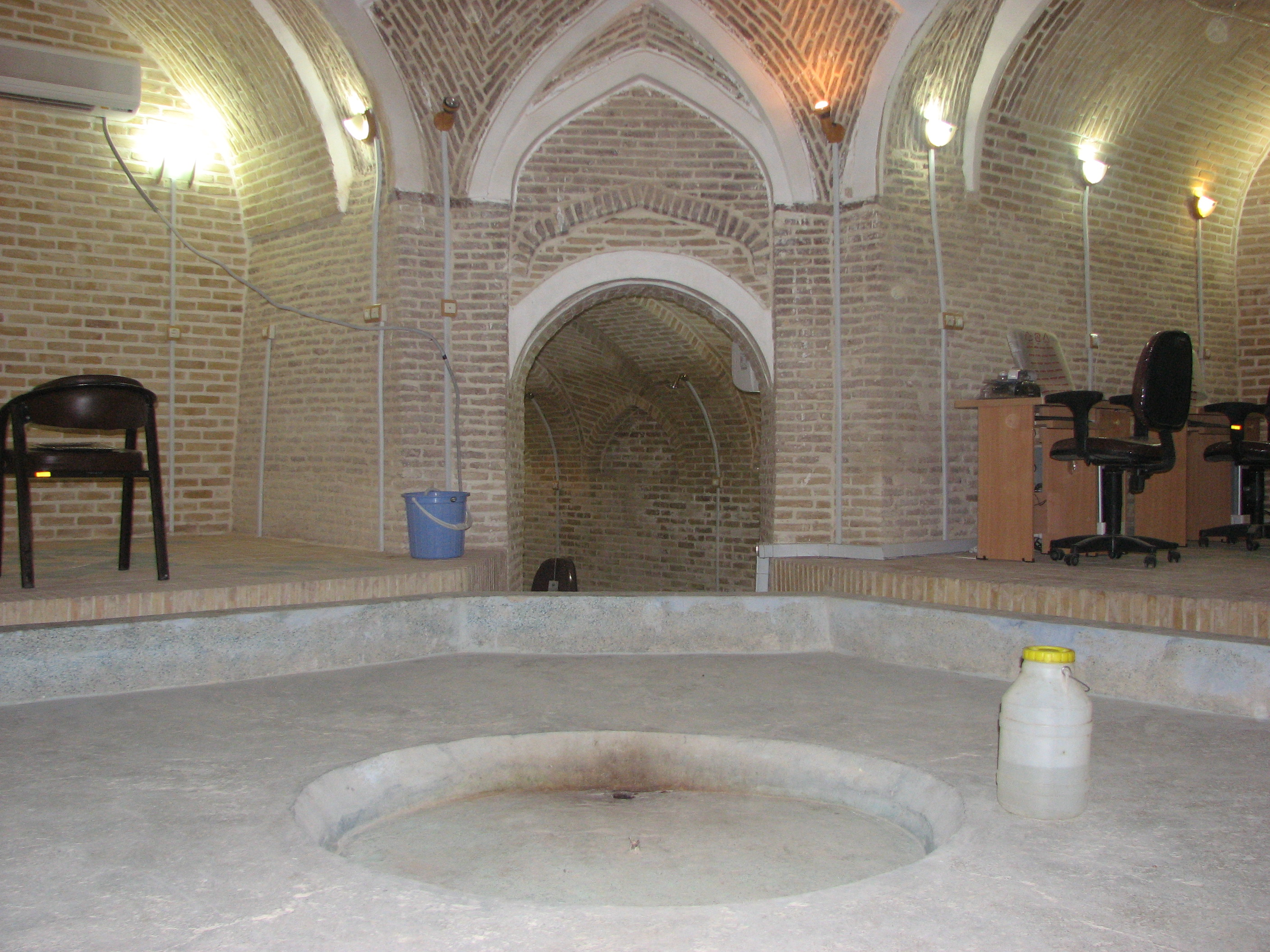
An image of the bath of shah rukn al-din in 2007 before full restoration

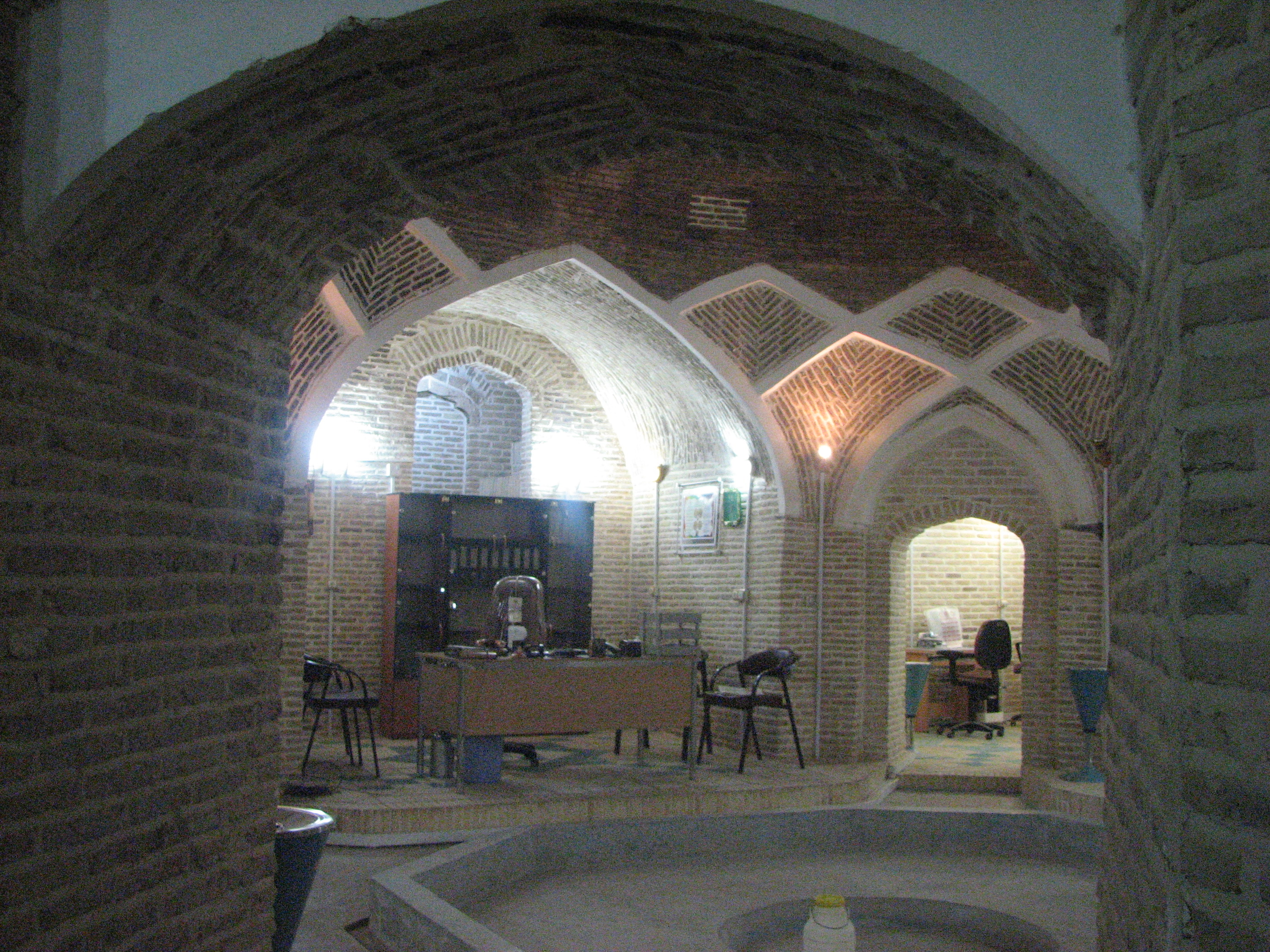
An image of the King Rikn al-Din Bathroom Management section before complete restoration in 2007

== See also ==
- Cultural Heritage, Handicrafts and Tourism Organization of Iran
