= Golbarg Bashi =

Swedish-Iranian academic (born 1974)

- Persian: گلبرگ باشی
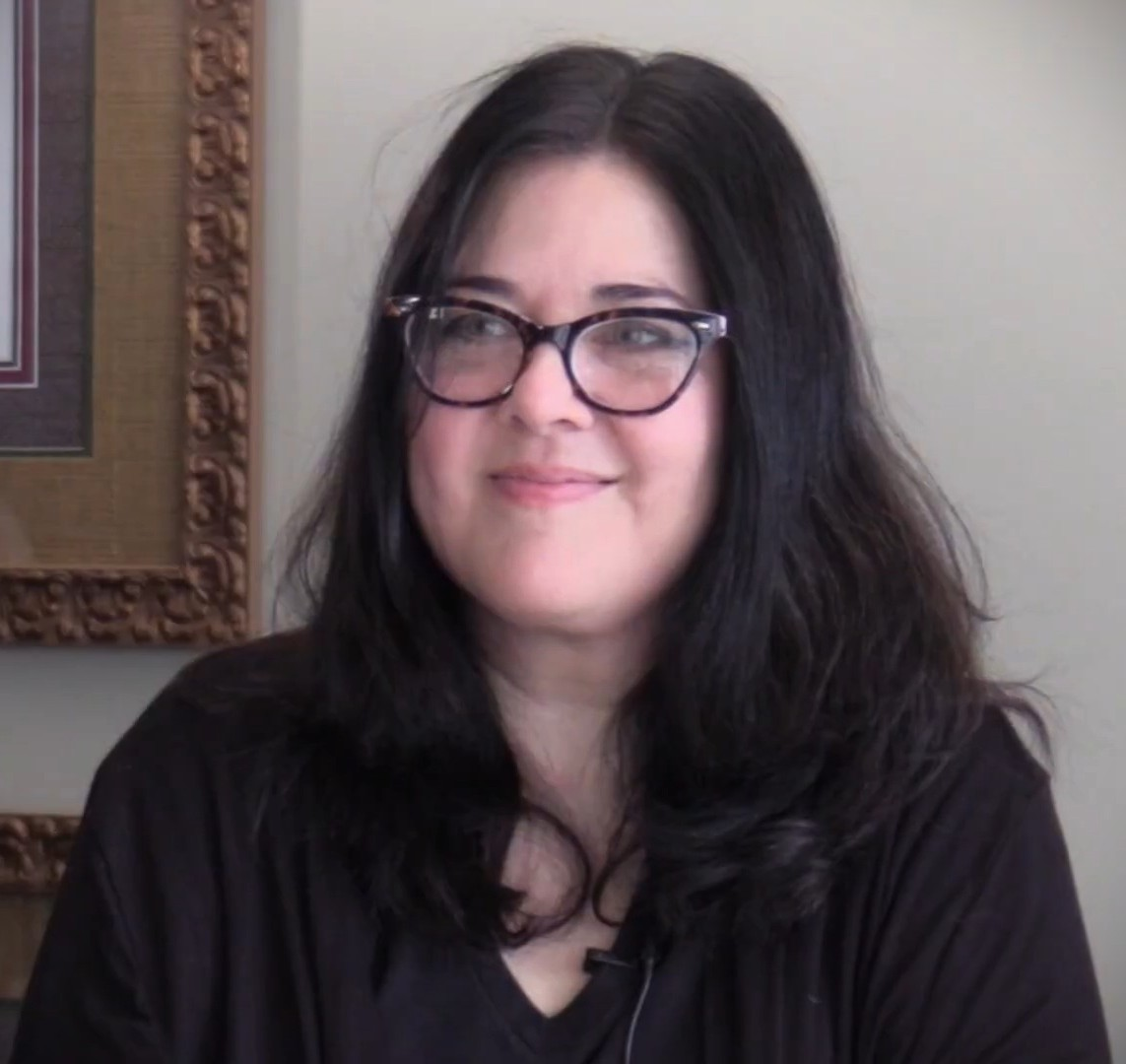
- Bashi in 2022
- Born: 6 January 1974 (age 52); Ahvaz, Iran
- Education: University of Manchester; University of Bristol; Columbia University
- Occupations: Writer, educator, artist, politician
- Spouse: Hamid Dabashi (div.)
- Children: 2
- Website: Official website

Golbarg Bashi (Persian: گلبرگ باشی; born 6 January 1974, Ahvaz, Iran) is an Iranian-Swedish feminist and former adjunct lecturer of Iranian studies in the US. Among other topics, Bashi has published works and given talks about human rights in the Middle East and the situation of women in Iran.

== Biography ==
Golbarg Bashi was born 06.01.1974 in Iran, raised in Sweden, and educated at the Universities of Manchester and Bristol and obtained her doctorate degree from Columbia University in New York City. Her doctoral research focused on a feminist critique of the human rights discourse in Iran.

Bashi is the author of the 2017 children's book P is for Palestine: A Palestine Book, an English-language alphabet book about Palestine, written from a social-justice perspective. The book also promotes Palestinian nationalism. She has also published a sequel.

In 2016, she was nominated for a U.S. toy industry award where she was shortlisted in the Designer/Inventor category at the Women In Toys 'Wonder Woman' Awards. Fellow nominees included executives at Disney, Mattel, Lego, and Hasbro.

Bashi is also a visual artist. Her images have been published in the New York Times, Aljazeera English, CNN, BBC News, and Amnesty International.

In 2002, Bashi was a member of the Green Party of Sweden where she was elected as an executive member of the party's Women's Committee. She was also selected as a candidate for the Greens in the Swedish municipal elections for the city of Kramfors in 2002.

== Personal life ==
She used to be married to Columbia University professor, Hamid Dabashi, with whom she has two children. She is an atheist.

=== Brainquake ===
In April 2010, Golbarg Bashi launched Brainquake together with Duke University's Negar Mottahedeh. Brainquake was a criticism of the Boobquake event, which Bashi argued was an unhelpful and inappropriate way of drawing attention to legitimate issues. The issue at hand was a statement by Tehran's leader in Friday Prayer, saying that women who wear immodest clothing and behave promiscuously cause earthquakes. Bashi and Brainquake advocates argued that instead of highlighting one's physical differences, women should show off their CVs and lists of accomplishments.

=== Publications ===
==== Books ====
- P is for Palestine (2017) (with Golrokh Nafisi)
- Counting Up the Olive Tree (2024) (with Nabi H Ali)

==== Other publications ====
Among other topics, Bashi has published works about the situation of women in Iran.

- March 2006: شاهد عيني تاريخ... (An eyewitness of history...) With Ayatollah Montazeri. Payvand.
- July 2006: A Historic Landmark: Women's Rights Gathering in Tehran on June 12, 2006. NetNative.
- July 2006: The Proper Etiquette of Meeting Shahrnush Parsipur in the United States. Payvand. Also in The Persian Book Review (ISSUE XVI, NO. 48, FALL 2006).
- September 2006: تعديل قانون منح الجنسية في إيران: خطوة في الطريق إلى المساواة بين المرأة والرجل (Citizenship Rights in Iran: One Step Forward, Many More to Take; Staatsbürgerrechte im Iran: Nur ein kleiner Schritt vorwärts). Qantara.
- January 2007: Genre in the Service of Empire: An Iranian Feminist Critique of Diasporic Memoirs. With Niki Akhavan, Mana Kia, and Sima Shakhsari. Znet.
- June 2009: Feminist waves in the Iranian Green Tsunami? With Zillah Eisenstein. PBS.
- June 2009: Iranian Feminism after June 2009. PBS.
- July 2009: Picturing Ourselves: 1953, 1979 and 2009. With Negar Mottahedeh. PBS.
- January 2010: From One Third World Woman to Another. With Gayatri Spivak.

== See also ==
- Postcolonial feminism
- Third-world feminism
- Women's rights movement in Iran
