= Boobquake =

2010 rally protesting claims of female immodesty causing earthquakes

Boobquake was a series of worldwide rallies which took place on April 26, 2010, and served to protest news reports of controversial beliefs blaming women who dress immodestly for causing earthquakes. It was inspired by blogger Jey McCreight.

== Inception ==
The Boobquake rallies served to protest news reports of controversial beliefs espoused by Hujjat al-Islam Kazem Seddiqi, an Islamic religious authority in Iran. Seddiqi blamed women who dress immodestly for causing earthquakes. On April 19, 2010, it was reported that Seddiqi advised his listeners that "Many women who do not dress modestly lead young men astray, corrupt their chastity and spread adultery in society, which increases earthquakes" and Iranians should "adapt their lives to Islam's moral codes" to avoid being "buried under the rubble".

In response to Seddiqi's comments, a blogger named Jey McCreight invited people to dress "in your immodest clothing to represent Boobquake." They described Boobquake as a scientific experiment: "With the power of our scandalous bodies combined, we should surely produce an earthquake. If not, I'm sure Sedighi can come up with a rational explanation for why the ground didn't rumble."

McCreight's idea was popularized by prominent blogs and soon caught the attention of the international media. The event also drew criticism from people seeing it as objectifying women. Following repeated inquiries from the BBC and other news agencies, McCreight planned two meetings for participants: one in West Lafayette, Indiana, and one in Washington, D.C. Soon, what originated as "a humorous exercise in scientific and skeptical thinking" had begun to ignite serious debate regarding the organization of the feminist community.

== Inspiration ==
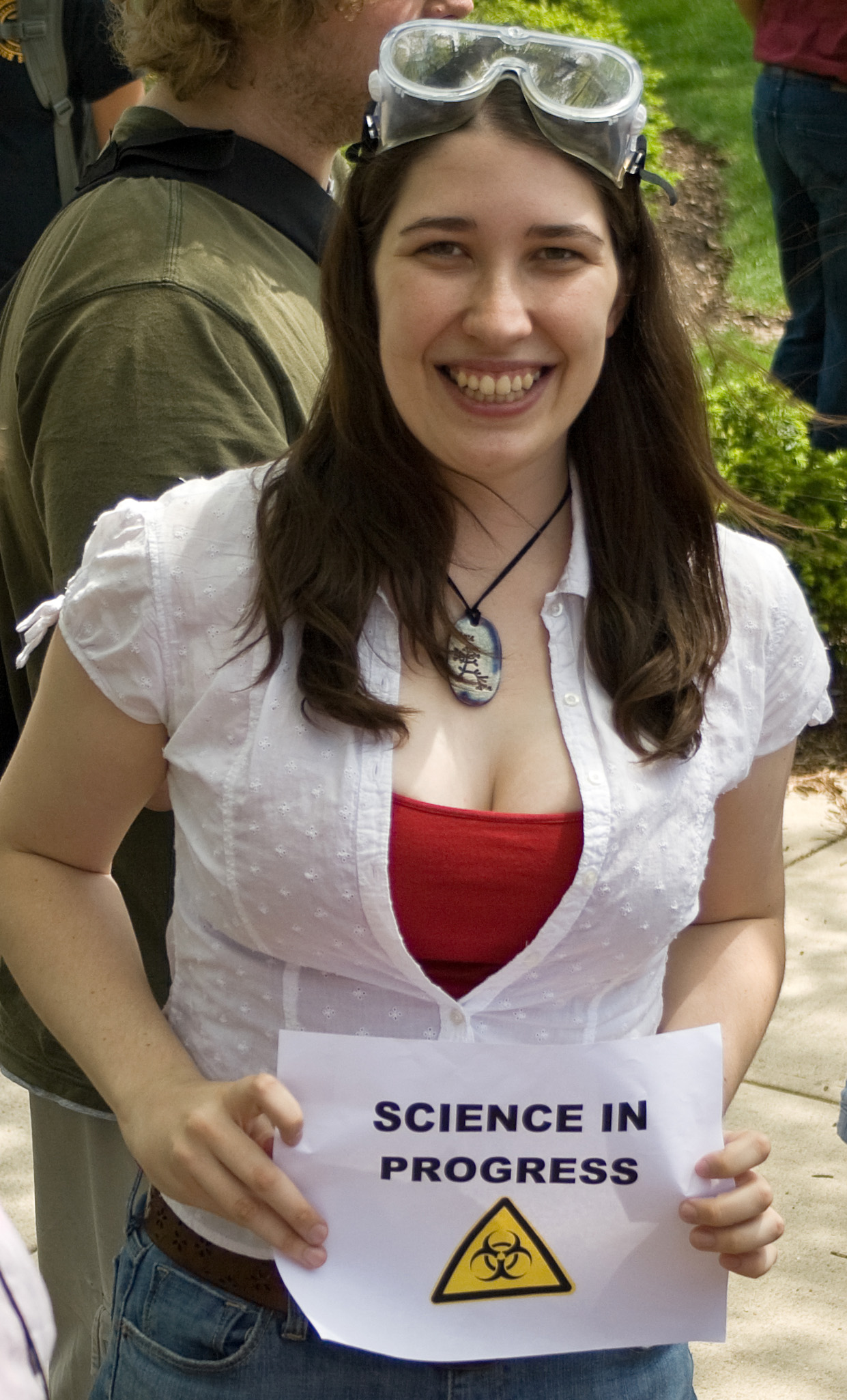
McCreight participating in Boobquake

The inspiration for this event was Jey McCreight, who attributes their activism to reading Richard Dawkins' book The God Delusion and attending a relatively religious college. While working on their undergraduate degree they had co-founded the Society of Non-Theists at Purdue.

One year prior to Boobquake, McCreight had begun keeping a blog in which they described themselves as an atheist and a feminist. On April 19, McCreight announced a protest against Seddiqi's comments on their blog, asking for participants to avoid "hateful or anti-Muslim or anti-Iranian messages". In the week leading up to Boobquake, McCreight received several emails from "thankful skeptics, feminists, and Iranians".

== Event ==
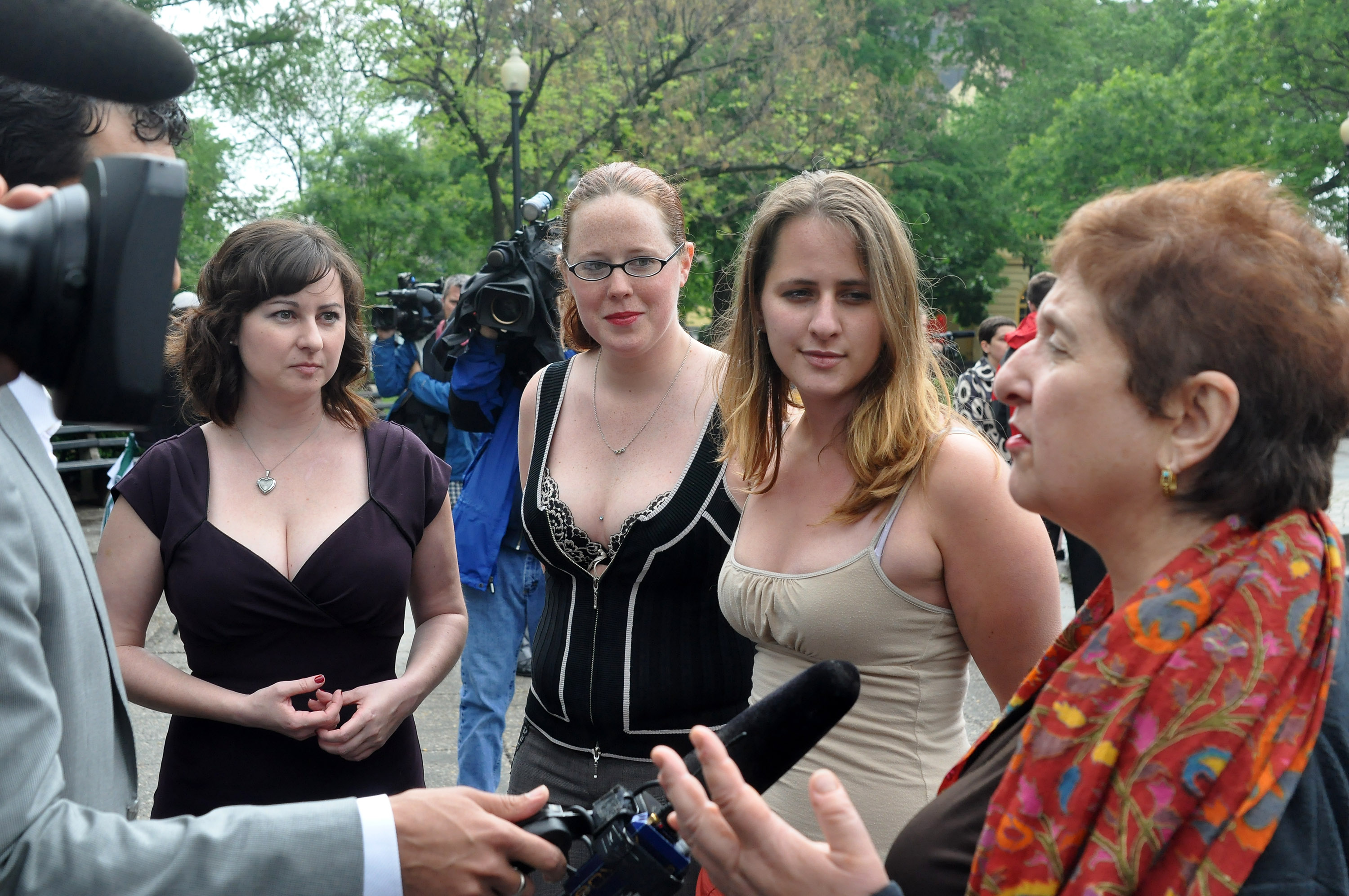
Organizers at the Dupont Circle Boobquake

An estimated total of 200,000 people participated in Boobquake on April 26, 2010. The so-called "epicenter" of Boobquake was a light-hearted two-hour gathering at 1:00 pm at the Purdue Bell Tower in West Lafayette, Indiana. Participants' attire included push-up bras, unbuttoned shirts, short dresses, as well as other "racy costumes" and "risqué clothing". They also held signs with slogans such as "Cleavage for Science", "Amnesty", and "God hates Boobs". Purdue's student newspaper reported that the female participants were outnumbered by male spectators.

Washington, D.C.'s Dupont Circle was the site of another gathering at noon. The Washington gathering was attended by a dozen women and drew the attention of BBC Persia.

Other notable gatherings were reported in New York City and Vancouver. In Vancouver, it was reported that most attendees at the event were hundreds of men using camera phones to take pictures, especially of a small number of women who were topless.

Some people also supported the event by purchasing official "Boobquake 2010" T-shirts through Zazzle.com. The proceeds from the shirts went to the Red Cross, to benefit earthquake recovery; and to the James Randi Educational Foundation, to support critical thinking.

== Evaluation ==
That morning, at 02:59 UTC (April 25, 10:59 pm EDT – 14 hours before Boobquake Indiana; 13 hours before the Washington, DC event), a 6.5-magnitude earthquake struck 195 miles off the coast of Taitung, Taiwan, at a depth of 6.2 miles (10.0 km). Upon hearing of this, McCreight said that it alone was not statistically significant, but that they would continue to monitor seismic activity for the next 24 hours. Other participants mentioned that the earthquake in Taiwan occurred prior to the official start of the experiment.

After April 26 had ended in all time zones, McCreight began to conduct rigorous statistical analysis. McCreight pointed out that dozens of earthquakes occur daily, and that the goal of their analysis was not to see if all seismic activity would cease, but to determine whether the number or severity of earthquakes increased during the experiment. By compiling data from the USGS website, McCreight determined a 95% confidence interval of zero to 148 daily earthquakes. During the course of the Boobquake event, only 47 earthquakes were reported. They also calculated that an earthquake of the magnitude of that in Taiwan had a 37% chance of occurring on that day. McCreight also said that the mean magnitude of seismic activity during the "Boobquake" event was actually slightly below average. As a result of this analysis, McCreight concluded that the immodest clothing worn during Boobquake had no significant effect on earthquake frequency or magnitude. Although McCreight admitted that there were some flaws with the experimental procedure, and that they doubted it would have any impact on Seddiqi's opinions, they believed that the event fulfilled its original intentions of being "a humorous exercise in scientific and skeptical thinking".

== Responses ==
=== Support among expatriate Iranians ===
The event drew a favorable response from several expatriate Iranian political activists, including Mina Ahadi of the International Committee Against Executions and Stoning and Maryam Namazie of Iran Solidarity both of whom are members of the Council of Ex-Muslims of Britain. These activists felt that Boobquake was a significant act in the defense of women's rights and human dignity. They said that many Iranian citizens supported Boobquake in its opposition to Sedighi's views, which they believe to be representative of the Iranian government of the past three decades.

Kazem Sedighi defended his statements in a new sermon on May 14, 2010. When asked why there are not more natural disasters in western nations that do not follow his moral codes, Sedighi answered that God occasionally allows people to continue sinning "so that they (eventually) go to the bottom of Hell." It was not reported whether or not Sedighi specifically mentioned Boobquake during this sermon.

=== Brainquake and objectification of women ===
A feminist critique and response to Boobquake was the brainchild of Golbarg Bashi, a feminist professor of Iranian Studies at Rutgers, who created a counter-movement known as "Brainquake" in April 2010. Bashi and some other feminists were critical of Boobquake's method of drawing attention to questions about gender in Iran which they believed further victimized and objectified women and girls. Bashi, who conceived of the idea, stated that Boobquake was essentially another white liberal "post-feminist" spectacle at the expense of women's struggles in Iran. Negar Mottahedeh, a Duke University professor, managed Brainquake's social media activities in 2010.

Bashi explained the disproportionate interest in Boobquake as opposed to major feminist campaigns in Iran as such: "Our usual boob-crazed, I mean civilized male-dominated mass media went potty over this 'eye-ran' (read as Iran) related campaign, turned it into a major international story and thousands of (mostly) men joined McCreight's 'Boobquake' Facebook event. It was in this context that Brainquake began as an Iranian counter feminist initiative to save the discourse on women's rights from being used as another spectacle and provide visual reference to Iranian women's own century long feminist struggles against sexism."

Planned for the same day as Boobquake, Brainquake was initially a Facebook event registered, composed and managed by Bashi. Brainquake's Facebook event encouraged women to demonstrate their "abilities to push for change" by showing off their résumés, CVs, honors, prizes, and accomplishments. In this way, Bashi and her fellow feminist activists hoped to provide a visual reference to Iranian women's own century long feminist struggles against sexism.

Later in Spring 2010, Brainquake's event page was turned into a fan page and has since become a portal on news and commentary on global women's issues with a particular emphasis on leftist causes. Brainquake has retained its initial goal of providing a comprehensive visual reference to Iranian women's movements and also a pictorial dictionary to many issues and campaigns that identify and fight against all kinds of violence and discrimination against women and girls and other minorities in the United States of America, Europe, and elsewhere. These photo albums and the reliable links and information that accompany them are part of Brainquake's feminist consciousness raising effort for a mass public.

=== Other notable responses ===
Russell Blackford, of the Institute for Ethics and Emerging Technologies, fully supported the idea of Boobquake, saying, "There is nothing wrong with the beauty of the human body, male or female, nothing wrong with enjoying it, and nothing wrong with displaying it to the world." Blackford encouraged participants to "Strut your stuff, and don't let anyone make you feel ashamed about so-called 'immodesty'. Feel free to scorn the moralism of Islamic clerics and anyone else who tries to put you down."

Melody Moezzi, writing for the blog of Ms., saw no reason for any conflict between Boobquake and Brainquake. Moezzi believed that there should be no problem with having multiple means of discrediting "the leaders of the so-called Islamic Republic of Iran", and suggested that women participate in both events.

McCreight themselves subsequently observed that some atheists acted misogynistically towards them and other women, partly in reaction to the joke in Boobquake's name, and they have called for a greater respect for feminism and a more welcoming culture in the atheism movement.

== See also ==
- Women in Islam
