= Mottahedeh =

Mottahedeh is a surname. Notable people with the surname include:

- Mildred Mottahedeh (1908 – 2000), American businesswoman and porcelain collector
- Roy Mottahedeh (born 1940), American historian
- Iraj Mottahedeh (born 1942), retired Anglican bishop
- Negar Mottahedeh, cultural critic and film theorist
