= Mohammad Montazeri =

Iranian cleric (1944–1981)

- محمد منتظری
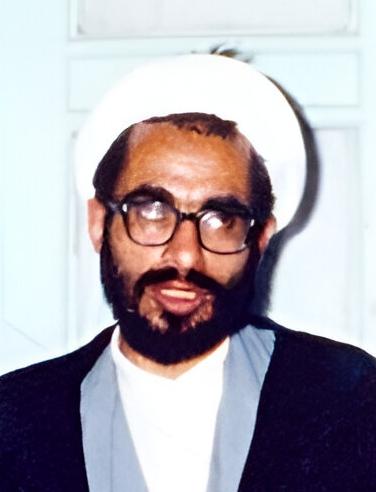
- Montazeri in 1980

Personal life
- Born: Abbas Mohammad Montazeri c. 1944 Najafabad, Iran
- Died: 28 June 1981 (aged 36–37) Tehran, Iran
- Cause of death: Bombing
- Resting place: Fatima Masumeh Shrine
- Parents: Hossein Ali Montazeri (father); Mah Sultan Rabbani (mother)

Religious life
- Religion: Shia Islam
- Profession: Cleric

Senior posting
- Period in office: 1960s–1981

Mohammad Abbas Montazeri (Persian: محمد منتظری; c. 1944 – 28 June 1981) was an Iranian cleric and military figure who is the eldest son of former Iranian deputy supreme leader Hussein-Ali Montazeri. He was one of the founding members and early chiefs of the Islamic Revolutionary Guard Corps. Montazeri was assassinated in a bombing in Tehran on 28 June 1981.

== Early life and education ==
Born in Najafabad in 1944, Montazeri was the oldest son of Grand Ayatollah Hossein Ali Montazeri. He had two brothers and two sisters.

In 1963, Montazeri attended religious seminars in Qom together with his long-term confidant, Mehdi Hashemi, and Mehdi's brother, Hadi Hashemi, who would be the future husband of Montazeri's sister.

== Career and activities ==
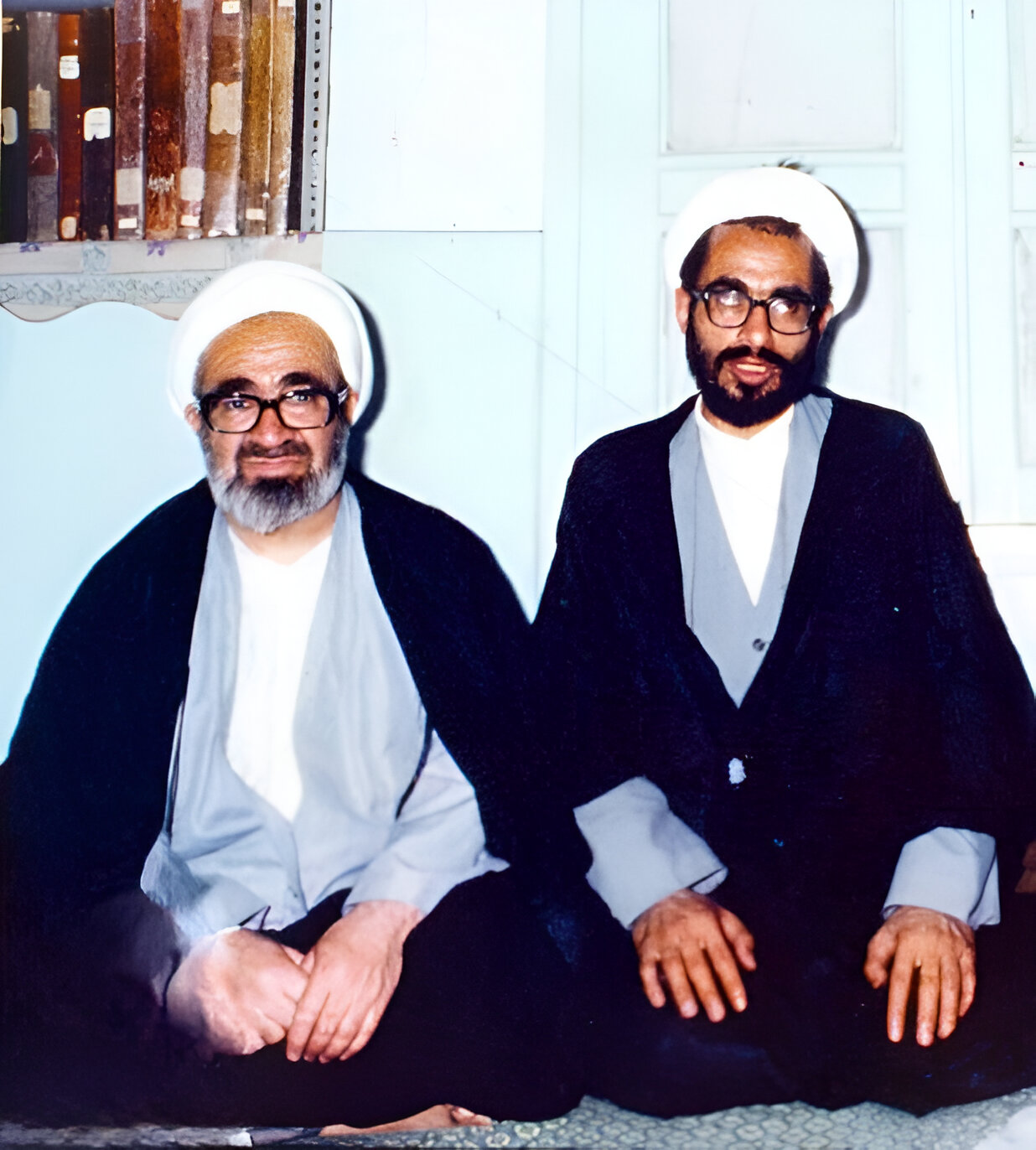
Mohammad (right) with his father Hussein-Ali Montazeri in 1980

Montazeri was a low-ranking and radical cleric. He began opposition activities against Mohammad Reza Pahlavi after the June 1963 events that led to the exile of Khomeini. His father and he were both arrested by the Shah's security forces in March 1966. In prison Mohammad was tortured and released in 1968. He left Iran for Pakistan, and then he settled in Najaf, Iraq, in 1971, and stayed there until 1975. Next he lived in Afghanistan and in other cities of Iraq.

Montazeri headed the People's Revolutionary Organization of the Islamic Republic of Iran, an armed group that was based in Syria and Lebanon and fought against Israeli forces. Founded by Montazeri and Ali Akbar Mohtashamipur, the group aimed to assist liberation movements in Muslim countries. Trained in the Fatah camps in Lebanon, Montazeri fought with the Palestine Liberation Organization (PLO) and other Palestinian and Shi'ite armed groups in the country, and was called Abu Ahmad. He was one of the three Iranian key officials along with Mostafa Chamran and Mohtashamipur who strengthened Iran's commitment to Lebanon. Montazeri, Mohtashamipur, and Jalal al-Din Farsi suggested that Iranian army should be sent to southern Lebanon to fight the Israeli army which had been invading the region. Their proposal was not endorsed by the Amal Movement which considered it as an interference in Lebanon's internal affairs. Montazeri also travelled to Europe during this period.

In the mid-1970s Montazeri formed his base in Syria and continued his close relations with the PLO and the Libyan ruler Muammar Gaddafi’s secret service. In 1978 he occupied the Mehrabad Airport of Tehran with his 200 armed followers and demanded to go to Libya to search for Musa Al Sadr, a Lebanese Shia cleric who disappeared in Libya in August 1978. He visited Ayatollah Khomeini when the latter was in exile in Paris. Before the 1979 Iranian revolution Montazeri was one of the people who promoted the idea of the establishment of the Islamic Revolutionary Guards.

During the revolutionary process, Montazeri was called "Ayatollah Ringo" and "Red Sheikh". In order to export Islamic revolution to other countries he and Mehdi Hashemi founded one of the earliest groups, the SATJA, in the spring of 1979. In December 1979 he organized a campaign to support and join the Palestinian militants, fighting in the Lebanese civil war. His activities in the SATJA caused conflicts with the government, and he was forced to disband it.

Then Montazeri and Hashemi joined the Guards. Montazeri headed a faction of the Guards in Tehran that functioned as a strong arm of the Supreme Leader Khomeini. It was called Freedom Movements Unit. In 1981 this faction was transformed into the office of liberation movements (OLM) which was first led by him and after his death, by Hashemi. An account with the name liberation movements was opened in the Melli Bank to get financial support from Iranians. The OLM put into practice the Iranian support for the Shi‘a movements in Iraq and the Gulf as well as those in Saudi Arabia, Lebanon and Afghanistan.

At the founding and institutionalization phase of the Guards Montazeri became a member of the Revolutionary Guards Leadership Council in 1979 which was formed by the Revolutionary Council to oversee the future tasks of the Guard. He publicly declared in 1980 that the IRGC personnel "were awaiting deployment from Damascus."

Montazeri joined and led the Muslim People's Republic Party and became a member of the first Majlis in March 1980. On the other hand, his party was disbanded after its members were either arrested or executed. In addition, Montazeri served at the supreme defense council and was the prayer leader in Tehran until his death.

=== Views ===
Montazeri was one of the most radical followers of Ayatollah Khomeini. Before the Iranian revolution he was close ally of Muammar Gaddafi and advocated strong ties with Libya. And, he did not support the approach of the Amal movement and Musa Al Sadr due to their being non-revolutionary. Montazeri was also a fierce critic of the interim government led by Mahdi Bazargan due to the same reason.

Both Montazeri and his father actively encouraged the rebellion of Shia Muslims against the governments in the Muslim countries and also, strongly argued for the export of the Islamic regime to other countries, often called "Islamic Internationale". The latter goal was mostly achieved through the OLM, and it is one of two pillars of ideology guided the revolution along with the propagation of Islam. In addition, he argued that all Muslims could enter Islamic states without passport or visas.

Montazeri supported the development of links with Shia Muslims in Lebanon. He tried to make Iran a key player in the Palestinian-Israeli conflict. Just three days before his death, he argued for the execution of the followers of the ousted President Abolhassan Banisadr.

=== Controversy ===
At the initial phase of the Iranian revolution the activities of the Montazeri's group, SATJA, led to tensions between Montazeri and both the Guards's leadership and the provisional government. His father, Ayatollah Hossein Ali Montazeri, publicly reprimanded him and stated that Mohammad had poor mental health because he had been tortured by the former Shah's secret police. Eventually, elder Montazeri disassociated himself from his son’s activities.

Mohammad Montazeri was part of the Libya-friendly group in the court of Khomeini, and there was a feud between his group and the faction, called "Syrian mafia", led by Sadegh Ghotbzadeh. Ghotbzadeh's faction was called previously the Liberation Movement of Iran, and Mostafa Chamran was also part of it. In addition, Montazeri had serious disagreements with Ayatollah Mohammad Beheshti, cofounder of the Islamic Republican Party.

== Death and aftermath ==
Montazeri was killed in a bombing at the central headquarters of the then ruling party, Islamic Republican Party, in Tehran on 28 June 1981. The Islamic Republic of Iran suspected various organizations and individuals, including SAVAK, the Iraqi regime, the People's Mujahedin of Iran, the United States, royalist army officers, and "internal mercenaries". The death toll in the attack was 73, including Beheshti, cabinet ministers and the members of the Majlis. A state funeral was held for the victims on 30 June and a week of mourning was proclaimed. Montazeri was buried in the Fatima Masumeh Shrine in Qom where his father would also be buried on 21 December 2009.

Four Iraqi agents and Mehdi Tafari were executed for the incident.

Following the assassination of Montazeri Iran's support for the dissident groups in Saudi Arabia intensified. Iran also initiated its financial support for the protests in Saudi Arabia during the hajj periods in the 1980s.

== Legacy ==
A street in Qom was named after Montazeri, Martyr Mohammad Montazeri Boulevard. Rashed Jafaripour Kaveri published a book on Montazeri in Persian in 2013.
