= People's Revolutionary Organization of the Islamic Republic of Iran =

- Abbreviation: SATJA
- Founder: Mohammad Montazeri
- Founded: 1979; 47 years ago
- Dissolved: early 1980s
- Headquarters: Tehran, Iran
- Newspaper: Omid-e Iran
- Ideology: Anti-imperialism; Anti-Zionism

People's Revolutionary Organization of the Islamic Republic of Iran
- Dates active: 1979–early 1980s
- Size: 40–50 (1979)
- Wars: Palestinian insurgency in South Lebanon

People's Revolutionary Organization of the Islamic Republic of Iran (Persian: سازمان انقلابی توده‌های جمهوری اسلامی ایران, romanized: Sāzmān-e Enqelābī-e Tūde'hā-ye Jomhūrī-e Eslāmī-ye Irān) was an armed political party in Iran.

Mohammad Montazeri, son of Ayatollah Montazeri, was in charge of SATJA but after his death in 1981, Mehdi Hashemi took over the group. The major activity of the SATJA and its magazine was to promote Muammar Gaddafi and insult Mostafa Chamran, Musa al-Sadr and Amal Movement.

As of Ronen A. Cohen, the SATJA's brief presence left a long trail that is even expressed in the current sensitive political-religious situation in Lebanon.

== Origins ==
The idea to create the SATJA was first formed before Iranian Revolution. The SATJA and the Forqan group had the same ideological nurturing, but each chose to emphasize different things. Ali Shariati's writings were used as an ideological platform by both the Forqan and the SATJA. The latter took Shariati's books — Shahadat and Pas az Shahadat — as an excuse to export the revolution, but never dealt with the other ideological insights of Shariati's agenda and only chose to use the one that served their aspiration to export the revolution.

== Headquarters ==
The SATJA was first established in a house in Takht-e Jamshīd Street in Tehran. Also, It is claimed that the SATJA's center was located in the building of The Ministry of Immigration Office on Shahrārā Street.

== Activities ==
Montazeri sent many of the SATJA members to Lebanon and Syria to fight Israel. He went to the Mehrabad Airport with his armed forces — whom were mostly young boys and girls — and volunteered to fight alongside the Palestinian guerrillas against Israel, after which he boarded the plane and went to fight Israel. Montazeri also had a close relationship with the tribal parties and leftists in Lebanon and SATJA published the magazine of Omīd-e Irān (Hope for Iran in Persian) as part of this activity.

Ali Akbar Mohtashamipur then-Ambassador of Iran to Syria was among of the SATJA's members.

== Sources ==
- Cohen, Ronen A. (2015). Revolution Under Attack: The Forqan Group of Iran. Palgrave Macmillan. ISBN 978-1-137-50250-6.
- Selitkar, Ofira; Rezaei, Farhad (2019). Iran, Revolution, and Proxy Wars. Middle East Today. Palgrave Macmillan. ISBN 978-3-030-29418-2.
