= 1985 Iranian deputy supreme leader election =

- 15 July 1985

86 members of the Assembly of Experts Unknown votes needed to win
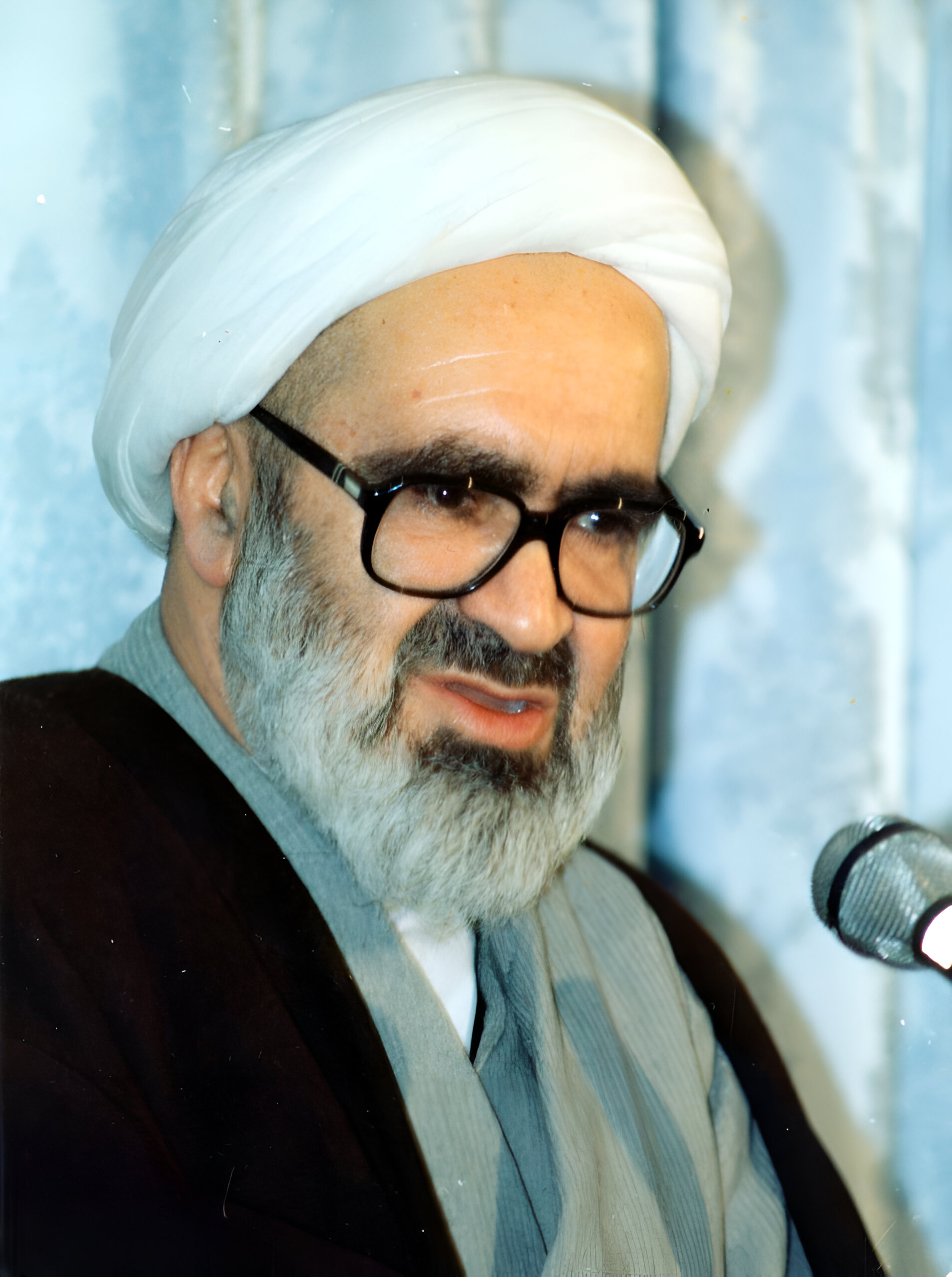
Nominee	Hussein-Ali Montazeri
Party	Islamic Republican Party and Society of Seminary Teachers of Qom
Electoral vote	Elected
Deputy Supreme Leader before election
Office established
Elected Deputy Supreme Leader
Hussein-Ali Montazeri
Islamic Republican Party

An election for the deputy supreme leader of Iran was held on 15 July 1985, following the circumstances of the Iran–Iraq War and the worsening physical condition of the supreme leader Ruhollah Khomeini. On the same day, Hussein-Ali Montazeri was announced as the deputy supreme leader after his victory in the election as he was the sole nominee in the election.

== Background ==
Montazeri initially rejected Khomeini's proposal to make him his successor, insisting that the choice of successor be left to the Assembly of Experts, which happened.

== Aftermath ==
While already elected the eventual choice was firstly revealed in November 1985. It was revealed to everyone by Hadi Barikbin during Friday prayers.

== See also ==
- Deputy Supreme Leader of Iran
- Supreme Leader of Iran
- 1989 Iranian supreme leader election
- 2026 Iranian supreme leader election
- Interim Leadership Council
