= Mehdi Hashemi =

Iranian cleric and military officier

- Hashemi in 1977
- Born: 1944; Qahderijan, Iran
- Died: September 28, 1987 (aged 42–43); Tehran, Iran
- Military career
- Allegiance: Iran
- Branch: Islamic Revolutionary Guard Corps
- Service years: 1979–1987
- Commands: Liberation Movements Unit
- Conflicts: 1982 Lebanon War; Soviet–Afghan War

Mehdi Hashemi (1944 – 28 September 1987) was an Iranian Shia cleric who after the 1979 Iranian Revolution became a senior official in the Islamic Revolutionary Guards. He was defrocked by the Special Clerical Court and executed by the Islamic Republic in 1987. Officially he was guilty of sedition, murder, and related charges, but others suspect his true crime was opposition to the regime's secret dealings with the United States within the Iran–Contra affair.

== Background ==
Hashemi was born in Qahderijan, near Isfahan, in 1944 to a well-established clerical family. Hashemi was the brother of Hadi Hashemi, Ayatollah Montazeri's son-in-law. In addition, he was a close confidant of Ayatollah Montazeri's son, Mohammad.

Hashemi first became known to the Iranian public during the closing days of the Pahlavi dynasty in 1977 when SAVAK arrested him for the vigilante murder of "prostitutes, homosexuals, and drug traffickers". He was also accused of murdering a conservative cleric who had publicly insulted cleric Khomeini, the Grand Ayatollah. During this time he was supported by opponents of Shah Mohammad Reza Pahlavi as an innocent victim framed by SAVAK, in an attempt "to tarnish the reputation of the clerical establishment."

Upon his release from prison by the successor security agency SAVAMA, following the 1979 Iranian Revolution, Hashemi was celebrated as a "religious hero." He remained associated with Ayatollah Montazeri, and after the Ayatollah's son and his friend, Mohammad, died in the bombing of the Islamic Republican Party headquarters in 1981, Mehdi Hashemi took control of Montazeri's armed followers. He followed Montazeri's visions on the interpretation and implementation of the Islamic revolution during a time of contradictory and increasingly fractious understandings within the ruling elite which sought to circumscribe Montazeri's influence in Lebanon and tighten the Iranian government's grip on its Lebanese Shi'a clients. This led to factional conflicts, as different Iranian factions promoted Hezbollah or Amal, another Shi'a group associated with the Lebanese government.

According to several sources, Hashemi came to head the liberation movements unit in the Islamic Revolutionary Guards, dealing with other minority Shi'a communities including Lebanon's Hezbollah, then fighting the Israeli invasion, and Afghan mujahideen units, then fighting the Soviet–Afghan War. Some sources say Hashemi ran an organization out of Montazeri's office which sought to export the Islamic revolution to other Shi'a areas; other sources say he was in charge of the "Bureau of Assistance to the Islamic Movements in the World", which was tasked with spreading the Islamic Revolution throughout the Middle East.

== Opposition to arms dealing with the US ==
Hashemi opposed the Iranian government's efforts to obtain scarce weapons and spares for the Iran–Iraq War from the United States and Israel, and provide assistance to the Reagan Administration in releasing US citizens held hostage by Hezbollah in Lebanon. He leaked news of the dealings to the Lebanese news magazine Ash-Shiraa. The appearance of the story in the magazine's 3 November 1986 issue triggered a scandal in both Iran and the United States, as American government policy forbade selling weapons to Iran, and in Iran, America was condemned as "the Great Satan" and Israel as the "Little Satan". The dealings were known in the Western world initially as the "Irangate" "arms for hostages" scandal, or with the later diversion of funds, as the Iran-Contra Affair.

== Arrest ==
After Hashemi's followers kidnapped a Syrian official in Tehran in October 1986, and shortly before the public exposure of the Irangate scandal, the Iranian government announced Hashemi had been arrested for treason along with 40 associates including his brother Hadi Hashemi. He was stripped of his Hujjat al-Islam title. His prosecution was handled by the Mohammad Reyshahri, the former judge of the military tribunals who had recently been appointed minister of intelligence. According to Reysharhri's Political Memoirs, Hashemi had powerful patrons, and after a month-long investigation, all the interrogators "had obtained was a taped interview in which the wise guy [Mehdi Hashemi] had cleverly planted deviant ideas."

However many more months of "thorough" interrogation of Hashemi including the application of 75 lashes for lying, and confrontation with "damaging confessions" from his 40 accomplices including his brother, produced more. After eight months and three different taped interviews Hashemi produced a taped confession aired on national television and headlined in newspapers as "I am Manifest Proof of Deviation." In it he confessed to "storing weapons, forging documents, criticizing the government, and sowing dissension among seminary students" and the revolutionary guards. Answering his own question of why he had done these things he explained that "carnal instincts" (nafsaniyat) had enticed him into "illicit relations" (ravabat) with SAVAK and Satan. In regards to his work in Montazeri's bureau of assistance to the Islamic movements, in the world he said:

I now realize that despicable sinners like myself had no business inside the heir-designate's office. I thank God that I have been removed from that office.

and pleaded with those who shared his "deviant ideas to return to the correct path..."

Khomeini revived the Special Clerical Court in 1987, particularly to try Hashemi. In August 1987, after the confession was made public, Hashemi was tried by a Special Clerical Court on charges of "sowing corruption on earth, inciting fitna, succumbing to Satan, and desecrating the martyrs of the Islamic Revolution." Specifically, according to Reyshahri, that meant raiding and abetting the Mojahedin having an ongoing relationship with SAVAK, smuggling opium from Afghanistan and eliminating one of Montazeri's rivals by "inducing the spread of cancer through his body." At the same time, Reyshahri took the opportunity to deny the "insidious notion" that Hashemi was being punished because of his opposition to the McFarlane visit: "Those spreading this false rumor are helping the Black House [the White House]."

Evidence that Hashemi was tortured to confess comes from an unsympathetic source. An anonymous Iranian author of a prison memoir described how all political prisoners in Iran at that time were under intense pressure to denounce their former political beliefs and comrades and as a result, they often "carefully scrutinized" the numerous video confessions of other prisoners prison officials played for the prisoners "to figure out which speakers had capitulated without much resistance and which had resisted to their utmost." Though mortal ideological enemies of Hashemi, when the author and her fellow leftists saw Hashemi on video, they "spontaneously said to themselves, 'He must have suffered unbearable tortures.'"

== Execution ==
Hashemi was executed in Tehran in September 1987 before his verdict was announced. This was reportedly done to preclude the intervention on Hashemi's behalf by Montazeri, according to prosecutor Reyshahri. The execution was a blow to Ayatollah Montazeri, who had pleaded with Ayatollah Khomeini on Hashemi's behalf saying he had "known him inside out since our childhood. He is a devout Muslim, a militant revolutionary, and a great admirer of the Imam." On another note, one of Hashemi's few dozen co-defendants, Omid Najafabadi, who was a Revolutionary Court judge and the religious jurisprudent, or Hakem-e-Shaar, of Esfahan, was also executed; the others were all pardoned or given light sentences.
