= Hamid Dabashi =

American academic (born 1951)

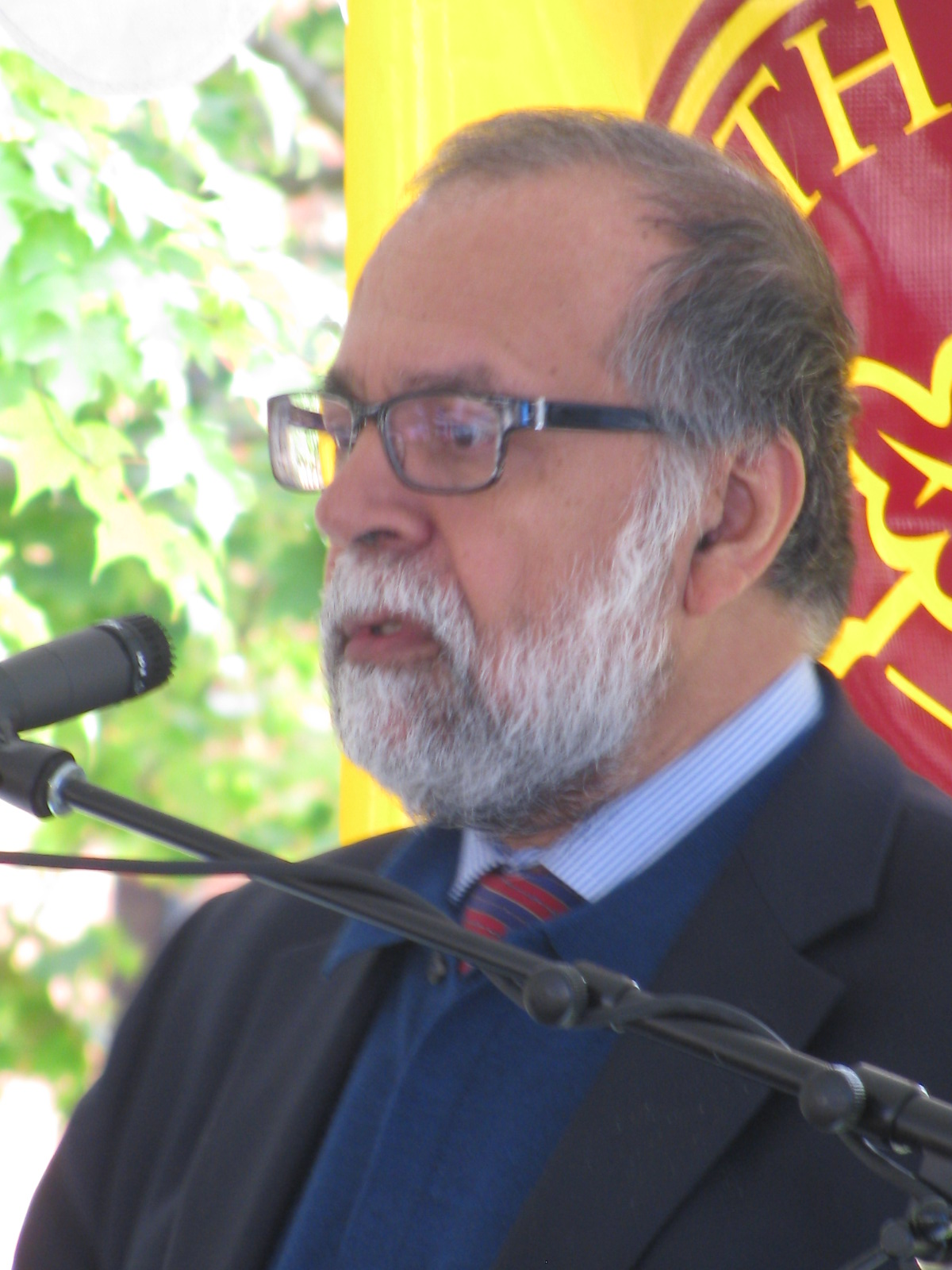
- Dabashi at "Fall for the Book" festival, 2013
- Born: June 15, 1951 (age 75); Ahvaz, Pahlavi Iran
- Spouse: Golbarg Bashi (ex-wife)

Education
- Education: University of Tehran; University of Pennsylvania
- Doctoral advisor: Philip Rieff

Philosophical work
- Era: 20th / 21st-century philosophy
- Region: Western philosophy
- School: Postcolonialism, critical theory
- Institutions: Columbia University
- Main interests: Liberation theology, literary theory, aesthetics, cultural theory, sociology of culture
- Notable ideas: Trans-Aesthetics, Radical Hermeneutics, Anti-colonial Modernity, Will to Resist Power, Dialectics of National Traumas and National Art Forms, Phantom Liberties

Hamid Dabashi (Note: Persian pronunciation: [hæmíːd̪̥ d̪æbɒ́ːʃíː].) (Persian: حمید دباشی, pronounced [hæmíːd̪̥ d̪æbɒ́ːʃíː]; born 1951) is an Iranian-American academic who holds the Hagop Kevorkian Professorship of Iranian studies and Comparative literature at Columbia University in New York City. Since 2020, he has served as Director of Undergraduate Studies in Columbia's Department of Middle Eastern, South Asian, and African Studies (MESAAS).

He is the author of over twenty books. Among them are Theology of Discontent, several books on Iranian cinema, Staging a Revolution, the edited volume Dreams of a Nation: On Palestinian Cinema, and his one-volume analysis of Iranian history, Iran: A People Interrupted.

== Biography ==
Born and raised in the southern city of Ahvaz in Iran, Dabashi was educated in Iran and then in the United States, where he received a dual Ph.D. in sociology of culture and Islamic studies from the University of Pennsylvania in 1984, followed by a postdoctoral fellowship at Harvard University. He wrote his dissertation on Max Weber's theory of charismatic authority with Freudian cultural critic Philip Rieff.

== Major works ==
Hamid Dabashi's books are Iran: A People Interrupted, which traces the last two hundred years of Iran's history including analysis of cultural trends, and political developments, up to the collapse of the reform movement and the emergence of the presidency of Mahmoud Ahmadinejad. Dabashi argues that "Iran needs to be understood as the site of an ongoing contest between two contrasting visions of modernity, one colonial, the other anticolonial".

His book Theology of Discontent is a study of the global rise of Islamism as a form of liberation theology. His other book Close Up: Iranian Cinema, Past, Present, Future (2001) is a text on modern Iranian cinema and the phenomenon of (Iranian) national cinema as a form of cultural modernity and featured in the Lonely Planet travel guide for Iran. In his essay "For the Last Time: Civilizations", he has also posited the binary opposition between "Islam and the West" as a major narrative strategy of raising a fictive centre for European modernity and lowering the rest of the world as peripheral to that centre.

In Truth and Narrative, he has deconstructed the essentialist conception of Islam projected by Orientalists and Islamists alike. Instead he has posited, in what he calls a "polyfocal" conception of Islam, three competing discourses and institutions of authority – which he terms "nomocentric" (law-based), "logocentric" (reason-based) and "homocentric" (human-based) – vying for power and competing for legitimacy. The historical dynamics among these three readings of "Islam", he concludes, constitutes the moral, political and intellectual history of Muslims.

Among his other work are his essays Artist without Borders (2005), Women without Headache (2005), For the Last Time Civilization (2001) and "The End of Islamic Ideology" (2000).

Hamid Dabashi is also the author of numerous articles and public speeches, ranging in their subject matters from Islamism, feminism, globalised empire and ideologies and strategies of resistance, to visual and performing arts in a global context.

Among his books published after 2010 are:

- Shi'ism: A Religion of Protest (Harvard University Press, 2011), which won the Marginal Revolution Book of the Year award;
- The World of Persian Literary Humanism (Harvard University Press, 2012);
- Can Non-Europeans Think? (Zed Books, 2015);
- Persophilia: Persian Culture on the Global Scene (Harvard University Press, 2015);
- Iran without Borders: Towards a Critique of the Postcolonial Nation (Verso, 2016);
- The Shahnameh: The Persian Epic as World Literature (Columbia University Press, 2019);
- On Edward Said: Remembrance of Things Past (Haymarket Books, 2020);
- The Last Muslim Intellectual: The Life and Legacy of Jalal Al-e Ahmad (Edinburgh University Press, 2021);
- The End of Two Illusions: Islam after the West (University of California Press, 2022);
- An Iranian Childhood: Rethinking History and Memory (2023).

== Film and art ==
Dabashi was consulted by Ridley Scott for Kingdom of Heaven (2005). Scott claimed his film was approved and verified by Dabashi: "I showed the film to one very important Muslim in New York, a lecturer from Columbia, and he said it was the best portrayal of Saladin he's ever seen". Dabashi praised the film for "linking historical events with contemporary issues" and called it a "work of art by a major filmmaker."

Dabashi was the chief consultant to Hany Abu-Assad's Paradise Now (2005) and Shirin Neshat's Women Without Men (2009). Dabashi appears in Bavand Karim's Nation of Exiles (2010), providing analysis of the Iranian Green Movement.

Dabashi has also served as jury member on many international art and film festivals, most recently the Locarno International Festival in Switzerland. In the context of his commitment to advancing trans-national art and independent world cinema, he is the founder of Dreams of a Nation, a Palestinian Film Project, dedicated to preserving and safeguarding Palestinian Cinema. For his contributions to Iranian cinema, Mohsen Makhmalbaf, the Iranian film-maker called Dabashi "a rare cultural critic".

== Views and controversies ==
Dabashi has been a commentator on a number of political issues, often regarding the Middle East, Columbia University, American foreign policy, or a combination of those.

=== Columbia Unbecoming controversy ===
Dabashi was one of the three professors named in the David Project’s short film Columbia Unbecoming, which included accusations of antisemitism against the professors. According to the New York Times, Dabashi was mentioned principally because of his published political viewpoints, and that he had canceled a class to attend a Palestinian rally. The New York chapter of the American Civil Liberties Union sided with the professors. An ad hoc committee formed by Lee C. Bollinger, Columbia University's president, reported in March 2005 that they could not find any credible allegations of antisemitism, but did criticize the university's grievance procedures, and recommended changes.

=== Israel and Palestine ===
In 2002, Dabashi sharply criticized Rabbi Charles Sheer (who was the university's Jewish chaplain between 1969 and 2004) after he admonished several professors for cancelling their classes to attend pro-Palestinian rallies. Dabashi wrote in the Columbia Spectator that Rabbi Sheer "has taken upon himself the task of mobilizing and spearheading a crusade of fear and intimidation against members of the Columbia faculty and students who have dared to speak against the slaughter of innocent Palestinians."

Dabashi has described the state of Israel as "a dyslexic Biblical exegesis," "occupied Palestine," "a vicarious avocation," "a dangerous delusion," "a colonial settlement," "a Jewish apartheid state," and "a racist apartheid state". In an interview with AsiaSource in June 2003, Dabashi stated that supporters of Israel "cannot see that Israel over the past 50 years as a colonial state - first with white European colonial settlers, then white American colonial settlers, now white Russian colonial settlers—amounts to nothing more than a military base for the rising predatory empire of the United States. Israel has no privilege greater or less than Pakistan or Kuwait or Saudi Arabia. These are all military bases but some of them, like Israel, are like the hardware of the American imperial imagination."

In an interview with the Electronic Intifada in September 2002, Dabashi referred to the pro-Israel lobby as "Gestapo apparatchiks" and that "The so-called "pro-Israeli lobby" is an integral component of the imperial designs of the Bush administration for savage and predatory globalization." He also criticized "fanatic zealots from Brooklyn" who have settled on Palestinian lands. Dabashi has also harshly criticized the New York Times for what he describes as a bias towards Israel, stating that the paper is "the single most nauseating propaganda paper on planet."

In September 2004, Dabashi sharply criticized Israel in the Egyptian newspaper Al-Ahram, writing that:

What they call "Israel" is no mere military state. A subsumed militarism, a systemic mendacity with an ingrained violence constitutional to the very fusion of its fabric, has penetrated the deepest corners of what these people have to call their "soul." What the Israelis are doing to Palestinians has a mirror reflection on their own soul - sullied, vacated, exiled, now occupied by a military machinery no longer plugged to any electrical outlet. It is not just the Palestinian land that they have occupied; their own soul is an occupied territory, occupied by a mechanical force geared on self-destruction. They are on automatic piloting. This is they. No one is controlling anything. Half a century of systematic maiming and murdering of another people has left its deep marks on the faces of these people, the way they talk, the way they walk, the way they handle objects, the way they greet each other, the way they look at the world. There is an endemic prevarication to this machinery, a vulgarity of character that is bone-deep and structural to the skeletal vertebrae of its culture.

Responding to Dabashi's Al-Ahram essay, Columbia University President Lee Bollinger said, "I want to completely disassociate myself from those ideas. They're outrageous things to say, in my view." Jonathan Rosenblum, director of Jewish Media Resources, later also criticized Dabashi's column. In The Bulletin, Herb Denenberg wrote that Dabashi's article "is not borderline racism. It's as gross and obvious as racism can get." Writing in The Nation, Scott Sherman wrote that Dabashi's article was "troubling" because of its "sweeping characterization of an entire people-"Israeli Jews" or not—as vulgar and domineering in their very essence. The passage can easily be construed as anti-Semitic. Dabashi, at a minimum, is guilty of shrill and careless writing."

In a letter to the Columbia Spectator, Dabashi wrote that the above passage was "not a racial characterization of a people, but a critical reflection on the body politics of state militarism" and the effects that it has on human beings. Dabashi also apologized for "any hurt that I may have inadvertently caused" due to the interpretation of the passage. In a sworn statement submitted to the US Commission on Civil Rights, Dabashi stated that he has not expressed, nor ever harbored, any antisemitic sentiments and that the 2004 Al-Ahram essay was being misconstrued.

He subsequently criticized pro-Israel groups in the United States again, writing in Palestine Chronicle in 2009 that the "pro-Israeli Zionist lobby in the US banked and invested heavily in infiltrating, buying, and paying for all the major and minor corridors of power." In the same article, Dabashi endorsed cultural and academic boycotts of Israel. In that article, Dabashi advocated for boycott efforts targeting both individuals and institutions:

The divestment campaign that has been far more successful in Western Europe needs to be reinvigorated in North America – as must the boycotting of the Israeli cultural and academic institutions. It is not just the worst of the Israelis who (according to a recent poll by Haaretz) condone and actively support the slaughter of Palestinians in Gaza, but so have their very best, their intellectuals, professors, journalists, filmmakers, novelists and poets, from Amos Oz to David Grossman to A. B. Yehoshua to Meir Shalev and scores of others. Naming names and denouncing individually every prominent Israeli intellectual who has publicly endorsed their elected officials' wide-eyed barbarism, and then categorically boycotting their universities and colleges, film festivals and cultural institutions, is the single most important act of solidarity that their counterparts can do around the world.

On May 8, 2018, Dabashi tweeted, "Every dirty treacherous ugly and pernicious act happening in the world just wait for a few days and the ugly name of 'Israel' will pup...".(Twitter link (404), Archive link) Rena Nasar, a StandWithUs campus director, told the student-run news website Campus Reform that "blaming the Jewish state for every problem in the world is virulent anti-Semitism, echoing rhetoric that has led to oppression and violence against Jews for centuries."

Dabashi is on the advisory board of the U.S. Campaign for the Academic & Cultural Boycott of Israel (see Palestinian Campaign for the Academic and Cultural Boycott of Israel).

In 2025, Dabashi wrote an opinion piece in the Middle East Eye, arguing that Israel has conducted an "incremental Palestinian genocide" over the past century and that Gaza genocide denial should be considered a criminal offence worldwide.

=== Criticism of Lee Bollinger ===
Following Columbia University President Lee Bollinger's statements on Iranian President Mahmoud Ahmadinejad during Ahmadinejad's visit to Columbia in September 2007 (in which Bollinger stated that the Iranian President was a "petty and cruel dictator" who lacked the "intellectual courage" to offer real answers on denying the Holocaust) Dabashi wrote that Bollinger's statements were "the most ridiculous clichés of the neocon propaganda machinery, wrapped in the missionary position of a white racist supremacist carrying the heavy burden of civilizing the world." Dabashi further stated that Bollinger's comments were "propaganda warfare ... waged by the self-proclaimed moral authority of the United States" and that "Only Lee Bollinger's mind-numbing racism when introducing Ahmadinejad could have made the demagogue look like the innocent bystander in a self-promotional circus." In addition, Dabashi wrote that when Bollinger made these comments, "Nothing short of the devil incarnate, the Christian Fundamentalist in Bollinger thought, was sitting in front of him" and that Bollinger's "shamelessly racist" comments were "replete with racism."

Judith Jacobson, a professor of epidemiology at Columbia and co-coordinator of the Israel advocacy group Scholars for Peace in the Middle East, criticized Dabashi for his remarks, stating that Dabashi's article was "sheer demagoguery" and that "attributing President Bollinger's remarks or behavior to racism is absurd."

=== Reading Lolita in Tehran and criticism of Azar Nafisi ===
In 2006, Dabashi sharply criticized Azar Nafisi for her book Reading Lolita in Tehran, stating that "By seeking to recycle a kaffeeklatsch version of English literature as the ideological foregrounding of American empire, Reading Lolita in Tehran is reminiscent of the most pestiferous colonial projects" and accusing her of being a "native informer and colonial agent", referencing colonial officer Thomas Macaulay, who in 1835 "decreed: 'We must do our best to form a class who may be interpreters between us and the millions whom we govern, a class of persons Indian in blood and color, but English in taste, in opinions, words and intellect.'"

In an interview with Z Magazine, Dabashi compared Nafisi to former American soldier Lynndie England, who was convicted of abusing Iraqi prisoners at Abu Ghraib."

Nafisi responded to Dabashi's criticism by stating that she is not, as Dabashi claims, a neoconservative, that she opposed the Iraq war, and that she is more interested in literature than in politics. In an interview, Nafisi stated that she has never argued for an attack on Iran and that democracy, when it comes, should come from the Iranian people (and not from US military or political intervention). She added that while she is willing to engage in "serious argument... Debate that is polarized isn't worth my time." She stated that she did not respond directly to Dabashi because "You don't want to debase yourself and start calling names."

=== Columbia pro-Palestinian encampment ===
In April 2024, following months of student protest and administrative repression amid the Gaza war and genocide, students established the "Gaza Solidarity Encampment" on Columbia's South Lawn to demand that Columbia divest from Israel. After university president Minouche Shafik authorized NYPD officers to disperse the encampment and arrest over 100 students, Dabashi joined hundreds of faculty members in a walkout on April 22, 2024, in solidarity with the arrested and suspended students. In May 2024, Dabashi published an opinion piece in Middle East Eye in support of the campus protests, writing that American universities were becoming "the site of the end of Zionist hegemony."

=== Comments on Iran protests ===
In January 2026, during a wave of anti-government protests in Iran, Dabashi stated in an interview with Al Jazeera that the demonstrations were "Israel-instigated" and alleged that Mossad agents were operating among the protesters, claiming Israel sought to distract attention from the Gaza war. In a subsequent interview, he elaborated on his position that Israel was using the protests to advance its own regional agenda.

== See also ==
- Postcolonial literature
