= Deputy Supreme Leader of Iran =

Former political post in Iran

Deputy Supreme Leadership Authority of the Islamic Republic of Iran
- قائم‌مقام رهبر جمهوری اسلامی ایران
- Emblem of Iran

- Flag of Iran

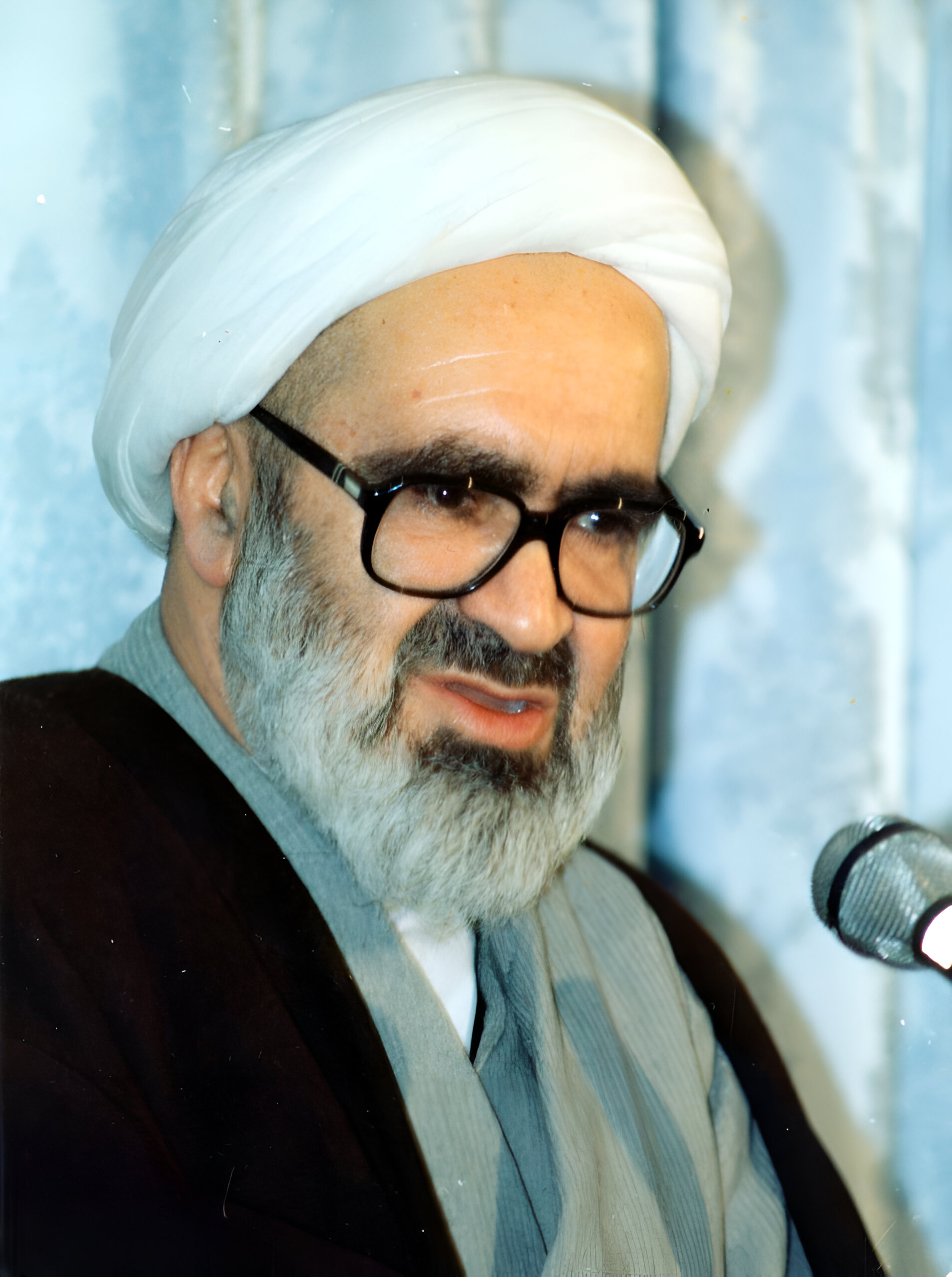
- Only officeholder Hussein-Ali Montazeri; 15 July 1985 – 30 April 1989
- Style: His Eminence
- Status: Office abolished
- Reports to: The Supreme Leader
- Seat: Tehran
- Appointer: Assembly of Experts
- Term length: Life tenure
- Formation: 15 July 1985
- Abolished: 4 June 1989

The deputy supreme leader of the Islamic Republic of Iran, (Note: Persian: قائم‌مقام رهبر جمهوری اسلامی ایران, romanized: Qâe'm-e Maqâm-e Rahbar-e Jomhuri-ye Eslâmi-ye Irân) officially the Deputy Supreme Leadership Authority, (Note: Persian: قائم‌مقام معظم رهبری, romanized: Qâe'm-e Maqâm-e Moazam-e Rahbari) was the deputy to the Supreme Leader, the highest authority in the Islamic Republic of Iran. The position was created by the Assembly of Experts in July 1985 due to the special circumstances of the Iran–Iraq War and the worsening physical condition of the supreme leader Ruhollah Khomeini. The only officeholder is Hussein-Ali Montazeri as there have been no other officeholders since his resignation in 1989.

== History ==
=== Tenure of Montazeri (1985–1989) ===
The Assembly of Experts elected Hussein-Ali Montazeri, one of Khomeini's students, to this position on 15 July 1985. On March 26 1989, Khomeini dismissed him. Montazeri resigned on 29 April 1989 from his position, On 4 June 1989, the Assembly of Experts and its chairman Akbar Hashemi Rafsanjani overwhelmingly approved his resignation and dismissal. One of the reasons of Montazeri's resignation were government policies that Montazeri claimed infringed on people's freedom and denied them their rights, especially after the 1988 mass execution of political prisoners.

Montazeri was dismissed by Khomeini in a letter dated to either March 26 or 29 April 1989, which was again approved by Khomeini one day later. This letter was not made public at the time and was published a few years later, so some have questioned the letter's validity. Three months after Montazeri was dismissed as the deputy leader, Khomeini died on June 3, 1989. The next day, the Assembly of Experts elected Ali Khamenei as the supreme leader of Iran. Akbar Hashemi Rafsanjani, who was one of the transmitters of Khomeini's letter to Montazeri's dismissal, was one of the opponents of Montazeri's dismissal at the time.

=== Potential reestablishment ===
During the presidency of Hassan Rouhani and amid longstanding rumors of Khamenei's declining health, it was recommended to Khamenei to reestablish the office of Deputy Supreme Leader to better facilitate the transition to new leadership.

== List ==
No.	Portrait	Name (Birth–Death)	Term of office			Party/Grouping	Faction	Election	Supreme Leader	President	Prime Minister	Notes
No.	Portrait	Name (Birth–Death)	Took office	Left office	Time in office	Party/Grouping	Faction	Election	Supreme Leader	President	Prime Minister	Notes
1		Hussein-Ali Montazeri حسینعلی منتظری (1922–2009)	15 July 1985	30 April 1989	3 years, 9 months and 15 days	Islamic Republican Party (1985–1987) Society of Seminary Teachers of Qom (1987–1989)	Reformists	1985	Ruhollah Khomeini	Ali Khamenei	Mir-Hossein Mousavi	Chairman of the Assembly of Experts for Constitution in 1979 and Tehran's Friday Prayer Imam from 1979 to 1980
Vacant (30 April 1989 – 4 June 1989)
Post abolished (4 June 1989 – present)

== See also ==
- Supreme Leader of Iran
- Iranian Revolution
- Assembly of Experts
- 1985 Iranian deputy supreme leader election
