= Hussein-Ali Montazeri =

Deputy Supreme Leader of Iran from 1985 to 1989

Grand Ayatollah Hussein-Ali Montazeri
- حسینعلی منتظری
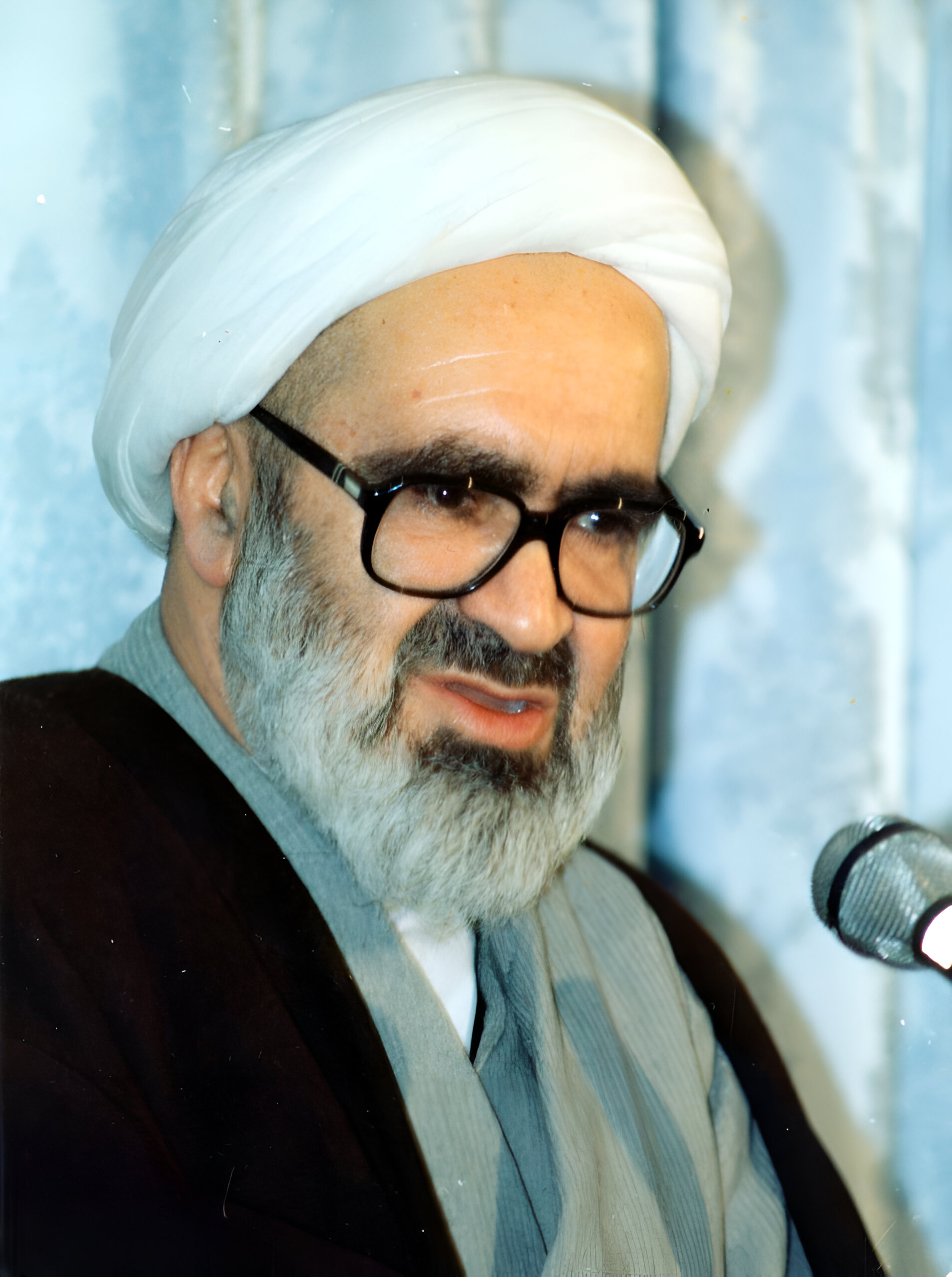
- Montazeri in 1989

Deputy Supreme Leader of Iran
- In office 15 July 1985 – 30 April 1989
- Supreme Leader: Ruhollah Khomeini
- President: Ali Khamenei
- Prime Minister: Mir-Hossein Mousavi
- Preceded by: Office established
- Succeeded by: Office abolished (Note: From 26 March to 4 June, the office was vacant and wasn't officially abolished until 4 June 1989)

Chairman of the Assembly of Experts for Constitution
- In office 19 August 1979 – 15 November 1979
- Deputy: Mohammad Beheshti
- Preceded by: Position created
- Succeeded by: Position abolished

Member of the Assembly of Experts for Constitution
- In office 15 August 1979 – 15 November 1979
- Constituency: Tehran Province
- Majority: 1,672,980 (66.24%)

Tehran's Friday Prayer Imam
- In office 12 September 1979 – 14 January 1980
- Appointed by: Ruhollah Khomeini
- Preceded by: Mahmoud Taleghani
- Succeeded by: Ali Khamenei

Personal details
- Born: Hussein-Ali Montazeri Najafabadi; 24 September 1922 Najafabad, Iran
- Died: 19 December 2009 (aged 87) Qom, Iran
- Resting place: Fatima Masumeh Shrine
- Party: Islamic Republican Party (1980–1987)
- Other political affiliations: Society of Seminary Teachers of Qom (1961–2009)
- Spouse: Mah-Sultan Rabbani (m. 1942)
- Children: 7, including Mohammad
- Website: amontazeri.com

Personal life
- Main interests: Fiqh; irfan; Islamic philosophy; Islamic ethics; hadith
- Notable ideas: Guardianship of the Islamic Jurist; Islamic democracy
- Education: Isfahan Seminary; Qom Seminary

Religious life
- Religion: Islam
- Denomination: Twelver Shia
- Jurisprudence: Ja'fari
- Creed: Usuli

Muslim leader
- Teacher: Hossein Borujerdi; Ruhollah Khomeini
- Post: Qom Seminary; Feyziyeh School
- Students: Abdolkarim Soroush; Emadeddin Baghi; Mohsen Kadivar; Ahmad Ghabel; Hassan Yousefi Eshkevari

Hussein-Ali Montazeri Najafabadi (Note: Persian: حسینعلی منتظری نجف‌آبادی, romanized: Hoseyn-Ali Montazeri,pronounced [hosejnæˈliːje montæzeˈɾiː nædʒæfɒːˈbɒːdi]) (24 September 1922 – 19 December 2009) was an Iranian cleric, politician, theologian, writer, human rights activist and democracy advocate who served as the only deputy supreme leader of Iran from 1985 to 1989. A Grand Ayatollah and reformist, he was one of the major leaders of the Iranian Revolution, the spiritual leader of the Iranian Green Movement, and one of the highest-ranking authorities in Shia Islam.

Born in Najafabad to a poor family, he began his religious education at Isfahan Seminary and began studying the Quran and Arabic from a young age. He opposed the White Revolution and supported anti-Shah leaders, more notably Ruhollah Khomeini. After Khomeini's exile in 1964, Montazeri "sat at the center of the clerical network", which Khomeini had established to oppose the Shah's rule. After gaining popularity in the late 1960's, the SAVAK arrested him and he was sent to Evin Prison in 1974 but was released amid the Iranian Revolution in 1978. After the Shah's fall, he served major positions such as the Speaker of the Assembly of Experts for Constitution in 1979 and rose the ranks to then being elected deputy supreme leader by the Assembly of Experts in 1985.

Montazeri was once designated by Ruhollah Khomeini as the successor to the supreme leadership; however, they had a falling-out in 1989 over Montazeri strongly opposing the 1988 mass execution of political prisoners, arguing that the executions were incompatible with Islamic principles. Khomeini formally dismissed him as his successor in 1989, declaring that he had come to regret his appointment. Montazeri spent his later years in Qom and remained politically influential in Iran but was placed under house arrest in 1997 for questioning "the unaccountable rule exercised by the supreme leader", Ali Khamenei, who succeeded Ruhollah Khomeini. He was known as the most knowledgeable senior Islamic scholar in Iran, a grand marja (religious authority) of Shia Islam, and was said to be one of Khamenei's teachers.

For more than two decades, Montazeri was one of the main critics of the Islamic Republic's domestic and foreign policy. He had also been an active advocate of Baháʼí Faith rights, civil rights, and women's rights in Iran. Montazeri was a prolific writer of books and articles. He was a staunch proponent of an Islamic state, and he argued that post-revolutionary Iran was not being ruled as an Islamic state. His death and funeral in December 2009 was said to have marked "a new phase" in the presidential election protests due to his support for the Green Movement, led by former prime minister Mir-Hossein Mousavi.

== Early life and public career ==
Born in 1922, Montazeri was from a peasant family in Najafabad, a city in Isfahan Province, 400 kilometers south of Tehran. His early theological education was at Isfahan Seminary. After Khomeini was forced into exile by the Shah, Montazeri "sat at the center of the clerical network", which Khomeini had established to oppose Pahlavi rule.

He became a teacher at the Faiziyeh Theological School. While there he answered Khomeini's call to protest the White Revolution of Shah Mohammad Reza Pahlavi in June 1963 and was active in anti-Shah clerical circles. In late 1960s, Montazeri gained influence and popularity in Isfahan Province after his speeches criticizing the Shah, moving SAVAK to banish and subsequently imprison him. He was sent to prison in 1974 and released in 1978 in time to be active during the revolution. Montazeri then went to Qom where he studied theology.

== Iranian Revolution (1979–1985) ==
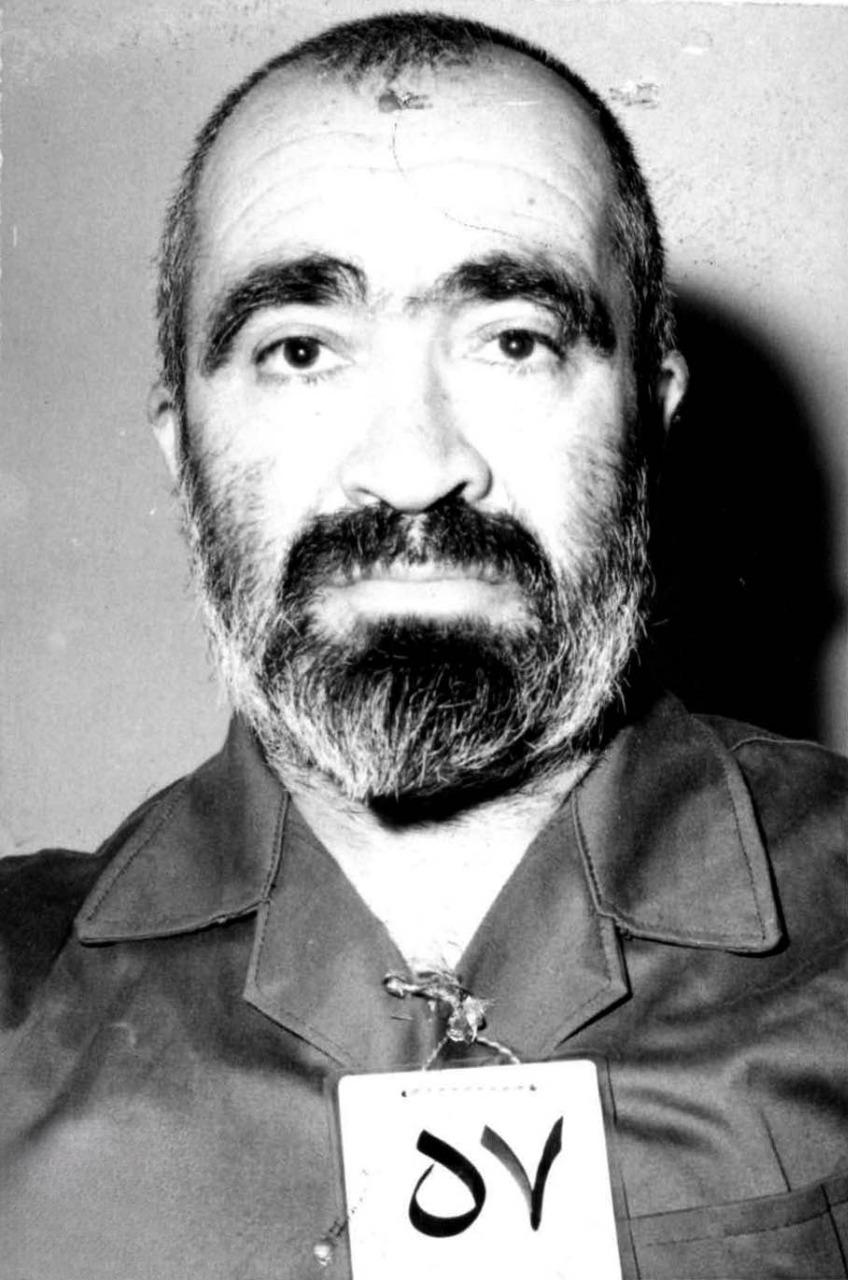
Hossein-Ali Montazeri in Evin prison after his arrest by SAVAK in 1975

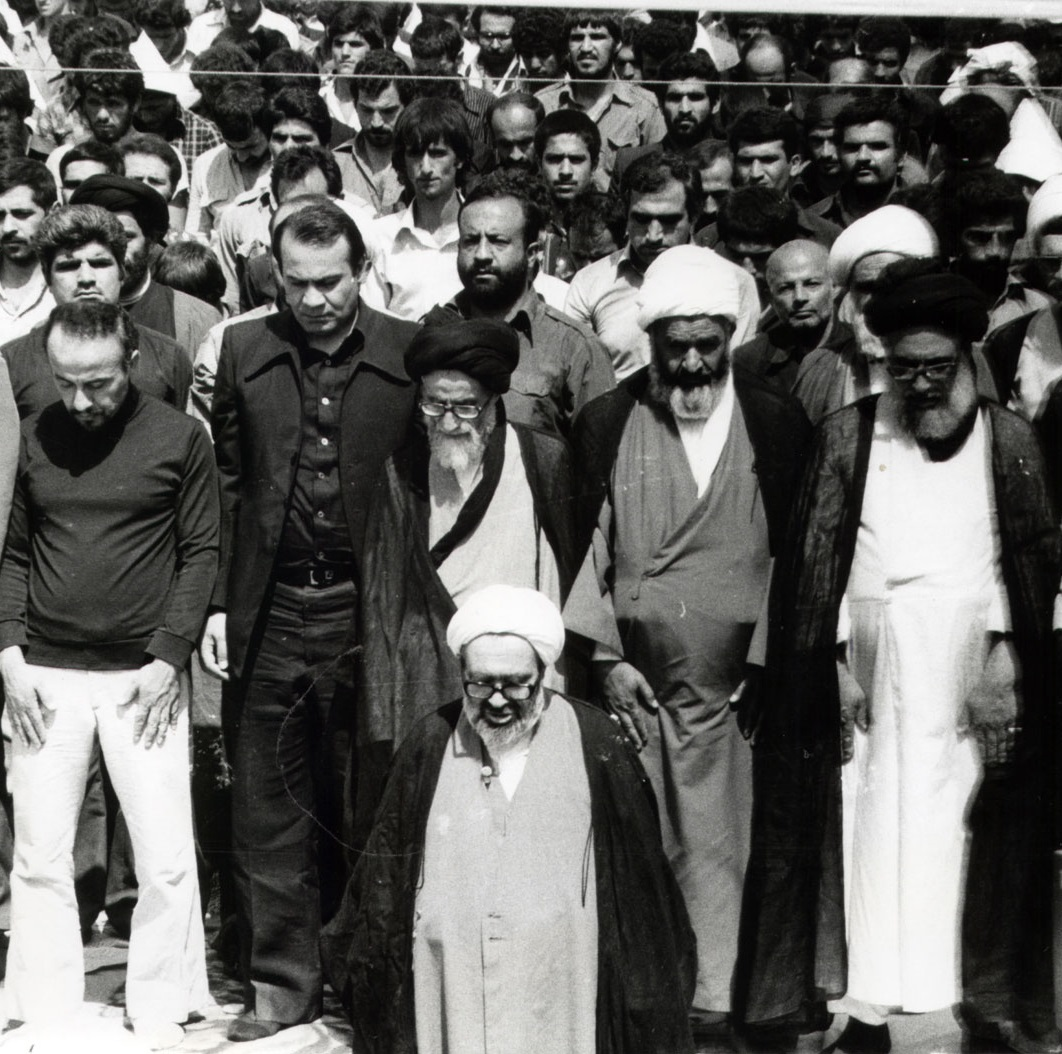
Montazeri as Tehran's Friday Prayer Imam leading prayers on 14 September 1979

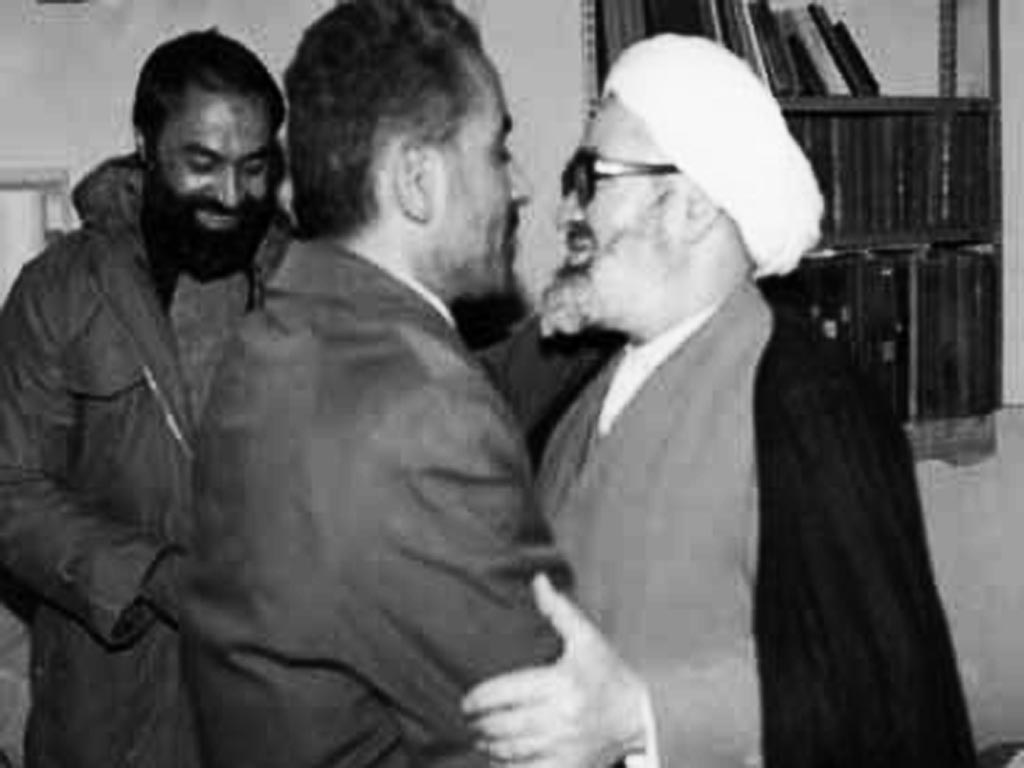
Montazeri with Mohammad-Ali Rajai in 1981

Montazeri was known as an Islamic jurist who was made to pay for his liberal-leaning beliefs. He supported a democratic republic as the best form of government; however in his ideal model for government, an Islamic jurist acts as a supervisor and advisor, what he, along with Ayatollah Khomeini, termed as velayat-e faqih. He was the author of Dirasāt fī wilāyah al-faqīh, a scholarly book advocating the supervision of the administration by Islamic jurists. He believed in the independence of the government and did not accept any executive and policy making role for the Islamic jurist. Montazeri asserted that the rule of the jurisprudent should not be an absolute rule; instead, it should be limited to the function of advisor to the rulers, who are elected by the people.

In 1979, following the overthrow of the Shah, he played a pivotal role in instituting Iran's new constitution. He was one of the leaders of the movement to replace the democratic and secular draft constitution proposed for the Islamic Republic with one where the supervision of Islamic jurists was recognized. He distributed "a detailed commentary and alternate draft" for Iran's new constitution. It included proposals to specify that Twelver Shi'ism—and not Islam in general—was the official religion of the state and to state that Islamic jurists should appoint judges with the right of veto over all laws and actions that are against the Islamic principles. Later he served on the Assembly of Experts (Majles-e-Khobregan) that wrote the constitution and that implemented many of his proposals.

During this time, Montazeri also served as Friday prayer leader of Qom, as a member of the Revolutionary Council and as deputy to Supreme Leader Khomeini. Khomeini began "to transfer some of his power" to Montazeri, in 1980. By 1983 "all government offices hung a small picture" of Montazeri next to that of Khomeini. In 1984, Montazeri became a grand ayatollah.

== Deputy Supreme Leader of Iran (1985–1989) ==
Montazeri initially rejected Khomeini's proposal to make him his successor, insisting that the choice of successor be left to the democratically elected Assembly of Experts. Later, Montazeri relented, and following a session of the Assembly of Experts on 23 November 1985, he was officially appointed Khomeini's successor as Supreme Leader.

Some observers believe Khomeini chose him for this role solely because of his support for Khomeini's principle of theocratic rule by Islamic jurists. Khomeini's proposed form of administration called for the most learned, or one of the most learned, Islamic jurists to "rule", and of all those who might be considered a leading Islamic jurist, only Montazeri supported theocracy. In Montazeri's opinion, however the jurist would not act as an absolute ruler, instead, he would act as an advisor and consultant.

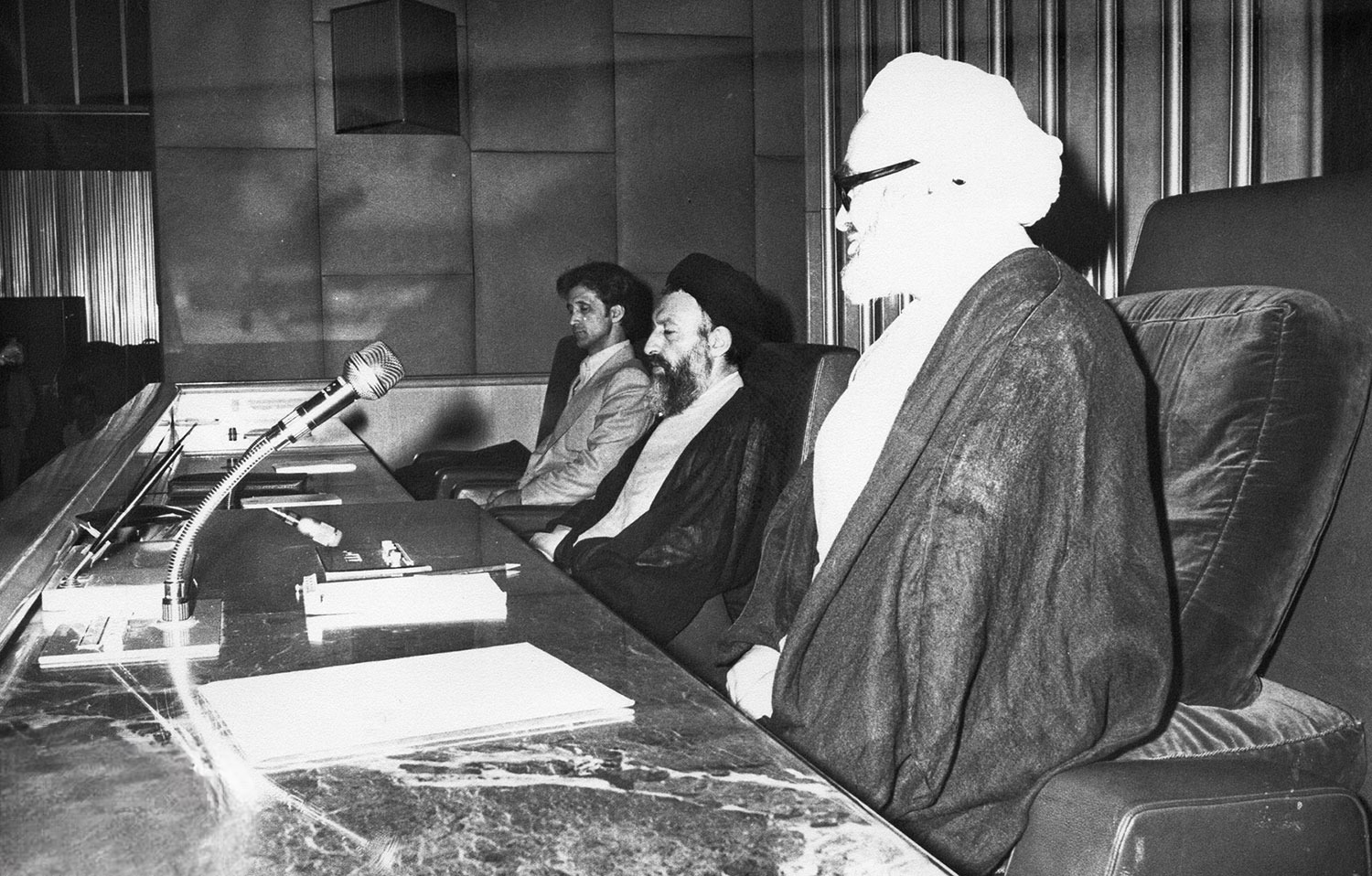
Montazeri (right) with Mohammad Beheshti (center), and Hassan Ayat (left) during the Assembly for the Final Review of the Constitution session in 1979

Montazeri fell short of the theological requirements of the supreme Faqih. He could not claim descent from the Prophet nor did he possess all the credentials of a revered scholar of Islamic law. His religious followers were few. And he lacked the all-important charisma. His selection had happened for one reason—he was the only one among the candidates for Faqih who totally endorsed Khomeini's vision of Islamic government.

In addition, traditionalists did not approve Montazeri's designation as successor due to several reasons, including his problematic persona in Shiite seminaries during the reign of the Shah and his support for Ali Shariati’s and for Nematollah Salehi Najaf Abadi's works. Montazeri's leadership qualifications were further hurt by not being a seyyed, or descendant of the Prophet Mohammed, traditionally wearing the black turban in Shiite Islam, like Khomeini and Khomeini's successor Supreme Leader Ayatollah Ali Khamenei. In the early years of the revolution, he was not as popular as he was in the last two decades of his life. The middle class and elites would mock him in those early years.

After his appointment, Montazeri considered himself increasingly responsible for state policy and identified education, liberation movements, and the judicial system, particularly the treatment of political prisoners, as crucial to the viability of a just Islamic community. His concern with justice and the plight of disadvantaged people contributed to his popularity among lower- and lower-middle-class Iranians.

== Dispute with Khomeini and house arrest ==
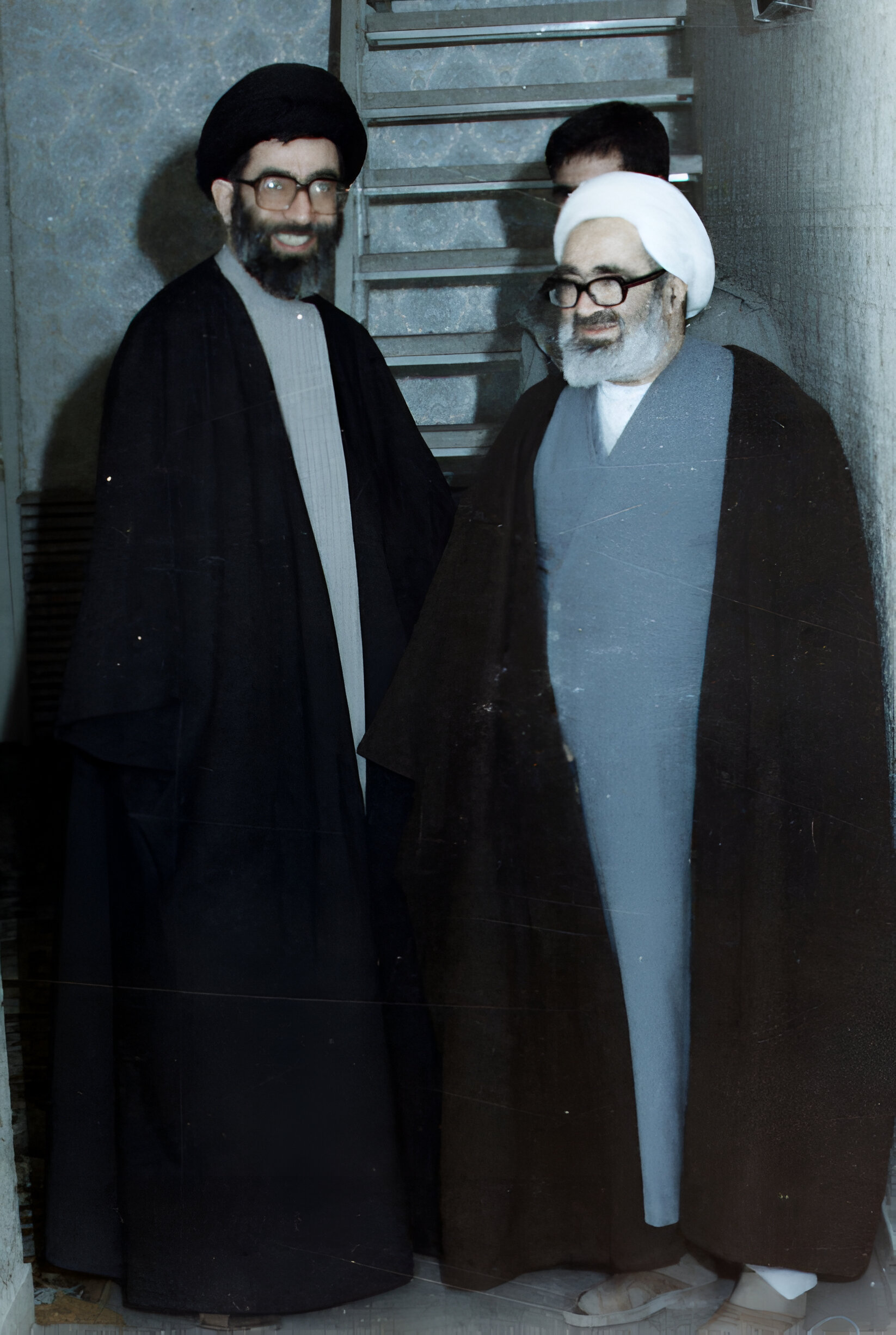
Ali Khamenei (left) with Montazeri (right)

Montazeri was one of Ruhollah Khomeini's closest pupils and was designated as his successor in 1985. Khomeini reportedly regarded him as the "fruit of his life", while Montazeri admired Khomeini's determination and religious commitment.

Relations between the two men deteriorated during the second half of the 1980s. According to Mehdi Karroubi, tensions intensified in 1986 after Montazeri sent Khomeini a letter questioning aspects of the Islamic Republic's political system. Montazeri's association with Mehdi Hashemi, who operated from his office in Qom, also became a source of tension. Hashemi was arrested, convicted of counterrevolutionary activities, and executed in September 1987.

Montazeri subsequently became increasingly critical of aspects of the government's domestic and foreign policies. In November 1987, he called for political parties to be legalized under government regulation and advocated an open examination of the Revolution's failures. He also argued that Iran should promote the Revolution by example rather than by supporting armed movements abroad. Khomeini responded by publicly criticizing Montazeri and, in early 1988, called for a meeting of the Assembly of Experts to discuss his position.

The decisive rupture followed the 1988 executions of Iranian political prisoners. Montazeri strongly opposed the executions and sent several letters to Khomeini protesting them. In one letter, he argued that the executions were being carried out without adequate judicial procedures and warned that the execution of thousands of prisoners in a short period would have serious consequences for the Islamic Republic. He also sent representatives to prisons where prisoners were being held and personally confronted members of the judicial commission responsible for the executions.

Montazeri also criticized Khomeini's fatwa ordering the assassination of author Salman Rushdie saying: "People in the world are getting the idea that our business in Iran is just murdering people."

Following Montazeri's criticism of the mass purge of political prisoners, Khomeini wrote to Montazeri on 26 March 1989 informing him that he was no longer considered eligible to succeed him as leader of the state. In the letter, Khomeini accused Montazeri of having been influenced by liberals. Montazeri replied on 27 March, stating that he was not prepared to assume the position and asking to return to the seminary. While Montazeri's resignation letter was seemingly forced, Khomeini acknowledged the letter on 28 March and thanked Montazeri for his resigning.

Articles and editorials then appeared in various newspapers aimed at "dismantling" Montazeri's "impeccable" revolutionary credentials. References to him were removed from state media, publication of his lectures in Kayhan was discontinued, his portraits were removed from government offices and mosques, and his security detail was withdrawn. He subsequently became an outspoken critic of the Islamic Republic's political system. After Khomeini's death in June 1989, Montazeri was not involved in the selection of his successor, and Ali Khamenei was chosen as Supreme Leader after the constitutional requirement that the leader be a marja was removed.

== Post-deputy leadership (1989–2009) ==
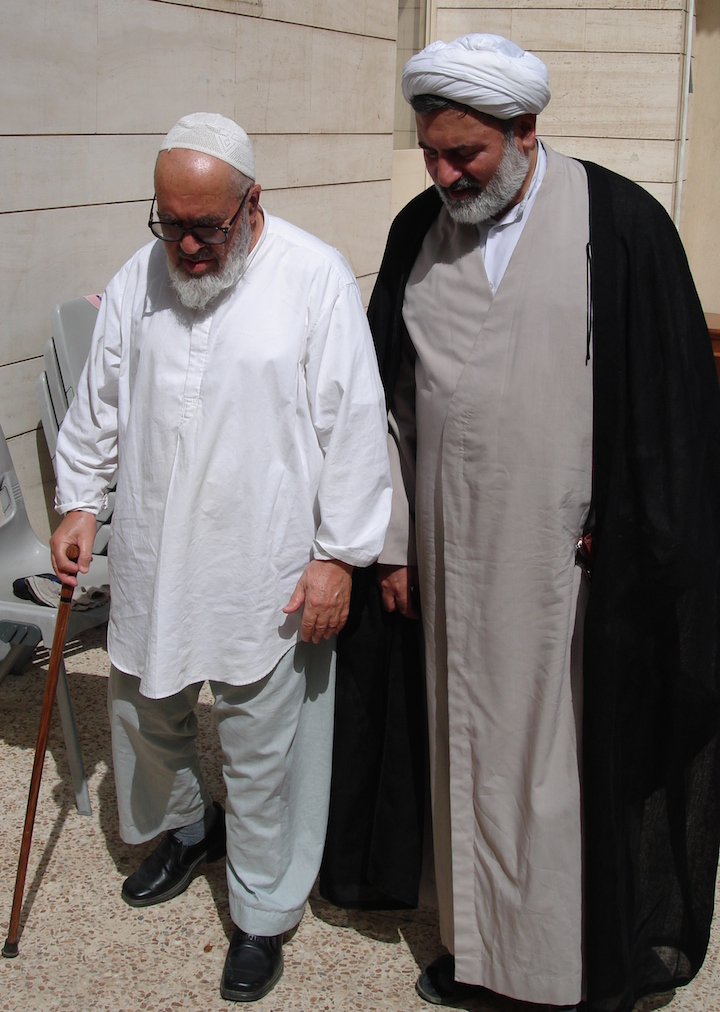
Mohsen Kadivar meeting with Montazeri in 2005

Khomeini died in June 1989 and another cleric, Ali Khamenei, was selected by the Assembly of Experts to be the new Supreme Leader. Khamenei had been a high-ranking Hojatoleslam before Montazeri's removal. His promotion was accepted by many Shi'a, among the exceptions being Montazeri.

In December 1989, Montazeri's supporters in Qom distributed "night letters" questioning Khamenei's qualifications to be a Marja-e Taqlid ("Source of Emulation"), or in other words, an Ayatollah. In retaliation Revolutionary Guards "detained and humiliated" Montazeri, "forcing him to wear his nightcap rather than his white turban."

In October 1997, after openly criticizing the authority of Khamenei, Montazeri was placed under house arrest under the pretext of protecting him from hardliners. He was freed from house arrest in 2003 after more than 100 Iranian legislators called on President Khatami to free him. Some thought that the government lifted the house arrest to avoid the possibility of a popular backlash if the ailing Montazeri died while in custody.

=== Criticism of the government ===
During the 1988 executions of Iranian political prisoners, Montazeri wrote to Khomeini saying "at least order to spare women who have children ... the execution of several thousand prisoners in a few days will not reflect positively and will not be mistake-free ... A large number of prisoners have been killed under torture by interrogators ... in some prisons of the Islamic Republic young girls are being raped ... As a result of unruly torture, many prisoners have become deaf or paralysed or afflicted with chronic disease."

On 22 January 2007, Montazeri criticized former Iranian President Mahmoud Ahmadinejad for his nuclear and economic policies.

While agreeing Iran had the right to develop nuclear energy, he called Ahmadinejad's approach to the issue aggressive, saying, "One has to deal with the enemy with wisdom, not provoke it, ... his (provocation) only creates problems for the country" and asked, "Don't we have other rights too?" referring to individual and human rights. Montazeri also criticized Iran’s economic performance under Ahmadinejad's administration, noting the rate of inflation—including a 50% increase in housing costs—and arguing that a country cannot be run on "slogans".

Montazeri, in a 2008 interview with Voice of America concerning the 29th anniversary of the revolution, stated that the revolution had given Islam a bad name, arguing "Unfortunately, it is only by name that the revolution remains Islamic. Its content has changed, and what is taking place in the name of Islam gives a bad image of the religion. This is the religion of kindness and tolerance." He also issued a statement in 2008 in support of the rights of the persecuted Baháʼís in the Islamic Republic, saying that though Baháʼís were not People of the Book like Jews, Christians and Zoroastrians, nonetheless:

"[T]hey are the citizens of this country, they have the right of citizenship and to live in this country. Furthermore, they must benefit from the Islamic compassion which is stressed in Quran and by the religious authorities."

Montazeri again spoke out against Ahmadinejad on 16 June 2009 during the protests against his reelection. Ahmadinejad was controversially reelected as president after a closely contested and disputed race, which involved many candidates, but whose front-runners were Ahmadinejad and former Prime Minister Mir Hossein Mousavi. The government reported that Ahmadinejad had won the election with 62 percent of the vote. Montazeri stated that "No one in their right mind can believe" the results were fairly counted. Montazeri called for three days of public mourning for the death of Neda Agha-Soltan and others killed during 20 June protests. He further declared that the then current ruling government was neither Islamic nor a republic, but military. In November 2009, on the day before the 30th anniversary celebration of the Iran hostage crisis, Montazeri said that the occupation of the American embassy in 1979 had been a mistake.

=== Human rights and gender ===
While Ayatollah Montazeri has been celebrated as a champion of the rights of political prisoners, and human rights associated with the public sphere, in an interview conducted in 2003 in Qom with the Iranian feminist academic Golbarg Bashi he said that while men and women enjoy the same dignity and respect in the eyes of God, women's rights must remain strictly under the domain of Shi'i fiqh rather than international human rights conventions such as CEDAW.

In response to Golbarg Bashi, Ayatollah Montazeri said:

Women are humans too... When we say humans, it includes both men and women... you see, if people around the world want to say certain things about women for example being equal to men in matters of inheritance or legal testimony, because these issues pertain to the very letter of the Qur'an, we cannot accept them... Now, consider that God Almighty has made it incumbent upon men to cover the expenses of women... in Iran we cannot accept those laws that are against our religion... on certain occasions that these laws contradict the very clear text of the Qur'an, we cannot cooperate... Men in general (no'-e mard ha), all things considered, are productively more active—both intellectual activities and practical activities... All things considered, the intellectual and practical activities of men are more than women.

When Bashi informed him that currently (2003) in Iranian universities, "some 60% of students are women" and asked him "so in future generations, when the number of professors, physicians, high-ranking experts, etc, will be mostly women, will Islam be able to have an ijtihad and modify these unjust laws because they no longer correspond with reality?", Ayatollah Montazeri responded: "Those aspects of the Islamic law that are based on the very letter of the Qur'an, the answer is no. But certain other things yes, you can, and they can be subject to changing times. But those that are from the very letter of the Qur'an, no they cannot, and those have certain wisdom and subtleties in them."

== Death and funeral ==
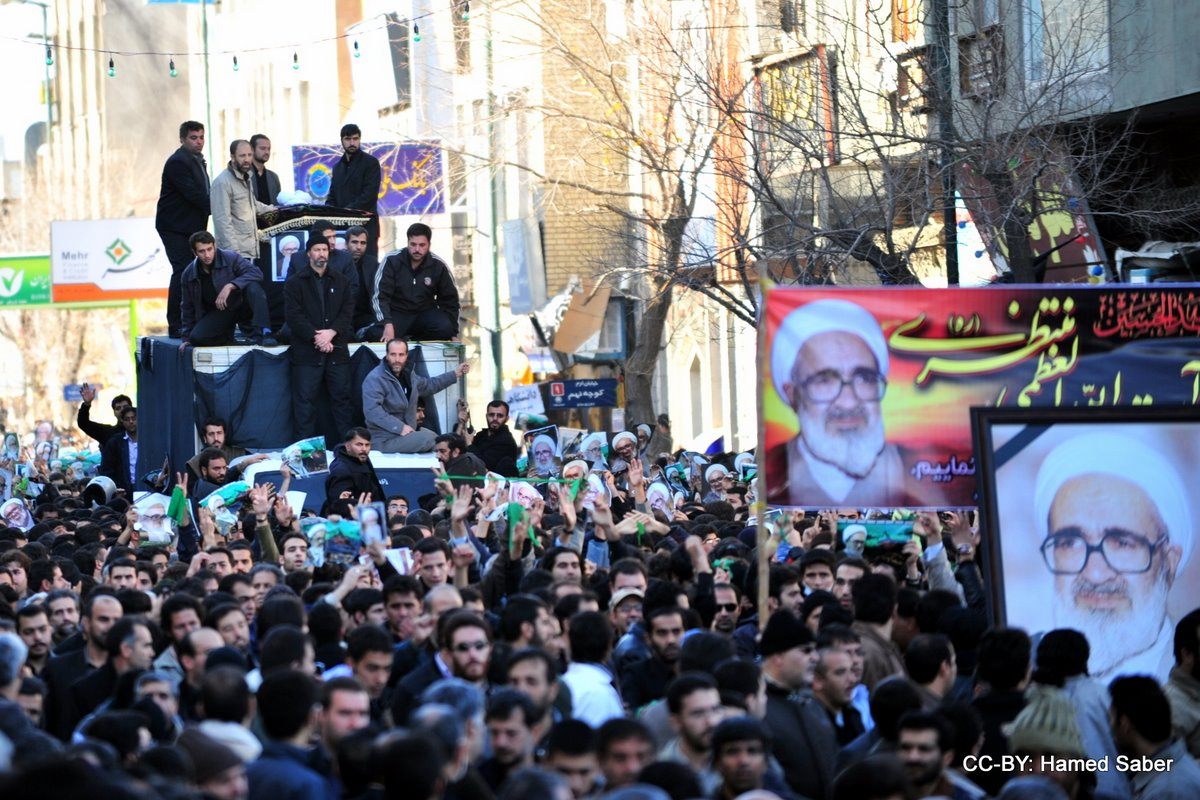
Montazeri's followers mourning him near Fatima Masumeh Shrine

People reciting verses of the Quran at Ayatollah Montazeri's grave

On 19 December 2009, Montazeri died in his sleep of heart failure at his home in Qom, at the age of 87. The Islamic Republic News Agency, the official news agency of Iran, did not use the Ayatollah title in its initial reports of his death and referred to him as the "clerical figure of rioters". The state television and radio broadcasters were similar, showing the tension between the government and its opponents. Montazeri's funeral was said to have marked "a new phase" in the 2009 Iranian presidential election protests.

On 21 December, hundreds of thousands of mourners and the Iranian Green Movement turned out at Montazeri's funeral and turned it into a protest against the government. The funeral began at his house and prayers were held at the Grand Mosque in Qom. After special prayers by Ayatollah Mousa Shabiri Zanjani, Montazeri's body was laid to rest in the Fatima Masumeh Shrine. He was buried alongside his son, Mohammad.

The protesters chanted opposition slogans, including "Our shame, our shame, our idiot leader", and “Dictator, this is your last message: the people of Iran are rising!” Although the police mostly stayed clear of the funeral, there were skirmishes between protesters and the Basij militia. Inside the Fatima shrine, opposition activists gathered and chanted “Death to the dictator.” When pro-government basiji militiamen came toward them, chanting “Death to the hypocrites,” the crowd changed to an anti-basiji slogan. Then they took out money, offering it to the basiji, and chanted that they were acting as paid mercenaries of the government: “Where is the oil money? Spent on the Basiji,” and “Basij’s great pride, rape in prison.”

Mir-Hossein Mousavi left the compound of Grand Ayatollah Saanei, a fellow reformist, to cross the street to Montazeri’s house. At that moment, a group of 30 bearded men, holding Montazeri pictures to blend into the crowd, dropped the portraits, started attacking Mousavi and shouted “death to the hypocrite.” The former candidate was hustled into the Montazeri compound. The same thing happened when cleric Mehdi Karroubi stepped into the street, reformists were ready and pushed back the vigilantes, so Karroubi could pass.

As the funeral procession ended, security forces poured into the city, blocking roads to the Ayatollah's house and tearing down posters of him. Mourners were reported to have thrown stones at police, who tried to stop them chanting pro-Montazeri slogans. Mourners responded defiantly when ordered by loudspeaker not to chant, breaking into shouts of "Ya Hossein, Mir Hossein" in support of him. When a crowd of pro-government supporters chanted back: "I will give my life for the supreme leader," they were booed by mourners, a witness said. The security forces prevented the Ayatollah's family from holding a memorial ceremony in the grand mosque of Qom following the funeral.

== Legacy ==
The fourth death anniversary memorial service for Ayatollah Hussein-Ali Montazeri in Qom, 2013

According to journalist Christopher de Bellaigue, Montazeri was regarded as "brilliant" by his allies, and even his opponents; de Bellaigue added that Montazeri "lives plainly, and equates Islam with social justice". Montazeri's detractors portrayed him as stubborn and naïve in his insistence that the Islamic republic find reconciliation with the "hypocrites" and "liberals" who are its "internal enemies."

In 1980s, Montazeri was known by the pejorative nickname Gorbeh Nareh (Persian: گربه‌نره, the masculine cat) after the Cat, a character in the Pinocchio animated series. According to Elaine Sciolino, this was due to his "poor public speaking skills, squeaky voice, round face and grizzled beard".

== Personal life ==
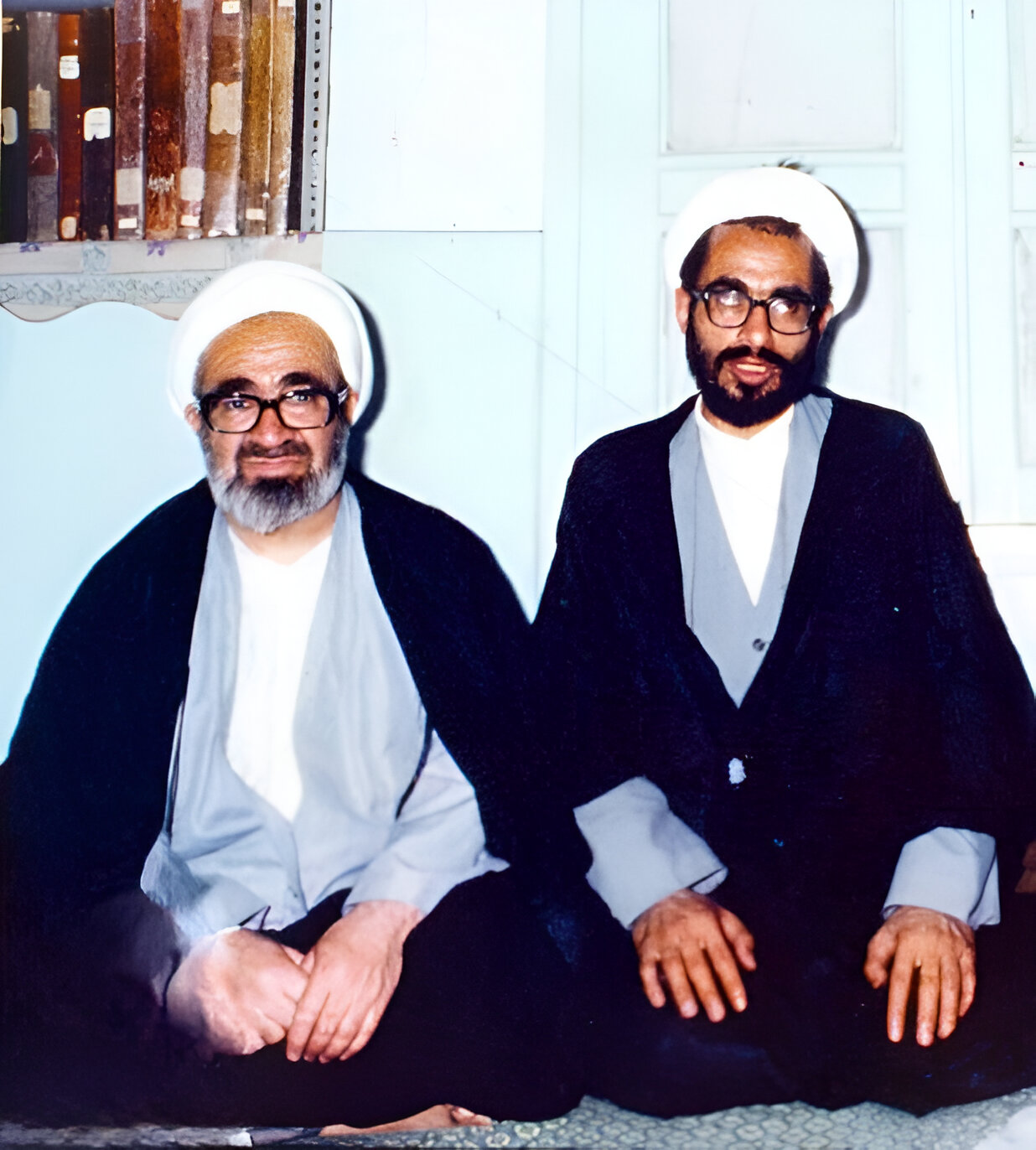
Hussein-Ali (left) with his son Mohammad (right) in 1980

On 4 September 1942, Montazeri married Mah-Sultan Rabbani (1926 – 26 March 2010) and had seven children, four daughters and three sons. One of his sons, Mohammad Montazeri, died in a bomb blast at Islamic Republican Party headquarters in 1981 which was carried out by the People's Mujahedin of Iran; another, Saeed Montazeri, lost an eye in the Iran-Iraq war in 1985. Another son, Ahmad Montazeri, is a cleric in Qom; during the 1970s Ahmad underwent military training in Fatah camps in Lebanon. The brother of Montazeri's son-in-law, Mehdi Hashemi, was sentenced to death and executed after the 1979 revolution due to his alleged involvement in the murder of Ayatollah Abul Hassan Shams Abadi, who had been a critic of Montazeri, in Isfahan.

He was described by Ayatollah Mohammad Guilani as "meticulous about, if not obsessed by, cleanliness."

During the 2025–2026 Iranian protests, the daughter and granddaughter of Montazeri's grandson were arrested.

== See also ==
- Ruhollah Khomeini
- Seyed Reza Bahaadini

== Notes ==
Assembly seats
New office	Chairman of Assembly of Experts for Constitution; 1979	Office abolished
Political offices
New office	Deputy Supreme Leader of Iran; 1985–1989	Office abolished
Religious titles
Preceded by Mahmoud Taleghani	Friday prayers Imam of Tehran; 1979–1980	Succeeded by Ali Khamenei
