= Negar Mottahedeh =

Iranian cultural critic and film theorist

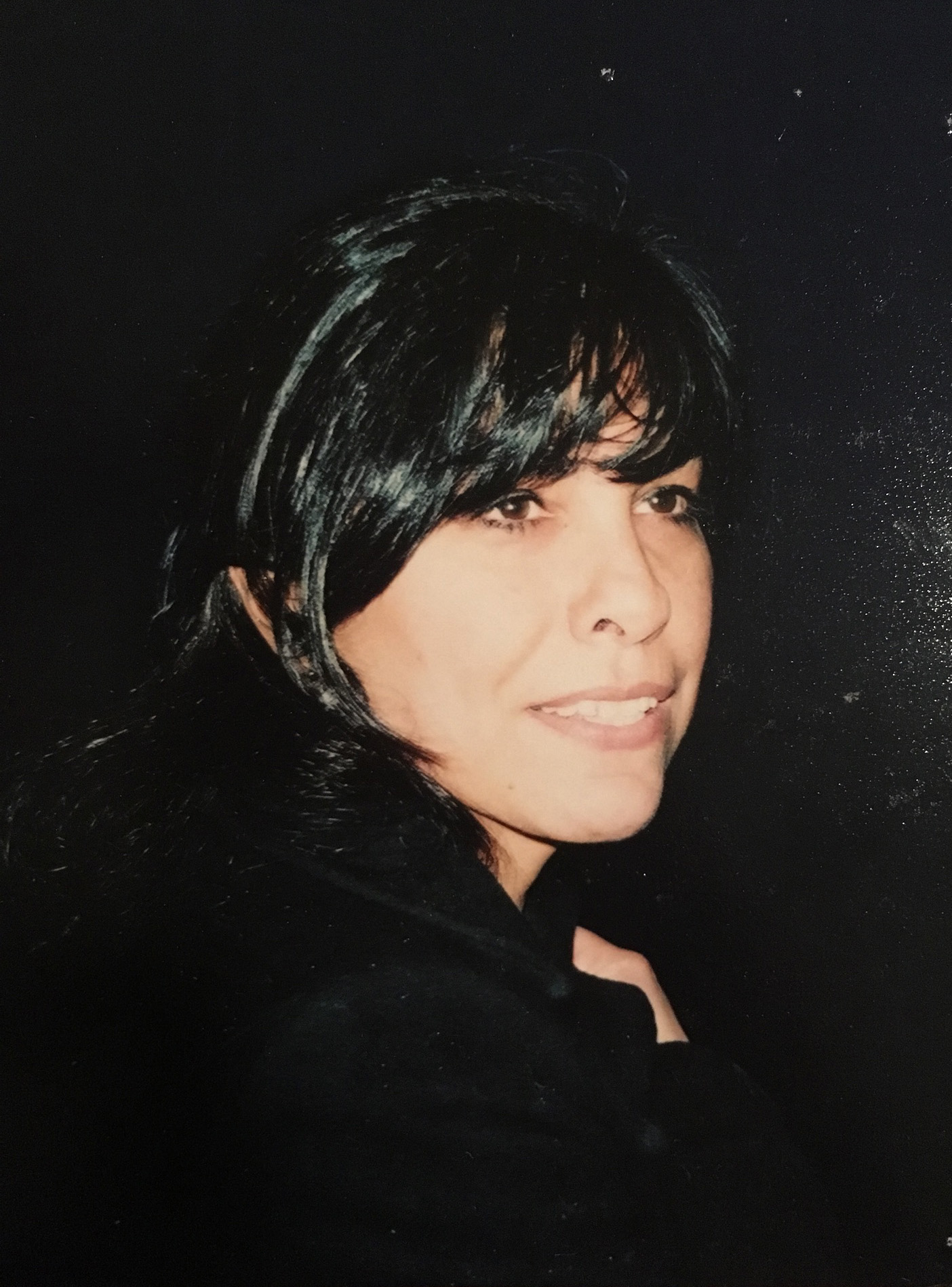
Negar Mottahedeh in 2017.

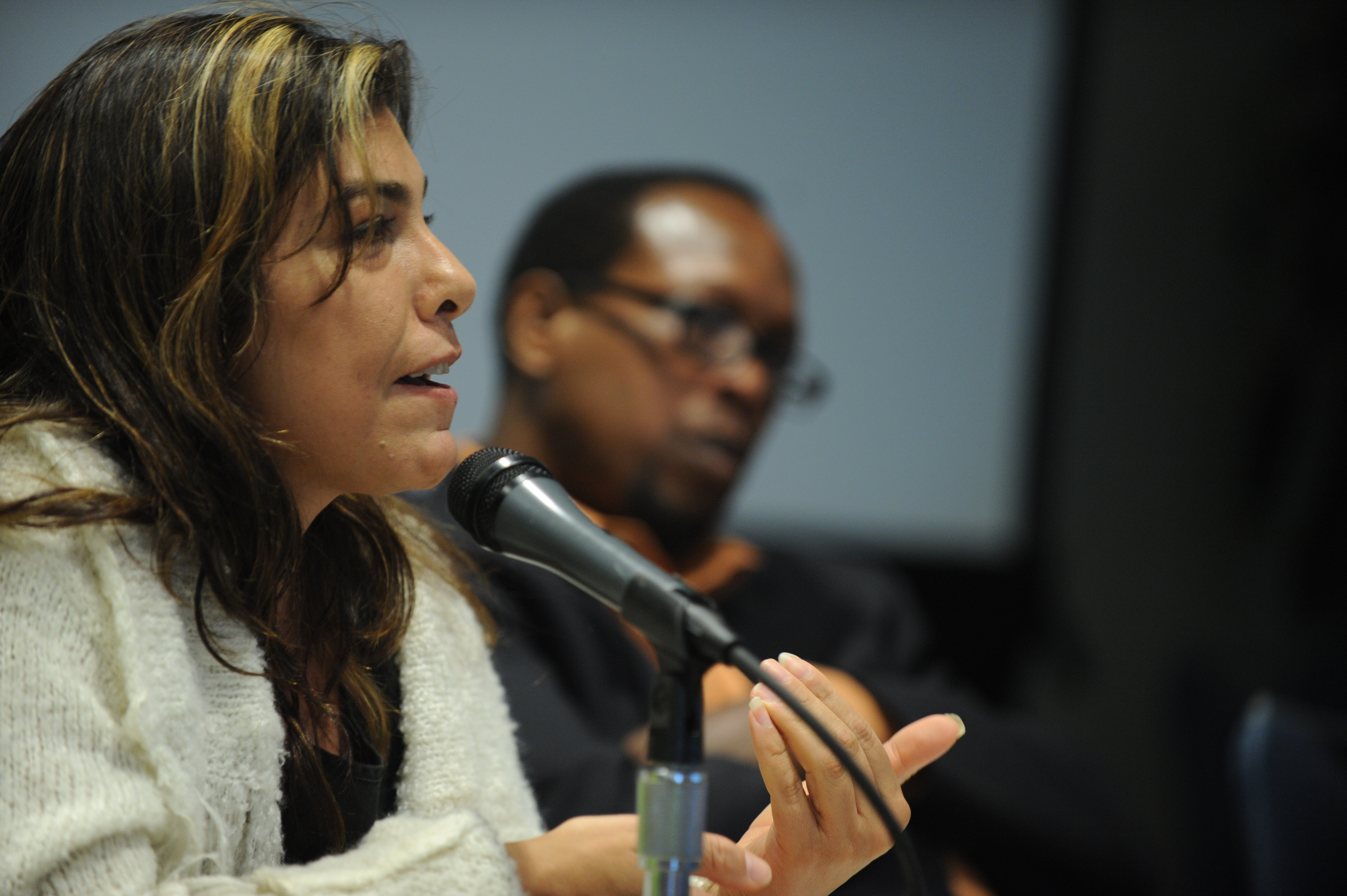
Negar Mottahedeh at 2010 on "The Future of Learning is the Web" at Elon University. In the background is Mark Anthony Neal also of Duke University.

Negar Mottahedeh is a cultural critic and film theorist specializing in interdisciplinary and feminist contributions to the fields of Middle Eastern Studies and Film Studies.

== Early life ==
She is known for her work on Iranian Cinema, but has also published on the history of reform and revolution, on `Abdu'l-Baha's vision of human solidarity and peace in the 20th Century, on Bábism, Qajar history, performance traditions in Iran, the history of technology, visual theory, Majid Tavakoli and the Men in Scarves Movement (also known as the "I am Majid" campaign), and the role of social media in the 2009–2010 Iranian election protests. With the publication of #iranelection: Hashtag Solidarity and the Transformation of online life in 2015, she expanded her focus to the cultures and practices of the web, writing on the political efficacy of selfies, memes and gifs in The Hill (2017), and pieces on internet security and Iranian hacker culture on WIRED's platform Backchannel (2017). She also wrote articles for Observer, covering the effects of President Trump's travel ban, and the persecution of the Jews and the Baháʼí (2017).

She received her Ph.D. in 1998 from the University of Minnesota. She has taught at the Ohio Wesleyan University in Delaware, Ohio, and in 2002 began teaching at Duke University, where she is Professor in the Program in Literature. Mottahedeh curated the "Reel Evil: Films from the Axis of Evil" film festival with Miriam Cooke in 2003.

== Later career ==
Mottahedeh became a full professor at Duke University in 2019.. In 2026 she became the inaugural visiting lecturer for a new annual Bahá'í Faith lectureship and course at Stanford Iranian Studies Program..

== Publications ==
=== Books ===
- Negar, Mottahedeh (2008). Displaced Allegories: Post-Revolutionary Iranian Cinema. Duke University Press Books. p. 216. ISBN 978-0-822-34275-5.
- Negar, Mottahedeh (2008). Representing the Unpresentable: Historical Images of National Reform from the Qajars to the Islamic Republic of Iran (Gender, Culture, and Politics in the Middle East). Syracuse University Press. p. 278. ISBN 978-0-815-63179-8.
- ‘Abdu’l-Bahá's Journey West: The Course of Human Solidarity. Editor. Palgrave Macmillan, 2013. ISBN 978-1-137-03200-3
- #iranelection: Hashtag Solidarity and the Transformation of Online Life. Stanford University Press, 2015. Winner of Abu Aardvark 2015 Middle East Book Award.
- Mottahedeh, Negar (2008). Nationalizing Sense Perception. Duke University Press. ISBN 978-0-8223-8119-8.
- After Oil, 2016 (Contributing author)
- Mottahedeh, Negar (2013). "Representations: Metaphors of the Female Body: Overview". In Suad, Joseph (ed.). Encyclopedia of Women and Islamic Cultures. Leiden, The Netherlands: Brill. ISBN 978-90-04-13247-4.
- Negar, Mottahedeh (2019). Whisper Tapes: Kate Millett in Iran. Stanford Briefs. p. 88. ISBN 978-1-503-60986-0., translated into Persian, May 2026, as نوارهای زمزمه: کیت میلت در ایران. For background, see this piece on the French women who traveled with Kate Millet to Iran: "Planetarity: The Anti-disciplinary Object of Iranian Studies" (N. Mottahedeh, Global 1979 Geographies and Histories of the Iranian Revolution, pp. 389–410).

=== Articles ===
- "Iranian Cinema in the Twentieth Century: A Sense History." Iranian Studies 42:4 (September 2009).
- Mottahedeh, Negar; Saljoughi, Sara (2012). "Guest Editors' Introduction: Rethinking Gender in Contemporary Iranian Art and Cinema". Iranian Studies. 45 (4): 499–502. doi:10.1080/00210862.2012.673828. ISSN 0021-0862. JSTOR 23266443.
- Mottahedeh, Negar; McLarney, Ellen (2020). "Soundscapes of the Iranian Revolution: Interview with Negar Mottahedeh". Journal of Middle East Women's Studies. 16 (2): 277–234. ISSN 1558-9579.
- “Collection and Recollection: on studying the early history of the motion pictures in Iran." Early Popular Visual Culture (June, 2008).
- Mottahedeh, Negar (2005). "Karbala Drag Kings and Queens". TDR. 49 (4): 73–85. doi:10.1162/105420405774762989. ISSN 1054-2043. JSTOR 4488683.
- "Ruptured Spaces, Effective Histories: Tahirih in History: Perspective on Qurrat al-‘Ayn from East and West. Studies in the Babi and Baháʼí Religions, vol. 16 (Fall, 2004), online at Baháʼí Library Online.
- "Off the Grid: Reading Iranian Memoirs in Our Time of Total War." Middle East Research and Information Project (September 2004), online at merip.org.
- "Life is Color! Towards a transnational feminist analysis of Mohsen Makhmalbaf's Gabbeh." Special issue on film, in Feminism Signs (2004).
- "Where are Kiarostami's Women?" On the Foreignness of Film (2004).
- Mottahedeh, Negar (1999). "Resurrection, Return, Reform: Ta'ziyeh as Model for Early Babi Historiography". Iranian Studies. 32 (3): 387–399. doi:10.1080/00210869908701962. ISSN 0021-0862. JSTOR 4311269.
- "Bahram Bayza`i's Maybe Some Other Time: The un-Present-able Iran." Camera Obscura: Feminism, Culture and Media Studies, 43 (2000), pp. 163–191.
- Mottahedeh, Negar (2010). "The Making of a Rebel Filmmaker: Makhmalbaf at Large (review)". Cinema Journal. 49 (2): 167–169. doi:10.1353/cj.0.0193.
- "Images of Women: [08] Middle East." In Angharad N. Valdivia, ed., The Routledge International Encyclopedia of Women's Studies (2000).
- "Bahram Bayza`i: Filmography." in Life and Art: the New Iranian Cinema (1999), pp 74–82. Translated into Persian as Zindihgi va honar: sinama-yi novin-i Iran, trans. by Parvanih Faridi and Omid Rawhani (Tehran, 1379), pp. 101–110,
- "The Mutilated Body of the Modern Nation." Comparative Studies of South Asia, Africa and the Middle East 18:2 (1998), pp. 38–50, online at Baháʼí Library Online.
- Mottahedeh, Negar (2018). "Nahid Siamdoust, Soundtrack of the Revolution: The Politics of Music in Iran, Stanford Studies in Middle Eastern and Islamic Societies and Cultures". International Journal of Middle East Studies. 5: 348–349. doi:10.1017/S002074381800034X. ISSN 1471-6380.
- "Scheduled For Judgment Day: The Ta’ziyeh Performance in Qajar Persia and Walter Benjamin’s Dramatic Vision of History." Theatre InSight 8:1 (Spring, 1997), pp. 12–20.
- "Ruptured Spaces and Effective Histories: The Unveiling of the Babi Poetess Qurrat al-’Ayn-Tahirih in the Gardens of Badasht." First published in UCLA Historical Journal 17 (1997): 59-81, then in H-Bahai's Occasional Papers in Shaykhi, Babi and Baha'i Studies, 2:2 (February, 1998) — a refereed on-line journal — at h-net.org.
- Mottahedeh, Negar (2016). "'Le Vent Nous Portera': Of lovers possessed, of times entangled and bodies carried away". Asian Cinema. 27 (2): 177–188. doi:10.1386/ac.27.2.177_1. ISSN 1059-440X.
- Mottahedeh, N. (2016). One Light: Cinema and Islamic Spirituality (Accepted). In B. Lawrence & V. Cornell (Eds.), Whiley-Blackwell Companion to Islamic Spirituality.
- Mottahedeh, N. (2016). Crude Extractions: the Voice in Iranian Cinema (Accepted). In T. Whittaker & S. Wright (Eds.), Locating the Voice in Film.
- Mottahedeh, Negar (2018). "Reel Evil". Cinema Journal. 57 (4): 146–150. doi:10.1353/cj.2018.0060. ISSN 0009-7101. JSTOR 26585580.
- Mottahedeh, Negar; McLarney, Ellen (2020). "Images of an Undocumented Revolution" (PDF). Journal of Middle East Women's Studies. 16 (2): 235–243. doi:10.1215/15525864-8238272. ISSN 1558-9579.
- Planetarity Cambridge University Press, 2021. doi:10.1017/9781108979658.020
- Mottahedeh, N. (2023). Not Feminism, Human Solidarity: Qurrat al-'Ayn Tahirih in Early Historical Drama. Hawwa, 21(4), 410–432. https://doi.org/10.1163/15692086-12341407

=== Journalism ===
- "Using 'The Selfie' To Protest," NPR's The State of Things (December 21, 2016)
- "Iranian Professor: Trump Travel Ban Ensnares Academics Who Are Uplifting America," Observer (February 5, 2017)
- "As Vandals Trash a Jewish Cemetery, an Iranian Recalls the Persecution of the Baháʼí," Observer (February 22, 2017)
- "Memes, gifs and political power — as lines blur between the online and offline worlds," The Hill (July 10, 2017)
- Mottahedeh, Negar (August 16, 2017). "My Instagram Hacker Changed My Life". Wired.
- "Befriending the person who hacked your Instagram," NPR's Marketplace Tech, host Molly Wood (August 24, 2017)

=== Other ===
- Co-curated with Hamid Dabashi and La Frances Hui the Asia Society's tribute to the silenced Iranian director Jafar Panahi (February 25-March 11, 2011).
- "Where the Future Nests: 19th Century Babi and Bahai Photography." Lecture hosted by the Ezri Center for Iran & Persian Gulf Studies at the University of Haifa (April 23, 2009); revised for the "Intellectual Othering and the Bahai Question in Iran" in Toronto (July 2, 2011). Archived at Baháʼí Library Online.
- "Negative Refractions: Recent feminist writing on the Middle East." Women's Studies Quarterly (Winter 2006).
- Review of "Abbas Kiarostami" by Mehrnaz Saeed-Vafa and Jonathan Rosenbaum". Historical Journal of Film, Radio and Television 29:3 (August 2009).
- Review of "The Making of a Rebel Filmmaker: Makhmalbaf at Large by Hamid Dabashi". (Winter 2009).
- Review of Ed. Richard Tapper, "The New Iranian Cinema: Politics, Representation, and Identity". Iranian Studies 38:2 (June 2005), pp. 341–344.
- Review of "Iranian Islam: The Concept of the Individual by Nader Ahmadi and Fereshteh Ahmadi". Iranian Studies 33:1-2 (2005).
- Review of Hamid Naficy, "An Accented Cinema: Exilic and Diasporic Filmmaking". Iranian Studies 36:3 (2004).

== Awards ==
- Persian Heritage Foundation "Latifeh Yarshater Award" for Representing the Unpresentable (2008)
- Persian Heritage Foundation Book Award for Displaced Allegories (2008)
- Washington Post's Abu Aardvark Middle East Book Award (2015) for #iranelection: Hashtag Solidarity and the Transformation of Online Life.
