= Nematollah Salehi Najafabadi =

Iranian Ayatollah (1923-2006)

Personal life
- Born: 1923/24
- Died: 2006 Tehran

Religious life
- Religion: Twelver Shi'ism Islam

Ayatollah Nematollah Salehi Najafabadi (1923/24 in Najafabad, Isfahan province – 2006 in Tehran) was an Iranian cleric, scholar and proponent of Islamic Unity, who spent most years after the Iranian revolution of 1979 under house arrest.

The Special Court for the Clergy prohibited him from teaching and receiving students. His writings were censored.

== Background ==
Nematollah Salehi Najafabadi was born in 1923/24 and studied in Isfahan with Rahim Arbab and Mohammad Hasan Alem Najafabadi. Later he continued his studies in Qom with Tabatabai and Boroujerdi.

He wrote Shahid-e Javid (The Eternal Martyr), which he started to conceive in 1961. It radically reinterpreted early Shia history. Despite the author's house arrest, it is in its fifth printing in Iran. Many books have been published in response to it, including by such distinguished ulama as Ayatollah Motahari (d. 1979) and Ayatollah Mohammad-Reza Golpaygani (d. 1993).

In his essay Vahdat-e Islami, Najafabadi advocates steps towards Shia and Sunni ecumenism. He believes Shia ulama should be permitted to follow Sunni fiqh in certain areas and vice versa. The article was banned by the Special Court for the Clergy.

He died in Tehran in 2006.

== Students ==
Among those present for his lessons were Mahdavi Kani, Hashemi Rafsanjani, Mohammadi Gilani, mahfouzi, Hassan Sanei, Lahooti Eshkevari, Rabbani Amlashi, Mousavi Yazdi, Emami Kashani, Mohammad Ali kousha. Hashemi Rafsanjani said in introducing his professors:

We, of course, but much more the teachers who influenced us one of Ayatollah Hossein Ali Montazeri were of course at higher levels and in the premises of late Saeedi and Professors who are alive: Ayatollah Salehi Najaf-Abadi, Mr Meshkini, Mr. Mujahid, Mr. Soltani and Mr. fakoori that they were truly pious and pure men.

In the summer of 2006 Mohammad Ali Kousha student and close friend of Salehi Najafabad, along with Mohsen kadivar and Mohammad ali Ayazi action for the Foundation for the Publication of Ayatollah Salehi Najafabadi was under Saleh Foundation.

== Works and Publications ==
(in Persian)

- Shahid-e Javid (The Eternal Martyr) (Qom 1968)
- Tautee-ye Shah bar zedde Imam Khomeini (The Shah's Conspiracy against Khomeini) (1984)
- Vahdat-e Islami (Islamic Unity) (article, 1985)
- hokoumate salehan (righteous government) (Qom 1983)
- Najafabadi, Nematollah Salehi (2003). Jahad Dar Eslam. Nashr-e Ney. p. 326. ISBN 978-9-643-12702-2.
- Najafabadi, Nematollah Salehi (2009). Religious Extremism: Intellectual and Doctrinal Deviance in Islam. Organization for the Advancement of Islamic Knowledge and Humanitarian Services. p. 186. ISBN 978-0-968-08684-1.

== See also ==
- Ayatollah Montazeri
- Vilayat-e Faqih (disambiguation)
