= Moses and the Shepherd =

Moses and the Shepherd may refer to:

- Moses and the Shepherd (album), by Shahram Nazeri
- Moses and the Shepherd (story), from the 13th-century work Masnavi, by the poet Rumi
