= List of stories in the Masnavi =

The below list gives the titles of the stories in Rumi's Masnavi-e-Ma'navi, as it appears in Reynold A. Nicholson's translation.

== Book I ==
- Preface (in prose)
- Proem
- The King and the Handmaiden
- The Greengrocer and the Parrot
- The Jewish King whose Vizier contrived a plot against the Christians
- The Caliph and Laylá
- The description of Mohammed in the Gospel
- Another Jewish King who persecuted the Christians
- The punishment inflicted on a man who scoffed at Mohammed
- The Wind which destroyed the people of ‘Ad .
- The Lion and the Beasts of chase
- Azrael and the man who took refuge with Solomon
- Solomon and the Hoopoe
- The Fall of Adam
- The Holy War against the Flesh
- The Caliph ‘Umar and the Ambassador
- How Adam acknowledged, while Iblis denied, responsibility for sin
- “And He is with you, wheresoever you be”
- “Let him who desires to sit with God sit with the Súfís”
- The Merchant and the Parrot which gave him a message to the parrots of India
- The Spiritual Birds that are Divine Intelligences
- Commentary on a saying of Faridu’ddín ‘Attár .
- The respect paid to Moses by Pharaoh’s magicians
- Commentary on a saying of Saná’í, and a Discourse on a Tradition of the Prophet concerning the jealousy of God
- The harmfulness of being honoured by the people
- “Whatsoever God wills cometh to pass”
- The Story of the Harper
- Explanation of a Tradition of the Prophet concerning Divine inspiration
- A Story of ‘A’isha and the Prophet
- Commentary on a verse of Saná’i
- “Take advantage of the coolness of the spring season”
- The Moaning Pillar
- A miracle performed by the Prophet in the presence of Abú Jahl
- The Prodigal for whom the angels pray
- The munificent Caliph
- The Arab of the Desert and his Wife
- False saints
- The power of Faith
- Light and colour
- Explanation of the Tradition that women prevail over the wise man, while the ignorant man prevails over them
- The mystery of Moses and Pharaoh
- “He has lost this life and the life to come”
- The prophet Sálih and the people of Thamúd
- The barrier between the righteous and the wicked
- What is meat to the saint is poison to the disciple
- The Divine Bounty and those who beg for it
- The two kinds of “poor”
- The World's lovers
- The proverb, “If you commit fornication, commit it with a free woman, and if you steal, steal a pearl”
- The Grammarian and the Boatman
- The Spiritual Guide
- The Prophet's injunction to ‘Alí
- The man of Qazwín who wanted to have a lion tattooed on his shoulder
- The wolf and the fox who went to hunt with the Lion .
- The man who knocked at his friend’s door and, on being asked who he was, answered, “‘Tis I”
- Description of Unification
- Noah as the God-man
- Why the Súfís who know God are seated in front of kings
- Joseph and the guest-friend who could find no suitable gift for him except a mirror
- Mohammed and the scribe who wrote down the Qur'anic Revelations
- Bal’am son of Bá’úr
- Hárút and Márút
- The deaf man and his sick neighbour
- Iblis the originator of analogical reasoning applied to the Word of God
- Mystical experiences must be kept hidden from the vulgar
- The contention between the Greek and Chinese artists
- The Vision of Zayd
- Luqmán and his fellow-servants
- The conflagration in Medina in the days of the Caliph 'Umar
- 'Alí and the infidel who spat in his face
- 'Alí and his murderer
- The self-conceit shown by Adam towards Iblís
- The unworldliness of the Prophet

== Book II ==
- Preface (in prose)
- Proem
- The Caliph ‘Umar and the man who thought he saw the new moon
- The fool who entreated Jesus to bring some bones to life
- The Sufi who enjoined the servant to take care of his ass
- The King and his lost falcon
- Shaykh Ahmad son of Khizrúya and his creditors
- The answer of an ascetic who was warned not to weep, lest he should become blind
- The peasant who stroked a lion in the dark
- The Súfis who sold the traveller’s ass
- The greedy insolvent
- Parable for those who say “if”
- The man who killed his mother because he suspected her of adultery
- The King and his two slaves
- The King's retainers who envied his favourite slave
- The falcon amongst the owls
- The thirsty man who threw bricks into the water
- The man who planted a thornbush in the road and delayed to uproot it
- Dhu'l-Nún and the friends who came to visit him in the mad-house
- The sagacity of Luqmán
- The reverence of Bilqís for the message of Solomon which was brought to her by the hoopoe
- The philosopher who showed disbelief in the Qur’án
- Moses and the shepherd
- The Amír and the sleeping man into whose mouth a snake had crept
- The fool who trusted the bear
- The blind beggar who said, “I have two blindnesses”
- Moses and the worshipper of the golden calf
- Galen and the madman
- The cause of a bird's flying and feeding with a bird that is not of its own kind
- Mohammed's visit to the sick Companion
- The gardener who separated three friends in order to chastise them singly
- Báyazíd and the Shaykh who said, “I am the Ka’ba”
- The novice who built a new house
- Dalqak and the Sayyid-i Ajall
- The Saint who rode a cock-horse
- The dog and the blind mendicant
- The Police Inspector and the drunken man
- Iblís and Mu’áwiya
- The Cadi who wept whilst he was being installed
- The bitter grief of a man who missed the congregational prayers
- The thief who escaped because his accomplice gave a false alarm
- The Hypocrites and the Mosque of Opposition
- The true believer's stray camel
- The four Indians who lost their prayers
- The Ghuzz Turcomans and the two villagers
- The self-conceit and ingratitude shown by the worldly towards the prophets and saints
- The old man who complained to the doctor
- Júhí and the child
- The boy who was afraid of an effeminate man
- The archer and the horseman
- The Arab of the desert and the philosopher
- The miracles of Ibráhim son of Adham
- The beginning of the gnostic's illumination
- The stranger who reviled the Shaykh
- The man who declared that God would not punish his sins, and Shu’ayb's answer to him
- The answer of the Prophet to ‘A’isha, who said that he performed the ritual prayer in unclean places
- The mouse and the camel
- The miracles of a dervish who was accused of theft
- The garrulous, greedy, and somnolent Súfí, and his reply to the Shaykh who enjoined him to observe moderation
- The nature of intuitive knowledge
- John the Baptist and Jesus
- Mute eloquence
- The search for the Tree of Life
- How four persons quarrelled about grapes, which were known to each of them by a different name
- How Mohammed established unity amongst the Ansár
- Solomon and the birds
- The ducklings that were fostered by a hen
- The miracles wrought by an ascetic in the desert

== Book III ==
- Preface (in prose)
- Proem
- The Travellers who ate the young Elephant
- Bilál’s mispronunciation in chanting the call to prayer
- Moses instructed by God how he should pray
- The response to sincere prayer
- The Countryman and the Townsman
- The people of Sabá and the Prophets
- How Jesus came forth from his cell and healed the sick
- The Falcon and the Ducks
- The people of Zarwán
- Majnún and Laylá’s dog
- The Jackal that fell into the dyeing-vat and pretended to be a Peacock
- The Braggart who pretended that he had dined well
- Bal’am the son of Bá’úr
- “And thou wilt surely know them in the perversion of their speech”
- Hárút and Márút
- Pharaoh's dream of the coming of Moses
- The Mughal and the Egyptians
- The conception and birth of Moses
- The Snake-catcher and the frozen Snake
- Pharaoh and Moses
- The two Magicians who summoned their father from the grave
- Comparison of the Qur’án to the rod of Moses
- The Elephant in the dark house
- Noah and Canaan
- Infidelity and Predestination
- The Barber and the Man with grizzled hair
- The answer of Zayd to his assailant
- The Companions of the Prophet and the Qur’án
- The Lover who read a love-letter in the presence of his Beloved
- The Poor Man who prayed that he might gain a lawful livelihood without work
- Knowledge and Opinion
- The Teacher who fancied he was ill
- The Dervish who broke his vow
- The far-seeing Goldsmith
- The Magicians whom Pharaoh threatened to punish
- The complaint of the Mule to the Camel
- The Ass of ‘Uzayr
- The Shaykh who showed no grief at the death of his sons
- The Blind Man who regained his sight when he read the Qur’án
- The patience of Luqmán
- Buhlúl and the Dervish
- The Visions and Miracles of Daqúqi
- Moses and Khizr
- The flight of Jesus from the Fool
- The Children's Tale of the Three Worldlings
- The Hares and the Elephant
- Noah and the building of the Ark
- The Thief who said he was beating a Drum
- The meaning of Prudence
- The Vow made by the Dogs every winter
- The Divine Providence manifested in the creation of Hell
- Kings compared to the Báb-i Saghír at Jerusalem
- The Súfí who fell into ecstasy on seeing an empty food-wallet
- Jacob's love for Joseph
- The Amir and the Slave who took delight in the ritual Prayer
- The Faith of the Worldly
- Hidden Saints
- Anas and the Prophet's napkin
- How the Prophet saved a caravan of Arabs from death in the Desert
- Miracles wrought by the Prophet on the same occasion
- Need and distress call forth the Bounty of God
- The Babe that bore witness to the Prophet
- The Eagle that carried off the Prophet's boot
- The Man who asked Moses to teach him the language of Beasts and Birds
- The Woman whose twenty children all died in infancy
- Why Hamza in his old age refused to protect himself with a coat of mail
- The advantages of Deliberation
- The death of Bilál
- The World and the Body
- Statute and Analogy
- The reverence due to the Shaykhs from their disciples
- Conventional and intuitive knowledge
- Faná and Baqá
- The Wakíl of Bukhárá and his Master
- The appearance of the Holy Spirit in human shape to Mary, the Mother of Jesus
- The most beautiful City
- The Lover in the haunted Mosque
- The worldliness of Galen
- How Satan deceived the Quraysh
- The Boy who beat a tomtom in order to scare a Camel on which they were beating a drum
- Comparison of the true Believer suffering tribulation to peas being boiled in a pot
- The Mathnawí and its critics
- The outer and inner sense of the Qur’án
- Why the Saints take refuge in mountains and caves
- How the mountains joined in the song of David
- The Foal that would not drink
- The cry of the Devil
- How each element in the Body is drawn to its original source, and the Soul likewise
- The Prophet and the Captives
- The Gnat and the Wind in the presence of Solomon
- The perfidious Lover

== Book IV ==
- Preface (in prose)
- Proem
- The perfidious Lover (continued)
- The Preacher who prayed for the wicked
- The answer of Jesus to the question, “What is the hardest thing to bear?”
- The Súfí who caught his wife with a strange man
- The Names of God
- Comparison of the World to a bath-stove
- The Tanner who fainted on smelling otto and musk
- The Jew who tempted ‘Alí
- The building of the Farther Mosque (the Temple of Solomon)
- “The Faithful are naught but brothers”
- The unspoken Sermon of the Caliph ‘Uthmán
- Man the Macrocosm
- Comparison of the Prophet and the Moslem saints to the Ark of Noah
- Solomon and Bilqís
- The Miracles of Shaykh ‘Abdullah Maghribí
- The Druggist and the Clay-eater
- The Dervish and the Carrier of firewood
- Ibráhím ibn Adham and his abandonment of his Kingdom
- The thirsty man who climbed a walnut-tree and dropped walnuts into the water
- Halíma and the infant Mohammed
- The Worldly and the Spiritual
- The Poet and the two Viziers
- Pharaoh and Hámán
- The Demon who sat on the throne of Solomon
- How Cain learned the grave-digger’s trade
- The Súfi who contemplated the beauty of the Garden in his own heart
- Worldly knowledge and power a dangerous weapon in the hands of the wicked
- “O thou that wrappest thyself”
- The Slave whose allowance was reduced
- Man half angel and half beast
- Majnún and his she-camel
- The Divine and the Thief who stole his turban
- The World's enticement and warning
- The food of the Saints
- Death the touchstone of pretension
- The hypocritical Encomiast
- The divine Physicians
- How Abd Yazíd (Báyazíd) Bistámí predicted the birth of Abu‘l-Hasan Kharraqáni
- How the wind blew perversely against Solomon
- Abu’l-Hasan at the tomb of Abú Yazíd
- The Man who took counsel with his enemy
- The Prophet's appointment of a Young Man of Hudhayl to command the army
- The Ecstasy of Báyazíd
- The wise, the half-wise, and the foolish
- The Three Fishes
- The ablutionary Prayers
- The Man who failed to profit by the wise counsels of a Bird
- Moses and Pharaoh as types of Reason and Imagination
- The spiritual vision in which all the senses become one
- Moses and Pharaoh
- The World's assault on the Unseen
- The Purification of the Heart
- “I was a Hidden Treasure”
- “Speak ye unto men according to the measure of their understandings
- The Prophet’s promise of Paradise to ‘Ukkásha
- The royal Falcon and the Old Woman
- ‘Alí’s advice to the Mother whose child was in danger of falling from the top of the water-spout
- Like attracts like
- The Prophet and the Arab Chiefs
- Paradise and Hell are the effects of Divine Mercy and Wrath
- The Argument between the Atheist and the Mystic
- The Purpose of Creation
- Why Moses was loved by God
- The King and his Boon-companion and the Courtier who acted as intercessor
- Abraham rejects the proffered help of Gabriel
- The mystery of Life and Death
- Body and Spirit
- The Prince and the Witch of Kabúl
- The Ascetic who laughed while the people were dying of hunger
- Live in harmony with Universal Reason
- The Sons of ‘Uzayr
- “Verily, I ask pardon of God seventy times every day”
- The weakness of the discursive Reason
- Submission to the Saints
- The Mule and the Camel
- The Egyptian and the Israelite
- The Pear-tree of Illusion
- The spiritual Evolution of Man
- Divine immanence in Creation
- Dhu’l-Qarnayn and Mount Qaf
- The Ant that saw the pen writing
- The Prophet's vision of Gabriel in his real form

== Book V ==
- Preface (in prose)
- Proem
- Parable of the Four Birds
- Description of the Duck
- The Prophet and the Greedy Infidel
- The Light which is the Food of the Spirit
- Description of the Peacock
- Diversity of Intelligences
- The Arab of the Desert and his Dog
- The Sage and the Peacock
- “No monkery in Islam”
- Description of the Crow
- The Gazelle in the Donkey-stable
- Muammad Khwárizmsháh and the people of Sabzawár
- Description of the Cock
- “The Lowest of the Low”
- The two Worlds
- The value of Works
- “And He is with you”
- The Man who claimed to be a Prophet
- The Devoted Lover
- The Disciple who imitated the Shaykh
- The Maidservant and the Ass
- Parable of the Parrot which is taught to speak by seeing its image in a mirror
- The Puppies that barked before they were born
- The People of Zarwán
- The Creation of Adam
- The illusion of causes
- Death and Resurrection
- The infinite mercy of God
- The Story of Ayáz
- Laylá and Majnún
- The Ascetic and his jealous Wife
- The repentance of Nasúh
- The Fox and the Ass
- The Ass that envied the Arab horses
- The Ascetic who made trial of his trust in God
- Parable of the Camel
- The effeminate Youth
- The Man who was afraid of being taken for an Ass
- Shaykh Muhammad Sar-razí of Ghazna
- The Disciple in dreadof hunger
- The Cow in the green Island
- The Christian ascetic who went about with a lamp in the day-time
- Debate between a Moslem and a Magian on the subject of free-will
- The Dervish who reproached God
- The beauty of Laylá
- A story of Júhí
- The Infidel and Báyazíd
- The Muezzin with the harsh voice
- The Cat and the Meat
- The Amír and the Ascetic
- Ziyá-yi Dalq and his Brother
- Dalqak's game of Chess with the Sháh of Tirmid
- The Prophet on Mount Hirá
- The World that is living, speaking, and hearing
- The Guest who took offence and departed
- A Father's advice to his married Daughter
- The cowardly Súfí
- ‘Iyádí and the Greater Warfare
- The Man who tormented his Carnal Soul
- The Caliph and the Captain
- The Magicians of Pharaoh

== Book VI ==
- Preface (in prose)
- Proem
- The Bird on the City-wall
- The temptation of Free-will
- The Hindu Slave and his Master’s daughter
- The Thief who put out the light
- The Story of Ayáz (continued)
- The Fowler and the Bird
- The Man whose Ram was stolen
- The Watchman who cried out after the Robbers had gone
- The Lover who fell asleep
- The Turkish Amír and the Minstrel
- ‘A’isha and the Blind Man
- “Die before ye die”
- A Poet's rebuke to the Shí’ites of Aleppo
- Parable of the Ant
- The Man who gave the drum-call for breakfast at midnight
- The Story of Bilál
- The Story of Hilál
- The Horse that went backward
- Mohammed and Jesus
- The ugly old Hag who wanted a Husband
- The Dervish and the Man of Gílán
- The Beggar and the House where nothing could be got
- The Man who was desperately ill, and the Story of the Súfi and the Cadi
- Sultan Mahmud and the Hindú Boy
- The Turk and the Tailor
- The Fakir and the Hidden Treasure
- Shaykh Abu ‘l-Hasan Kharraqáni and his Disciple
- Man the vicegerent of God
- The Three Travellers and the sweetmeat
- The Camel, the Ox, and the Ram
- Dalqak and the King of Tirmid
- The Mouse and the Frog
- Sultan Mahmúd and the Night-thieves
- The Sea-cow and the Pearl
- ‘Abdu ‘l-Ghawth and the Peris
- The insolvent Dervish and the Police Inspector of Tabríz
- Ja’far-i Tayyár's irresistible attack on a fortress
- Parable of the man who sees double
- The Khwárizmsháh and the beautiful Horse
- The imprisonment of Joseph
- The Three Princes who fell in love with the portrait of the Princess of China
- The Sadr-i Jahán of Bukhárá and the Jurist
- Story of two Brothers
- The King who forced a learned Doctor to drink wine with him
- Imra’u ‘l-Qays and the King of Tabúk
- The Man who dreamed of a Hidden Treasure
- The Cadi and the Wife of Júhí
- The Prophet and ‘Alí
- Hell and the true Believer
- The Story of Nimrod
- The miracles of Shaybán Rá’í
- The Man who left his property to the laziest of his three Sons
- Parable of the Child and the Bogle
