= Jawid Mojaddedi =

Afghan researcher and professor

Jawid Mojaddedi is an Afghan researcher and professor.

== Early life ==
Mojaddedi was born in Kabul, Afghanistan. At age five, along with his mother and brother, he moved to Great Britain.

During the late 1980s and 1990s, Jawid Mojaddedi attended University of Manchester, where he earned his BA and PhD in Middle Eastern Studies.

== Career ==
He graduated from the University of Manchester. He then worked as a full-time faculty member of the Department of Middle Eastern Studies, where he taught Arabic and Islamic Studies.

In 1998, Jawid moved from Great Britain to the United States. He worked at Columbia University for two years as an editor of Encyclopædia Iranica. He began teaching at Rutgers University in 2003. He has served as chair of the Department of Religion there and as Director of the Center for Middle Eastern Studies.

== Works ==
Mojaddedi is a scholar of Sufism whose most recent work has focused on the poet and Sufi Master Rumi. His published books include a complete and unabridged verse translation of Rumi's longest poem, known as the Masnavi, into simple English. The Masnavi: Book One was published in 2004 and was awarded the Lois Roth Prize for excellence in translation of Persian literature by the American Institute of Iranian Studies. He continued with The Masnavi: Book Two in 2007, The Masnavi: Book Three in 2013, The Masnavi: Book Four in 2017, The Masnavi: Book Five in 2022, and The Masnavi: Book Six in 2025 (awarded the Lois Roth Prize in 2026). All six volumes were published as Oxford World's Classics Editions. This project has been supported by a literature translation fellowship from the National Endowment for the Arts in 2015. Mojaddedi was also awarded a fellowship from the National Endowment for the Humanities in 2018 to support the progress of this project.

Mojaddedi's analytical study, Beyond Dogma: Rumi's Teachings on Friendship with God and Early Sufi Theories, was published by Oxford University Press in 2012.

== Bibliography ==
- The Biographical Tradition in Sufism: The Tabaqat Genre from Al-Sulami to Jami (2001)
- Beyond Dogma: Rumi's Teachings on Friendship with God and Early Sufi Theories (2012)

=== The Masnavi (Oxford World's Classics) ===
1. The Masnavi: Book One (2004) Lois Roth Prize for excellence in translation of Persian literature by the American Institute of Iranian Studies (2005)
2. The Masnavi: Book Two (2007)
3. The Masnavi: Book Three (2013)
4. The Masnavi: Book Four (2017)
5. The Masnavi: Book Five (2022)
6. The Masnavi: Book Six (2025) Lois Roth Prize for excellence in translation of Persian literature (Poetry) by the American Institute of Iranian Studies (2026)

=== As Co-Editor ===
- Wiley Blackwell Companion to the Qur'an, 2nd Edition (2017)
- Classical Islam: A Sourcebook of Religious Literature, 2nd Edition (2012)
- Interpretation and Jurisprudence in Medieval Islam (2006)
