= Masnavi =

Persian poetic work on Sufism by Rumi

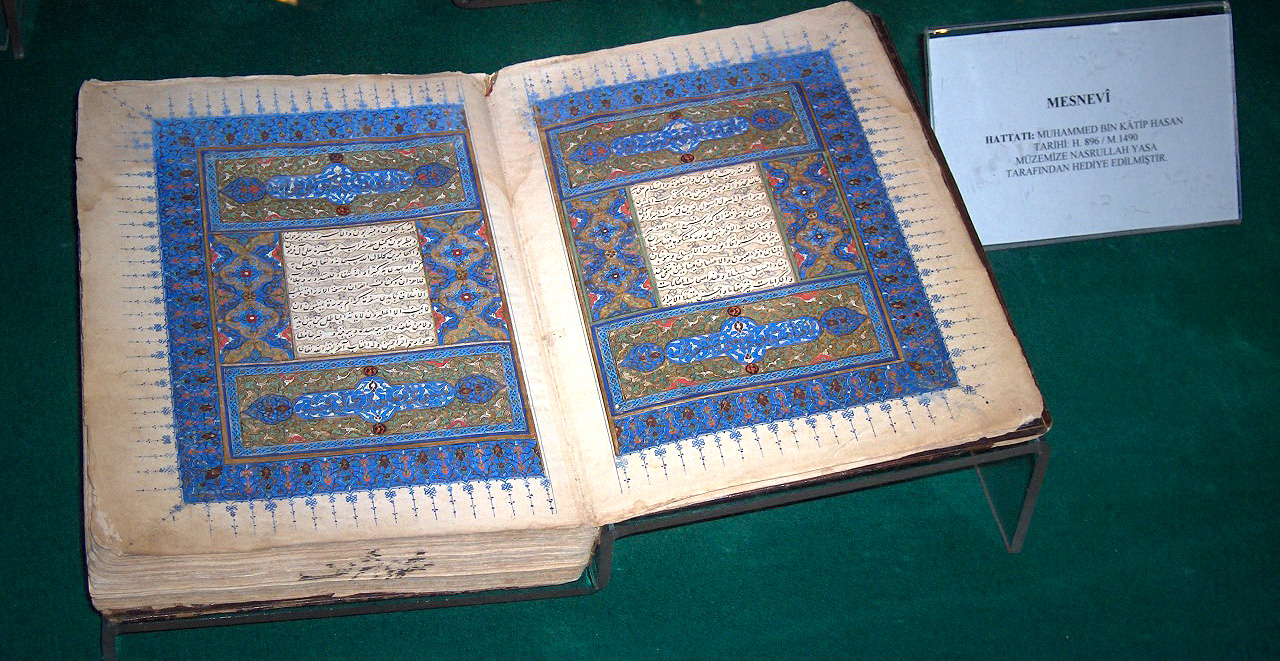
Masnavi, a calligraphic specimen from 1490, Mevlana Museum, Konya, Turkey

The Masnavi (Note: Persian: مثنوی معنوی, DMG: Mas̲navī-e maʻnavī) (Note: Also written Mathnawi, or Mathnavi) is an extensive Persian masnavi (a poetic form) written by Rumi, and one of the most influential works in the history of Sufism. It is a series of six books of poetry that together amount to around 25,000 verses or 50,000 lines.

Sometimes described as being like a "Quran in Persian", some Muslims regard the Masnavi as one of the most important works of Islamic literature, falling behind only the Quran. It has been viewed by many commentators as the greatest mystical poem in world literature. It is a spiritual text that teaches Sufis how to reach their goal of being truly in love with God.

== General description ==
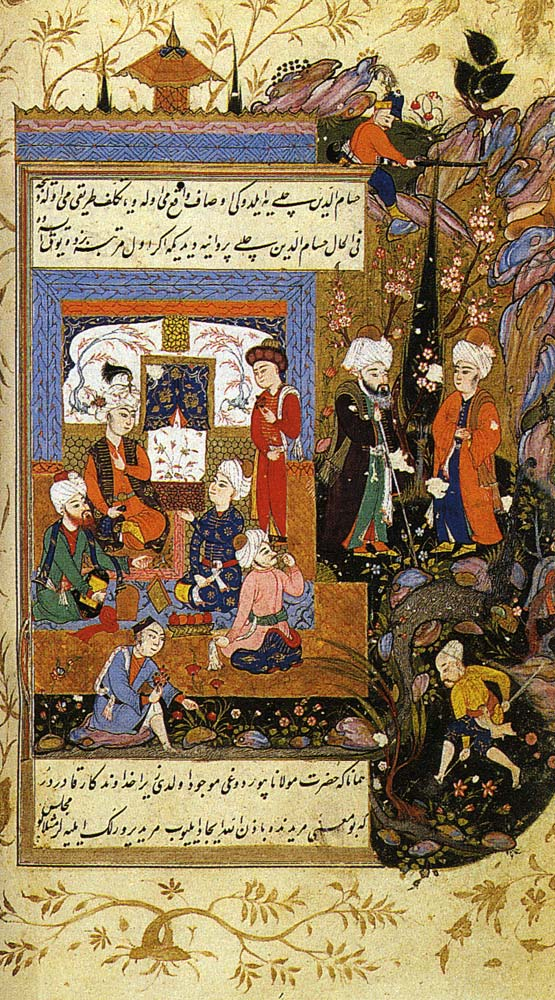
A Persian miniature depicting Jalal al-Din Rumi showing love for his disciple Hussam al-Din Chelebi (c. 1594)

The title Masnavi-ye-Ma'navi (Persian: مثنوی معنوی) means "The Spiritual Couplets". The Masnavi is a poetic collection of anecdotes and stories derived from the Quran, hadith sources, and everyday tales. Stories are told to illustrate a point and each moral is discussed in detail. It incorporates a variety of Islamic wisdom, but primarily focuses on emphasizing inward personal Sufi interpretation. In contrast to Rumi's Divan-i Shams-i Tabrizi, the Masnavi is a relatively "sober" text. It explains the various dimensions of spiritual life and practice to Sufi disciples and anyone who wishes to ponder the meaning of life.

== Creation ==
The Masnavi was started by Rumi during the final years of his life. He began dictating the first book around the age of 54 around the year 1258 and continued composing verses until his death in 1273. The sixth and final book would remain incomplete.

It is documented that Rumi began dictating the verses of the Masnavi at the request of his favourite disciple, Husam al-Din Chalabi, who observed that many of Rumi's followers dutifully read the works of Sana'i and 'Attar. Thus, Rumi began creating a work in the didactic style of Sana'i and 'Attar to complement his other poetry. These men are said to have met regularly in meetings where Rumi would deliver the verses and Chalabi would write them down and recite them back to him.

Each book consists of about 4,000 verses and contains its own prose introduction and prologue. The inconclusive ending of the sixth volume has given rise to suggestions that the work was not complete at the time of Rumi's death, as well as to claims about existence of another volume.

== Themes and narrative devices ==
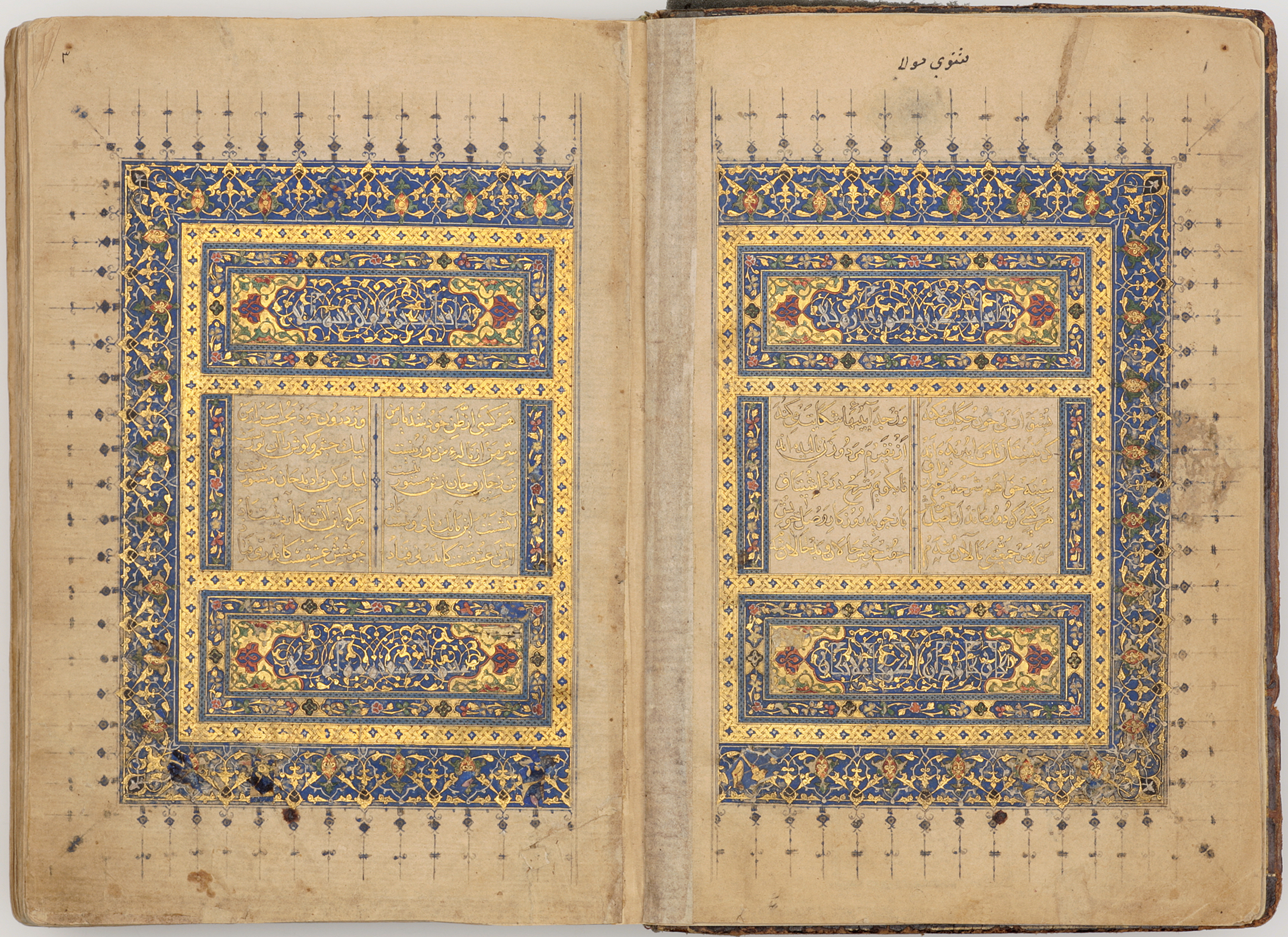
Manuscript of the Masnavi from 15th century in Iran, Khalili Collection of Islamic Art

The six books of the Masnavi can be divided into three groups of two because each pair is linked by a common theme:

- Books 1 and 2: they "are principally concerned with the nafs, the lower carnal self, and its self-deception and evil tendencies".
- Books 3 and 4: these books share the principal themes of Reason and Knowledge. These two themes are personified by Rumi in the Quranic and Biblical figure of the Prophet Moses.
- Books 5 and 6: these last two books are joined by the universal ideal that man must deny his physical earthly existence to understand God's existence.

In addition to the recurring themes presented in each book, Rumi includes multiple points of view or voices inviting the reader to fall into "imaginative enchantment". There are seven principal voices that Rumi uses in his writing:

1. The Authorial Voice – conveys the authority of a Sufi teacher and generally appears in verses addressed to You, God, or you, of all humankind.
2. The Story-telling Voice – may be interrupted by side stories that help clarify a statement, sometime taking hundreds of lines to make a point.
3. The Analogical Voice – interruptions to the flow of narration in order to explain a statement by use of analogy.
4. The Voice of Speech and Dialogue of Characters – many of the stories are told through dialogue between characters.
5. The Moral Reflection – supported by quotations from the Quran and hadith
6. The Spiritual Discourse – similar to analogical and model reflections.
7. Hiatus – Rumi occasionally questions his own verses and writes that he cannot say more because the reader would not be capable of understanding.

The Masnavi has no framed plot and includes a variety of scenes, from popular stories and scenes of the local bazaar to fables and tales from Rumi's time. It also includes quotations from the Qur'an and from hadith, accounts from the time of Mohammed.

Although there is no constant frame, style, or plot, Rumi generally follows a certain writing pattern that flows in the following order:

Problem/Theme → Complication → Resolution

== Editions and translations ==
=== Editions ===
- The Mathnawi of Jeláluʾddín Rúmí, Edited from the Oldest Manuscripts Available, with Critical Notes, Translations and Commentary, ed. and trans. by R. A. Nicholson, E. J. W. Gibb Memorial, New Series, 4, 8 vols (London: Luzac, 1924–40). Referred to by the Encyclopaedia of Islam as "the classic edition", also containing the first complete English translation of the Mathnawí. Persian text in vols 1 (books I–II), 3 (books III–IV) and 5 (books V–VI); English text in vols 2 (books I–II), 4 (books III–IV), and 6 (books V–VI); commentaries in vols 7 (books I–II) and 8 (books III–VI, with indices for vols 7–8).

=== Other English translations from Persian ===
- The Mesnevi of Mevlānā Jelālu'd-dīn er-Rūmī. Book first, together with some account of the life and acts of the Author, of his ancestors, and of his descendants, illustrated by a selection of characteristic anedocts, as collected by their historian, Mevlānā Shemsu'd-dīn Ahmed el-Eflākī el-'Arifī, translated and the poetry versified by James W. Redhouse, London: 1881. Contains the translation of the first book only.
- Masnaví-i Ma'naví, the Spiritual Couplets of Mauláná Jalálu'd-din Muhammad balkhi, translated and abridged by E. H. Whinfield, London: 1887; 1989. Abridged version from the complete poem. On-line editions at Sacred Texts and on wikisource.
- The Masnavī by Jalālu'd-din balkhi or Rūmī. Book II, translated for the first time from the Persian into prose, with a Commentary, by C. E. Wilson, London: 1910.
- Rumi, Spiritual Verses: The First Book of the Masnavi-ye Ma'nav, trans. by Alan Williams, London and New York, Penguin Classics, Penguin, xxxv + 422 pp. 2006. ISBN 9780141936994. Translated from the Persian edition of M. Este'lami, with an introduction on a reader's approach to Balkhi's writing, and with explanatory notes.
- Mathnawi Rumi: Translation with Interpretation. Vol. 6 vols. Translated by Gupta, Rajeev M. G. Huma Books. 2010. ISBN 9788191002904. Based on the Farsi Dari text circulated by the Department of Culture, Government of India, New Delhi.
- The Masnavi, translated by Jawid Mojaddedi, Oxford World's Classics Series, Oxford University Press, 2004–25. The first complete translation into English verse, from the Persian edition prepared by Mohammad Estelami, with an introduction and explanatory notes. Book I was awarded the 2004 Lois Roth Prize for excellence in translation of Persian literature by the American Institute of Iranian Studies. Book I ISBN 0-19-280438-3 (2004); book II ISBN 978-0-19-921259-0 (2007); book III ISBN 978-0-19-965203-7 (2013); book IV ISBN 978-0198783435 (2017); book V ISBN 9780192857071 (2022); book VI ISBN 9780192874283 (2025).

=== Paraphrases of English translations ===
- The Essential balkhi, translated by Coleman Barks with John Moyne, A. J. Arberry, Reynold Nicholson, San Francisco: Harper Collins, 1996 ISBN 0-06-250959-4; Edison (NJ) and New York: Castle Books, 1997. ISBN 0-7858-0871-X. Selections.
- The Illuminated balkhi, translated by Coleman Barks, Michael Green contributor, New York: Broadway Books, 1997. ISBN 0-7679-0002-2.

=== Turkish translations ===
- 'Mevlâna, Mesnevi, Veled Izbudak tarafindan tercüme edilmiş, Abdülbaki Gölpinarli tarafindan muhtelif ṣerhlerle karşilaştirilmiş ve esere bir açilma ilâve edilmiştir (Istanbul 1942–)

=== Urdu and Persian interpretations ===
- Keys of Masnavi (Kelid Masnavi), Vol. 1 and 2, Ashrafali Thanvi, interpreter: Samira Gilani, Asra Institute and Rashedin Publication, Tehran: 2018.

== See also ==
- List of stories in the Masnavi
- Mathnawi
