= Yasubedin Rastegar Jooybari =

Iranian Twelver Shi'a Marja' (born 1940)

Grand Ayatollah Yasubedin Rastegar Jooybari
- آيت الله العظمى يعسوب الدين رستگار جويبارى
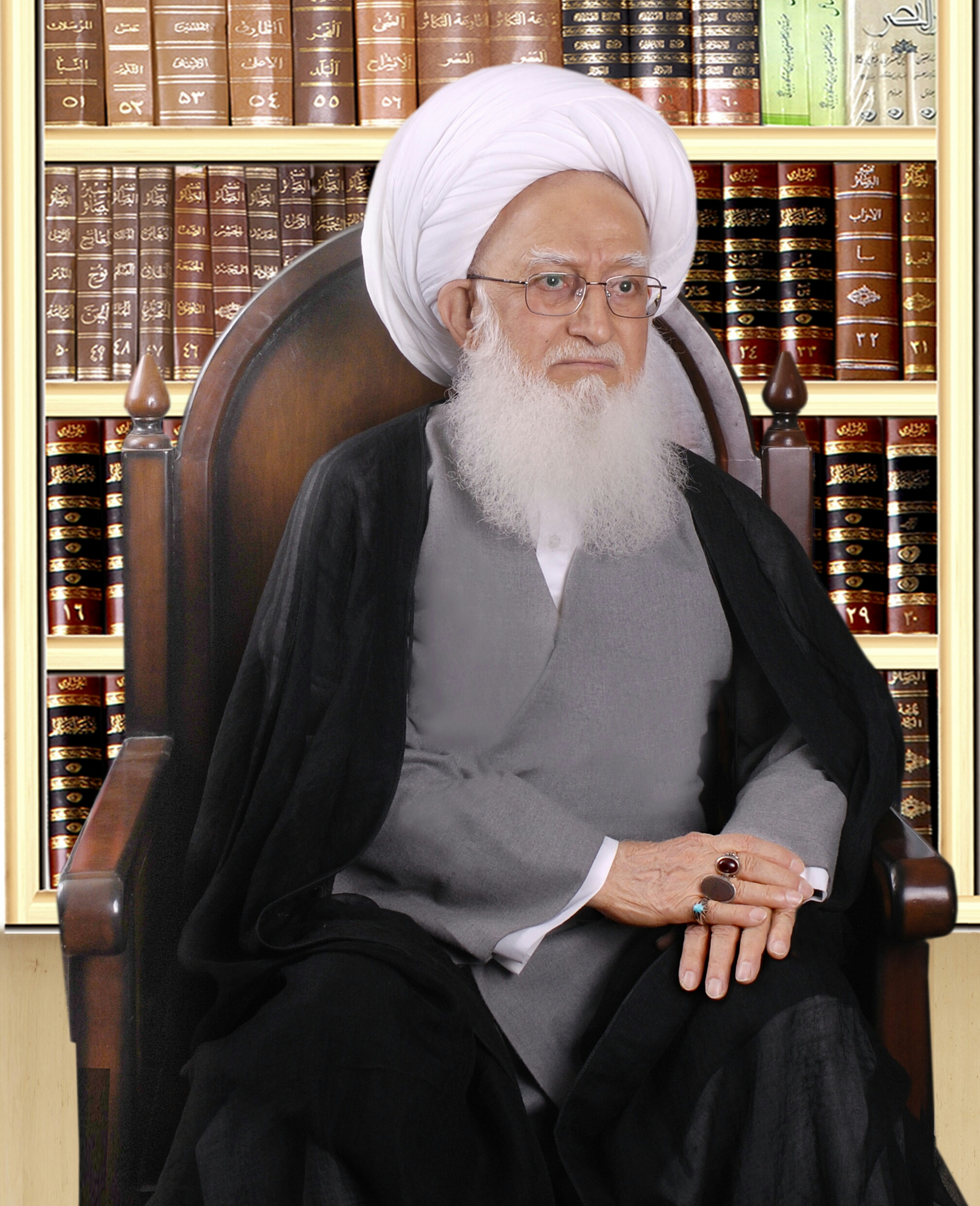
- Title: Grand Ayatollah

Personal life
- Born: 1940 (age 85–86) Juybar, Imperial State of Iran
- Website: http://www.rastegarjuybari.com

Religious life
- Religion: Usuli Twelver Shia Islam

Senior posting
- Based in: Qom, Islamic Republic of Iran
- Post: Grand Ayatollah

Grand Ayatollah Yasubeddin Rastegar Jooybari (Persian: يعسوب الدين رستگار جويباري) (born 1940) is an Iranian Twelver Shi'a Marja'.

He has studied in seminaries of Qom, Iran under Grand Ayatollah Mohammad Kazem Shariatmadari, Mohammad-Reza Golpaygani and Mirza Hashem Amoli.

He has repeatedly been arrested for his opposition against the current Iranian government, in particular Supreme Leader Ali Khamenei. Khamenei's elevation to supreme leader was challenged by him.

== Background ==
Ayatollah Yasub al-Din Rastgari, accused of criticizing government policies, has been arrested and detained several times. During his arrest in late February 1996, he was held in incommunicado detention, reportedly mainly in Tawhid and Evin Prisons in Tehran until July 1996. In August 1996, he was sentenced to three years imprisonment for having held a mourning ceremony for the late Grand Ayatollah Shariatmadari. He was sentenced by the Special Clerical Court after a summary trial on vaguely worded charges, in which he had no access to a lawyer.

Ayatollah Rastgari was released from prison in December 1996, but immediately afterwards was placed under house arrest in Qom. Rastgari was again arrested on April 27, 2004 and sentenced by the Special Clerical Court to four years in prison for “insulting Islam” and “causing schism” through his critical book on Sunni-Shia relations, The Reality of Religious Unity. He has reportedly been tortured while in detention and is held incommunicado without access to his family.

His two sons were arrested with him at the time. After publishing Rastgari's book "The Reality of Religious Unity," the book's publisher was shut down.

== Works ==
Rastegar Jooybari has written books in both Arabic and Persian. His works include:

- Tafsir al-Basa'ir. (According to the source, it is the largest Shia Quran commentary, with more than 100 volumes.)
- Miftah al-Basa'ir
- Tabsirat al-Basa'ir
- Al-Habl al-Matin min Fiqh Al Yasin
- Khulasat al-Usul
- Tabwib Anawin Nahj al-Balagha
- Hamasei az Tafsir al-Basa'ir
- Ruhaniyat va Ruhani
- Osul-e Panj-gane-ye Din-e Mobin-e Islam
- Foru'-e Dah-gane-ye Din-e Mobin-e Islam
- Abul-Fazl al-Abbas: Hami-ye Velayat va Mazhar-e Shahamat va Esteghamat
- Khaterat-e Hezar va Yek Sad va Shast Ruze
- Mazandaran Pas az Tufan-e Nuh Ta Konun
- Haghighat-e Vahdat dar Din va Hekmat-e Eid al-Zahra

== See also ==
- Special Clerical Court
- Grand Ayatollah Hossein-Ali Montazeri
- Abbas Mahfouzi

== Bibliography ==
- Amnesty International Report 13/24/97
- Network of Concerned Historians, “Ayatollah Yasub al-Din Rastgari: detained in Iran for publishing a book on Islamic history,” 20.10.2005, http://www.let.rug.nl/nch.
