= Special Clerical Court =

Iranian court system for Islamic clerics

Special Clerical Court, or Special Court for Clerics (Persian: دادگاه ویژه روحانیت, romanized: Dādgāh-e Vizheh-ye Rohāniyat), is a special Iranian judicial system for prosecuting crimes, both ordinary and political, committed by Islamic clerics and scholars. The Special Clerical Court can defrock and disbar Islamic jurists, give sentences of imprisonment, corporal punishment, execution, etc. The court functions independently of the regular Iranian judicial framework, with its own security and prison systems, "generally secret and confidential" cases, proceedings and procedures, and is accountable only to the Supreme Leader of Iran, (Ali Khamenei as of 2025). The most senior Islamic politician to be prosecuted and sentenced to prison since the Iranian Revolution has been Abdollah Nouri (Persian: عبدالله نوری) who was sentenced to five years in prison for political and religious dissent by the court in 1999.

The Court was established in the early 1980s on an ad hoc basis, subsequently phased out, and then re-established in 1987. It was fully institutionalized and endowed with a "code" in 1991 under Supreme Leader Khamenei. This code was revised and expanded in 2005. In addition to a Special Court for the Clerics, there is also a Special prosecutor for the clerics who is also appointed by the Supreme Leader and sometimes conflated with the court.

According to scholar Mirjam Künkler, "since the mid-1990s ... the court has been used increasingly as an instrument for the suppression of dissident clerics, and at times even non-clerical culprits."

== History ==
Leader of the Islamic Revolution Ayatollah Rouhollah Khomeini began to set up a "special clerical court" (SCC) to "defend Islam" and deal with those whom he called "corrupt clerics" within months of the February–March 1979 Islamic revolution in Iran.

During the early years of the Iranian revolution (the "first phase" of the court), ad hoc courts were established to deal with "criminal" acts committed by members of the clergy. These were to be "tribunals formed of three clerics and two local elders" according to Radio Farda. In 1979, clergies were punished "under charges such as dependence on the Former Royal Court, praising the Pahlavi dynasty, or the cooperation with SAVAK." In the Court's "second phase", from the beginning of 1980, it pursued its work with more discipline. In the late 1980s, the court was officially established in Qom.

Crimes prosecuted were acts aimed against the consolidation of power under Ayatollah Khomeini, as well as those committed by "black sheep" who broke traditional rules and harmed "the image of the clergy", according to Radio Farda.

As the new judicial structure of the Islamic Republic was devised and formalized, the SCC were not conceived as part of it. However, in 1987, the courts were revived by a decree of Ayatollah Khomeini in order to try an outspoken critic of the Iran–Contra affair, Mehdi Hashemi. (Note: The decree was printed in the newspaper Ettelaat of June 12, 1987.) Faced with disapproval of the unconstitutionality of the SCC, Khomeini sent a letter to the Majles of Iran in 1988, recommending that the special courts start operating within constitutional perimeters after the end of the Iran–Iraq War. (Note: Khomeini wrote in a letter addressed to the Third Majlis in 1988, ‘Many of the rulings and decrees that I have issued in the past few years were because the Islamic Revolution and the Islamic Republic were not yet on a stable footing, and also because of the special emergency conditions created by the war. However, now that the war is over and we are approaching stability, we must return to the Constitution and everything must be defined within the framework of the Constitution.’)

In 1990–91, a year after Khomeini's death, the "Special Clerical Court" was established by the new Supreme Leader, Ali Khamenei, (the "third phase"). On 7 November 1990, Mohammad Salimi was appointed the head of the Second Branch of the Special Court for the Clerics. Khamenei "significantly expanded the SCC. While the courts had hitherto functioned on the basis of no specific code, Khamenei commissioned an extraordinary ordinance of 47 articles, which was expanded in 2005. There had been one court in Tehran, he added ten other branches throughout the country (Tehran, Qom, Mashhad, Isfahan, Shiraz, Tabriz, Sari, Ahvaz, Kerman and Hamedan). "A separate prison network" was commissioned for the SCC. However, not included in all these new changes was the legalization or integration of the court into the official Iranian justice system per Khomeini's letter. The court remained under the direct jurisdiction of the Supreme Leader.

== Size and leadership ==
The cases and procedures before the SCC "are generally secret and confidential", so there is no official information about how many people the court has put on trial, what charges have been brought or sentences passed. However, according to one estimate (by Wilfried Buchta), in the year 2000 there were about 3000 prisoners in the SCC system, 6000 people in its employment. Over a twelve-year period from 1988 to 2000, about 600 people were sentenced to death and executed, 2000 clergy were defrocked and another 4000 punished with prison sentences, fines or beatings While this may seem to involve an unusually large number of offenders and punishments, the SCC chief justice Hojjat al-Islam Mohammad Salimi stated in 2006 (to the effect) that about 2000 complaints are registered with the SCC per year.

Heads of the Special Clerical Court since its inception (as of 1987) are:

- Ali Razini (1987–2012)
- Mohammad Jafar Montazeri (in office as of 2012).

Special Prosecutor of the Clerical Court since its inception (as of 1987) are:

- Ali Fallahian (1987–1990)
- Mohammad Reyshahri (1990–1998)
- Gholam-Hossein Mohseni-Eje'i (1998–2005)
- Mohammad Salimi (2005–2012)
- Ebrahim Raisi (2012–2021)
- Gholam-Hossein Mohseni-Eje'i (in office as of 2021).

The former Special Prosecutor of Clergy Court was Ebrahim Raisi, who was appointed by the supreme leader in 2012.

== The court and the law ==
=== Unique characteristics and freedoms of court ===
The clerical courts were not legalized or integrated into the official justice system, and remain under the direct jurisdiction of the Supreme Leader, and not, as all other courts in Iran, under the judiciary (i.e. the Judicial system of the Islamic Republic of Iran). This gives the clerical courts unique features that often limit the rights of the accused under the courts' jurisdiction.

- The judiciary has no authority to monitor, oversee or interfere in the affairs of the SCC. Whatever other laws may apply to legal proceedings and prison conditions elsewhere in the country do not apply to the SCC.
- Whereas the judges of other courts are appointed by the Head of the Judiciary, the judges and prosecutors of the SCC are directly appointed by the Supreme Leader. (Note: According to Article 13 § (1) of the Decree of the SCC, “[t]he SCC and its office of the Prosecutor have a jurisdiction to adjudicate all cases entrusted to it by the Supreme Leader.”)
  - It operates on a budget independent from the judiciary and not approved by the Iranian Parliament or Majles, as all budgets should be according to the constitution, but by the Expediency Discernment Council, a council appointed by and only answerable to the Supreme Leader;
  - The Supreme Court, being part of the judiciary, has no jurisdiction to review cases of the SCC. Instead, appeals are heard by another chamber of the clerical court;
  - All court proceedings are closed to the public;
  - the personnel of the SCC are not subject to any oversight such as the Judges Disciplinary Court, but subservient to the office of the Leader only;
  - The defense counsel in a trial must be chosen from designated clergy, so that the accused cannot freely choose their defense council, (article 35 of the constitution grants the accused the right to choose his or her own counsel of defense);
  - Frequently the accused are not promptly informed of the charges against them. (Article 32 of the Constitution of Iran states the defendant must be properly arraigned and the charges against him must be conveyed clearly and in writing);
  - The SCC de facto takes a different approach than the judiciary with regard to the sources of law recognized, for example considering "penal codes and the SCC ordinance as secondary in line to contemporary fatāwā", (this is in contradiction to Article 167 of the constitution, which says Islamic sources are secondary to any codified law);
  - The court runs its own security and prison systems,
- Since cases are referred to the SCC directly by the office of the Supreme Leader, in theory, the Supreme Leader is in a position to refer any case to the SCC he believes involves some sort of "crime". An example of the SCC spreading its jurisdiction is a case involving a "press offense" which the SCC took on the grounds that "the defendant is a member of the clergy", ("On December 30, 1999, 'Ali Afsahi, chief editor of the cultural and sports magazine Sinama va Varzesh, notably not a cleric, was imprisoned for four months for having 'insulted the clergy"), despite the fact that Article 168 of the Iranian Constitution states that the General Courts are the only judicial authority that has jurisdiction to review press offenses.

Iranian Conservatives have argued that Iran's Supreme Leader has the power to make new courts if he wishes on the grounds that according to Iran's Constitution, the Supreme Leader has absolute power, and so is not limited by the rules of the constitution.

=== Complaint about legitimacy ===
A number of sources have questioned the constitutionality of the SCC system. The Human Rights Activist's News Agency of Iran (NRANA) complains that the court is not mentioned in the constitution, and has not been approved of by the Islamic Consultative Assembly. Several points of the constitution indicate the court's illegality (according to the NRANA):

- Principles 19, 20 and 107 of the Constitution stipulate that: "The people of Iran, from every tribe to which they belong, enjoy equal rights, and color, race, language and such, do not bestow any privileges. The Supreme Leader in front of the law is equal to everyone else." (The HRANA then states: "Every exception in this principle needs legal clarification"—none has been given);
- according to the constitution, all offences should be investigated in the judiciary—"the country's highest legal document—"except for cases involving military courts";
- in Article 110 of the Constitution (which spells out the "Duties and Powers" of the Supreme Leader), makes no reference to courts.

Two Iranian reformist Islamic scholars who have served time in prison at the hands of the court—Mohsen Kadivar, (Note: "a research professor of Islamic studies at the Department of Religious Studies at Duke University") and Hasan Yousefi Eshkevari—also cast doubt on its legitimacy. Like the News Agency of Iran, Kadivar argues that the SCC is a violation of several articles of the IRI's constitution (articles 57, 177, 110, 172, and 19), while three other articles (57, 177, and 110) make no reference to a court functioning under the authority of the Supreme Leader—which the SCC does.

According to Kadivar, there is no doubt" the Special Clerical Court is currently and always has been "illegal". "The only way" to legalize it would be to add "a new article (amendment) to it and change "all the aforementioned articles".

Eshkevari, (who was defrocked and served several years in prison after being convicted by the Court of "spreading lies and insulting Islamic sanctities" among other charges) states the SCC "contradicts the modern law system" and "is clearly" guilty of "discrimination against the justice". Eshkevari states that the court acts very much like an inquisitional court of medieval times,—meeting in secret, doing without juries, wielding arbitrary powers, dealing severely with opponents of the ruler who may be too powerful for ordinary laws.

=== Prosecutions of institutions ===
The SCC do not only sentence criminal and dissident clerics. They also censor and confiscate works that might challenge the Supreme Leader's theological and jurisprudential authority, notably those works authored by senior Ayatollahs who oppose the velayate faqih or particular policies of the regime.

On 25 June 2000, the SCC ordered the Tehran daily Bayan, run by Hojjatoleslam Ali Akbar Mohtashemi, to cease publishing. Mohtashemi was a former interior minister and aide to President Mohammad Khatami.

In early August 1999, the Clergy court "imposed a five-year ban" on the newspaper Salam. Salam was founding in 1991 after a group of left-wing but "veteran revolutionary" pro-regime clerics, were not only banned by the conservative Guardian Council from running for the Assembly of Experts, but could find no newspaper even willing to print that news and their protest. (Despite its limited circulation and focus on influencing policy, the paper became very popular and helped elect reformist Muhammad Khatami president in 1997.) Prior to this ban, at least one of the clerics, Mohammad Mousavi Khoeiniha, publisher of Salam, was convicted for defamation and spreading false information.

=== Explanation for unique status ===
The leader of the Iranian Islamic Revolution and founder of the Islamic Republic, Ayatollah Rouhollah Khomeini, also created the religious/political concept of velāyat-e faqih or "Guardianship of the (Islamic) Jurist", which held that since government should/must be run in accordance with traditional Islamic law (sharia), the rightful ruler (until the reappearance of the "infallible Imam") would be the leading Islamic jurist (faqih, an expert in sharia) to rule over the people and nation. He (males only) would provide political "guardianship". In Iran the post of Supreme Leader was established to fulfill this role. Though Khomeini's massive popularity paved the way for this system of government, seven of the eight leading Shi'i jurists at the time (the eighth jurist was Khomeini), did not accept "the status the vali-e faqih was accorded in the 1979 Iranian constitution. (Note: Those clerics (known as marājiʿ) were Ayatollahs Abu al-Qasim al-Khu’i (or al-Khoei, d. 1992), Mohammad Kazem Shariʿat-Madari (d. 1986), Shihab al-Din Mar‘ashi-Najafi (d. 1992), Hasan Qomi (d. 2007), Mohammad Reza Golpayegani (d. 1993), Mohammad ʿAli Araki (d. 1994), Ahmad Khonsari (d. 1985))

Scholar Mirjam Künkler sees a connection between this lack of clerical support for the theological basis of the Supreme Leader, and the special powers (direct control by the Supreme Leader, being outside of the judiciary system of the Islamic Republic and the Constitution of Iran, trials that are not open to the public and do not allow the accused to choose their own defense counsel, and whose verdict cannot be appealed to the Supreme Court of Iran, etc.), of a court of law devoted just to religious clerics. If the reason for being of the Guardian ruler is based on the principle of velāyat-e faqih, and dissident cleric theologians are exactly the people who could "prove the extent to which the velāyat-e faqih is inconsistent with Shiʿi traditions and the extent to which it is a theological novelty whose primary function is to justify the exercise of authoritarian rule"; (Note: According to Mirjam Künkler, clerical dissent in the Islamic Republic "is not uniform. It takes various forms and its motivations are manifold. Some reject the concept of velāyat-e faqih altogether, while others accept it but denounce the personalization which the position has experienced both under Khomeini and Khamenei; some accept Khomeini's claim to the velāyat, while they reject Khamenei's; yet others accept the velāyat-e faqih, but disagree with particular policies, notably with the extent to which the Leader's office interferes with the administration of religious seminaries and the content of the curricula.") then:

"it is not difficult to see how the SCC, given their legal status outside any accountable, transparent check by a governmental office other than the Office of the Supreme Leader, could transform into the Supreme Leaders’ primary instrument to discipline and prosecute dissident clerics."

== Selected list of prisoners ==
Among at least somewhat prominent Clerics who have been "dealt with" in the Islamic Republic:

- Abdollah Nouri (On 27 November 1999, he was convicted by the SSC of insulting Ayatollah Khomeini, publishing anti-religious materials, disturbing public opinion, insulting officials, advocating links with the United States and sentenced to five years in prison—the most senior Islamic politician to be sentenced to prison since the Revolution;
- Ahmad Azari Qomi (arrested in 1997 after criticizing Supreme Leader Khamenei. was forcibly expelled from clerical institutes in Qom and when his term in the Guardian Council ended, his renewed candidacy in 1998 was rejected by the Guardian Council);
- Hussein-Ali Montazeri (was kept in confinement from 1997 to 2003 after criticizing the authority of Khamenei);
- Mohammad Kazem Shariatmadari (read out a show confession on television, kept under house arrest from approximately 1982 to his death in 1986);
- Yousef Saanei (offices in Qom were attacked by Basij paramilitary in December 2009—staff beaten and offices destroyed; In January 2010, he was declared by the Qom Theological Lecturers Association to no longer be a marja al-taqlid);
- Abdul-Karim Mousavi Ardebili,
- Asadollah Bayat-Zanjani
- Abdol-Hamid Masoumi-Tehrani (sentenced to prison in the Clerical Court on at least two occasions);
- Hassan Tabatabaei Qomi (kept under house arrest for some time) and passed away in confinement)
- Ahmad Khonsari
- Mohammad Rouhani
- Mohammad Sadeq Rouhani
- Mohammad al-Shirazi
- Mohammed Ridha al-Shirazi
- Mohammad Taher al‐Shubayr al‐Khaqani
- Yasubedin Rastegar Jooybari
- Hossein Kazemeyni Boroujerdi
- Mahmoud Abu al-Hasan al-Taleqani
- Sheikh Muhammad Tahir Aal Shabbir Khan
- Sheikh Muhammad Ali al-Abtahi
- Sheikh Sadiq al-Shirazi
- Abdolkarim Soroush

Have spent sometime in the prisons of the Clerical Court.

- Hadi Ghaffari, (hard-line cleric specializing in seizing expropriated properties, was convicted of embezzlement in the early 1990s),
- Ali Tehrani (broadcast anti-Islamic Republic speeches on Baghdad's Persian-speaking radio and television; was arrested when he returned to Iran in 1995 and was sentenced to 20 years in prison but was released after ten years in 2005);
- Abdolmajid Moradzehi (aide to Sunni cleric arrested in January 2023 for "manipulating public opinion" and "communicating on several occasions with foreign individuals and media outlets");
- Kazemeini Boroujerdi, (imprisoned in Evin Prison for "crimes against God", after he refused to accept the doctrine of absolute velayat-e faqih);
- Morteza Fahim Kermani
- Hadi Ghabel, (convicted of insulting the Supreme Leader);
- Ahmad Ghabel
- Hadi Khamenei (brother of Supreme Leader Ali Khamenei, advisor to President Mohammad Khatami, hospitalized twice from head injuries beatings by supporters of hard-line leadership, SCC temporarily banned his Hayat-e No newspaper in January 2000)
- Mohsen Kadivar (sentenced to 18 months in prison by SCC in 1999, for spreading false information about Iran's "sacred system of the Islamic Republic" and of helping enemies of the Islamic revolution;
- Hasan Yousefi Eshkevari (convicted of "denying and insulting the holy religion of Islam", 'insulting top-rank officials' and other charges by the SCC served four years in prison);

Clerics executed ("for dependence on the former regime" or activities forbidden by the Islamic republic) on orders of the Clerical Court:

- Gholam-Hussein Daneshi (accused of collaborating with SAVAK, executed on 13 March 1979),
- Mehdi Hashemi (opposed to the regime's secret dealings" in the Iran–Contra affair, he was executed in September 1987, officially for sedition, murder, and related charges)
- Abdolreza Hejazi (a preacher in Tehran who was accused of plotting for a coup shortly after the revolution; was defrocked and executed in 1983);

Sentenced to death and were executed for indecent behavior (adultery):

- Fattallah Omid Najafabadi
- Mir-Ali Naghi Seyyid Khavari Langeroudi

== See also ==
- Islamic Revolutionary Court
- Political repression in the Islamic Republic of Iran
- Mehdi Hashemi
- Iran-Contra Affair
- Mohammad Mousavi Khoeiniha
- Mohsen Kadivar
- Abdullah Nouri
- Ahmad Azari Qomi
- Hussein-Ali Montazeri

== Bibliography ==
- Mirjam Künkler (24 May 2010). The Special Courts of the Clergy and the Repression of Dissident Clergy in Iran. SSRN.
