= Abdol-Hamid Masoumi-Tehrani =

21st-century Iranian Islamic cleric

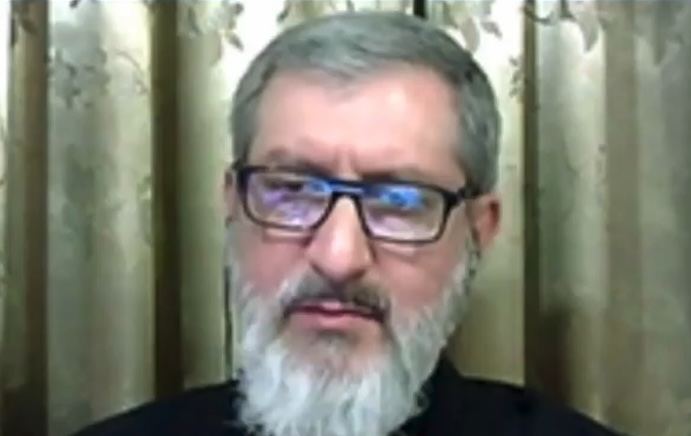
- Abdol-Hamin Tehrani giving an interview with VOA in 2020.
- Title: Ayatollah

Personal life
- Born: C. 1961
- Era: Modern era
- Website: amasomi.net

Religious life
- Religion: Islam
- Jurisprudence: Twelver Shia

Ayatollah Abdol-Hamid Masoumi-Tehrani (Persian: عبدالحمید معصومی تهرانی) is an Iranian cleric based in Tehran, Iran. Masoumi-Tehrani was born in Tehran to a distinguished cleric family and attained the rank of Ayatollah. Masoumi-Tehrani is an accomplished calligrapher and spends much of his time engaged in this profession as he believes that money should not be made through religion. He strongly advocates human rights for all regardless of religious ideology or belief and has created in calligraphy from the Torah, Psalms and Quran to foster unity amongst religions.

Masoumi-Tehrani has been pressured by authorities, detained, and imprisoned on various occasions, starting when he was 23. He claims to have been questioned even by agents of reformist president Mohammad Khatami regarding his project to publish calligraphy of the Torah, and that beginning in 2004 he received threats connected to his similar project for the Psalms.

In April 2014, as a mark of solidarity with the Baháʼí community of Iran, the largest religious minority in the country, he gifted the Baháʼís of the world a calligraphy work from the writings of Bahá'u'lláh, the prophet founder of the Baháʼí Faith, which states: "Consort with all religions with amity and concord, that they may inhale from you the sweet fragrance of God. Beware lest amidst men the flame of foolish ignorance overpower you. All things proceed from God and unto Him they return. He is the source of all things and in Him all things are ended." The Ayatollah's call for religious tolerance and co-existence has received worldwide support from religious leaders.

In November 2015, Masoumi-Tehrani gave 15 recently arrested Baháʼís in Iran another calligraphy work he produced. It featured a quotation from The Hidden Words, one of the Baháʼí Faith's sacred texts: "O Son Of Man! Ponder and reflect. Is it thy wish to die upon thy bed, or to shed thy life-blood on the dust, a martyr in My path, and so become the manifestation of My command and the revealer of My light in the highest paradise? Judge thou aright, O servant!" He said he wished to raise awareness among Iranians about the dignity of people regardless of religion.

In 2021, Tehrani gave an interview to Israeli television from Tehran, said that “Iranians and Jews have many years of friendship" and declared that he hasn't met Iranians who don’t have a positive opinion of Israel. He called for an end for "illogical hostility between the Iranian and Israeli peoples".

== Activities Timeline ==
Ayatollah Abdol-Hamid Masoumi-Tehrani lives in Tehran, Iran. He was first arrested in August 1989 by order of the Special Clerical Court for privately criticizing and opposing the selection of Ayatollah Khamenei as Supreme Leader. After spending two months in solitary confinement in Ward 240 of Evin Prison, he was sentenced to five years in prison, 40 lashes, and a ban on delivering of Islamic seminary subjects and public speaking on charges of insulting the Supreme Leader and government officials, inciting public opinion against the regime, spreading rumors, and disseminating false information.

In 1990, Mr. Masoumi-Tehrani was sentenced to another 40 lashes for violating the previous ruling, because during a three-day leave, he met with prominent clerics Ayatollah Golpayegani and Ayatollah Marashi Najafi in Qom to inform them about the details of his case. He was released in 1991 from prison and placed under house arrest until 1993.

A few months after the house arrest ended in 1993, Mr. Masoumi-Tehrani co-founded an underground organization called "Iranian Freedom-seeking Clerics" with Ayatollah Esmail AleEs’haq, Ayatollah Seyyed Reza Sadr (brother of Imam Musa Sadr), and Molavi Dr. Ahmad Sayad (a religious leader from Balochistan). At the suggestion of Seyyed Reza Sadr, the organization became known as the "Party of Freedom-seeking Clerics of Iran." Their activities involved drafting and distributing statements on current issues and encouraging clerics to oppose theocratic governance. These statements were sent to mosques and religious seminaries across the country. Seyyed Reza Sadr died in 1994, and Molavi Dr. Ahmad Sayad was assassinated.

In 1995, the Ministry of Intelligence arrested Mr. Masoumi-Tehrani and Ayatollah Ale-Es’haq for publishing statements from the "Party of Freedom-seeking Clerics of Iran," which had a notable impact among the clergy. After spending four months in solitary confinement at Towhid Detention Center (formerly the Shah's Joint Anti-Sabotage Committee), they were sentenced to one and a half years in prison and received 80 lashes (40 each) on charges of insulting the Supreme Leader, conspiracy against national security, violating prior rulings, and producing and distributing misleading statements.

In 1997, he finished the second prison sentence.

During the solitary confinement, Mr. Masoumi-Tehrani reflected deeply on their initiatives and concluded that those strategies would not lead to the desired outcomes. Inspired by collaboration with RIP Molavi Dr. Ahmad Sayad, he decided to shift focus toward interfaith activities.

In October 1997, after watching a film about the Taliban's atrocities in Afghanistan, Mr. Masoumi-Tehrani ceased all other activities and, in collaboration with Mr. Mehdi Bahman, devoted himself to designing and calligraphing the Torah

In April 2000, the partnership completed designing and calligraphing of Torah and announced the matter in a public statement

After the events of September 11, 2001, the partnership intended to send Torah in five segments to various religious and cultural centers in solidarity with the bereaved families and the American nation. However, it was deemed infeasible due to weight and size. Thus, in April 2001, Mr. Masoumi-Tehrani decided to provide a calligraphed and illuminated version of the Book of Psalms of Prophet David and present it to the US authorities

In 2002, Mr. Masoumi-Tehrani issued a statement condemning the first suicide bombing in Israel, which had a significant impact among scholars and religious figures, encouraging them to criticize the Islamic Republic's policies towards Israel more openly

In 2004, the Book of Psalms was completed and dedicated, on behalf of the Iranian people, to the victims and the surviving families of the 9/11 in a public statement

In 2005, Mr. Mehdi Bahman personally delivered the Book of Psalms, accompanied by a letter, to the U.S. Embassy in Ankara. This initiative sparked outrage among hardline clerics in Qom, including Ayatollah Mohammad Fazel Lankarani. Following numerous threats, the partnership had to change the location of their office and remove their contact information from the website. In 2006, Mr. Masoumi-Tehrani wrote an open complaint to the Minister of Intelligence, but it was ignored and The Book of Psalms is now archived in the Library of Congress under registration number 2007332311

Since submitting the Book of Psalms, Mr. Masoumi-Tehrani had primarily concentrated on researching Islamic studies and religious matters, regularly publishing essays online.

In 2008, to protest the Islamic Republic's policies towards Israel and to highlight Iran’s historical connection with the Jewish people, Mr. Masoumi-Tehrani decided to calligraph and illuminate the Book of Ezra .

During creation of the Book of Ezra in 2009, Mr. Masoumi-Tehrani was arrested by the Ministry of Intelligence due to discussions posted online. He spent two months in solitary confinement in Ward 240, then one month in Ward 209, and then was returned to Ward 240. After a month, he was released on bail. The Special Clerical Court fined him two million tomans (roughly 2000 USD) for his online activities and for defaming the clergy.

After the case was settled, he resumed the calligraphy and illumination of the Book of Ezra . Despite repeated summons and complaints from the Ministry of Intelligence, which caused delays in the process, Mr. Masoumi-Tehrani completed the Book of Ezra in 2011 and released a statement.

In 2014, to show support for the Baha'i citizens and protest against the violation of their human rights, Mr. Masoumi-Tehrani designed and created a symbolic artwork, which is now housed in the Baha'i Universal House of Justice, Haifa, Israel. This symbolic gesture in support of Baha'i human rights was praised by various religious centers, academics, and religious leaders across different countries.

Later in 2014, Mr. Masoumi-Tehrani was again summoned and interrogated by the Special Clerical Court for designing and sending the artwork in support of the Baha'is. The case remained open, and he was frequently called in for questioning. This was noted in the U.S. State Department's 2014 Human Rights Report on Iran. It was not until 2020 that a non-prosecution order was issued, officially closing the case.

Mr. Masoumi-Tehrani worked in close relationship with various Iranian human rights activists. He was invited by Dr. Mohammad Maleki, Nasrin Sotoudeh, and Narges Mohammadi to join the Campaign for the Gradual Abolition of the Death Penalty (LEGAM). Despite the encouragement, Mr. Masoumi-Tehrani agreed only to support the campaign as an ally.

In 2016, Mr. Masoumi-Tehrani created an artwork consisting of eight symbolic pieces, aiming to promote solidarity and unity among the diverse religious communities in Iran. Each piece of this artwork was dedicated to a specific religious group in Iran, including the Mandaeans in Ahvaz, Yarsanis in Kermanshah, Sunnis in Kurdistan, Zoroastrians in Yazd, and Iranian Jews in Tehran. These pieces were personally submitted during in-person meetings with the respective religious leaders. However, the Christian leaders chose not to participate in the initiative, citing government pressure. The piece intended for the Shia Muslim community remained in Mr. Masoumi-Tehrani's possession, awaiting presentation to an independent religious leader. This initiative significantly contributed to discussions on religious freedom, interfaith solidarity, and all-encompassing patriotism in Iran.

In 2017, the Book of Ezra was dedicated to Rabbi Yitzhak Yosef, the Chief Rabbi of Israel, as a gesture of friendship between the Iranian and Israeli peoples. The Book of Ezra was mailed to Jerusalem from London through an intermediary.

Since submitting the Book of Ezra , Mr. Masoumi-Tehrani’s activities have mostly involved writing articles and giving interviews on religious, political, and social issues. He has also been actively engaged in advocating for the rights of religious minorities, including Mandaeans, Yarsanis, Baha’is, and political prisoners.

In early 2021, Mr. Masoumi-Tehrani gave an interview to Israel's Channel 12, which significantly increased the connection between Iranians and Israelis.

In October 2022, during the height of the protests known as the "Mahsa Uprising," Mr. Masoumi-Tehrani was arrested by the Ministry of Intelligence and sentenced to five years of suspended imprisonment. He faced charges of propaganda against the regime and conspiracy against national security, with the sentence remaining active until 2027.

== See also ==
- List of ayatollahs
