= Ahmad Azari Qomi =

Iranian Grand Ayatollah (1925-1999)

- احمد بیگدلی آذری قمی
- Title: Grand Ayatollah

Personal life
- Born: 1925 Qom, Iran
- Died: February 1999 (aged 73–74)
- Resting place: Fatima Masumeh Shrine
- Era: Modern era
- Region: Iran
- Political party: Society of Seminary Teachers of Qom; Combatant Clergy Association

Religious life
- Religion: Shia Islam
- Sect: Twelver

Grand Ayatollah Ahmad Azari-Qomi-Bigdeli (Persian: احمد بیگدلی آذری قمی; 1925 – February 1999) was an Iranian cleric. After the 1979 Iranian Revolution he served on the Special Clerical Court and Assembly of Experts, and founded the conservative Resalat newspaper. He was arrested in November 1997 after an open letter by him was published in Britain criticizing Supreme Leader Ali Khamenei for allowing torture and "moral corruption" among officials and clerics. Shortly after Khamenei denounced him in a televised speech for allegedly committing "treason against the people, the revolution and the country." His renewed candidacy for the Assembly of Experts was rejected by the Guardian Council the next year and he died in 1999.

== Background and career ==
Azari was born to a family of Sh'ia clerics in Qom in 1925.

Azari started his studies at Qom in 1941 under Ayatollahs Seyyed Hossein Borujerdi, Mohaqqeq-Damad and Muhammad Husayn Tabatabai. Upon finishing his clerical studies, he emigrated to Tabriz in northwest Iran to work as a religious teacher in a boarding school.

Azari was a founding member of the Society of Seminary Teachers of Qom, and a Combatant Clergy Association member. Between 1965 and 1979 he was imprisoned several times. He was judge in the Special Clerical Court after the 1979 revolution. He was a member of the Assembly of Experts that originally elected Ali Khamenei as Ruhollah Khomeini's successor. He also founded the Resalat Foundation, a religious organisation which owns the Resalat newspaper. Azari-Qomi was originally a staunch conservative. Allegedly, in the midst of the struggle over the Land Reform which the leftist parliament envisioned in the early 1980s, Azari-Qomi asked for Khomeini's permission to found a conservative newspaper, but Khomeini declined. Azari-Qomi tried again a year later. This time, Khomeini did not react to the request, which Azari-Qomi interpreted as a permission. This was the birth of Resalat Newspaper, together with Keyhan one of the most conservative newspapers in Iran.

== Conflict with Khamenei ==
Azari Qomi was arrested in November 1997 after having published an open letter outside of Iran (inter alia in the London-based independent weekly newspaper Nimrooz) in which he criticized Supreme Leader Ali Khamenei. In the 34-page open letter, Azari-Qomi blamed Khamenei for having initiated the creation of the Ansar-e Hezbollah that was responsible for threatening a number of liberal academics and writers. He accused Khamenei for having set the stage for widespread "moral corruption" among regime officials and clergymen which has "withered the roots of decency." Azari Qomi also criticized the Islamic Republic for torturing the sons of Grand Ayatollah Mohammad Shirazi. "Even if he rejects the velayat-e faqih, why torture his children? Security organizations should learn from the shameful fate of the SAVAK," Azari Qomi wrote. Azari Qomi also appealed to president Khatami to abolish the Special Clerical Court which had arrested and tortured many followers of Grand Ayatollah Shirazi.

In his letter Azari Qomi proposed that the velayat-e faqih should be split into two different realms of theological authority and political authority. Ayatollah Montazeri should handle religious affairs, while Khamenei could exercise political authority.

Finally, Grand Ayatollah Azari-Qomi reminded the new president Khatami that with more than 23 million people who voted for him, he had the constitutional possibility to call for a referendum on the extent of the powers and the role of the Supreme Leader.

"With their vote in your favour, our brave people have brought the whole of the present leadership under question and I’m proud of it. But, dear Mr President, be careful of not becoming the last of the presidents of the Islamic Republic, for this is what may well be your fate if you do not act now to stop at once present injustices committed under the name of Islam".

In response, on 10 November 1997, Azeri-Qomi was forcibly expelled from clerical institutes in Qom and his and Ayatollah Montazeri's offices were ransacked.

On 26 November 1997, the Supreme Leader of the Islamic Republic, Ayatollah Ali Khamenei, announced in a televised speech that Grand Ayatollahs Montazeri and Azari-Qomi had "committed treason against the people, the revolution and the country," and commanded the Judiciary Branch to ensure they were "punished according to the law."

Iran News reported on 5 February 1998 that Jomhuri-ye Islami printed an article on a recent meeting in Mashhad between some members of the Assembly of Experts who asked for the expulsion of Azari-Qomi from the Assembly. Ultimately, Azari-Qomi was not expelled from the Assembly of Experts, but his renewed candidacy in 1998 was rejected by the Guardian Council.

Azeri-Qomi spent 15 months under house arrest, during this time becoming "comatose twice", according to Mohsen Kadivar. He was hospitalized on 1 February 1999 and died shortly thereafter at the age of 74.

== Works ==
- Sima-ye Zan dar Nezam-e Eslami (Woman's Image in Islamic Order)

== See also ==
- Special Clerical Court
- Grand Ayatollah Hossein-Ali Montazeri
- Society of Seminary Teachers of Qom
- Society of the Militant Clergy of Tehran
