= Boroujerdi =

Boroujerdi is an Iranian surname referring to the region of Borujerd. Notable people with this name include:

- Seyyed Hossein Borujerdi, (1875–1961) Grand Ayatollah
- Mostafa Boroujerdi, (1962) Ayatollah Doctor
- Hossein Kazemeyni Boroujerdi, Former Ayatollah (also referred to as Mohammad Kazemeini Boroujerdi)
- Mohammad Ali Kazemeini Boroujerdi, Ayatollah, father of Hossein Kazemeyni Boroujerdi
- Alaeddin Boroujerdi, Iranian member of parliament
- Mohammad Boroujerdi, Iranian commander in Iran–Iraq War

== See also ==
- Borujerdi
