= Moses and the Shepherd (album) =

Studio album by Shahram Nazeri

Moses & the Shepherd is an album by Iranian tenor singer Shahram Nazeri.

== Track listing ==
Rumi is credited as the "poet" for each track.

1. Daramad
2. Moses to Shepeherd
3. Shepherd to Moses
4. God's voice
5. Music and Instrument
6. Music and Instrument
7. Song
8. Masnavi Vocal
9. Song

== Personnel ==
- Vocals – Shahram Nazeri
- Other performers – Jalal Zolfonun, Behzad Forouhari, and Mohammad Hooman
- Poetry by Rumi

== See also ==
- Moses and Shepherd (story)
