= Moses and the Shepherd (story) =

Moses and the Shepherd (Persian: موسی و شبان) is a story from the 13th-century Sufi work Masnavi, by the Persian poet Rumi.

The story tells how Moses one day happens to overhear an ignorant shepherd praying to God. The shepherd promises to wash God's clothes, to bring God milk to drink, to comb God's hair and kill his lice, and other such actions as one might do for a beloved friend. Moses rebukes the shepherd for attributing human characteristics to God, and also for speaking to God in such a familiar manner. The shepherd abjectly apologizes and rends his garment in contrition.

But God Himself immediately rebukes Moses for discouraging the faithful shepherd. All prayers are valuable, says God; everyone worships in his own way; and God is not offended by familiarity nor ignorance. Moreover, says God, while the shepherd may have a wrongheaded conception of God, it's quite prideful of Moses to believe that Moses' own conception is any closer to God's actual transcendent nature. Therefore, says God, let everyone pray in their own way. Moses, chastened, finds the shepherd again and apologizes to him.

== See also ==
- Moses and the Shepherd, an album by Iranian tenor Shahram Nazeri
