= Mirjam Kuenkler =

German political scientist

- Other name: Mirjam Künkler

Academic background
- Education: Columbia University

Academic work
- Era: 20th-century comparative politics
- Discipline: Iranian political thought
- Main interests: Oriental studies

Mirjam Künkler, (Ph.D. Columbia University) teaches Middle Eastern Politics at Princeton University. Kuenkler's expertise is in Iranian and Indonesian politics.

Künkler has published widely on religion-state relations, law, party politics, social movements, and female Islamic authority in Iran and Indonesia. She is the principal-investigator of the "Iran Data Portal" funded by the Social Science Research Council (SSRC), and the co-convener of the Oxford-Princeton research cluster on "Traditional authority and transnational religious networks in contemporary Shi‘ism.” She is a fellow of the “Women Creating Change” Project on Gender, Religion, and Law in Muslim Societies at Columbia University, New York, and was one of the PIs of the Luce Grant on Religion and International Affairs at Princeton University.

Künkler has been a senior research fellow at The Royal Netherlands Institute of Southeast Asian and Caribbean Studies (KITLV); the Politics Department at the University of Oxford; the Social Science Research Center Berlin (WZB); the Centre for Strategic and International Studies, Jakarta; the Islamic State University (UIN), Alauddin Makassar (Sulawesi), Indonesia; and the Faculty of Social Science, University of Tehran.

She is a member of the Advisory Board of the Cambridge Journal of Law and Religion, a Trustee for Princeton University to the American Institute of Iranian Studies (AIIrS), a Member of the MESA Committee on Academic Freedom, deputy chair of the Scientific Advisory Council for the Centre for Global Cooperation Research, University of Duisburg, and a former Member of the Board of the Association for the Study of Persianate Societies (ASPS).

Künkler has received numerous awards and grants, among others from the Volkswagen Foundation, the Social Science Research Council (SSRC), the British Academy, the United States Institute of Peace (USIP), the Society for the Scientific Study of Religion, the Henry Luce Foundation, the Institute for Social & Economic Research and Policy (ISERP), the Tokyo and Nippon Foundations (SYLFF), the German Academic Exchange Service (DAAD), Geisteswissenschaften International, the British Institute for Persian Studies (BIPS), Columbia University, the University of Oxford, and Princeton University.

Among the dissertations and theses she has advised are: “Shi‘i Islamism and Gender in Iraq,” “The Contentious Politics Of Educational Equity In Iran,” “Asymmetry of Interest: Turkish-Iranian Relations since 1979,” “An Institutional History Of The Iranian Construction Jihad,” “Islamic Education in 20th century Turkey,” “Ayatollah Montazeri's work on 'Religious Government and Human Rights',” “The Transformation of Religious Authority of the Ulama and Islamic Law in the Volga-Ural Muslim Community under Russian Imperial Rule,” and “Institutionalizing Religion: Islamic Religious Authorities and Democracy in the Middle East.”

== See also ==
- American Institute of Iranian Studies
- Lady Amin
- Mujtahideh
- Mohammad Reyshahri
