= Hossein Kazemeyni Boroujerdi =

Iranian Twelver Shi'i Muslim cleric

- Born: 1 August 1958 (age 67); Qom, Iran

Hossein Kazemeyni Boroujerdi (Persian: حسین کاظمینی بروجردی, also Hosein Kazemaini Boroujerdi, born August 1, 1958) is a former Twelver Shi'i Muslim Ayatollah and cleric who advocates the separation of religion and government and has been arrested and jailed several times by the Iranian government for his criticisms directed against the Supreme Leader, Ali Khamenei.

After eleven years as a political and religious prisoner, Boroujerdi defrocked, abandoning his status as an Ayatollah, and became an secularism activist. The Iranian state allegedly tried to have him killed after accusing him of apostasy.

== Early life ==
He reportedly first expressed his opposition to the theocratic nature of the Islamic government of Iran under which Islamic jurists rule or provide "guardianship" in 1994. He has been quoted as saying Iranians "are loyal to the fundamentals of the true religion and the Prophet's mission", but are "tired of the religion of politics and political slogans."

Boroujerdi and many of his followers were arrested in Tehran on October 8, 2006, following a clash between police and hundreds of his followers. Iranian officials charged him with having claimed to be a representative of Muhammad al-Mahdi, a venerated figure in Shi'i Islam, a charge he denies.

According to the mardaninews website, as of 1 June 2008 "judicial authorities have released no information concerning his prosecution" and his medical condition is deteriorating. Human Rights Watch announced the urgency on 4 June 2008.

== Views ==
Boroujerdi had been preaching a traditional interpretation of Islam which separates religion from politics from a mosque in a poor neighbourhood in the south of Tehran for some years.

He has been quoted as saying that Iranians believe that they are loyal to the fundamentals of the true religion and the Prophet's mission, but they are opposed to the politicization of religion and its exploitation by a group that has nothing to do with true Islam. Islam is the religion of tolerance, forbearance, and mercy, to the point where the Qur'an emphasized to us that 'there is no compulsion in religion.

He wrote on circumstances surrounding the death of his father, Ayatollah Seyyed Mohammad Ali Kazemeini Boroujerdi in 2002, the subsequent confiscation of his father's mosque, and his own and his followers' harassment by Iran's theocratic government.

Boroujerdi says that since 1994 he says he has been summoned repeatedly before Iran's Special Clerical Court. He was imprisoned for several months in 1995 and 2001 and in 2006 he was again summoned by the Special Clerical Court.

In 2010, Boroujerdi wrote an open letter to Supreme Leader Ali Khamenei, accusing him of responsibility for the violation of human rights in Iran, and calling for "free referendum" in Iran "directly supervised by UN observers."

== Demonstration, arrests ==
He declined to appear for the summons and the Iranian government issued a warrant for his arrest. Supporters and students of the Ayatollah gathered at his home in order to protect him, many of them staying for "more than ten weeks to offer protection."

On October 7, 2006, a large crowd of over 1,000 people, including many women, gathered around his house and prevented his arrest by police forces and was able to repel them.

The Iranian news service IRNA, posted pictures of the demonstration and printed some of the slogans shouted by the crowd: "Freedom, freedom - This is our incontrovertible right," (a counterpoint to the slogan shouted by supporters of the regime during Friday prayers: "Nuclear energy - This is our incontrovertible right,") and, "[We are] ready for martyrdom according to our traditional religion - that is, Islam that is not political."

== Prosecution ==
According to the mardaninews website: "In June 2007, the Special Clerical Court prosecuted him behind closed doors. The authorities have not provided any official accounting regarding his prosecution and sentencing. According to his associates, he was initially sentenced to death, but upon appeals, his sentence was reduced to 11 years in prison, ten of which must be served in exile in the city of Yazd. He has been deprived of access to an independent attorney throughout his prosecution and imprisonment."

Amnesty International reports that there are believed to have been 30 charges against him,

These include “waging war against God” (Moharebeh), for which the punishment is death; acts against national security; publicly calling political leadership by clergy (Velayat-e Faqih) unlawful; having links with anti-revolutionaries and spies; and using the term “religious dictatorship” instead of “Islamic Republic” in public discourse and radio interviews.

== Condition in prison ==
Ayatollah Boroujerdi reportedly suffered from poor prison conditions, torture, and ill-treatment, which worsened his pre-existing medical conditions. According to Amnesty International, these conditions led to a deterioration in Ayatollah Boroujerdi's health.

According to the International Campaign for Human Rights in Iran, Ayatollah Boroujerdi was then suffering from multiple health complications. These include heart and respiratory problems, kidney stone complications, and loss of 80% of his vision due to cataracts. The report also states that Ayatollah Boroujerdi has lost up to 80 pounds (36 kg) during his imprisonment, according to his physician, Dr. Hesam Firoozi.

Dr. Firoozi wrote to the head of the Judiciary on September 2, 2008:

“As an independent physician, with no political leanings and agenda, and in keeping with my sacred duties as a physician devoted to the goal of saving the lives of humans, I urge your Excellency to order his transfer to a specialist medical facility outside the prison, to save his life,” Dr. Firoozi wrote to the head of the Judiciary on September 2, 2008.

In April 2009, Boroujerdi wrote a letter to United Nations Secretary-General Ban Ki-moon, urging Ki-Moon to intervene in his case, according to the website Washington TV. On 5 May 2009, he began a hunger strike to protest the suspension of his rights to make telephone calls to his family and lawyer and to receive visits from them. Two weeks later he was hospitalized in the medical facility of Yazd Prison. According to Roya Eraghi, a follower of Boroujerdi, as of July 2011 Boroujedri's health has further deteriorated due to severe pressure and torture in prison. Despite a heart condition and loss of vision in one eye, he has not been allowed to leave prison to receive medical treatment.

== Life after Clericalism ==
During his stay in prison, Boroujerdi has voluntarily defrocked himself and abandoned the position and duties of an Islamic Cleric, in protest of the Iranian state and its system of Velayat-e-faqih.

Recently, Borujerdi has become more skeptical towards certain Islamic beliefs and texts of Quran and Hadiths, and instead advocates against organized religion (ascribing to 'No Politics-No Religion').

Instead of promoting and advocating for the Islamic faith and Shia sect, he began a movement in 2018 called Monotheism without borders, calling for all towards Tawhid (monotheism) which goes past man-made boundaries of religion, country, ritual, and traditional laws (Sharia). It means that the viewpoint of religious promoters and missionaries throughout all these years is done with. In Boroujerdi's views the religions of Islam, Christianity, and Judaism have become different from the truths of Muhammad, Jesus, and Moses because, over time, the religions of those great prophets have been pierced by innovations, comments, records, etc.

== See also ==
- Human rights in Iran
- Special Clerical Court
