= Mohsen Kadivar =

Iranian philosopher (born 1959)

- محسن کدیور
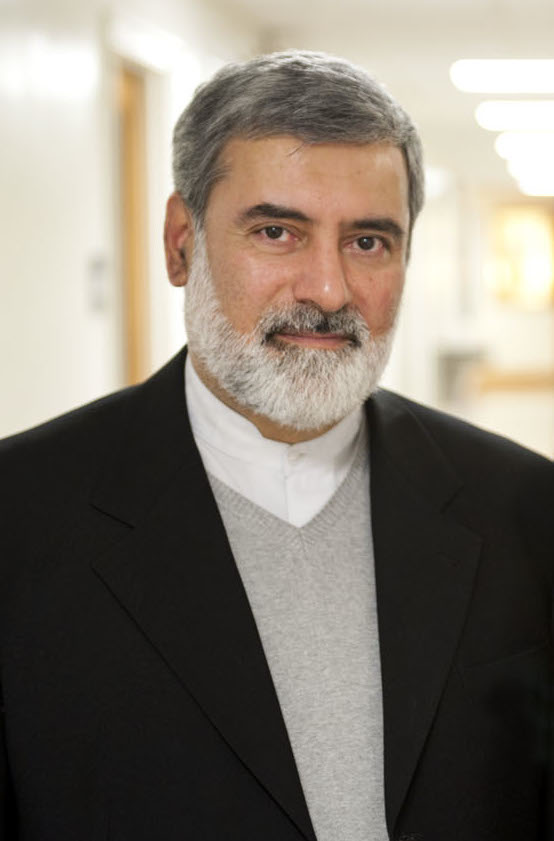
- Mohsen Kadivar at Duke University, January 2012

Personal life
- Born: 1959 (age 66–67) Fasa, Iran
- Spouse: Zahra Roodi
- Children: 4
- Era: Kalam – 21st-century philosophy
- Region: Islamic philosophy
- Main interest(s): Classical and modern Islamic philosophy, theology, and legal theory
- Notable work(s): The Theories of State in the Shi'ite Jurisprudence, Government by Mandate, Government by Appointment, Reform in Shari'a, Islam as an End in Itself, Revisiting Women's Rights in Islam, Apostasy and Blasphemy
- Education: Pahlavi University (dropped out); Qom Seminary; University of Qom; Tarbiat Modares University
- Known for: Criticism of Velayat-e faqih; reformist interpretations of Shi'a jurisprudence and theology; scholarship on human rights, democracy, and religious freedom
- Relatives: Jamileh Kadivar (sister); Ata'ollah Mohajerani (brother-in-law)
- Institutions: Mofid University; Center for Strategic Research; Tarbiat Modares University; Institute for Research in Philosophy; Duke University
- Website: english.kadivar.com

Religious life
- Religion: Islam
- Denomination: Shia Islam
- School: Usuli
- Sect: Twelver Shi'ism
- Jurisprudence: Ja'fari
- Profession: Mujtahid, Islamic theologian, philosopher, writer, and research professor of Islamic Studies at Duke University

Muslim leader
- Influenced by: Ali Shariati, Mahmoud Taleghani, Mehdi Bazargan, Morteza Motahhari, Allameh Tabataba'i, Muhammad Baqir al-Sadr, Hossein-Ali Montazeri
- Influenced: Contemporary Iranian religious reformist thought

Mohsen Kadivar (Persian: محسن کدیور; born 1959) is an Iranian mujtahid, Islamic theologian, philosopher, writer, leading intellectual reformist, and research professor of Islamic Studies at Duke University. A political Iranian dissident, Kadivar has been a vocal critic of the doctrine of clerical rule, also known as Velayat-e Faqih (Guardianship of the Islamic Jurist), and a strong advocate of democratic and liberal reforms in Iran as well as constructional reform in understanding of shari'a and Shi'a theology. Kadivar has served time in prison in Iran for his political activism and beliefs.

== Education and career ==
Born in Fasa (Fars province) to a politically active family, Mohsen Kadivar completed his primary and secondary education in Shiraz before being admitted into electronics engineering at Shiraz University in 1977. He became politically active as a student and was arrested by the Shah's police in May 1978 for his political activities. In 1980 he switched his focus to religious education and began attending Shiraz Seminary. He moved to Qom in 1981 to pursue his studies in fiqh and philosophy. In Qom, he was taught by prominent teachers like Ayatollah Hossein-Ali Montazeri. Kadivar graduated with a degree in ijtihad in 1997. He got his Ph.D. in Islamic philosophy and theology from Tarbiat Modares University in Tehran in 1999.

Kadivar started his career as a teacher teaching fiqh and Islamic philosophy at Qom Seminary for fourteen years. He began teaching Islamic philosophy and theology at Imam Sadegh University, Mofid University, Shahid Beheshti University, and Tarbiat Modarres University for seven years. He started as an assistant professor of philosophy at Tarbiat Modarres University in 2000. In 2007 political pressures forced Kadivar to leave his teaching appointment for a position at the Research Center of the Iranian Institute of Philosophy. As an associate professor of Islamic Philosophy Kadivar was fired from his academic job in 2011 because of his political critiques. He was visiting scholar at the Islamic Legal Studies Program of Harvard Law School in 2002, visiting professor of Islamic studies at the University of Virginia (2008–2009), and at Duke University (fall 2009 – spring 2014). He held the fall 2014 Keohane Distinguished Visiting Professorship of University of North Carolina at Chapel Hill. Kadivar is currently a research professor of Islamic Studies in the department of religious studies at Duke University.

== Personal life ==
Kadivar married Zahra Roodi in 1981 and has four children. Jamileh Kadivar is his sister.

== Dissent ==
Kadivar is a prominent critic of the Islamic Republic system in Iran, and wrote a detailed criticism of Ayatollah Khomeini's theory of Islamic government as rule by Shia clerics, Government by Mandate (see below). As punishment for his criticism, Kadivar was sentenced to eighteen months in prison after being convicted by the Special Clerical Court in 1999, on charges of having spread false information about Iran's "sacred system of the Islamic Republic" and of helping enemies of the Islamic revolution, or as another observer put it, "for commenting on the contradiction between the revolution's aims to serve the people and the subsequent concentration of power in the hands of clerics." He was released from Evin Prison, on July 17, 2000. Kadivar was unrepentant on his release and is currently active in the various reform movements of Iran. His publications including books, articles, and interviews were banned in Iran since 2009, and he was fired from his job in 2011. Kadivar has been in exile since 2007.

In a 2004 interview, Kadivar told a journalist,

"Every member of society and every member of government is subject to the law. No one can be above it. Everyone has the same rights, yet the root of the faqih is inequality. He assumes he is above it. ... It is time for the supreme leader to be subject to the constitution too. After all, the Supreme Leader doesn't come from God!"

On the issue of clerics in government, he has said:

"Our job as religious people is not politics. ... They are taking Iran backward, not toward the future."

== Books ==
Kadivar is a prolific author and has published thirteen books by 2009, and eleven books since 2009, when his publication was banned in Iran. He has also been writing extensively in various Iranian journals and has over 200 articles to his name. One of his books is Human Rights and Reformist Islam (In Translation: Contemporary Thought in Muslim Contexts), 2021. ISBN 978-1-474-44930-4

=== Human rights and Islam ===
1. Haqq al-Nass (The Right of People in Islam: Islam and Human Rights), Tehran, 2008, 439 pages.
2. Mujazat-e Ertedad wa Azadi-ye Mazhab: Naqd-e Mujazat-e Ertedad wa Sabb al-Nabi ba Mawazin-e Feqh-e Estedlali (Apostasy, Blasphemy, & Religious Freedom in Islam: A Critique Based on Demonstrative Jurisprudence), 2014, 406 Pages ISBN 978-1-474-45757-6
3. Gottes Recht und Menschenrechte: Eine Kritik am historischen Islam, 2017 ISBN 978-3-451-37778-5

=== Islamic Political Thought ===
1. Estizah-e Rahbari (Impeaching Iran's Supreme Leader on his Political Authority; Assessing the Supreme leader's 21 years in the Office: An Open Letter to the Head of the Assembly of Experts, and the Responses to the Letter), 2014, 418 pages.
2. Ebtezal-e Marja’iyyat-e Shi’a: Estidhah-e Marja’iyyat-e Khamene’i Maqam-e Rahbari (The Trivialization of Shi’i Authority: Impeaching Iran's Supreme Leader's Claim to Religious Authority), 2015, 314 pages.
3. MOHSEN KADIVAR God and his guardians Islam's 'Luther' talks of the democratic roots of Islam, Great Britain: HANS ZELL PUBLISHERS, 2004. ISSN 0306-4220
4. Asnadi az Shekaste Shodan-e Namous-e Enqelab: Negahi be Salhaye Payani-e Zendegani-e Ayatollah Seyyed Kazim Shari’atmadari (Evidence of Dishonoring the Revolution: Examining the last years of Ayatollah S. Kazim Shari’atmadari's life, 1905–1986), (The Dissident Ayatollahs Confronting the Islamic Republic of Iran Series -1), 2015, 447 pages.
5. Matsunaga, Yasuyuki (2007). "Mohsen Kadivar, an Advocate of Postrevivalist Islam in Iran". British Journal of Middle Eastern Studies. 34 (3): 317–329. doi:10.1080/13530190701388333. JSTOR 20455533. S2CID 143752945.
6. Resolving the conflict between traditional Islam and human rights: A comparative study of Mahmoud Mohammed Taha’s and Mohsen Kadivar’s views, Critical Research on Religion; December 2021, Vol. 9 Issue: 3 p284-299, 16p. doi:10.1177/20503032211015293
7. Shimron, Yonat (2017). "Mohsen Kadivar". The Christian Century. 134 (6): 1–17. ISSN 0009-5281.
8. Faraz wa forud-e Azari Qomi: Seyri dar tahawwol-e mabaniy-e afkar-e Ayatollah Ahmad Azari Qomi (The Rise and Fall of Azari Qomi: The Evolution of Ayatollah Ahmad Azari Qomi's Thought, 1923–1999), (The Dissident Ayatollahs Confronting the Islamic Republic of Iran Series -2), 2014, 488 pages.
9. Enqelab va nezal dar butoye Naqd: Ayatollah Rahani, Mobaheteh va Marja’iyyat (Testing the Revolution and Regime with Ethical Criticism: Ayatollah S. Muhammad Rouhan [1920-97], Slander and Authority), (The Dissident Ayatollahs Confronting the Islamic Republic of Iran Series -3), 2014, 226 pages.
10. Nedaye Sabz: Rawayati as Jonbesh-e Sabz-e Mardom-e Iran (The Green Call: A Narrative of the Iranian Green Movement), Volume I, 2014, 478 pages.
11. Sug-Name-ye Faqih-e Pakbaz Ustad Ayatollah Montazeri (A Memorial to Virtuous Theologian Ayatollah Montazeri), 2013, 406 pages.
12. Dar Mahzar-e Faqih-e Azadeh Ustad Ayatollah Montazeri (In the Presence of a Noble Theologian Ayatollah Montazeri (1922–2009) A Collection of Exchanges between the Mentor and the Disciple), 2014, 382 pages.
13. Daghdagheh-haye Hokumat-e Dini (Torments of Religious Rule, a collection of political papers and lectures,) Tehran, 2000, 883 pages.
14. Shari’at va Siyasat: Din dar 'Arse-ye 'Umumi (Shari’a and Politics: Religion in Public Sphere, A Case Study of Contemporary Iran), 2008, 456 pages.
15. Baha-ye Azadi: Defa’iyat-e Kadivar dar Dadgah-e Vizheh-ye Ruhaniat (The Price of Freedom: Kadivar's Defense in the Special Clerical Court), ed. Zahra Roodi (Kadivar), Tehran, 1999, 248 pages.
16. Nazariyeh-haye Dowlat dar Fiqh-e Shi’a (The Theories of State in Shi’ite Law), (Political Thought in Shi’ite Islam Series -1), Tehran, 1998, 223 pages.
17. Hokumat-e Wila’i [The Government of the Guardian Jurist], (Political Thought in Shi’ite Islam Series -2), Tehran, 1999, 2nd edition: 2002, 443 pages..
18. Hokumate Entesabi (Appointive /Non-Elective State), 2014, 316 pages.
19. Siasat-nameh-ye Khorasani (Political Works of Akhond-e Khorasani, the spiritual leader of the Iranian Constitutional Revolution of 1906), Tehran, 2006, 382 pages.

=== Islamic Philosophy and Theology ===
1. Daftar-e Aql: Madjmou’eh Maqalat-e Falsafi va Kalami (The Book of Intellect, a collection of the philosophical and theological articles), (Political Thought in Shi’ite Islam Series -3), Tehran, 1998, 483 pages.
2. Majmu’ah-ye Mosannafat-e Hakim-e Mo’asses Aqa Ali Modarres Tehrani (Collected Works of the Pioneer Philosopher Aqa Ali Modarres Tehrani), 3 volumes, 1999: Vol. 1: Ta’liqat al-Asfar (Commentary on Asfar of Mulla Sadra), 782 pages; Vol. 2: Rasa’il va Ta’liqat (Arabic Treatises and Persian Commentaries), 578 pages; Vol. 3: Rasa’il-e Farsi (Persian Treatises and other works), 577 pages.
3. Ma’khadh-shenasi-ye Ulum-e Aqli (A Bibliography of Rational Sciences in Iran since the beginning of modern publication in the 19th century until 1996, including 32,578 books), 3 volumes, co-authored with Mohammad Noori, Tehran, 2000: Vol. 1: 1196 pages; Vol. 2: 1276 pages; Vol. 3: Indexes, 946 pages.
4. Matsunaga, Yasuyuki (2011). "Human Rights and New Jurisprudence in Mohsen Kadivar's Advocacy of 'New-Thinker' Islam". Welt des Islams. 51 (3): 358–381. doi:10.1163/157006011X603541. JSTOR 41479868.
5. Mohsen Kadivar, un clerc militant et réformisteISBN 978-2-84586-888-5

== Research works and contributions ==
Four of Kadivar's books focus on political theology. Of these, three comprise a trilogy – The Theories of State in the Shiite Jurisprudence, Government by Mandate, Government by Appointment. Two of his books focus on Islam and human rights. Four of his books and a couple of his articles were translated into Arabic.

=== The Theories of State in the Shiite Jurisprudence ===
The first volume of this trilogy, The Theories of State in the Shiite Jurisprudence (Nazarrieh haye Doulat dar Fight'h e Shi'eh), which has been translated to Arabic, encompasses a broad typology of religious opinions on the desired or permissible types of government in Shiite theology. Every single instance in this typology is either proposed or endorsed by the highest authorities in Shiite jurisprudence.

According to Kadivar, "Velayat e Motlaghe ye Faghih" reflects a spectrum of authoritative options for Islamic society. There are not one, but "no less than nine distinct possible forms of government all proposed and supported by most revered religious scholars and texts."

A. Theories of State based on Immediate Divine Legitimacy Four theocratic types, in chronological order:

1. "Appointed Mandate of Jurisconsult" in Religious Matters (Shari'at) along with the Monarchic Mandate of Muslim Potentates in Secular Matters (Saltanat E Mashrou'eh) Advocates: Mohammad Bagher Majlesi, Mirza ye Ghomi, Seyed e Kashfi, Sheikh Fadlullah Nouri, Ayatollah Abdolkarim Haeri Yazdi.

2. "General Appointed Mandate of Jurisconsults" (Velayat E Entesabi Ye 'Ummeh) Advocates: Molla Ahmad Naraghi, Sheikh Mohammad Hassan Najafi (Sahib Javahir) Ayatollahs Borujerdi, Golpayegani, Khomeini (before the revolution)

3. "General Appointed Mandate of the Council of the 'Sources of Imitation' " (Velayat E Entesabi Ye Ammeh Ye Shora Ye Marje'eh Taghlid) Advocates: Ayatollah Sayyed Mohammad Shirazi

4. "Absolute Appointed Mandate of Jurisconsult" (Velayat e Entesabi ye Motlaghe ye Faghihan) Advocate: Ayatollah Khomeini (after revolution)

B. Theories of State Based on Divine-popular Legitimacy Five democratic types, in chronological order:

5. "Constitutional State" (with the permission and supervision of Jurisprudents) (Dowlat e Mashrouteh) Advocates: Ayatollahs: Sheikh Esma'il Mahallati, Mohammad Hosein Na'ini

6. "Popular Stewardship along with Clerical Oversight" (Khelafat e Mardom ba Nezarat e Marjaiat) Advocate: Ayatollah Mohammad Bagher Sadr (secondary opinion)

7. "Elective Limited Mandate of Jurisprudents" (Velayat e Entekhabi ye Moghayyadeh ye Faghih) Advocates: Ayatollahs Murtada Motahhari, Nimatullah Salehi Najaf-Abadi, Hosein-Ali Montazeri

8. "Islamic elective State" (Dowlat e Entekhabi ye Eslami) Advocates: Ayatollahs Mohammad Bagher Sadr (primary opinion), Mohammad Mahdi Shamseddin, Muhammad Jawad Mughniya (Sayyed Kazim Shari'atmadari)

9. "Collective Government by Proxy" (Vekalat e Malekan e Shakhsi ye Mosha)" Advocate: Ayatollah Mehdi Ha'eri Yazdi

=== Government by Mandate ===
Having laid out a spectrum of authoritative options for Islamic society, in his second volume, Government by Mandate (Hokumat e Vela'i), Kadivar criticises Ayatollah Khomeini's theology, the most absolutist thesis among the varieties of "Velayat e Motlaghe ye Faghih" and the one enshrined in the constitution of the Islamic Republic of Iran. Kadivar considers this 432-page opus the heart of his trilogy and the most scholarly book he has written.

The work unfolds in two phases: the first, lays bare the presuppositions of the concept of Velayat, which concerns the meaning of the term, its interpretation in mysticism (Irfan), philosophy (Kalam), jurisprudence (Fight'h), The Qur'an, and Tradition (Sonnat). In every instance, Kadivar discounts political implications of the term. He traces the first indication of the thesis to the writings of eighteenth and nineteenth century jurists namely, Mohaghegh e Karaki, Shahid Thani, and Ahmad Naraghi. Kadivar, thus determines the age of the concept as less than two centuries, a mere blinking of an eye compared to the history of Shiite jurisprudence.

But he reserves his most devastating attacks for the second part of the book that is devoted to the critical analysis of the proofs and confirmations of the principle of government by divine mandate. Here Kadivar proceeds in four sections; following the sources of adjudication in Shiite theology he sets up and knocks down the arguments for the Velayat e Faghih adduced from Quran, Tradition, (Sonnat) consensus of the Ulama, (Ijma') and reason (Aghl), He thus concludes:

"The principle of Velayat e Faqih is neither intuitively obvious, nor rationally necessary. It is neither a requirement of religion (Din) nor a necessity for denomination (Mazhab). It is neither a part of Shiite general principles ('Usoul), nor a component of detailed observances (Forou') It is, by near consensus of Shiite Ulama, nothing more than a jurisprudential minor hypothesis."

=== Government by Appointment ===
The third volume of Kadivar's trilogy is entitled: Government by Appointment (Hokoumat e Entesabi). It deals with practical consequences, disappointments, and disenchantments that the Government based on divine mandate has brought about.

=== Reform in Shari'a ===
Kadivar's theory of foundational reform in shari'a could be abstract in this way: The three preconditions of being rational, just, and better than the solutions offered by other religions, did not only pertain in the age of revelation. In any age, the non-worship-related Shari’a precepts must meet these three preconditions on the basis of the conventions of the wise people of the day. Definite disagreement between a precept and the dictates of reason in our day, or a conflict with the norms of justice of our day, or the existence of preferable solutions in the modern age, reveal that the relevant precept was not permanent and has been abrogated. In other words, these precepts were in keeping with best interests in the age of revelation; they did not rank among the Lawgiver's permanent, unchanging laws. When people start speaking about the implications of time and place, it means that they have accepted the idea that a Shari’a precept can be temporary. The implications of time and place are not necessarily unchanging; they differ and change. The philosophy behind the presence of these precepts in unchanging Scripture and Tradition was the need to solve the problems of the age of revelation and similar situations. If the Lawgiver had not taken into account the implications of time and place of the Prophet's day and the customs of the time, and had abandoned people to their own devices—at a time when there was great need for such precepts, in view of the limitations of collective rationality in the age of revelation—it would have been out of keeping with the God's eloquent wisdom. Despite his perfections, the Prophet would have been unable—without the direct assistance of God—to solve the countless problems related to organizing religion and running society. Many was the occasion when he hoped and waited for the blessing of revelation from God. Hence, there was no alternative but to formulate—alongside the unchanging and permanent Shari’a precepts—temporary precepts that were contingent on the continuation of the underlying best interests, and to include them in Scripture and Tradition. The language of the proof, even if it explicitly conveys everlastingness, does not prevent abrogation if the evidence and proof for one precept is superseded by a subsequent proof. Our distinguished predecessors have unanimously accepted this. Formulating opinions (ijtihād) means distinguishing precepts that were laid down in accordance with the demands of time and place and the conditions of the age of revelation, from the unchanging and permanent precepts of the Shari’a. Confusing these two types of precepts, and considering all the precepts of Scripture and Tradition to be unchanging and applicable in all times and places, is to fail to understand correctly the meaning of religion, the aim of the Prophetic mission and the objectives of the Shari’a.

=== Islam as an End in Itself ===
The comparative studies between Kadivar's approach to reforming Islamic thought and other Shi'a thinkers reach these concluding remarks: There are three approaches to the discussion of the compatibility of Islam (or more precisely Shari’a and fiqh) with modernity among Muslim Shi’i thinkers in the recent century and a half in Iran. Although the Constant and Variable Perspective in its different expositions by Na’ini, Allama Tabataba’i, and Seyyed Muhammad Baqir Sadr, is the most famous perspective of the compatibility of Islam and modernity, it has four serious problems. Ayatollah Khomeini's Perspective of Governmental or Expedient Fiqh, which is the official policy of Islamic Republic of Iran, aside from its flexibility, encounters four problems. The Perspective of Islam as an End in Itself is the third approach that Kadivar argues has four advantages. It has the capacity of giving a new interpretation of Islamic jurisprudence (fiqh) in the modern world based on the spirit of Islam and the goals of the Qur’an, the tradition of the Prophet (Sunna), and his household (Ahl al-Bayt). He finds that Islam as an end in itself is a perfect perspective for the modern world.

=== Revisiting Women's Rights in Islam ===
Kadivar mentioned his innovative ideas on women's rights in 2013: There are two types of verses and hadiths regarding women's rights in the Qurʾan and Sunna. The first type designates full human rights for women, and recognises equal rights for men and women as humans, despite bodily differences between them. The second type considers that women, because of their lesser capacities, are entitled to fewer rights than men in managing the home and in society. At the same time, reason and Shariʿa required that women be treated with justice and according to what is commonly accepted as good, as right (maʿrūf). Muslim scholars, following Aristotle, construed justice as deserts based on the basis of proportional equality and considered women as entitled to fewer rights because of what they considered to be women's inherent lesser capacity. They took the first type of verses and hadith as the basis for equal rights, and the second type as the standard for women's rights and duties, and defended patriarchy as consistent with justice and Shariʿa. Both proportional equality and deserts-based justice are indefensible and unjustified. Contemporary rationality recognises humans, as they are humans, as rights-holders, and thus upholds fundamental equality and egalitarian justice. This notion of justice is very close to human dignity and Qurʾanic anthropology. The first type of verses and hadiths, on grounds of contextual rational argument, imply fixed and permanent rulings, and, by analogy, verses that apparently imply legal inequality and greater legal rights for men are considered temporary rulings whose validity has expired. According to egalitarian justice and fundamental equality, although women differ from men physically and psychologically, they are entitled to equal rights because they are human, and it is humanity – not gender, colour, race, class, religion, or political ideology – that carries rights, duties, dignity, and trust and divine vice-regency. This position is more consistent with the Qurʾanic spirit and Islamic standards; evidence for legal inequality, because of its temporariness, cannot be counted as an obstacle to the realization of legal equality.

=== Apostasy and Blasphemy ===
Rafiq Taqi, a journalist residing in Baku, Azerbaijan was fatally stabbed based on fatwa of an Ayatollah the student of Ayatollah Khomeini in 2011, accused of apostasy and blasphemy because of his articles. Kadivar denounced the ruling of execution openly and wrote a book on this issue. Here is the abstract of his opinions in the case of apostasy and blasphemy in Islam: There is no reliable proof from the Qur’an, Sunnah, consensus (ijmaʻ), or reason that can establish the validity of shedding the blood of anyone who has been accused of apostasy or defaming the Prophet. On the contrary, this goes against the Qur’an and reason. Moreover, the negative effects that would ensue from making licit the shedding of someone's blood would be plenty and, as such, would certainly weaken Islam. Only a sound judicial system can issue a judgment and supervise its implementation. The issuance of a judgment by a jurist who is qualified to issue a legal opinion (fatwa), out of the judicial system, does not suffice. A judgment on the apostate and defamer of the Prophet is absolutely lacking in evidence from the Qur’an. Traditional jurists, by employing ijtihad, have arrived at this judgment and have claimed consensus by relying on solitary (akhbar wahid) or dependable (muwatthaqah) hadiths. The ruling on killing the apostate and defamer of the Prophet is incorrect and not possible to implement on account of the following seven proofs: (a) The necessity of stopping the implementation of the rule of execution of an apostate or a blasphemer as a secondary injunction, "debilitating Islam" (avoiding the harm or seeking public welfare or governmental injunction). (b) The necessity of suspending or stopping the implementation of punishment for hudud that would lead to the killing of a person during the Occultation of the Twelfth Imam. (c) Since the judgment on killing is based on solitary reports (al-akhbar al-ahad), it is mandatory to exercise caution by negation the rule of shedding someone's blood. (d) Any judgment of killing based on solitary reports is not a valid basis for dealing with vital and critical issues. (e) Alteration of the subject matter or situational context (mawduʻ) of apostasy. (f) The hadiths mandating the execution of the apostate and defamer of the Prophet are contrary to Qur’anic dictates. (g) The rational proof is too weak to establish the execution of one who abandons religion or insults the holy personages. In conclusion, exiting from religion (i.e., apostasy) has no temporal punishment. Executing anyone on the basis of insulting the Prophet or the Qur’an or other sacred objects in Islam is therefore indefensible.

== Articles ==
Selected articles and book chapters in English:

1. Badaye' al-Hikam of Sage Agha Ali Modarres Tehrani, in S. H. Nasr & M. Aminrazavi (eds.), An Anthology of Philosophy in Persia, Vol. 5, London, I B Tauris, Jan. 2015.
2. Routinizing the Iranian Revolution, in Jeffrey T. Kenney & Ebrahim Moosa (eds.), Islam in the Modern World, New York, Rutledge, 2014, pp. 351–368.
3. Revisiting Women's Rights in Islam: 'Egalitarian Justice' in lieu of 'Meritocratic Justice', in Ziba Mir-Hosseini, Lena Larsen, Christian Moe, and Kari Vogt (eds.) Justice Through Equality: New Approaches to Muslim Family Law, London, I B Tauris, 2013, pp. 213-234.
4. Wilayat al-faqih and Democracy, in Asma Afsaruddin (ed.), Islam, the State and Political Authority, Medieval Issues and Modern Concerns; New York, Palgrave Macmillan, 2011, pp. 207–224.
5. "From Traditional Islam to Islam as an end in itself", Die Welt des Islams International Journal for the Study of Modern Islam, No.51, 2011, pp. 459–484.
6. "Human Rights and Intellectual Islam", in Kari Vogt, Lena Larsen & Christian Moe (eds.), New Directions in Islamic Thought: Exploring Reform and Muslim Tradition, London, IB Tauris, 2009, pp. 47–74.
7. "Theories of Government in Shi’i Fiqh", in Paul Luft & Colin Turner (eds.), Shi’ism, Critical concepts in Islamic Studies, Vol. 3: Law, Rite & Rituals, New York, Rutledge, 2008, pp. 267–82.
- Mohsen, Kadivar (2020). "Democracy and ethical values from Islamic perspective". Philosophy & Social Criticism. 45 (5): 563–575. doi:10.1177/0191453720909583. ISSN 0191-4537. S2CID 216457113.
1. "Freedom of Religion and Belief in Islam", in Mehran Kamrava (ed.), The New Voices of Islam: Reforming Politics and Modernity – A Reader, London, I. B. Tauris, 2006, pp. 119–142.
2. "Political Innovative Ideas and Influences of Molla Muhammad Kazim Khorasani", Annals of Japan Association for Middle East Studies (AJAMES), No. 21-1, (Special Issue Changing Knowledge and Authority in Islam), Tokyo, September 2005, pp. 59–73.
3. "An Introduction to the Public and Private Debate in Islam", Social Research, Vol.70, No.3, New School University, New York, Fall 2003, pp. 659–680.

== Reviews ==
Selected reviews in English:

1. Yasuyuki Matsunaga; "Human Rights and New Jurisprudence in Mohsen Kadivar’s Advocacy of 'New-Thinker' Islam", Die Welt des Islams, Vol. 51, Nos. 3-4 (2011), pp. 358–381
2. Banafsheh Madaninejad; New Theology in the Islamic Republic of Iran: A Comparative Study between Abdolkarim Soroush and Mohsen Kadivar, Ph.D. Thesis in The University of Texas at Austin, 2011
3. Mottahedeh, Roy; "WIlAYAT AL-FAQIH", in Esposito, John L. (editor in chief); Oxford Encyclopedia of the Islamic World, (Oxford University Press, New York, 2009); Vol. 3, pp. 288–290.
4. Sadri, Ahmad; "KADIVAR, MOHSEN", in Esposito, John L. (editor in chief); Oxford Encyclopedia of the Islamic World, (Oxford University Press, New York, 2009); Vol. 3, pp. 288–290.
5. Yasuyuki Matsunaga; Mohsen Kadivar, An Advocate of Post-revivalist Islam in Iran; British Journal of Middle Eastern Studies, Rutledge, December 2007, No.34(3), pp. 317–329.
6. Mervin, Sabrina; in Les mondes chiites etl’Iran, Mervin, Sabrina (ed.), p. 417-430: Mohsen Kadivar, un clerc militant et réformiste.
7. Geneive Abdoh and Jonatan Lyons; Answering only to God, Faith and Freedom in Twenty Century in Iran (A John Macrae Book, New York 2003); chap 5: Reinventing the Islamic Republic, pp. 123–150.
8. Farzin Vahdat; Post-revolutionary Discourses of Mohammad Mojtahed Shabestari and Mohsen Kadivar: Reconciling the Terms of Mediated Subjectivity: Part II: Reconciling the Terms of Mediated Subjectivity, Mohsen Kadivar; Critique (Critical Middle Eastern Studies); No.17, Fall 2000; pp. 135–157; Hampshire, United Kingdom.
9. Ervand Abrahamian; Book Review (Political Thought in Islam, Vol.1, by Mohsen Kadivar); Islamic Law and Society, Vol.8, No.2 (2001), Brill, pp. 295–298.

== See also ==
- Mahmoud Taleghani
- Mohammad Mojtahed Shabestari
- Abdolkarim Soroush
- Intellectual Movements in Iran
- Religious Intellectualism in Iran
