= American Institute of Iranian Studies =

Non-profit consortium of US universities and museums (Estd. 1967)

The American Institute of Iranian Studies (AIIrS) is a non-profit consortium of US universities and museums, founded in 1967, for the purpose of promoting Iranian and Persian studies. AIIrS facilitates academic and cultural exchange between the US and Iran and is dedicated to supporting scholars and funding research in Iranian studies. It represents American institutions of higher education and research in Iranian studies and furthers the field in the US curriculum.

The institute is a member of the Council of American Overseas Research Centers.

== History ==
From 1967 to 1979, AIIrS operated an overseas center in Tehran for the purpose of supporting and hosting visiting American scholars. The center was obliged to suspend its activities after the rupture of diplomatic relations between the US and Iran, and for the next two decades, AIIrS devoted itself to furthering Iranian studies in the US by offering grants to students, holding conferences and fostering a sense of community in the field. Following the Dialogue of Civilizations initiative in 1998, AIIrS resumed sending scholars to Iran and instituted grants for Iranian scholars to research in the US.

== Programs ==
The core program of AIIrS is short-term grant-making for individual scholars. Beyond the fellowship programs, AIIrS also supports conferences on Iranian studies in the US and abroad, and provides occasional funding for projects including publications and exhibitions. It also awards the Roth Prize, funded by the Lois Roth Endowment, in recognition of demonstrated excellence in translating Persian literature into English.

== Officers ==
- Beatrice Forbes Manz, president
- Matthew Stolper, vice president
- Mirjam Kuenkler, secretary
- Mohammad Mehdi Khorrami, treasurer
